= Person of Interest (The Morning Show) =

- The Morning Show episode
- Episode no.: Season 4 Episode 7
- Directed by: Miguel Arteta
- Written by: Bill Kennedy
- Cinematography by: John Grillo
- Editing by: Andrew Gust
- Original release date: October 29, 2025
- Running time: 53 minutes

Guest appearances
- Néstor Carbonell as Yanko Flores; Boyd Holbrook as Brodie; William Jackson Harper as Ben; John Hoogenakker as Andy Montgomery; Ashley Reyes as Ariana; Alain Ali Washnevsky as Arsham Nazeri; Ava Lalezarzadeh as Roya Nazeri; Hannah Leder as Isabella; Rachel Marsh as Remy; Violett Beane as Sunny Stuber; Wesam Keesh as Jamal; Amber Friendly as Layla Bell; Rushi Kota as Kabir; Victoria Tate as Rena Robinson; Shari Belafonte as Julia; Aflamu Johnson as Aflamu

Episode chronology
← Previous "If Then"	Next → "The Parent Trap"

"Person of Interest" is the seventh episode of the fourth season of the American drama television series The Morning Show, inspired by Brian Stelter's 2013 book Top of the Morning. It is the 37th overall episode of the series and was written by co-executive producer Bill Kennedy, and directed by Miguel Arteta. It was released on Apple TV+ on October 29, 2025.

The show examines the characters and culture behind a network broadcast morning news program. In the episode, Claire returns with Yanko for help in avoiding the authorities, while Bradley is pressured by the FBI to give them Claire's location. Meanwhile, Alex needs Brodie's help in deviating a possible exposé on the network.

The episode received generally positive reviews from critics, who praised the performances and ending.

== Plot ==
Bradley is asked by her FBI handler to locate Claire, who is now wanted by the FBI due to her connection with Extinction Revolt. During this, Yanko is surprised when Claire shows up at his apartment, asking to stay for a few days while avoiding authorities. Yanko begins to question his future with Ariana, as he still harbors feelings for Claire.

Following Stella's resignation, Alex is approached by a reporter intending to write an exposé about UBN's workplace culture. Brodie helps Alex by opening up about his turbulent childhood, redirecting the focus of the article. Soon afterwards, Alex has sex with Brodie, but sends him away, seemingly regretting the encounter. Alex convinces Christine to interview Roya on TMS in order to bolster Roya's asylum case.

Bradley visits Yanko, and discovers Claire is staying with him. Bradley agrees to lie to the FBI about her whereabouts, while Claire plans on running away. Claire and Yanko reminisce over their relationship and possible new paths. Despite his feelings for her, Yanko is still committed to his future with Ariana. Later, he surprises Ariana by finally proposing, which she accepts.

At TMS, Bradley is shocked to find Claire, intending to do a live interview to prove her innocence. Bradley is unable to dissuade her, concerned that she will be implicated for aiding a fugitive. Before the interview can take place, FBI agents arrive and arrest Claire, having been tipped off by Bradley. Yanko scolds Bradley and tells her he never wants to work with her again.

== Development ==
=== Production ===
The episode was written by co-executive producer Bill Kennedy, and directed by Miguel Arteta. This was Kennedy's second writing credit, and Arteta's second directing credit.

=== Writing ===
On Bradley's decision to call the FBI to arrest Claire, Reese Witherspoon said, "I think everybody's gonna be a little bit mad at her. She makes a lot of people mad this year, also what she does to Claire. Bad. I don't know if that one's recoverable. This character is hard to play this season because she didn't make a lot of choices that I felt good about."

Showrunner Charlotte Stoudt also explained the relationship between Alex and Brodie, "I think the attraction comes from ‘game recognizes game.'” They're both on -air personalities. They're both very, very strong. And they both like to pick out what's really going on. They like to get underneath. I think Bro's thing is he likes to call out hypocrites. And Alex enters any room and goes, ‘What's really going on in this room?’ That is her default. So I think they're perfectly paired."

== Critical reviews ==
"Person of Interest" received generally positive reviews from critics. Maggie Fremont of Vulture gave the episode a 4 star rating out of 5 and wrote, "Bradley has really crossed a line this time — with Yanko, yes, but surely also with her own journalistic integrity as well. It doesn't seem like anyone will be speaking on Bradley's trustworthiness anytime soon."

Michel Ghanem of Elle wrote, "I don’t know about you, but I’m still reeling from last week’s episode of The Morning Show and the departure of Greta Lee, but I like that this season is keeping us on our toes."

Denis Kimathi of TV Fanatic gave the episode a 3 star rating out of 5 and wrote, "The worst thing an episode of a TV show can do is make me feel nothing. The second worst thing is to make me feel dissatisfied with what I just watched. This episode is heavy on the latter." Matthew Fox of Show Snob wrote, "This went about as expected. Bradley is out of chances and out of choices. It felt all-too predictable that she’d end up having to play ball with the FBI. The look on Yanko's face said it all. Bradley has been noteworthy for fighting for the little guy and taking bold swings, and this will likely change things for her forever. Hopefully Yanko can find some peace with Ariana, but his anger toward Bradley makes it clear there will be some changes at UBN."
