= Love the Questions =

- The Morning Show episode
- Episode no.: Season 4 Episode 4
- Directed by: Stacie Passon
- Written by: Christiana Mbakwe Medina
- Cinematography by: John Grillo
- Editing by: Sidney Wolinsky
- Original release date: October 8, 2025
- Running time: 46 minutes

Guest appearances
- Jeremy Irons as Martin Levy (special guest star); Néstor Carbonell as Yanko Flores; Ashley Reyes as Ariana; June Diane Raphael as Ashley Andrews; Piper Curda as Justice; Mark Adair-Rios as Isaac Rivera; Hannah Leder as Isabella; Amber Friendly as Layla Bell; Victoria Tate as Rena Robinson; Shari Belafonte as Julia; Wesam Keesh as Jamal; Rachel Marsh as Remy; Aflamu Johnson as Aflamu; Andrea Bendewald as Valérie

Episode chronology
← Previous "Tipping Point"	Next → "Amari"

"Love the Questions" is the fourth episode of the fourth season of the American drama television series The Morning Show, inspired by Brian Stelter's 2013 book Top of the Morning. It is the 34th overall episode of the series and was written by Christiana Mbakwe Medina, and directed by Stacie Passon. It was released on Apple TV+ on October 8, 2025.

The show examines the characters and culture behind a network broadcast morning news program. In the episode, the TMS crew cover an airplane incident, which jeopardizes Yanko's proposal plans. Meanwhile, Bradley is informed of damning new information regarding Wolf River, and Martin asks Alex to fix a problem.

The episode received positive reviews from critics, who praised the episode's tone and ending.

== Plot ==
Yanko prepares to propose to his girlfriend Ariana live on-air, rehearsing it with the crew. Chip tells Bradley that Kenneth Stockton, an environmental lawyer who handled the Wolf River depositions, had killed himself following a smear campaign by Eagle News, shocking her. Alex learns of Bradley and Chip's investigation into the Wolf River cover-up and confronts Bradley in front of the crew; Yanko is stunned to overhear that Bradley has been in contact with Claire. Alex ultimately gives Bradley and Chip two weeks to work on the investigation, and she offers to help negotiate with Eagle News for more information by trading a story about Pemberton.

Martin angrily contacts Alex, as Justice has run a story claiming that he plagiarized his book, which could jeopardize his career. Alex contacts Justice to discredit it, but she demands a job position at UBN in return; Alex refuses the request, greatly disappointing Martin. During a broadcast, The Morning Show staff receive notice that a plane is experiencing severe malfunctions, and is desperately trying to land at the John F. Kennedy International Airport. The show rushes to integrate the event into the broadcast, affecting Yanko's plans to propose. The plane safely lands, but Yanko decides against going forward with the proposal, distracted by the news of Claire's return. After the show ends, Ariana reveals that she already knew of Yanko's plans to propose, though he decides to put it off for the time being.

While waiting to meet with UBN lawyers, Cory bonds with Celine, who reveals her intentions to become CEO of UBN; she also presses Cory about the leverage he has on Stella. Cory tries to win her over with his plans to make a prestigious film division, but she is not dissuaded. Without any options and after a talk with Chip, Cory reluctantly reveals to Celine that Stella is having an affair with Miles. While devastated, she finally agrees to secure Cory's deal with the network. Meanwhile, Alex's negotiation with Eagle News is successful, resulting in Bradley discovering new evidence in the Wolf River story cover-up. She calls Chip, devastated to learn that Fred had hired Cory to help cover it up.

== Development ==
=== Production ===
The episode was written by Christiana Mbakwe Medina, and directed by Stacie Passon. This was Medina's first writing credit, and Passon's fourth directing credit.

=== Writing ===
On revealing Stella's affair, Billy Crudup said, "I hated that experience of Corey desperately needing to be back in so bad that he was willing to undermine the corporate ambitions of a former colleague with personal, damning information."

Marion Cotillard explained Celine's feelings when she is told about her husband's affair, "She is devastated, but I wanted her to be mad at herself for feeling but not really knowing. Because she loves to be ahead... And the fact that she didn't see it totally coming, I thought it was interesting that she would, in a way, be more affected by the fact that she's mad at herself than the real story that is happening." She added, "There's this very interesting kind of fight between brothers and sisters because, why wouldn't it be the daughter? It's not natural for those big, powerful — most of them male — to have a successor that would be a female. So that was very, very interesting for me to explore and study those families throughout those books."

== Critical reviews ==
"Love the Questions" received positive reviews from critics. Maggie Fremont of Vulture gave the episode a 4 star rating out of 5 and wrote, "Although I heartily subscribe to Cory Ellison's astute observation that the behind-the-scenes drama at UBN is much juicer than the on-air drama, it was nice to watch the entire TMS crew have to come together and handle a breaking news crisis, to see them working their asses off, and to actually see the magic of Alex and Bradley this show is always going on about. Sure, by the end of “Love the Questions,” it's the behind-the-scenes drama we'll remember, but the little change of pace was fun."

Kimberly Roots of TVLine wrote, "It's madness. I love it. I've said it before, but when this show chooses to go bananapants, it's at its best. And kudos to Nestor Carbonell for fully committing to the awkward, funny, bizarre bit."

Denis Kimathi of TV Fanatic gave the episode a 4.8 star rating out of 5 and wrote, "It's some excellent stuff that makes the episode so satisfying to watch. Apart from the arcs, almost everyone from the old gang is back, and for the first time, they don't feel disconnected."
