= My Roman Empire =

- The Morning Show episode
- Episode no.: Season 4 Episode 1
- Directed by: Mimi Leder
- Written by: Charlotte Stoudt; Zander Lehmann
- Cinematography by: David Lanzenberg
- Editing by: Carole Kravetz Aykanian
- Original release date: September 17, 2025
- Running time: 56 minutes

Guest appearances
- Jeremy Irons as Martin Levy; Boyd Holbrook as Brodie; Aaron Pierre as Miles; William Jackson Harper as Ben; Will Arnett as Doug Klassen; John Hoogenakker as Andy Montgomery; Rachel Marsh as Remy; Alain Ali Washnevsky as Arsham Nazeri; Haaz Sleiman as Mehdi Ali; Hannah Leder as Isabella; Shari Belafonte as Julia; Victoria Tate as Rena Robinson; Amber Friendly as Layla Bell; Joe Pacheco as Bart Daley; Theo Iyer as Kyle; Aflamu Johnson as Aflamu; Violett Beane as Sunny Stuber; Wesam Keesh as Jamal; Andrea Bendewald as Valérie

Episode chronology
← Previous "The Overview Effect"	Next → "The Revolution Will Be Televised"

"My Roman Empire" is the first episode of the fourth season of the American drama television series The Morning Show, inspired by Brian Stelter's 2013 book Top of the Morning. It is the 31st overall episode of the series and was written by executive producers Charlotte Stoudt and Zander Lehmann, and directed by executive producer Mimi Leder. It was released on Apple TV+ on September 17, 2025.

The series follows the characters and culture behind a network broadcast morning news program, The Morning Show. After allegations of sexual misconduct, the male co-anchor of the program, Mitch Kessler, is forced off the show. It follows Mitch's co-host, Alex Levy, and a conservative reporter Bradley Jackson, who attracts the attention of the show's producers after a viral video. In the episode, UBA has merged with NBN, but face controversy when Alex tries to help an Iranian fencer and her father defect their country.

The episode received positive reviews from critics, who praised the new storylines and performances.

== Plot ==
In April 2024, Stella announces an AI-generated program that will translate presenters' voices into 40 languages. They plan to launch this alongside the 2024 Summer Olympics, which will be broadcast on UBN after an impending merger has been approved.

Before her interview with an Iranian fencer named Roya Nazeri and her father, Arsham, Alex is given a note by Arsham, saying “We want to defect”. Alex triggers a fire alarm and helps them escape from their Iranian handlers. She and the staff soon learn that Arsham is a scientist with the Iranian nuclear program, and Stella fears that the actions could jeopardize the network’s Olympics deal. Board member Celine Dumont demands that they take immediate action. In Los Angeles, Cory works as a producer on a movie, but his lead actress has just quit and he struggles to find a replacement. He meets with Alex's agent, Doug, who does not want to help or be associated with him.

Bradley is in West Virginia, where she is on parole and working as a teacher at a community college. Mia visits her to ask her to return to the show, but she declines. Bradley is contacted by an anonymous source, who states that the Martel Chemical Plant has been responsible for poisoning animals and causing cancer in people, urging her to look into it since UBN is not reporting on it. Bradley convinces her FBI handler to let her go to New York, but is told to report back on anything she finds.

Desperate, Alex visits her estranged father Martin, a distinguished law professor. Alex asks Martin for help with Roya’s situation, through his contacts at the Department of State. He agrees, on the condition that Alex give a student writer material for an alumni magazine profile on him. Back in New York, Alex reunites with Bradley, but they get into an argument when the former claims it was not wise to bring her back. Later, Alex calls Cory, saying they must talk.

== Development ==
=== Production ===
The episode was written by executive producers Charlotte Stoudt and Zander Lehmann, and directed by executive producer Mimi Leder. This was Stoudt's third writing credit, Lehmann's second writing credit, and Leder's 12th directing credit.

=== Writing ===
Jeremy Irons was confirmed to join the series in July 2024, in a recurring role as Alex's father. Prior to his casting, Irons had never watched the series, but was persuaded by people close to him, "I watched a bit and got the feel of it and saw the pacing of it and the subject matter, and thought it was great." According to Stoudt, the series was looking for a "titan" that could make Alex look smaller in comparison, "(Jeremy and Jen) are an interesting mashup, but they fit seamlessly. We see a vulnerability to Alex that we've never seen before, which was very moving and compelling." Aniston was also interested in exploring Alex's family background, "Why is Alex who she is? And this [interaction] gives a little peek into the world that she grew up in."

On the new status of Alex and Bradley, Reese Witherspoon explained, "We're in different places now. [Bradley]'s feeling very tentative. She manages to somehow get back onto the network, but she's not in Alex’s good graces because of the end of Season, and how she pulled Alex into her messy life." Director Mimi Leder offered her perspective, "It's partly that she thinks Alex is right, and I also feel that Bradley needs to redeem herself from her sins of Season 3. Deep, deep down inside, she's an incredible journalist and truth-seeker. She's there because she has a story to tell, and she's going to find a way to do it any way she can. And telling that story is part of her redemption."

== Critical reviews ==
"My Roman Empire" received positive reviews from critics. Maggie Fremont of Vulture gave the episode a 3 star rating out of 5 and wrote, "Do I have Stockholm syndrome, or has The Morning Show only gotten better the more it's distanced itself from its wannabe prestige-drama beginnings and instead embraced its soapy insanity? I'm pretty sure it's the latter, but one never knows."

Kimberly Roots of TVLine wrote, "Alex is boss, Bradley is back, and Cory is broke. That's the big news to come out of The Morning Show's Season 4 premiere. It's all intriguing, of course. But if you've been watching the Apple TV+ series for a while, you know that what's going on behind the headlines is often a heck of a lot more interesting, sexy and/or ridiculous in the best way possible. And I am pleased to report that is certainly the case in this week's hour." Lacy Baugher of Telltale TV gave the episode a 3.5 star rating out of 5 and wrote, "The Morning Show remains one of the most enjoyable trainwrecks on TV, in a love to love to hate it kind of way. But is it too much to ask for just a smidge of self-awareness? The answer: Apparently! (Or, at least, for right now.)"

Michel Ghanem of Elle wrote, "I often poke fun at The Morning Show for how audacious these storylines can be, but the truth is, I simply can't wait for the inevitable melodrama and just how far they're willing to go for entertaining television." Denis Kimathi of TV Fanatic gave the episode a 4.7 star rating out of 5 and wrote, "'My Roman Empire' strikes a good balance of reintroducing the characters after close to two years while setting up the rest of the season. It promises to be one for the books."
