= Un Bel Di (The Morning Show) =

- The Morning Show episode
- Episode no.: Season 4 Episode 9
- Directed by: Mimi Leder
- Story by: Colleen Bradley
- Teleplay by: Micah Schraft; Zander Lehmann
- Cinematography by: David Lanzenberg
- Editing by: Carole Kravetz Aykanian
- Original release date: November 12, 2025
- Running time: 44 minutes

Guest appearances
- Néstor Carbonell as Yanko Flores; William Jackson Harper as Ben; Tig Notaro as Amanda Robinson; Costa Ronin as Dmitry Ivanov; Alano Miller as Marcus Hunter; Arnaud Valois as Arnaud Dumont; Kenneth Choi as John; Hannah Leder as Isabella; Amber Friendly as Layla Bell; Shari Belafonte as Julia; Wesam Keesh as Jamal

Episode chronology
← Previous "The Parent Trap"	Next → "Knowing Violation"

"Un Bel Di" is the ninth episode of the fourth season of the American drama television series The Morning Show, inspired by Brian Stelter's 2013 book Top of the Morning. It is the 39th overall episode of the series and was written by executive producers Micah Schraft and Zander Lehmann from a story by Colleen Bradley, and directed by executive producer Mimi Leder. It was released on Apple TV+ on November 12, 2025.

The show examines the characters and culture behind a network broadcast morning news program. In the episode, Bradley is detained in Belarus, and Alex is forced to ask Paul Marks for help. Meanwhile, Cory continues bonding with Celine after his mother's death, eventually uncovering more information.

The episode received mixed reviews from critics, who were divided over its writing and tone.

== Plot ==
Bradley arrives in Minsk, Belarus, but is detained at the airport when she is suspected of being involved in espionage. Alex informs Celine and Ben about the Wolf River investigation, and Celine asks the staff to contain the situation. Chip also informs Alex that Bradley could be charged for lying to the FBI. After confronting Chip, Mia learns the truth about Bradley and offers to help.

Desperate, Alex meets with Paul Marks for help, who agrees to leverage his connections with Russian oligarch Dmitry Ivanov. Mia, Alex and Paul attend an opera show with Dmitry and his wife to negotiate Bradley's release, but Mia overhears Dmitry expressing that he wants a better deal. Upon learning that Dmitry wants to obtain access to an AI software developed by Paul, Alex proposes that UBN license the software, despite the potential federal repercussions.

Mourning his mother's death, Cory continues to bond with Celine, and the two nearly have sex; Celine is later seen searching through Martha's personal belongings for evidence for the Wolf River cover-up.

Leaving the opera, Alex is devastated when Chip informs her that the deal has fallen through and Bradley has been formally charged with conspiracy. It is revealed that Celine sabotaged Alex and Paul's deal after receiving a tip from Paul's chief of staff, Amanda. Back home, Cory puts on his father's jacket, and finds an EPA contamination report for Wolf River stuffed in its pocket.

== Development ==
=== Production ===
The episode was written by executive producers Micah Schraft and Zander Lehmann from a story by Colleen Bradley, and directed by executive producer Mimi Leder. This was Schraft's fourth writing credit, Lehmann's fourth writing credit, Bradley's first writing credit, and Leder's 14th directing credit.

== Critical reviews ==
"Un Bel Di" received mixed reviews from critics. Maggie Fremont of Vulture gave the episode a 2 star rating out of 5 and wrote, "If at the beginning of this season, if you had told me we'd reach a point when Alex Levy had to team up with Paul Marks to negotiate a deal with a Russian oligarch at the opera in order to save Bradley Jackson from imprisonment in a Belarusian prison, I would've immediately driven you to the hospital because you must be in the throes of a deep and disturbing mental breakdown. But this is exactly what happens on the penultimate episode of The Morning Show season four. This show is hilarious. Remember when it used to be about people working on network morning TV?"

Emma Fraser of The Daily Beast wrote, "How Alex hasn't clocked that Celine is pulling these strings is beyond me; she definitely shouldn't quit her day job. But The Morning Show dipping its toe into covert waters this late in the season is welcome, proving once again that it is at the top of the outlandish TV game."

Denis Kimathi of TV Fanatic gave the episode a 4.5 star rating out of 5 and wrote, "The Morning Show Season 4 is a shell of what the show used to be. The series has become overcrowded with characters, yet the runtime and episode count have remained the same." Matthew Fox of Show Snob wrote, "Some series have the big swings in the penultimate episode, others wait for the finale. My assumption is that this season of The Morning Show is leaning toward the latter. We don’t get much resolution this week, but the balls are all in the air."
