= Knowing Violation =

- The Morning Show episode
- Episode no.: Season 4 Episode 10
- Directed by: Mimi Leder
- Written by: Charlotte Stoudt; Joey Longstreet
- Cinematography by: David Lanzenberg
- Editing by: Carole Kravetz Aykanian
- Original release date: November 19, 2025
- Running time: 55 minutes

Guest appearances
- Jeremy Irons as Martin Levy (special guest star); Néstor Carbonell as Yanko Flores; Aaron Pierre as Miles; William Jackson Harper as Ben; Arnaud Valois as Arnaud Dumont; Rushi Kota as Kabir; Wesam Keesh as Jamal; Hannah Leder as Isabella; Amber Friendly as Layla Bell; Joe Pacheco as Bart Daley; Victoria Tate as Rena Robinson

Episode chronology
| ← Previous "Un Bel Di" | Next → — |

"Knowing Violation" is the tenth episode and season finale of the fourth season of the American drama television series The Morning Show, inspired by Brian Stelter's 2013 book Top of the Morning. It is the 40th overall episode of the series and was written by executive producer Charlotte Stoudt and Joey Longstreet, and directed by executive producer Mimi Leder. It was released on Apple TV+ on November 19, 2025.

The show examines the characters and culture behind a network broadcast morning news program. In the episode, Alex and Chip receive new information regarding the Wolf River story, while Mia finds incriminating evidence. Meanwhile, Cory is confronted by Miles over his affair with Celine, putting his loyalty in jeopardy.

The episode received mostly positive reviews from critics, who considered it a strong closure to the season's storylines.

== Plot ==
Twenty-eight days into Bradley's imprisonment, Alex and Chip receive dozens of documents, finding several inconsistencies with the EPA's report. Chip asks Cory about the content, but he claims he is not involved.

Having begun a sexual relationship with Celine, Cory offers to give the EPA report to the Dumont family if Celine helps negotiate Bradley's release. However, Cory contemplates his decision when Miles reveals that Martha brokered the Wolf River cover-up in exchange for getting Cory a job at UBA. Ben seeks Mia's help in investigating the person responsible for Alex's deepfake audio, and Mia discovers that Celine orchestrated the deepfake. Informed by Mia, Alex confronts Celine, demanding her resignation. Celine refuses and instead demands her resignation, as she knows about her involvement with Paul and Dmitry. Alex asks Cory for help, but walks out in disgust upon finding that he is having an affair with Celine. Miles confronts Cory over his affair with Celine, and warns him to step aside.

The following day, Alex announces her resignation on live television. At home, she is visited by Martin, who suggests that she sue Celine for wrongful dismissal. Alex and Martin issue a press release, denouncing Celine's involvement in Wolf River, accusing UBN of corruption, and revealing their intent to sue. Celine refuses to run the story, but Ben runs it regardless. Outraged, Celine calls Cory and threatens to keep Bradley in prison unless Alex stops the conference. However, Cory broadcasts the phone call live during the conference, and it is revealed that Cory has given Alex the EPA report.

Celine tries to leave the building, until Ben and security stop her. With her reputation damaged, Celine leaves the country and Miles behind, while the board prepares to find an interim CEO in the next few days. Alex thanks Paul for help, and he proclaims they are even. She takes a private jet to the Minsk National Airport, where Bradley is released from a car. Surprised, Bradley has an emotional reunion with Alex, and they leave in the jet.

== Development ==
=== Production ===
The episode was written by executive producer Charlotte Stoudt and Joey Longstreet, and directed by executive producer Mimi Leder. This was Stoudt's fourth writing credit, Longstreet's first writing credit, and Leder's 15th directing credit.

=== Writing ===
Bradley's detainment in Belarus was inspired by the real-life case of Evan Gershkovich, a The Wall Street Journal journalist who was detained in Russia in 2023 under charges of espionage. Charlotte Stoudt said, "We were just really struck by how dangerous the world is becoming, this thing of hostage diplomacy, just kind of now being part of foreign policy. You know, just take someone who's valuable and get what you can out of it." Regarding the final scene, she added, "It's an obvious thing to say, but I feel people do need to feel hope on that tarmac. It's dark out there, and you can't see beyond the runway; everything's in the shadows. But as long as these two women have each other, they'll be okay." Director Mimi Leder also commented, "It was a very emotional scene with two women who are deeply passionate about the world."

Regarding Cory's actions, Stoudt explained, "Cory is in such an emotionally unstable place. If his mother hadn't done what she'd done, if the Bradley thing hadn't happened, I think he would have had a plan. He would have had a clear way through this. But I think he's so emotionally wrecked that it takes him a while to get his bearings. And then he has that memory of Bradley, and he realizes ‘I was a bad boyfriend. She said were gonna mess up, but it still has to be okay.’ He did not give her grace, and she messed up. I think that was a lesson he had to learn the hard way." She also said, "He’s somebody who is so good at tap dancing in and out of situations that you're interested in seeing what actually could stop him and change him. He's really shaken by all of this, which is why it takes him a minute to do the right thing."

== Critical reviews ==
"Knowing Violation" received mostly positive reviews from critics. Maggie Fremont of Vulture gave the episode a 4 star rating out of 5 and wrote, "Celine's comeuppance is fun to watch, but so was Marion Cotillard on the banana pants program that is The Morning Show. I hope Celine is simply down and not out. May she and her perfect suits return to wreak havoc on UBN in the future."

Emma Fraser of The Daily Beast wrote, "As bonkers as this show is, it knows how to wrap up a season." Michel Ghanem of Elle wrote, "It's a new dawn at UBN, once again, with most threads of this season resolved. We'll have to see who decides to have an explosive affair next in the already-renewed fifth season of The Morning Show."

Denis Kimathi of TV Fanatic gave the episode a 4.8 star rating out of 5 and wrote, "The Morning Show Season 4 had a great start but lost momentum in the middle of the season, only picking up pace in the final two episodes. But sometimes it doesn't matter how you start; if you finish strong, it doesn't matter. The Morning Show Season 4 Episode 10, “Knowing Violation,” is a strong finish." Matthew Fox of Show Snob wrote, "What a wild season. We had one of the most loaded casts yet, and by the end it's clear we're back focused on our core players — Alex, Bradley, Chip, Mia, and Cory. The show has been picked up for a fifth season, but it's unclear where we go from here."
