= The Revolution Will Be Televised (The Morning Show) =

- The Morning Show episode
- Episode no.: Season 4 Episode 2
- Directed by: Mimi Leder
- Written by: Micah Schraft
- Cinematography by: David Lanzenberg
- Editing by: Andrew Gust
- Original release date: September 24, 2025
- Running time: 52 minutes

Guest appearances
- Néstor Carbonell as Yanko Flores; Boyd Holbrook as Brodie; Aaron Pierre as Miles; William Jackson Harper as Ben; Kenneth Choi as John; Alano Miller as Marcus Hunter; June Diane Raphael as Ashley Andrews; Piper Curda as Justice; Hannah Leder as Isabella; Shari Belafonte as Julia; Rachel Marsh as Remy; Amber Friendly as Layla Bell; Alain Ali Washnevsky as Arsham Nazeri; Ava Lalezarzadeh; Violett Beane as Sunny Stuber; Wesam Keesh as Jamal; Andrea Bendewald as Valérie

Episode chronology
← Previous "My Roman Empire"	Next → "Tipping Point"

"The Revolution Will Be Televised" is the second episode of the fourth season of the American drama television series The Morning Show, inspired by Brian Stelter's 2013 book Top of the Morning. It is the 32nd overall episode of the series and was written by executive producer Micah Schraft, and directed by executive producer Mimi Leder. It was released on Apple TV+ on September 24, 2025.

The series follows the characters and culture behind a network broadcast morning news program, The Morning Show. After allegations of sexual misconduct, the male co-anchor of the program, Mitch Kessler, is forced off the show. It follows Mitch's co-host, Alex Levy, and a conservative reporter Bradley Jackson, who attracts the attention of the show's producers after a viral video. In the episode, Alex faces a new controversy when a deepfake implicates her with Roya's situation, while Bradley meets with Chip to find the informant.

The episode received positive reviews from critics, who praised the performances, particularly Billy Crudup.

== Plot ==
Bradley joins Chris and Yanko on The Morning Show and addresses Hal's role in the Capitol attack. After, her informant sets a meeting for later in the week. Bradley meets with Chip, hoping he can help him find the informant, as well as asking about the suspected cover-up at UBA. He reluctantly agrees, while also refusing Bradley's offer to come back to UBN.

Alex is told that the Department of State will question her for helping Roya, due to a leaked video that shows Alex and Roya planning the escape in advance. Despite Alex claiming that it is a deepfake, Stella and Celine decide to temporarily suspend her as they resolve the situation. In trying to find out more about deepfakes, Alex is disgusted to find that there are pornographic depictions of her. Alex meets with Cory, who arrived from Los Angeles; he tells her that she needs to earn the trust of the board, led by Leslie Reynolds, the daughter of former board member Cybil.

Cory asks Stella for help in funding his film, but she declines to be involved with him after his misconduct scandal. Stella confides this encounter to Miles, Celine's husband with whom she is having an affair. Miles has a conversation with Cory, asking him to stop bothering Stella and the network. The next day, a protest breaks out on the street, shutting it down. As she leaves to meet with Leslie, Alex is forced to deal with a student of her father who is writing a profile on him. There, they stumble upon protesters and with the student's help, Alex interviews one of the protesters, footage of which is discussed during the next broadcast of TMS. Bradley, joined by Chip, waits for her informant, who is a no-show.

Chip contacts Bradley, revealing that the informant is Claire, her former assistant. Celine tells Alex that they have successfully confirmed that the leaked video was fake, saving her reputation. Cory reveals to Stella that he knows about her affair with Miles, as he found her lighter in his loft. To her shock, Cory agrees to keep her affair a secret in exchange for an overall deal at UBN.

== Development ==
=== Production ===
The episode was written by executive producer Micah Schraft, and directed by executive producer Mimi Leder. This was Schraft's second writing credit, and Leder's 13th directing credit.

=== Writing ===
Showrunner Charlotte Stoudt explained that the writers were interested in exploring the theme of artificial intelligence, "AI is a massive, massive complex topic, so we tried to ask: How are people genuinely using it in newsrooms? Start there: what is our world thinking about AI? What is the world of journalism thinking? With all of our stories, unless the topic can bring out something emotionally resonant and challenge a character on a very personal level, then it doesn’t belong in the season. What happens when tech becomes a way to look in the mirror and ask: Who am I really? And, am I on the right path? There are many, many things we could have covered that we didn’t, that are in the world and are incredibly urgent."

Stoudt also confirmed Claire's return, saying "The show is always asking ‘How can you achieve change?’ Alex represents trying to change things from the inside. Bradley straddles inside and outside, and is a little split on either space. Claire is very definitely on the outside."

== Critical reviews ==
"The Revolution Will Be Televised" received positive reviews from critics. Maggie Fremont of Vulture gave the episode a 3 star rating out of 5 and wrote, "In case it hasn't been obvious enough, The Morning Show makes clear in “The Revolution Will Be Televised” that the dynamic shared between the series and its audience is very much the audience going “This show is insane, what could be more batshit than this?” and The Morning Show going “Hold my beer.” And then it does something like have the Iranian government go after Alex Levy with deep fakes. The Iranian government. The more bonkers this series gets, the more I enjoy it, and that is simply my truth."

Kimberly Roots of TVLine wrote, "“He is risen,” Cory Ellison gleefully proclaims at the end of this week's The Morning Show. It's not lost on him (or us) that he's talking about himself in messianic terms; dude's never had a problem with self-esteem. This time, however I'll allow it, because he's actually on the cusp of pulling off the miraculous: a return to power at the network that ousted him last season."

Michel Ghanem of Elle wrote, "And just like that, Bradley is back at UBN. Personally, I'm still reeling from last week's bonkers episode, but I'm happily signing up for more chaos — we could all use some escapist television right now." Denis Kimathi of TV Fanatic gave the episode a 4.7 star rating out of 5 and wrote, "“The Revolution Shall Be Televised” is another fantastic hour of The Morning Show that deals with a pertinent issue and delivers drama. What more could we ask for?"
