= Amari (The Morning Show) =

- The Morning Show episode
- Episode no.: Season 4 Episode 5
- Directed by: Millicent Shelton
- Written by: Vanessa Baden Kelly
- Cinematography by: Tobias Datum
- Editing by: Blake Maniquis
- Original release date: October 15, 2025
- Running time: 57 minutes

Guest appearances
- Boyd Holbrook as Brodie; William Jackson Harper as Ben; Merrin Dungey as Joy Taylor; Ashley Romans as Tunde Johnson; Nichelle Hines as Zaria; Alano Miller as Marcus Hunter; John Hoogenakker as Andy Montgomery; Clive Standen as Andre Ford; Amber Friendly as Layla Bell; Hannah Leder as Isabella; Violett Beane as Sunny Stuber; Rachel Marsh as Remy; Shari Belafonte as Julia

Episode chronology
← Previous "Love the Questions"	Next → "If Then"

"Amari" is the fifth episode of the fourth season of the American drama television series The Morning Show, inspired by Brian Stelter's 2013 book Top of the Morning. It is the 35th overall episode of the series and was written by co-executive producer Vanessa Baden Kelly, and directed by Millicent Shelton. It was released on Apple TV+ on October 15, 2025.

The show examines the characters and culture behind a network broadcast morning news program. In the episode, Christine faces a controversy from her past, while Mia discovers that Alex is preventing her from finding a new job. Meanwhile, Bradley begins to investigate Cory's background for more information on the Wolf River story.

The episode received mostly positive reviews from critics, with high praise towards Pittman's and Beharie's performances in the episode.

== Plot ==
During a date with Cory, Bradley secretly checks his e-mails to find anything about the Wolf River story, and she uncovers a picture of a woman standing next to Kenneth Stockton. Meanwhile, Mia applies for a position at Defy Media and impresses Joy, the interviewer. Alex, unhappy with Ben's handling of the network, dissuades Joy from hiring Mia when she is contacted as a reference; Mia is later informed that the offer has been withdrawn.

Meanwhile, Christine receives massive online backlash when an anonymous source accuses her of doping at the 2016 Summer Olympics. Christine discovers that the anonymous source is her former teammate Tunde, and she leaves an angry, vulgar voicemail for Tunde; the voicemail message is leaked and aired on Brodie Hartman's UBN podcast The Brofessional. Mia reconciles with Christine and convinces her to appear on Brodie's podcast with Tunde to shut down the allegations. During the podcast, Tunde reveals Christine's prescription receipts for anabolic steroids. Stunned, Christine confirms the doping allegations live on-air, tearfully disclosing that she used the drugs to cope with the loss of her baby son Amari.

Despite the positive reception to Christine's podcast appearance, Alex confronts Mia for organizing the interview, as it could potentially jeopardize the network's upcoming Olympics coverage. Mia rebuffs Alex's concerns and lambasts her for dissuading Defy Media, further stating that she is done with UBN. That night, Bradley visits Cory, but he reveals that he discovered her checking his e-mails through his search history. She finally questions him over the Wolf River story; he admits he had the story covered on Fred's orders, but states he was not involved in the smear campaign and was unaware of Kenneth's suicide. Heartbroken over Bradley's actions, he asks her to leave. When Bradley returns to her apartment, she finds her FBI handler waiting for her.

== Development ==
=== Production ===
The episode was written by co-executive producer Vanessa Baden Kelly, and directed by Millicent Shelton. This was Baden Kelly's first writing credit, and Shelton's second directing credit.

=== Writing ===
Nicole Beharie admitted surprise when she was given the script for the episode, saying "So I had gotten a little sprinkle, and then once I got in the full shower, I was just drenched. I was like, “This is going to be a doozy and a major departure for Chris, and for what we expect from her and know her to be." She added, "Life can be so big, and you can be on the front page and then these massive burdens that are beautifully depicted in a show. But when you're working that stuff out in real life, it's not necessarily the greatest feeling. I hope that people who felt any of this kind of loss in any capacity feel seen and taken care of, and like we did it with dignity."

== Critical reviews ==
"Amari" received mostly positive reviews from critics. Maggie Fremont of Vulture gave the episode a 4 star rating out of 5 and wrote, "“Amari” is a showcase episode for Beharie, and she rises to the occasion at every turn. Of course, this means Beharie's character is forced into the hot seat when a rumor about her doping to win her medals gains traction on social media, and she must save her reputation and career. How does she go about doing this? By coming clean. Something quite novel for the people in this series!"

Michel Ghanem of Elle wrote, "After last week's explosive final few minutes, I expected this episode to come out swinging with a Celine and Stella showdown. But instead, we're zooming out to focus on sidelined characters like Ben and Chris. Is this ensemble too large to maintain plot momentum? Perhaps. Still, after Beharie's Emmy nomination last season, I was waiting to see how The Morning Show would spotlight her this year, and the actress doesn't disappoint." Denis Kimathi of TV Fanatic gave the episode a 4.7 star rating out of 5 and wrote, "Halfway through the season, The Morning Show has made some big moves that promise to set up an even more exciting second half. We are yet to explore the fallout of Celine's discovery, Cory's return to UBA, Mia's departure from the newsroom, and, of course, Wolf River."

=== Accolades ===
TVLine named Nicole Beharie as an honorable mention for the "Performer of the Week" for the week of October 18, 2025, for her performance in the episode. The site wrote, "If you watch (or rewatch) one scene from this week's The Morning Show, make it Chris' appearance on Bro's podcast. The character went into the interview resolutely denying allegations that she'd used performance-enhancing drugs to secure her Olympic wins. With her barely measured tone and cutting glances, Beharie filled the room with Chris' frustration — and we were right there with her... until her former teammate provided unassailable proof that the accusations were true. When you revisit the scene, pay particular attention to the moment that Chris realized the jig is up: Beharie's choices were stunning. There's no way out but to own what Chris did, so Beharie put her head down and plowed through with a matter-of-fact recitation of what happened... until the Olympian came to the topic of the son she delivered too early for him to survive. Beharie had her character break so believably, and so totally, that there was no way not to feel for her: She made a huge mistake, yes, but the price of that was now public humiliation as she re-lived the worst moment of her life. It was awful. It was beautiful. It was some of Beharie's best work."
