= The Parent Trap (The Morning Show) =

- The Morning Show episode
- Episode no.: Season 4 Episode 8
- Directed by: Miguel Arteta
- Written by: Sharon Hoffman; Micah Schraft
- Cinematography by: John Grillo
- Editing by: Sidney Wolinsky
- Original release date: November 5, 2025
- Running time: 46 minutes

Guest appearances
- Jeremy Irons as Martin Levy (special guest star); Boyd Holbrook as Brodie; Lindsay Duncan as Martha; Arnaud Valois as Arnaud Dumont; Lauren Lapkus; Rachel Marsh as Remy; Theo Iyer as Kyle

Episode chronology
← Previous "Person of Interest"	Next → "Un Bel Di"

"The Parent Trap" is the eighth episode of the fourth season of the American drama television series The Morning Show, inspired by Brian Stelter's 2013 book Top of the Morning. It is the 38th overall episode of the series and was written by consulting producer Sharon Hoffman and executive producer Micah Schraft, and directed by Miguel Arteta. It was released on Apple TV+ on November 5, 2025.

The show examines the characters and culture behind a network broadcast morning news program. In the episode, Alex tries to secure an interview with Joe Biden, while having to deal with a new controversy from his father. Meanwhile, Cory's mother takes a devastating decision, and Bradley sets out to meet with a new whistleblower.

The episode received positive reviews from critics, with particular praise towards the performances.

== Plot ==
As Alex tries to secure an interview with Joe Biden, she confronts Bradley for getting Claire arrested. Bradley defends her actions, maintaining that she was under pressure. She also reveals that she is travelling to Belarus to interview another whistleblower, asking Alex to sign off on it, but is refused.

Celine is advised by her brother to return to France, as their family is unimpressed with her handling of UBN. Cory learns that his dementia-ridden mother plans to die by euthanasia. Despite his pleas to convince her otherwise, Martha professes her love for Cory, and then secretly ingests a euthanasia tablet while he is away. Upset over his mother's death, Cory goes on a drug-fuelled binge with Celine.

Martin is arrested after urinating on a statue in public, and Alex is forced to take him home. Martin asks to appear on TMS to defend himself against Justice's plagiarism accusations, but Alex refuses. He is allowed by Brodie to guest on The Brofessional where Martin defends himself and they discuss the First Amendment. Alex forces Martin to exit the show early, believing Brodie was trying to get back at Alex over their previous sexual encounter. On the drive home, Alex is informed that the White House has passed on the interview after Martin's appearance.

Angry, Alex confronts Martin for his treatment and failing to appreciate her. Martin is unsympathetic and coldly reveals that he has always blamed Alex for the disappearance of his wife, who ran away after struggling with postpartum depression. Devastated, Alex visits Bradley at her apartment, but only finds Chip, who tells her she already left for Belarus. They are worried about Bradley, as she has not reported back.

== Development ==
=== Production ===
The episode was written by consulting producer Sharon Hoffman and executive producer Micah Schraft, and directed by Miguel Arteta. This was Hoffman's first writing credit, Schraft's third writing credit, and Arteta's third directing credit.

=== Writing ===
Billy Crudup explained Cory's reaction to his mother's death, "The notion of Lindsay, my mom, making a decision like that, it was very, very easy to access any kind of attachment I had. In fact, I think it was harder to restrain it for me, because he hasn't had many cathartic moments. And for somebody who's holding so long to be given the opportunity, there were stores and stores of that."

On Martin's confession to Alex, Jeremy Irons said, "I think he realizes how he's messed up and what a terrific person she she[sic] is. I also think it's the relief of having actually said what he had to say, and to hear what she had to say. I think it's very important for all of us to to{sic] not hold back, not hold in, but to let out what the problem is." He added, "It's those little things, memory, which make something seem as real as I hope it did. It certainly felt real, and you, as an actor, use all that."

== Critical reviews ==
"The Parent Trap" received positive reviews from critics. Maggie Fremont of Vulture gave the episode a 4 star rating out of 5 and wrote, "It's a shame that Alex and Cory have such a distaste for each other at the moment, because both of their parents are psychotic in their own special ways, but psychotic nonetheless, and those two would have a lot to share after the events of “The Parent Trap.”"

Michel Ghanem of Elle wrote, "The Morning Show already threw us a curveball with Greta Lee's mid-season departure, and now Cory's mother. This doesn't bode well for anyone else in this cast, Witherspoon included. Anything's possible in these last two episodes."

Denis Kimathi of TV Fanatic gave the episode a 4 star rating out of 5 and wrote, "Given the previous episode, “Parent Trap,” feels like an upgrade. I'm not sure how I feel about the lack of plot development, but we'll see what happens in the next two episodes. However, a show with three weak episodes now is not doing itself any favors." Matthew Fox of Show Snob wrote, "I enjoyed the journey. I also felt for Alex, who was badly shaken by her father's callous revelations. This was a solid episode, even if it is somewhat of a departure from our larger ongoing stories. I'm curious to see where this arc with Bradley goes next."
