= The Overview Effect =

"The Morning Show" episode

- The Morning Show episode
- Episode no.: Season 3 Episode 10
- Directed by: Mimi Leder
- Story by: Charlotte Stoudt; Anya Leta
- Teleplay by: Anya Leta
- Cinematography by: John Grillo
- Editing by: Carole Kravetz Aykanian; Plummy Tucker
- Original release date: November 8, 2023
- Running time: 56 minutes

Guest appearances
- Joe Tippett as Hal Jackson; Holland Taylor as Cybil Reynolds; Tig Notaro as Amanda Robinson; Natalie Morales as Kate Danton; Hannah Leder as Isabella; Shari Belafonte as Julia; Victoria Tate as Rena Robinson; Amber Friendly as Layla Bell; Joe Marinelli as Donny Spagnoli; Aflamu Johnson as Aflamu; Joe Pacheco as Bart Daley; Jack Conley as Earl; Stephen Fry as Leonard Cromwell

Episode chronology
← Previous "Update Your Priors"	Next → "My Roman Empire"

"The Overview Effect" is the tenth episode and season finale of the third season of the American drama television series The Morning Show, inspired by Brian Stelter's 2013 book Top of the Morning. It is the 30th overall episode of the series and was written by consulting producer Anya Leta from a story by Charlotte Stoudt and Leta, and directed by executive producer Mimi Leder. It was released on Apple TV+ on November 8, 2023.

The series follows the characters and culture behind a network broadcast morning news program, The Morning Show. After allegations of sexual misconduct, the male co-anchor of the program, Mitch Kessler, is forced off the show. It follows Mitch's co-host, Alex Levy, and a conservative reporter Bradley Jackson, who attracts the attention of the show's producers after a viral video. In the episode, Bradley faces a decision regarding her future, while Alex questions if Paul can be trusted.

The episode received positive reviews from critics, who praised the closure to the storylines. For the episode, Jennifer Aniston and Mark Duplass received nominations at the 76th Primetime Emmy Awards.

== Plot ==
In flashbacks, a young Bradley finds her father's car with bloody marks on the front side. She takes her bike and rides to the police station, reporting him to the authorities. Her father is arrested, and he exchanges a look with his daughter.

In present day, Cory (Billy Crudup) visits Bradley (Reese Witherspoon) to apologize for outing her. She refuses to speak with him, but warns him that Paul (Jon Hamm) knows about Hal's role in the Capitol attack. As Alex (Jennifer Aniston) keeps calling Bradley, she is shocked when Paul confesses that he supplied Cory's article to the Vault. When Paul mentions about Bradley covering for Hal (Joe Tippett), Alex visits her. Bradley is paranoid over losing Hal and mentions Paul's warning, fearing that he might be spying on her. She asks Alex to prevent the UBA sale from happening.

To check if Paul is spying on her, Alex sends a text to Bradley, changing the name of her hometown. When she gets home and talks with Paul, he mentions the name of the town, confirming Alex's fears. Cory is informed that he will be suspended, and despite his pleas to prevent the sale, Leonard (Stephen Fry) intends to sell UBA to get rid of the recent headlines. Desperate, Cory contacts a Sloan Management representative, who agrees to give UBA a large loan to help it survive, if the board can vote against Paul.

Yanko (Néstor Carbonell) and Christine (Nicole Beharie) invite Chip (Mark Duplass) to guest star in The Morning Show, and he surprises the staff by revealing that the sale will result in everyone losing their job. This helps convince part of the board in changing their position with the sale, but Paul is still confident in the deal. He offers $10 million to Cory and the promise of clearing his name if he stops fighting the deal, but he declines, even though he knows his career will be ruined. To prevent the sale, Alex meets with Laura (Julianna Margulies), convincing her to contact her network, NBN, for a potential merger.

On the day of the vote, Alex informs the board that NBN has accepted a merger, with an offer that surpasses Paul's initial deal. She also gets Paul to face Kate (Natalie Morales) and Stella (Greta Lee), revealing that Paul forced Kate to cut the transmission on his rocket and masterminded the hack to blame UBA and hide that his tech malfunctioned. Alex tells Paul to pull out of the deal or she will report the story and end Hyperion, and Paul is forced to leave defeated. Bradley also testifies, defending Cory of the allegations in the article. Some time later, Alex accompanies Bradley and Hal to an FBI building, where they willingly surrender to the authorities for their role in the Capitol attack.

== Development ==
=== Production ===
The episode was written by consulting producer Anya Leta from a story by executive producer Charlotte Stoudt and Leta, and directed by executive producer Mimi Leder. This was Leta's first writing credit, Stoudt's second writing credit, and Leder's 11th directing credit.

=== Writing ===
Regarding Bradley's decision to turn herself in to the FBI, showrunner Charlotte Stoudt explained, "I think [she's grappling with], ‘Can I forgive myself? Is there a way to redeem myself? How do I feel about what I did and why I did it?’ She has to really go in deep and question herself. I think it's gonna be a long road back to feeling herself."

== Critical reviews ==
"The Overview Effect" received positive reviews from critics. Max Gao of The A.V. Club gave the episode a "B+" grade and wrote, "Aniston and Reese Witherspoon are a true delight to watch onscreen, and I only wish that we had seen more of them together in these 10 episodes."

Maggie Fremont of Vulture gave the episode a 4 star rating out of 5 and wrote, "The Morning Show never feels more alive than when everyone is backstabbing each other. Backstabbing, backstabbing, launching people into space, backstabbing, singing “Ain’t No Mountain High Enough” with someone's mentally unstable mother, backstabbing. There. That's how you do insane TV right there." Kimberly Roots of TVLine wrote, "By the end of The Morning Show's Season 3 finale, Alex Levy has a) realized that Paul Marks was spying on everyone, b) thwarted his plans to acquire UBA, c) broken up with the tech billionaire and d) put in motion a potential merger between her network and its competitor, NBN. Not bad for an hour's time, eh?"

Meghan O'Keefe of Decider wrote, "While it's unclear how The Morning Show Season 4 will handle Bradley Jackson's latest storyline, Reese Witherspoon is still one of the show's executive producers and top-billed stars. That suggests that no matter what Bradley Jackson is doing next season, Reese Witherspoon will still be totally involved. Here's hoping we get a UBA+ show of Bradley live-streaming her jail experience." Lacy Baugher of Telltale TV gave the episode a 3.5 star rating out of 5 and wrote, "The Morning Show wraps up its most bonkers season to date with “The Overview Effect,” a surprisingly predictable finale that recasts UBA and its culture in the sort of heroic light the show has never really bothered to earn."

=== Accolades ===
Jennifer Aniston submitted the episode to support her nomination for Outstanding Lead Actress in a Drama Series, while Mark Duplass submitted it for Outstanding Supporting Actor in a Drama Series at the 76th Primetime Emmy Awards. Aniston would lose to Anna Sawai for Shōgun, while Duplass would lose to his co-star, Billy Crudup.
