= The Kármán Line =

- The Morning Show episode
- Episode no.: Season 3 Episode 1
- Directed by: Mimi Leder
- Written by: Charlotte Stoudt
- Cinematography by: John Grillo
- Editing by: Carole Kravetz Aykanian
- Original release date: September 13, 2023
- Running time: 54 minutes

Guest appearances
- Joe Tippett as Hal Jackson; Holland Taylor as Cybil Reynolds; Tig Notaro as Amanda Robinson; Hannah Leder as Isabella; Shari Belafonte as Julia; Esther Perel as Herself; Victoria Tate as Rena Robinson; Joe Marinelli as Donny Spagnoli; Tara Karsian as Gayle Berman; Choni Francis as RJ Smith; Eli Bildner as Joel Rapkin; Joe Pacheco as Bart Daley; Jack Conley as Earl; Mindy Kaling as Audra Khatri

Episode chronology
← Previous "Fever"	Next → "Ghost in the Machine"

"The Kármán Line" is the first episode of the third season of the American drama television series The Morning Show, inspired by Brian Stelter's 2013 book Top of the Morning. It is the 21st overall episode of the series and was written by executive producer Charlotte Stoudt, and directed by executive producer Mimi Leder. It was released on Apple TV+ on September 13, 2023.

The series follows the characters and culture behind a network broadcast morning news program, The Morning Show. After allegations of sexual misconduct, the male co-anchor of the program, Mitch Kessler, is forced off the show. It follows Mitch's co-host, Alex Levy, and a conservative reporter Bradley Jackson, who attracts the attention of the show's producers after a viral video. In the episode, the characters face new realities as the series jumps to March 2022.

The episode received generally positive reviews from critics, who praised the tone compared to previous seasons.

== Plot ==
On March 10, 2022, Alex (Jennifer Aniston) now hosts her variety show podcast Alex Unfiltered on UBA+. While interviewing Esther Perel, Alex is left questioned over her possible loneliness in life, just as she prepares to take part on a space flight on the Hyperion One shuttle.

Bradley (Reese Witherspoon) is now working at the evening news edition, and has ended her relationship with Laura (Julianna Margulies) after staying with her in Montana. While she wants to talk about abortionist Luna Garcia in Texas, Stella (Greta Lee) forbids her from doing so. While receiving an award from the American Alliance of Journalists, Bradley runs into Laura, and both exchange different perceptions of where their relationship went. During this, Cory (Billy Crudup) is warned by Stella and Cybil (Holland Taylor) that he must stop cutting costs across the network to invest into UBA+.

Alex, Cory, Stella and the crew of TMS arrive at Texas to meet with the owner of Hyperion, Paul Marks (Jon Hamm), who will accompany Alex and Cory on the shuttle. Paul takes Alex on a ride to show his massive property around the area, which impresses her. However, she is taken aback when he mentions a deal to buy UBA, something she was not informed. She confronts Cory, who admits that the network is going through financial turmoil and secretly went behind Cybil's back to get Paul involved. He also reveals the flight was very pivotal in securing the deal.

When Cory forbids Bradley from reporting Luna's arrest, Alex and Chip (Mark Duplass) decide to help her by abandoning their tasks and going to a protest site just hours before the liftoff. Without Alex onboard, Cory convinces Bradley to replace her in the flight, despite not preparing. As the shuttle takes off, the network broadcasts a live stream from inside the shuttle as it reaches the Kármán line. Bradley is marveled at the view and begins to describe it, when the broadcast is cut off, shocking everyone.

== Development ==
=== Production ===
The episode was written by executive producer Charlotte Stoudt, and directed by executive producer Mimi Leder. This was Stoudt's first writing credit, and Leder's eighth directing credit.

=== Writing ===
By setting a time jump to March 2022, executive producer Michael Ellenberg said, "we wanted to get far enough to see what happened with the UBA+ launch and get us on the other side of the pandemic so we're closer to where we are right now. Even though it's set a year in the past, it feels like right now. That was really our goal. We want to be tackling the noisiest, most controversial things in our culture and also give our characters a platform to see them in challenges that we hadn't seen them in before."

== Critical reviews ==
"The Kármán Line" received generally positive reviews from critics. Max Gao of The A.V. Club gave the episode a "B" grade and wrote, "It's been two years since television's most unhinged prestige drama wrapped up its messy but undeniably captivating sophomore season in the early days of the COVID-19 pandemic, leaving the fates of Alex Levy, who became seriously ill after contracting the virus, and her gaggle of UBA journalists and newsroom execs hanging in the balance. The third 10-episode season picks up two years later, on March 10, 2022, with a darkly comedic nod to how the show has repeatedly tried to kill Alex for the last two seasons."

Maggie Fremont of Vulture gave the episode a 2 star rating out of 5 and wrote, "We've seen the trailer for the season, so we know Bradley and Cory aren't going to die in some horrific space accident. Although, how absolutely Morning Show would it be to have Bradley “I'm exhausted!” Jackson go out on such an absurd note. If space hijinks are where the season starts, what other insanity does it have in store for us? Friends, we should all brace for impact." Kimberly Roots of TVLine wrote, "The Apple TV+ drama, which previously was so dedicated to realistic portrayal that it wrapped Season 2 with an excruciating play-by-play of Jennifer Aniston's Alex as she wheezed her way through COVID, seems to be done with all of that now. The show is so, so much more fun this season because of it."

Lacy Baugher of Telltale TV gave the episode a 4 star rating out of 5 and wrote, "After a truly dreadful second season, The Morning Show bounces back with a third season premiere that unapologetically leans into the series' soapiest, most ridiculous elements and finally discovers a sense of fun in the process." Carissa Pavlica of TV Fanatic gave the episode a 4.25 star rating out of 5 rating and wrote, "That's a lot to digest, and much like The Morning Show Season 2 came out swinging after COVID by including it in their story, The Morning Show Season 3 is taking on some of the biggest stories of the day, even if, for now, they're only touched upon lightly."
