= Confirmations (The Morning Show) =

- The Morning Show episode
- Episode no.: Season 2 Episode 8
- Directed by: Victoria Mahoney
- Written by: Brian Chamberlayne; Ali Vingiano
- Cinematography by: John Brawley
- Editing by: Henk Van Eeghen
- Original release date: November 5, 2021
- Running time: 56 minutes

Guest appearances
- Valeria Golino as Paola Lambruschini (special guest star); Janina Gavankar as Alison Namazi; Embeth Davidtz as Paige Kessler; Joe Tippett as Hal Jackson; Katie Aselton as Madeleine; Hannah Leder as Isabella; Victoria Tate as Rena Robinson; Tara Karsian as Gayle Berman; Markus Flanagan as Gerald Drummond; Joe Marinelli as Donny Spagnoli; Joe Pacheco as Bart Daley; Shari Belafonte as Julia; Eli Bildner as Joel Rapkin; Amber Friendly as Layla Bell; Michelle Meredith as Lindsey Sherman

Episode chronology
← Previous "La Amara Vita"	Next → "Testimony"

"Confirmations" is the eighth episode of the second season of the American drama television series The Morning Show, inspired by Brian Stelter's 2013 book Top of the Morning. It is the eighteenth overall episode of the series and was written by co-executive producer Brian Chamberlayne and Ali Vingiano, and directed by Victoria Mahoney. It was released on Apple TV+ on November 5, 2021.

The series follows the characters and culture behind a network broadcast morning news program, The Morning Show. After allegations of sexual misconduct, the male co-anchor of the program, Mitch Kessler, is forced off the show. It follows Mitch's co-host, Alex Levy, and a conservative reporter Bradley Jackson, who attracts the attention of the show's producers after a viral video. In the episode, the staff is notified about rumors over Mitch's death and work to corroborate the story, while Chip tries to locate Alex.

The episode received generally positive reviews from critics, who praised the performances, but some criticized the pacing. For the episode, Reese Witherspoon received a nomination for Outstanding Lead Actress in a Drama Series at the 74th Primetime Emmy Awards.

== Plot ==
The staff begins the show, reporting on the growth of the COVID-19 pandemic in Europe. Chip (Mark Duplass) is growing impatient with Alex's absence, leaving her an angry voicemail in her office. His behavior also begins to affect his relationship with Madeleine (Katie Aselton).

Cory (Billy Crudup) is contacted by an Italian reporter, asking for a comment on Mitch's reported death. The announcement shocks the staff, but Cory refuses to comment until they can verify the story, while Stella (Greta Lee) tries to locate Alex to report it. Upon hearing of the story, Chip gains access to Alex's financial records, finding that she was last seen in Milan. Using social media, Mia (Karen Pittman) finds the registration plates on Mitch's car, and later uses her contacts to try to find the location of the hospital that took Mitch's body.

Chip calls the hospital to corroborate Mitch's identity, specifically asking if Alex was with him, and a nurse confirms a woman was with him in bad condition. Fearing Alex died, Chip confesses to Cory and Stella that he lost contact with Alex since Las Vegas. Stella presses Isabella (Hannah Leder) to disclose Alex's location, revealing that she recently boarded a plane to Teterboro Airport. During this, Bradley (Reese Witherspoon) is visited by Hal (Joe Tippett), while Laura (Julianna Margulies) joins the conversation. When they mention Mitch's car crash, Hal once again brings up his father's drunk car crash and turns aggressive, prompting security to escort him out of the building. Laura consoles Bradley, suggesting that Hal might need to go to rehab for her sake.

Chip picks up Alex (Jennifer Aniston) at the airport, relieved that she is alive. After he states Mitch died, Alex calls Paola (Valeria Golino), who confirms his death. Alex begins to cry, and refuses to disclose the news to the media. She feels that Paige (Embeth Davidtz) needs to know in person, and calls Mia to finally confirm the story. Alex visits Paige to inform her, but Paige reveals that she knew that Alex and Mitch had an affair. She is upset with Alex's attempt to get back at her life and shuts the door. Alex subsequently gives her blessing to Mia to do the announcement without her. Deviating from their schedule, Bradley reports Mitch's death to the world.

== Development ==
=== Production ===
The episode was written by co-executive producer Brian Chamberlayne and Ali Vingiano, and directed by Victoria Mahoney. This was Chamberlayne's second writing credit, Vingiano's third writing credit, and Mahoney's first directing credit.

== Critical reviews ==
"Confirmations" received generally positive reviews from critics. Maggie Fremont of Vulture gave the episode a 3 star rating out of 5 and wrote, "Alex thinks Bradley is the one who should tell the world Mitch is dead. And also she appreciates her (??). If this season of The Morning Show is about breaking down Alex Levy, she is nearly there, folks. There cannot be much lower she can go."

Linda Holmes of NPR wrote, "Consider this The Morning Show's best plot twist yet: This is a very good episode of TV. Last week's episode was very messy, narratively and philosophically: It focused on fundamentally uninteresting characters doing uninteresting things. In the meantime, it took its eyes off anything with any complexity on the show at all. And then it came back this week, with one of its strongest episodes ever. Certainly the strongest of the season; maybe the strongest of the series?" Claire Di Maio of The Young Folks gave the episode an 8 out of 10 and wrote, "There are only two episodes left in this season of The Morning Show, and there’s a lot of potential for a truly great finish — Alex has been confronted with the consequences of her actions. There's opportunity for character growth here, and it's necessary. It took a long time — perhaps too long — to get here, but the season's not over yet. Maybe the series will be even better from here."

Lacy Baugher of Telltale TV gave the episode a 2.5 star rating out of 5 and wrote, "On paper, the idea behind “Confirmations” isn't terrible, showing us the Morning Show staff breathlessly attempting to confirm the truth of Mitch's death before announcing it on air. The problem is — none of us care if Mitch is alive and aren't exactly what you'd call upset about his death, and the many scenes featuring various people furiously making phone calls feel pointless since we all already know that he is dead and Alex is fine." Chike Coleman of We Live Entertainment gave the episode a 7 out of 10 rating and wrote, "I'm convinced that this show will continue to have something to say about Mitch Kessler until the season is over. I don't mind that as an audience member, but as a reviewer, there are other ways writers can refer to the damage he caused. I want more exploration to be done about the characters who are still here rather than the one that’s gone."

=== Awards and accolades ===
Reese Witherspoon submitted the episode to support her nomination for Outstanding Lead Actress in a Drama Series at the 74th Primetime Emmy Awards. She would lose to Zendaya for Euphoria.
