= Testimony (The Morning Show) =

- The Morning Show episode
- Episode no.: Season 2 Episode 9
- Directed by: Miguel Arteta
- Written by: Scott Troy; Justin Matthews
- Cinematography by: Jeffrey Waldron
- Editing by: Ron Rosen
- Original release date: November 12, 2021
- Running time: 58 minutes

Guest appearances
- Martin Short as Dick Lundy (special guest star); Marcia Gay Harden as Maggie Brener (special guest star); Valeria Golino as Paola Lambruschini (special guest star); Embeth Davidtz as Paige Kessler; Dave Foley as Peter Bullard; Tom Irwin as Fred Micklen; Will Arnett as Doug Klassen; Joe Tippett as Hal Jackson; Victoria Tate as Rena Robinson; Hannah Leder as Isabella; Tara Karsian as Gayle Berman; Joe Marinelli as Donny Spagnoli; Joe Pacheco as Bart Daley; Shari Belafonte as Julia; Eli Bildner as Joel Rapkin; Michelle Meredith as Lindsey Sherman; Andrea Bendewald as Valérie

Episode chronology
← Previous "Confirmations"	Next → "Fever"

"Testimony" is the ninth episode of the second season of the American drama television series The Morning Show, inspired by Brian Stelter's 2013 book Top of the Morning. It is the nineteenth overall episode of the series and was written by Scott Troy and Justin Matthews, and directed by Miguel Arteta. It was released on Apple TV+ on November 12, 2021.

The series follows the characters and culture behind a network broadcast morning news program, The Morning Show. After allegations of sexual misconduct, the male co-anchor of the program, Mitch Kessler, is forced off the show. It follows Mitch's co-host, Alex Levy, and a conservative reporter Bradley Jackson, who attracts the attention of the show's producers after a viral video. In the episode, Alex prepares to quit the show as she awaits Maggie's book, while Mitch's memorial takes place.

The episode received mixed reviews from critics, who criticized the amount of subplots and pacing. For the episode, Marcia Gay Harden received a nomination for Outstanding Guest Actress in a Drama Series at the 74th Primetime Emmy Awards.

== Plot ==
Alex (Jennifer Aniston) returns to New York, still distracted over Mitch's death. With Maggie's book set for release very soon, Alex tells Cory (Billy Crudup) that she is resigning the day prior to the launch as she fears the content of the book will ruin her image, but Cory promises he will back her up.

Paige (Embeth Davidtz) visits the staff; while she did not love Mitch anymore, she is still planning a memorial for him for the sake of her son. While she understands people hate him, she invites them all to attend. Alex hosts the show with Laura (Julianna Margulies) while Bradley (Reese Witherspoon) takes Hal (Joe Tippett) to rehab. Despite Hal's eventual regret in getting treatment, Bradley abandons him for his sake. When Alex asks Laura why she appears to take a dislike to her, Laura reveals that Alex started the rumor that she was lesbian, outing her before Laura herself had the chance. While Alex wants to move past the problem, Laura is still not ready.

Yanko (Néstor Carbonell) reunites with Claire (Bel Powley) and they catch up. As they make plans to meet again, Claire is disappointed to learn that Yanko is attending Mitch's memorial, revealing that she is helping Hannah's family with the lawsuit. At Mitch's memorial, many of Mitch's friends, including Dick Lundy (Martin Short), speak fondly of him. To everyone's surprise, Alex shows up and delivers a eulogy. She reveals she saw him in Italy on the day of his death, and that he expressed remorse for his actions, and she hopes people can remember that.

To help ease tensions, Cory arranges for Maggie (Marcia Gay Harden) to do an interview with Bradley. Bradley challenges the content in the book, especially over Maggie devoting so much of the book to Alex's affair with Mitch, as it was considered consensual. Bradley reaffirms that Alex gave her an opportunity and she should be allowed to grow from her past. The interview prompts an enormous positive support for Alex, even though Bradley admits to Laura that she believes a lot of what Maggie wrote. Laura reveals she is leaving for Montana for a few months and asks her to come with her, but Bradley turns her down. She finds that Hal returned the money to her, and has gone missing. The following day, Alex discovers that her speech at Mitch's memorial has leaked and the people has turned against her, especially as she might have exposed people to COVID-19 from her visit in Italy. A distraught Alex trips and bumps her head, and she wakes up at the hospital. She is called by Doug (Will Arnett), who reveals that she tested positive for COVID-19.

== Development ==
=== Production ===
The episode was written by Scott Troy and Justin Matthews, and directed by Miguel Arteta. This was Troy's third writing credit, Matthews' first writing credit, and Arteta's first directing credit.

=== Writing ===
On Laura's break-up with Bradley, Julianna Margulies said, "I don't think Laura thought the relationship with Bradley was going to go much further after [their first kiss]. That it does is a bonus. But I think, as it goes further, it becomes much more intellectually intimate because Bradley starts to show all her wounds. She's a wounded animal, and I think Laura is very good at licking those wounds because she is a caretaker. But she's also very good at knowing boundaries. So it's a really gentle sort of dance that she does with Bradley."

== Critical reviews ==
"Testimony" received mixed reviews from critics. Maggie Fremont of Vulture gave the episode a 2 star rating out of 5 and wrote, "Wow, okay, this show is so messy. That's not news or anything, but it just felt so apparent in this episode, which included all of the following: Alex's return (again) to TMS, a trip to rehab gone wrong, a head injury, a lengthy hand-washing segment, Cory Ellison on late night TV I guess, Alex getting cancelled, Alex getting Covid, a nightmarish memorial service, Bradley skewering Maggie Brener in an interview, Claire is back for some reason?, and Jennifer Aniston and Julianna Marguiles both saying the words Bring in ‘da Noise, Bring in ‘da Funk to each other, among other things!! Sure, that last one on the list is a true blessing for us all but come on, this episode is doing too much. This episode needs to relax."

Linda Holmes of NPR wrote, "After a couple of weeks when we seesawed from a very bad episode to a very good episode, now we're comfortably back in the middle, where some things work and other things seem like they were written on Mars." Claire Di Maio of The Young Folks gave the episode a 5 out of 10 and wrote, "COVID-19 has only waltzed into The Morning Show when it feels relevant — this episode ends with a shot of a hospital overwhelmed with patients — and it only has one episode left this season to really justify its season-long wait to get to this point. But The Morning Show has had some surprisingly great episodes before, so maybe the wait will be worth it. Here's hoping."

Lacy Baugher of Telltale TV gave the episode a 2.5 star rating out of 5 and wrote, "The Morning Show Season 2 Episode 9, “Testimony,” is the penultimate installment of the season and, if anything, serves as absolute confirmation that the show has absolutely no idea what it's doing right now. It is an entire mess, and I truly hate that for all of us, but there it is." Chike Coleman of We Live Entertainment gave the episode a 6 out of 10 rating and wrote, "This was a fantastic episode with one major problem. Everything that happens in this episode came far too late in the season. You could have had Alex's breakdown occur much earlier in the season, and her realization that she needed to admit to her own part in toxic behavior could have fueled her redemption later on in the season. Ultimately for audiences, this entire season is a complete waste because only now in the show's penultimate episode are we getting any form of redemption from a character that has been chaotic, toxic, demeaning, and cruel. Honestly, sitting through the other eight episodes feels worthless because Alex had only started facing her inner demons."

=== Awards and accolades ===
For the episode, Marcia Gay Harden received a nomination for Outstanding Guest Actress in a Drama Series at the 74th Primetime Emmy Awards. She would lose to Lee Yoo-mi for Squid Game.
