= The Revolution Will Not Be Televised (disambiguation) =

"The Revolution Will Not Be Televised" is a poem and song by Gil Scott-Heron.

The Revolution Will Not Be Televised may also refer to:

- The Revolution Will Not Be Televised (album), a 1974 compilation album by Gil Scott-Heron
- The Revolution Will Not Be Televised (film), a television documentary film about Hugo Chávez during the Venezuelan coup attempt of 2002
- The Revolution Will Not Be Televised (book), a book by Joe Trippi about Howard Dean's 2004 presidential campaign

== See also ==
- The Revolution Will Be Televised, a BBC television show
- The Revolution Will Be Televised (The Morning Show)
- Summer of Soul (...Or, When the Revolution Could Not Be Televised), a 2021 American documentary film directed by Ahmir "Questlove" Thompson
