= Tipping Point (The Morning Show) =

- The Morning Show episode
- Episode no.: Season 4 Episode 3
- Directed by: Stacie Passon
- Written by: Jiehae Park
- Cinematography by: John Grillo
- Editing by: Sidney Wolinsky
- Original release date: October 1, 2025
- Running time: 47 minutes

Guest appearances
- Bel Powley as Claire Conway (special guest star); Aaron Pierre as Miles; Sara Bareilles as Herself; Stephanie Sigman as Ava Carillo; Richard Burgi as Zeke Pemberton; Kathe Mazur as Bethanne Hines; Maria Canals-Barrera as Mercedes; Amber Friendly as Layla Bell; Victoria Tate as Rena Robinson; Andrea Bendewald as Valérie; Wesam Keesh as Jamal

Episode chronology
← Previous "The Revolution Will Be Televised"	Next → "Love the Questions"

"Tipping Point" is the third episode of the fourth season of the American drama television series The Morning Show, inspired by Brian Stelter's 2013 book Top of the Morning. It is the 33rd overall episode of the series and was written by Jiehae Park, and directed by Stacie Passon. It was released on Apple TV+ on October 1, 2025.

In the episode, Bradley and Chip meet with Bradley's source, while Alex is asked to fix a PR problem with an oil businessman.

The episode received positive reviews from critics, who praised the scenes between Cory and Bradley and Claire's return, but some criticized its pacing.

== Plot ==
Bradley and Chip meet with Claire, who confirms she is Bradley's source. While initially dismissive, she tells them that former head of news Bethanne Hines took a payout to kill the Wolf River story. Later, Chip meets with Bethanne, and while she cannot disclose anything, she agrees to keep in touch with him, surreptitiously leaving Chip some info about the story on his phone.

Alex is informed that Zeke Pemberton, an oil businessman, has pulled his advertising on UBN after her appearance at the climate summit. Celine and Stella force her to attend a conference to personally apologize to Pemberton, but she runs into Paul Marks at the event. Alex becomes upset after discovering that Paul has a new girlfriend, and he consoles her. He personally convinces Pemberton to return to UBN without having Alex intervene, much to her surprise.

Cory invites Bradley to his house, telling her he is returning to UBN. As they talk, Bradley surprises by kissing him, and they end up having sex. Forced to accommodate Cory's overall deal, Stella decides to assign Ben as Head of News. This upsets Mia, who interviewed for the position after desiring it for years. She personally visits Stella to discuss the matter, and Stella claims she lacks focus and vision. Unwilling to accept this, Mia renounces Stella's friendship and quits.

== Development ==
=== Production ===
The episode was written by Jiehae Park, and directed by Stacie Passon. This was Park's first writing credit, and Passon's third directing credit.

=== Writing ===
The episode featured Cory and Bradley kissing and having sex. Billy Crudup admitted surprise when he was handed the script, remarking "it hasn't really been a feasible option for either of them. Once they set up a scenario where he was no longer her boss, and they might encounter each other in a non-work related environment, I suppose the writers and everybody else was curious to see how far it would go." Reese Witherspoon added, "Bradley's really, behind the scenes, taking advantage of him. I think it's so interesting, too, their dynamic. I can't even make heads or tails of it sometimes, why they're so enmeshed. And they kind of antagonize each other."

Charlotte Stoudt revealed that Claire was supposed to return in the third season, but Powley's schedule and story logics prevented it. Upon writing the fourth season, it was clear that they could bring her back, "As we were in the room for Season 4, we were noticing all these protest actions by Extinction Rebellion stopping the Broadway show in the middle, throwing paint onto things, blocking traffic in London. I always felt Claire had a real zeal, a rebellious, revolutionary energy."

== Critical reviews ==
"Tipping Point" received positive reviews from critics. Maggie Fremont of Vulture gave the episode a 3 star rating out of 5 and wrote, "It's honestly a shame that they decided to pull the trigger on this storyline in the same episode in which Alex and Paul reunite, since Jennifer Aniston and Jon Hamm merely look at each other and ooze sexual tension and onscreen chemistry. The lack of those two things between Billy Crudup and Reese Witherspoon becomes glaringly obvious. Although who knows? Maybe they'll have time to change our minds."

Kimberly Roots of TVLine wrote, "What we know, though, and Cory doesn't: After talking with Claire, Bradley suspects that Cory knows something about UBA's cover-up of the environmental incident. So the romantic overture? Maybe not so romantic." Lacy Baugher of Telltale TV gave the episode a 4.5 star rating out of 5 and wrote, "Whether that will be in a good way or a bad one remains to be seen. And the same can probably be said for how viewers will likely feel about what went down here."

Michel Ghanem of Elle wrote, "I suppose it was only inevitable for this to happen. At least they're both single! I can't handle more than one weaponized affair on this show." Denis Kimathi of TV Fanatic gave the episode a 4.5 star rating out of 5 and wrote, "“A Tipping Point” does not feel like an actual tipping point. The episode feels like the last stretch before the tipping point. However, it's a crucial stretch because without it, we won’t reach the tipping point."

=== Accolades ===
TVLine named Karen Pittman the "Performer of the Week" for the week of October 4, 2025, for her performance in the episode. The site wrote, "Alas, the position eventually went to someone less experienced, which gave Pittman her best scene of the hour. She took Mia on a journey in just a few moments, choking back tears of bitter anger and betrayal as she reminded Stella that it was her idea to go out for the job in the first place. But we have never loved Mia more than when Pittman pulled her together yet again and, without wavering, informed the CEO that she quit — a baller move, pulled off in triumphant fashion by an actress at the top of her craft."
