= If Then (The Morning Show) =

- The Morning Show episode
- Episode no.: Season 4 Episode 6
- Directed by: Millicent Shelton
- Written by: Zander Lehmann
- Cinematography by: Tobias Datum
- Editing by: Blake Maniquis
- Original release date: October 22, 2025
- Running time: 55 minutes

Guest appearances
- Boyd Holbrook as Brodie; Aaron Pierre as Miles; Lindsay Duncan as Martha; Alano Miller as Marcus Hunter; Rushi Kota as Kabir; Kara Swisher as Herself; Theo Iyer as Kyle; Amber Friendly as Layla Bell; Shari Belafonte as Julia; Victoria Tate as Rena Robinson

Episode chronology
| ← Previous "Amari" | Next → "Person of Interest" |

"If Then" is the sixth episode of the fourth season of the American drama television series The Morning Show, inspired by Brian Stelter's 2013 book Top of the Morning. It is the 36th overall episode of the series and was written by executive producer Zander Lehmann, and directed by Millicent Shelton. It was released on Apple TV+ on October 22, 2025.

The show examines the characters and culture behind a network broadcast morning news program. In the episode, Stella considers a new life with Miles, while Alex is forced to get Brodie to co-host their upcoming AI program unveiling event. Meanwhile, Cory and Bradley find a new lead in the Wolf River story.

The episode received generally positive reviews from critics, with high praise towards Greta Lee's performance in the episode.

== Plot ==
Celine pushes Stella to unveil UBN's AI program early, even though it is unfinished. Christine backs out of co-hosting the unveiling event when Stella refuses to give her a better contract, leading Stella to suggest that Alex ask Brodie to co-host. Alex meets Brodie for drinks to discuss the offer, revealing that he will only accept it if he can host the presidential debate.

Worried about her future at the network, Stella confides in Miles that she wants to leave her life and go to Naples with him, but he is unsure about starting over, leading to an argument. Stella confides to her personal AI chatbot, contemplating her legacy at UBN and revealing her insecurities about being CEO. Meanwhile, Bradley and Chip identify an associate of Kenneth Stockton as Sophia Volk, the former quality control manager at Martel Chemical Plant; Bradley contacts Sophia for more information. Cory, investigating the Wolf River cover-up himself, learns from his mother that Celine's family paid Fred to kill the Wolf River story. He confronts Celine over the discovery, but she is unaffected, intimidating him into staying silent.

Celine and Stella decide not to respect Brodie's terms, and plan to pull him from the debate after he finishes the unveiling event. Upon finding out, Brodie backs out at the last minute, leading Stella and Celine to host the event themselves. The AI program is received positively by the audience, but everything goes awry when Stella's AI chatbot reveals her personal thoughts, including her affair with Miles. Humiliated, Stella leaves and visits Miles, who finally agrees to go to Naples with her. The following morning, Alex announces Stella's resignation live on TMS, and that Celine has been appointed as interim CEO.

Before leaving for Naples, Stella leaves a letter for Mia containing a flash drive; she commends Mia for her resilience and encourages her to leverage the upcoming "power void" at UBN. As Miles prepares to meet Stella at the airport, he is visited by Celine, who states that she gave everything up for him and that despite their problems, she will always love him. After hesitating, Miles chooses to stay with Celine. Devastated, Stella breaks down in tears and boards her plane alone.

== Development ==
=== Production ===
The episode was written by executive producer Zander Lehmann, and directed by Millicent Shelton. This was Lehmann's third writing credit, and Shelton's third directing credit.

=== Writing ===
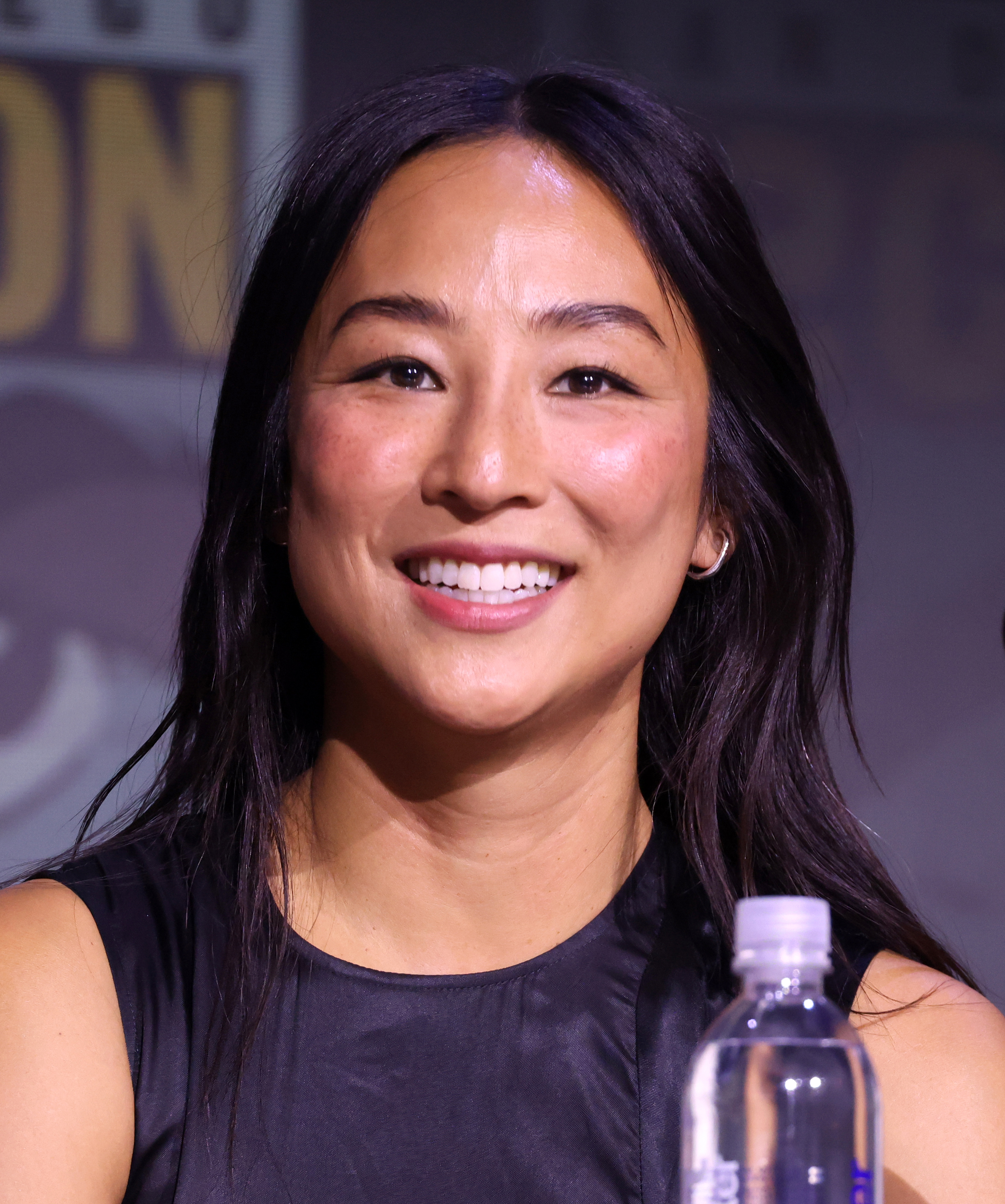
The episode was Greta Lee's final appearance as a main cast member.

The episode marked Greta Lee's final appearance as a main cast member in the series. Charlotte Stoudt explained "It was very hard to leave her, even though it was time for Stella to go rediscover some part of herself, and she couldn't do that at UBN. She had to get on that plane by herself. When you really are at a crossroads, people can support you, but you can't have a buddy. You have to figure it out by yourself." She also added, "I think Stella's quite divided. She knows what being in that chair means. She knows she's a role model. It's an incredible career move. But I think she's uncomfortable. I don't think it suits her. And she's having to make choices that are really difficult. And she's like, ‘Is this where I belong?’ And the answer might be no."

Lee further commented, "It's all of the centrifugal force that's been piling up after years and years of having to operate a certain way. She has gotten quite savvy since the day she first arrived, but I think that it's clear — or it was clear to me — that it's not sustainable." She added, "Seeing how this all ends for her... It was so sad and upsetting and shocking. But it's one of those things where I feel like she is at peace, and I don't think there’s any other alternative. This is what had to happen, and I'm so glad that, in the end, she's liberated."

== Critical reviews ==
"If Then" received generally positive reviews from critics. Maggie Fremont of Vulture gave the episode a 3 star rating out of 5 and wrote, "The moment The Morning Show introduced AI in the season premiere, you knew it was going to blow up in someone's face. I just did not ever think it would blow up this spectacularly."

Michel Ghanem of Elle wrote, "Greta Lee turns in a stunning performance this week as Stella claws herself out of the calcified cocoon of suppression she has accumulated over her time at UBN." Denis Kimathi of TV Fanatic gave the episode a 4.7 star rating out of 5 and wrote, "'If Then' continues to lay the groundwork for an intense season as we bridge the gap to the season finale. With Stella out, there is a lot to be done to mitigate the consequences and get UBN back on track. Will it succeed?"
