= The Morning Show (American TV series) =

American drama television series

- Also known as: Morning Wars
- Genre: Comedy-drama; Satire; Tragicomedy
- Created by: Jay Carson
- Inspired by: Top of the Morning by Brian Stelter
- Developed by: Kerry Ehrin
- Showrunners: Kerry Ehrin; Charlotte Stoudt
- Starring: Jennifer Aniston; Reese Witherspoon; Billy Crudup; Mark Duplass; Gugu Mbatha-Raw; Néstor Carbonell; Karen Pittman; Bel Powley; Desean Terry; Jack Davenport; Steve Carell; Greta Lee; Ruairi O'Connor; Julianna Margulies; Nicole Beharie; Jon Hamm; Marion Cotillard
- Music by: Carter Burwell
- Opening theme: "Nemesis" by Benjamin Clementine
- Country of origin: United States
- Original language: English
- No. of seasons: 4
- No. of episodes: 40

Production
- Executive producers: Jennifer Aniston; Reese Witherspoon; Kerry Ehrin; Michael Ellenberg; Mimi Leder; Kristin Hahn; Lauren Levy Neustadter
- Cinematography: Michael Grady; David Lanzenberg; John Brawley; Jeffrey Waldron; John Grillo; Tami Reiker
- Camera setup: Single-camera
- Running time: 46–69 minutes
- Production companies: Echo Films; Hello Sunshine; Kerry Ehrin Productions (season 1); Media Res; Bad Attitude (season 2); Red Shoes Pictures (season 3–present); Yak Yak Pictures (season 4–present)

Original release
- Network: Apple TV+
- Release: November 1, 2019 – October 8, 2025
- Network: Apple TV
- Release: October 15, 2025 – present

The Morning Show (Note: Known as Morning Wars in Australia and Indonesia) is an American comedy-drama television series starring Jennifer Aniston, Reese Witherspoon, and Billy Crudup. The series premiered on Apple TV+ on November 1, 2019. The series is inspired by Brian Stelter's 2013 book Top of the Morning. The show examines the characters and culture behind a network broadcast morning news program. After allegations of sexual misconduct, the male co-anchor of the program is forced off the show. Aspects of the #MeToo movement are examined from multiple perspectives as more information comes out regarding the misconduct. Subsequent seasons focus on other political topics and current events, including the COVID-19 pandemic, racial inequality, the Capitol insurrection, and the Russian invasion of Ukraine.

The second season premiered on September 17, 2021. In January 2022, the series was renewed for a third season, which premiered on September 13, 2023. In May 2023, ahead of the premiere of the third season, the series was renewed for a fourth season, which premiered on September 17, 2025. In September 2025, ahead of the premiere of the fourth season, the series was renewed for a fifth season, later confirmed to be its last.

The series has received numerous accolades, including 28 Primetime Emmy Award nominations, 11 Screen Actors Guild Award nominations and ten Golden Globe Award nominations. Jennifer Aniston, Reese Witherspoon and Billy Crudup have all received particular acclaim for their performances, with Aniston and Witherspoon each earning two nominations for the Primetime Emmy Award for Outstanding Lead Actress in a Drama Series and Aniston winning the Screen Actors Guild Award for Outstanding Performance by a Female Actor in a Drama Series in 2020, and Crudup winning the Primetime Emmy Award for Outstanding Supporting Actor in a Drama Series in 2020 and 2024.

== Premise ==
Alex Levy co-anchors The Morning Show (TMS), a popular morning news program broadcast from Manhattan on the UBA network, which has excellent viewership ratings and is perceived to have changed the face of American television.

In the first season, after her on-air partner of 15 years, Mitch Kessler, is fired amid a sexual misconduct scandal, Alex fights to retain her job as a top news anchor while paired with a new partner, Bradley Jackson, a field reporter whose series of impulsive decisions increasingly threatens the network.

In the second season, the network CEO attempts to convince Alex to return to TMS as the COVID-19 pandemic engulfs the United States and the show itself. Meanwhile, Bradley deals with an identity crisis.

In the third season, the network struggles for viewers for its subscription service and contemplates a takeover by tech titan Paul Marks.

In the fourth season, the newly merged UBN attempts to further its ambitions, while Bradley investigates a cover-up at the hands of the former UBA.

== Cast and characters ==
Cast overview for The Morning Show
Actor	Character	Seasons			
Actor	Character	Season 1	Season 2	Season 3	Season 4
Jennifer Aniston	Alexandra "Alex" Levy	Main	Main	Main	Main
Reese Witherspoon	Bradley Jackson	Main	Main	Main	Main
Billy Crudup	Cory Ellison	Main	Main	Main	Main
Mark Duplass	Charlie "Chip" Black	Main	Main	Main	Main
Gugu Mbatha-Raw	Hannah Shoenfeld	Main			
Néstor Carbonell	Yanko Flores	Main	Main	Main	Recurring
Karen Pittman	Mia Jordan	Main	Main	Main	Main
Bel Powley	Claire Conway	Main (Note: In season 2, Powley only appears in one episode, although credited with the main cast.)	Main		Main (Note: In season 4, Powley is credited as a special guest star in the third episode and then with the main cast in the seventh episode.)
Desean Terry	Daniel Henderson	Main	Main		
Jack Davenport	Jason Craig	Main			
Steve Carell	Mitch Kessler	Main	Main		
Greta Lee	Stella Bak		Main	Main	Main
Ruairi O'Connor	Ty Fitzgerald		Main		
Julianna Margulies	Laura Peterson		Main	Main	
Nicole Beharie	Christine Hunter			Main	Main
Jon Hamm	Paul Marks			Main	Main
Marion Cotillard	Celine Dumont				Main

=== Main ===
- Jennifer Aniston as Alexandra "Alex" Levy, co-host of UBA's TMS
- Reese Witherspoon as Bradley Jackson, former TMS co-host and news anchor at UBA
- Billy Crudup as Cory Ellison, CEO of UBA
- Mark Duplass as Charlie "Chip" Black, executive producer of TMS
- Gugu Mbatha-Raw as Hannah Shoenfeld (season 1), talent booker for TMS
- Néstor Carbonell as Yanko Flores (seasons 1–3; recurring season 4), the meteorologist of TMS
- Karen Pittman as Mia Jordan, a producer at TMS
- Bel Powley as Claire Conway (seasons 1–2, 4), a production assistant at TMS and Yanko's love interest
- Desean Terry as Daniel Henderson (seasons 1–2), co-host of the weekend edition of TMS
- Jack Davenport as Jason Craig (season 1), Alex's ex-husband
- Steve Carell as Mitch Kessler (seasons 1–2), the recently fired co-host of The Morning Show
- Greta Lee as Stella Bak (seasons 2–4), (Note: In season 4, Lee is only credited as a series regular in the episodes she appears in. In all other episodes, she is not credited and does not appear.) President of UBA's news division
- Ruairi O'Connor as Ty Fitzgerald (season 2), social media expert at UBA
- Julianna Margulies as Laura Peterson (seasons 2–3), YDA co-host and former news anchor at UBA who develops a romance with Bradley
- Nicole Beharie as Christine Hunter (season 3–present), a former Olympian and new TMS co-host
- Jon Hamm as Paul Marks (seasons 3–4), (Note: In season 4, Hamm is only credited as a series regular in the episodes he appears in. In all other episodes, he is not credited and does not appear.) a tech billionaire who attempts to buy UBA
- Marion Cotillard as Celine Dumont (season 4), (Note: In season 4, Cotillard is only credited as a series regular in the episodes she appears in. In all other episodes, she is not credited and does not appear.) a savvy operator from a storied European family

=== Recurring ===
- Shari Belafonte as Julia, floor manager at UBA
- Victoria Tate as Rena Robinson, Chip's assistant
- Hannah Leder as Isabella
- Joe Marinelli as Donny Spagnoli
- Eli Bildner as Joel Rapkin
- Amber Friendly as Layla Bell
- Joe Pacheco as Bart Daley
- Tom Irwin as Fred Micklen (seasons 1–2; guest season 3), UBA's president
- Janina Gavankar as Alison Namazi (seasons 1–2), co-host of the weekend edition of TMS
- Joe Tippett as Hal Jackson, Bradley's brother
- Michelle Meredith as Lindsey Sherman (seasons 1–2)
- Andrea Bendewald as Valérie (season 1; guest seasons 2–4)
- Marcia Gay Harden as Maggie Brener (season 1; guest seasons 2–3), a reporter and journalist
- Augustus Prew as Sean (season 1; guest season 2)
- Katherine Ko as Dhillon Reece-Smit (season 1)
- Ian Gomez as Greg (season 1)
- Oona Roche as Lizzy Craig (season 1; guest season 2), Alex and Jason's daughter
- David Magidoff as Nicky Brooks (season 1)
- Kate Vernon as Geneva Micklen (season 1)
- Roman Mitichyan as Sam Rudo (season 1)
- Theo Iyer as Kyle (seasons 2–4), Cory's assistant
- Choni Francis as RJ Smith (seasons 2–3)
- Tara Karsian as Gayle Berman (seasons 2–3)
- Holland Taylor as Cybil Reynolds (seasons 2–3), a seasoned board member of UBA
- Valeria Golino as Paola Lambruschini (season 2), a documentarian who befriends Mitch in Italy
- Aflamu Johnson as Aflamu (season 2; guest seasons 3–4)
- Markus Flanagan as Gerald Drummond (season 2; guest seasons 1, 3)
- Hasan Minhaj as Eric Nomani (season 2), Bradley's new co-host
- Patrick Bristow as Gordon (season 2)
- Katie Aselton as Madeleine (season 2), Chip's girlfriend
- Jack Conley as Earl (season 3; guest season 2)
- Tig Notaro as Amanda Robinson (season 3; guest season 4)
- Stephen Fry as Leonard Cromwell (season 3)
- Clive Standen as Andre Ford (season 3; guest season 4)
- Natalie Morales as Kate Danton (season 3)
- Jeremy Irons as Martin Levy (season 4), Alex's father
- Boyd Holbrook as Brodie "Bro" Hartman (season 4), a popular and provocative podcaster and talk show host
- Aaron Pierre as Miles (season 4), Celine's husband who has a romantic past with Stella.
- William Jackson Harper as Ben (season 4), the network's self-assured and innovative Head of Sports
- Alano Miller as Marcus Hunter (season 4; guest season 3), Christine's husband
- Rachel Marsh as Remy (season 4), Alex's assistant
- Violett Beane as Sunny Stuber (season 4), Brodie's co-host

=== Guest ===
- Mindy Kaling as Audra Khatri (seasons 1–3), a rival morning news anchor
- Embeth Davidtz as Paige Kessler (seasons 1–2), Mitch's ex-wife
- Mark Harelik as Richard (seasons 1–2)
- Will Arnett as Doug Klassen (seasons 2–4)
- Martin Short as Dick Lundry (seasons 1–2), a disgraced movie director
- Meredith Scott Lynn as Linda (seasons 2–3)
- Maria Canals-Barrera as Mercedes (seasons 3–4), a UBA board member
- June Diane Raphael as Ashley Andrews (seasons 3–4), an anchor for Eagle News
- Lindsay Duncan as Martha (seasons 3–4), Cory's mother

==== Season 1 ====
- Adina Porter as Sarah Gravele
- Brett Butler as Sandy Jackson
- Philip Anthony-Rodriguez as Gabriel
- Fred Melamed as Neal Altman
- Ahna O'Reilly as Ashley Brown
- Natalia Warner as Cecily
- Andrew Leeds as Alan
- John Marshall Jones as Noah
- Zuri Hall as herself
- Kelly Clarkson as herself
- Kelly Sullivan as Vicki Manderly
- David Morse as Mr. Jackson
- Julian Morris as Andrew
- Cheyenne Jackson as himself
- Robert Cicchini as Robert
- Mike O'Malley as Tim Eavers
- Romy Rosemont as Sheila Lutkin
- Brian Bowen Smith as photographer
- Paul Guilfoyle as Reid
- Ethan Cohn as Jared
- Dana Davis as Christine
- Maria Sharapova as herself
- Hayes MacArthur as Marlon Tate

==== Season 2 ====
- Dave Foley as Peter Bullard
- Kathy Najimy as Sylvia Portman
- James Urbaniak as Backstage Manager
- David Bowe as Clyde Canter
- Patrick Fabian as Jeff
- Foo Fighters as Themselves
- David Paymer as Mr. Shoenfeld
- Brian Stelter as Carl Richardson

==== Season 3 ====
- Ilia Volok as Pavlo
- Andrew Patrick Ralston as Elmer
- Esther Perel as Herself
- Retta as Herself
- Fortune Feimster as Herself
- Brent Bailey as Zach
- Sasha Alexander as Salma
- T.V. Carpio as Emma
- Daniel Kash as Seth
- Samantha Sloyan as Cheryl
- Eyal Podell as Larry Pane
- Shannon Woodward as Jess Bennett
- Elizabeth Perkins as Elena Daniels
- Joanne Baron as Brenda Litchfield

==== Season 4 ====
- John Hoogenakker as Andy Montgomery
- Haaz Sleiman as Mehdi Ali
- Wesam Keesh as Jamal
- Will Speck as Himself
- Kenneth Choi as John
- Sara Bareilles as Herself
- Stephanie Sigman as Ava Carillo
- Merrin Dungey as Joy Taylor
- Ashley Romans as Tunde
- Arnaud Valois as Arnaud Dumont
- Lauren Lapkus as Emma
- Costa Ronin as Dmitry Ivanov

== Episodes ==
Season	Episodes	Originally released		
Season	Episodes	First released	Last released	Network
1	10	November 1, 2019	December 20, 2019	Apple TV+
2	10	September 17, 2021	November 19, 2021	Apple TV+
3	10	September 13, 2023	November 8, 2023	Apple TV+
4	10	September 17, 2025	November 19, 2025	Apple TV+

=== Season 1 (2019) ===
No. overall	No. in season	Title	Directed by	Written by	Original release date
1	1	"In the Dark Night of the Soul It's Always 3:30 in the Morning"	Mimi Leder	Kerry Ehrin and Jay Carson	November 1, 2019
2	2	"A Seat at the Table"	Mimi Leder	Teleplay by : Kerry Ehrin; Story by : Kerry Ehrin and Jay Carson	November 1, 2019
3	3	"Chaos Is the New Cocaine"	David Frankel	Erica Lipez	November 1, 2019
4	4	"That Woman"	Lynn Shelton	Adam Milch	November 8, 2019
5	5	"No One's Gonna Harm You, Not While I'm Around"	David Frankel	Torrey Speer	November 15, 2019
6	6	"The Pendulum Swings"	Tucker Gates	Kristen Layden	November 22, 2019
7	7	"Open Waters"	Roxann Dawson	Jeff Augustin	November 29, 2019
8	8	"Lonely at the Top"	Michelle MacLaren	JC Lee	December 6, 2019
9	9	"Play the Queen"	Kevin Bray	Erica Lipez & Ali Vingiano	December 13, 2019
10	10	"The Interview"	Mimi Leder	Kerry Ehrin	December 20, 2019

=== Season 2 (2021) ===
No. overall	No. in season	Title	Directed by	Written by	Original release date
11	1	"My Least Favorite Year"	Mimi Leder	Erica Lipez & Adam Milch and Kerry Ehrin	September 17, 2021
12	2	"It's Like the Flu"	Mimi Leder	Torrey Speer & Kristen Layden	September 24, 2021
13	3	"Laura"	Lesli Linka Glatter	Brian Chamberlayne & Jeff Augustin	October 1, 2021
14	4	"Kill the Fatted Calf"	Jessica Yu	Ali Vingiano & Scott Troy	October 8, 2021
15	5	"Ghosts"	Tucker Gates	Erica Lipez & Adam Milch	October 15, 2021
16	6	"A Private Person"	Rachel Morrison	Torrey Speer & Stacy Osei-Kuffour	October 22, 2021
17	7	"La Amara Vita"	Mimi Leder	Kerry Ehrin & Scott Troy	October 29, 2021
18	8	"Confirmations"	Victoria Mahoney	Brian Chamberlayne & Ali Vingiano	November 5, 2021
19	9	"Testimony"	Miguel Arteta	Scott Troy & Justin Matthews	November 12, 2021
20	10	"Fever"	Mimi Leder	Kerry Ehrin	November 19, 2021

=== Season 3 (2023) ===
No. overall	No. in season	Title	Directed by	Written by	Original release date
21	1	"The Kármán Line"	Mimi Leder	Charlotte Stoudt	September 13, 2023
In the two years following the pandemic's tipping point, Bradley has ended her relationship with Laura and received a coveted spot in the evening news, while Alex has remained as TMS host with Yanko and their new co-host Christine Hunter. During an interview with psychologist Esther Perel, a staggering question brings feelings of loneliness to Alex. Cory remains as UBA's lead and cuts costs from all its divisions for the sake of keeping UBA+ afloat, seeing backlash from UBA's ruthless board chairman Cybil. Meanwhile, Alex prepares for a space flight in a rocket belonging to billionaire Paul Marks. During a private conversation with Alex, Paul reveals he and Cory had been secretly finalizing the deal to integrate UBA into his corporation and that the flight was crucial to make it happen. Bradley struggles to put through an unauthorized report on the arrest of abortionist Luna Garcia; Alex and Chip help Bradley by covering Luna's detention without notice hours before the liftoff. A desperate Cory approaches Bradley and persuades her to replace Alex in the spaceship. She passes an express training and is launched into space alongside Cory and Paul. As the shuttle nears the Kármán line, the connection with Earth disrupts.
22	2	"Ghost in the Machine"	Mimi Leder	Michelle Denise Jackson	September 13, 2023
After a brief pause, the spaceship's connection restores and it lands on Earth safely. Alex and Chip also return after their arbitrary leave, and they fly back to New York with Bradley and the rest of the crew. Luna is released from custody and is free of charges, but wants to stay away from UBA. Alex passes the news of the deal between Cory and Paul to Bradley and Cybil so they could hatch a plan to frustrate it together. UBA falls under a massive cyberattack and is taken off air. The hackers request $50 million ransom so the extracted confidential information of the employees will not spill further on the internet. The board led by Cybil vote not to proceed with the payout, and Bradley warns that compromising information may arise. UBA hires tech analysts to close the breach and investigate into the impact of the hack. They determine that all media on all devices connected to the network, bringing various inside conflicts and private relationships to light. Meanwhile, Alex accidentally finds out that Chip and her assistant Isabella have been dating for a year, which causes an acute depression.
23	3	"White Noise"	Thomas Carter	Joshua Allen	September 20, 2023
UBA faces backlash from their rivals as the hacked private information begins to leak. Cybil's e-mail referring to Christine as Aunt Jemima and salary detraction from non-white staff members spark racist allegations across the board. Christine is severely offended by Cybil's remark and wants to have an interview with her on TMS to address it. The meeting with staff members fails when Yanko criticizes the racial views of some of his colleagues. Cory agrees to Paul's initial offer and tries to push it through at the board, but Cybil refuses. During her interview, a furious Christine presses Cybil over her remarks, and Cybil suddenly declares that Christine should be grateful for getting the co-host position. Her reputation undermined, Cybil is exiled from her position by a no confidence vote and Leonard Cromwell is appointed as the new board chairman. Cory visits Paul at a private event to ratify his deal, but Paul declines the offer and claims that UBA has become an excessively toxic network, leaving Cory and the collapsing UBA on their own.
24	4	"The Green Light"	Tucker Gates	Kimi Howl Lee	September 27, 2023
As the networks have their annual advertising buy parties, representatives from the lender inform Cory that since Q1 revenue is down 23% year to date and 48% of the revenue comes from advertising, UBA must match the previous year's ad buy or they will not underwrite the loan. Stella successfully wines and dines clients in a fancy restaurant to secure a $200,000 per spot ad buy. Alex takes Paul to a Coney Island amusement park and apologizes for bailing on the suborbital flight. Cory has an upfront party at his mansion with many of the UBA personalities to help sell the brand to the advertisers in attendance. Fred informs Cory that every fiscal decision must go through him as he is overseeing the loan as a consultant. Unwilling to work with Fred, Cory informs Stella that he is going to secure the funding from another source; Alex and Paul then arrive at the party in a helicopter. Mia's boyfriend Andre travels within Ukraine to cover a hospital bombing and provides photos of the scene to Mia, but asks her not to release them until he confirms he is safe. Mia agrees, but later releases the photos anyway to ensure UBA's exclusive.
25	5	"Love Island"	Stacie Passon	Zander Lehmann	October 4, 2023
In a flashback to 2020 at the beginning of the pandemic, Bradley moves in with Laura to co-host the show remotely, and learns of her mother's death from Hal. Laura and Bradley's relationship deteriorates over time, and Bradley decides to move out after getting into a heated argument with Laura about Bradley's mother. Meanwhile, Cory purchases a mansion and meets his neighbor Paul Marks on the beach. While working on obtaining programming for UBA+, Cory convinces Stella to air the documentary with Mitch's last interview; Andre watches the documentary and is stunned when Mia reveals the extent of her past relationship with Mitch. After Mia fights with him for ignoring COVID protocols, Andre takes an assignment in Afghanistan. That winter in January 2021, Bradley captures video of the events inside the Capitol, only to discover that Hal is one of the people struggling with the police. Later that day, Hal informs Bradley that his girlfriend is pregnant; Bradley deletes the footage to allow Hal to get back to his life, and she shows Stella her other videos, which lands her the job on the evening news. When the FBI requests all of Bradley's video footage, Bradley tells Cory that she had to delete one video because Hal was in it. Cory only provides the FBI with the edited video footage aired on the network to avoid a scandal.
26	6	"The Stanford Student"	Mimi Leder	Micah Schraft	October 11, 2023
The merger between Hyperion and UBA is back on the table and a Q&A session ends badly when Alex asks Paul to comment on a rumor regarding his company's surveillance software. Meanwhile, Hal visits Bradley and introduces her to his wife and daughter. He tells Bradley that he is going to turn himself in and she is unsuccessful at deterring him. She freezes during a broadcast, remembering the scene with Hal at the Capitol, but composes herself quickly to plug the next segment. Laura senses Bradley's anxiety while having a drink with her, so she visits Hal and expresses her desire to be in a relationship with Bradley; Hal ultimately decides not to turn himself in and returns home with his family. Elsewhere, Alex interviews Paul at his house for her show and asks a question about a business deal in the past between Paul and a former Stanford student, which prompts him to tell a story about how his ex-wife left him. Alex spends the night at Paul's house and they have sex. Chip proposes to Isabella, but she declines because she thinks he has feelings for Alex. Paul meets with Stella, the Stanford student, and informs her that when the merger is completed, Cory will be fired and she will be the new CEO.
27	7	"Strict Scrutiny"	Jennifer Getzinger	Bill Kennedy	October 18, 2023
Cory and Bradley travel to Connecticut and convince Cory's mother Martha to stop speaking with the DOJ about the upcoming merger; she agrees, but warns Bradley that Cory is a bad person. Alex and Paul confide in each other about being alone. The UBA attends a benefit party, during which Paul confirms that Hyperion 2 will be launching in August to transport 2 people to the International Space Station. Meanwhile, Stella informs Mia of Paul's plans to fire Cory; she tells Stella to take the job because "White men don't give them up willingly". The same company that outed Bradley threaten to release a photo of Alex and Paul together, and they refuse Paul's money to get rid of the story. The UBA team are shocked when news breaks of the overturning of Roe v. Wade. Stella's friend Kate, a disgruntled former employee of Hyperion, meets with her at UBA to caution her about the merger. When Stella suggests they go speak to Paul, Kate gets nervous and declines, prompting Stella to admonish her. Stella tells Cory about Paul's offer and they hatch a plan together, agreeing that Stella will sign the employment contract, earn Paul's trust, and see how things play out. Chip sees Alex and Paul kissing in her office.
28	8	"DNF"	Millicent Shelton	Selina Fillinger	October 25, 2023
The photo with Alex and Paul kissing is leaked by "The Vault", causing Alex and Chip to have a disagreement about whether to release a statement addressing the leaked photo. Alex informs Cory that her interview with Paul will not be aired that week, to which Cory insists on having the interview aired the following week to improve the optics of the UBA acquisition deal by Paul. Alex's intended interview guest cancels, leading Chip to bring in another guest who confronts Alex on air about her relationship with Paul. Consequently, Alex fires Chip. Laura becomes jealous of Cory and scans through Bradley's emails previously posted online by the UBA hackers. She discovers that Hal is the one that assaulted the police officer at the Jan 6 Capitol riots and that Bradley and Cory covered it up. Andre and Mia reconcile. Stella asks Bradley to speak to Kate, but she is unsuccessful. Paul suggests to Alex that he is planning to sell off most of UBA's assets as soon as the purchase is completed and wants her involved in rebuilding UBA into a different company. Alex is surprised, but intrigued by the idea.
29	9	"Update Your Priors"	Stacie Passon	Teleplay by : Laura Wexler; Story by : Shalisha Francis-Feusner	November 1, 2023
Alex agonises over Paul's offer to sell off UBA, but a conversation with Maggie Brener convinces her to accept. Bradley, Stella, and Chip try to dig up dirt on Hyperion before the acquisition deal goes through. Alex asks Bradley to leave UBA with her but she declines, citing her concerns about Paul. Laura angrily confronts Bradley about Hal and breaks up with her, but says she won't report her to the police. Meanwhile, Cybil reveals that she has bought the majority of UBA shares in an attempt to stop the acquisition, and warns Cory that Paul is going to sell the network. Cory and Alex argue about her underhandedness, and he desperately tries to shut down the deal. Paul threatens Bradley to stop pursuing his company, revealing that he knows about Hal. Rattled during a report on the Russian invasion of Ukraine, she resigns on-air. In an attempt to destroy Cory, Paul plants an article in "The Vault" that Cory was grooming Bradley during her early days at UBA, and outed her and Laura to the press after she rejected him.
30	10	"The Overview Effect"	Mimi Leder	Teleplay by : Anya Leta; Story by : Charlotte Stoudt and Anya Leta	November 8, 2023
Bradley refuses to talk to Cory, and reveals that Paul knows about what they did for Hal. Alex is upset when she finds out that Paul planted the article. Stella tells the TMS team about Paul's plan to sell the company. Alex visits Bradley, who is paranoid that Paul is spying on her, and Bradley begs her to prevent the acquisition. Alex sends a text to Bradley that Paul later references, confirming that he has been surveiling her. Meanwhile, Yanko and Christine interview Chip on TMS and he publicly exposes Paul's plan to dismantle UBA which, alongside efforts from Cory and Cybil, helps to turn some of the voters on the board. Paul offers Cory money and the promise of clearing his name if he stops fighting the deal, but he declines. On the day of the vote, Alex proposes an alternative deal where Laura's network NBN offers to merge with UBA. Stella reveals that Paul had Kate cut the transmission on his rocket and masterminded the hack to blame UBA and hide that his tech malfunctioned. Alex tells Paul to pull out of the deal or she will report the story and end Hyperion. Bradley co-operates with the investigation to clear Cory's name. Alex supports Bradley and Hal to turn themselves in to the authorities.

=== Season 4 (2025) ===
No. overall	No. in season	Title	Directed by	Written by	Original release date
31	1	"My Roman Empire"	Mimi Leder	Charlotte Stoudt & Zander Lehmann	September 17, 2025
Two years later, the newly-merged UBN network announces the launch of an AI-generated dubbing program for the 2024 Summer Olympics. Alex prepares to interview Iranian fencer Roya Nazeri and her father Arsham, but decides to help the two escape from their Iranian handlers after receiving a note from Arsham that says "We want to defect". Alex visits her estranged father Martin, a university law professor, for help with Roya's situation, but he advises her against getting involved. Bradley, on parole and living in her West Virginia hometown, refuses Mia's offer to return to TMS. Bradley is later contacted by an anonymous source claiming that Martel Chemical Plant in the town of Wolf River, Ohio has been poisoning animals and causing cancer, and that UBA had suppressed the story five years ago. Intending to investigate the claim, Bradley accepts Mia's offer and convinces her FBI handler to let her return to New York without telling him of her agenda. Alex lambasts Bradley for returning, believing that UBN will not survive the backlash if Bradley's cover-up of Hal is revealed to the public. Alex then contacts Cory, who is now working as a movie producer, to discuss Bradley's return.
32	2	"The Revolution Will Be Televised"	Mimi Leder	Micah Schraft	September 24, 2025
Bradley returns to TMS and reunites with Chip, urging him to help her identify the anonymous whistleblower. Meanwhile, Alex is questioned by UBN's legal team after a leaked audio implicating her as having planned to help Roya and Arsham escape is uncovered; Alex claims that the audio is a deepfake. After confirming that the audio was tampered with, UBN board member Celine Dumont informs Alex that the Iranians may have been responsible. Christine skips a TMS promotional shoot to attend her daughter's recital, prompting Mia to scold her. At her father's behest, Alex reluctantly spends the day with Martin's student journalist Justice, and they attend a climate summit protest headed by Extinction Revolt. Alex reports the story on TMS, and Bradley recognizes the Extinction Revolt logo from a picture sent by her anonymous source. Chip deduces that the whistleblower is Bradley's former assistant Claire, and Bradley suspects that Claire could have been arrested in the protest. Elsewhere, Cory asks Stella for help in funding his film, but she coldly dismisses him. Cory later discovers that Stella is pursuing an affair with Celine's husband Miles, and blackmails her into granting him an overall deal with UBN.
33	3	"Tipping Point"	Stacie Passon	Jiehae Park	October 1, 2025
Forced to accommodate Cory's overall deal, Stella approaches Celine about having Cory return to UBN. Celine agrees, on the condition that Stella promotes Ben, UBN's head of sports, as head of the network's news division. Mia, upset over being passed over for the position, renounces Stella's friendship and decides to quit. Following her report on the climate summit protest, Alex discovers that billionaire eco-capitalist Zeke Pemberton has pulled his advertising on UBN. Stella and Celine force Alex to attend a conference to apologize to Pemberton, during which Alex runs into Paul Marks and his new girlfriend. Paul personally convinces Pemberton to return to UBN, and Alex emotionally confronts him about their past relationship. Elsewhere, Bradley and Chip find Claire, who admits to being the inside source and hesitantly refers them to UBA's former head of news Bethanne Hines. Chip later meets with Bethanne, who surreptitiously sends him a text message, telling him to investigate the UBA archives for the Wolf River depositions. Cory invites Bradley to his house, informing her that he is returning to UBN. Bradley kisses him, and they end up having sex.
34	4	"Love the Questions"	Stacie Passon	Christiana Mbakwe Medina	October 8, 2025
Chip learns that Kenneth Stockton, an environmental lawyer who handled the Wolf River depositions, had killed himself following a smear campaign by Eagle News. Alex learns of Bradley and Chip's investigation and offers to help negotiate with Eagle News for more information by trading a story about Pemberton. Yanko prepares to propose to his girlfriend Ariana on TMS, but his plans are derailed when the show is forced to report on an emergency landing at JFK. Yanko later expresses hesitancy on proposing after overhearing that Claire is back in town. Meanwhile, Martin blames Alex after Justice runs a story claiming that he plagiarized his book. Alex confronts Justice, who agrees to edit the story in exchange for a job at UBN; Alex refuses. Elsewhere, Cory learns that Celine wants to become CEO of UBN, and she presses Cory about the leverage he has on Stella. Cory is reluctant, but ultimately informs Celine about Stella and Miles' extramarital affair in order to advance his deal with the network. After successfully negotiating with Eagle News, Bradley is devastated to learn that Fred had hired Cory to help cover up the Wolf River story.
35	5	"Amari"	Millicent Shelton	Vanessa Baden Kelly	October 15, 2025
Mia interviews for a position at Defy Media, but Alex dissuades Defy Media from offering Mia the job in hopes of having Mia return to UBN. Christine, a two-time Olympic medalist, receives online backlash after being accused by her former teammate Tunde of doping at the London Olympics. Christine leaves an angry voicemail for Tunde, which is leaked and aired on Brodie Hartman's UBN podcast The Brofessional. Mia reconciles with Christine and convinces her to appear on The Brofessional to address the allegations; Christine confirms the doping allegations live on-air, tearfully disclosing that she used the drugs to cope with the loss of her baby son Amari. Alex reprimands Mia for potentially jeopardizing the network, after which Mia implies that she is "done" with UBN. Meanwhile, Bradley investigates Cory's emails and uncovers a picture of a woman standing next to Kenneth; Cory discovers Bradley's search history and angrily confronts her for taking advantage of their relationship. He admits to covering up the Wolf River story under Fred's orders, but denies any involvement in the smear campaign against Kenneth. Bradley returns to her apartment and is confronted by her FBI handler.
36	6	"If Then"	Millicent Shelton	Zander Lehmann	October 22, 2025
Celine pushes Stella to unveil UBN's AI program early, even though it is unfinished. Christine boycotts the unveiling event when Stella rejects her request for a better deal, leading Alex to ask Brodie to co-host. Brodie bonds with Alex at a bar, but backs out of co-hosting when Stella and Celine refuse to let him host the upcoming presidential debate. Following an argument with Miles, Stella confides to her personal AI chatbot about her insecurities around being CEO. Meanwhile, Chip identifies the woman standing next to Kenneth as Sophia Volk, the former quality control manager at Martel Chemical Plant; Bradley contacts Sophia for more information. Also, Cory learns from his mother that Celine's family had paid Fred to kill the Wolf River story. Celine intimidates Cory into staying silent about her involvement. At the unveiling event, Stella's AI chatbot accidentally reveals her personal thoughts to the audience, including her affair with Miles. Humiliated, Stella resigns as CEO and leaves a letter for Mia containing a flash drive, encouraging her to leverage the "power void" at UBN. Stella persuades Miles to travel with her to Naples, but he ultimately chooses to stay with Celine, forcing an emotional Stella to board her flight alone.
37	7	"Person of Interest"	Miguel Arteta	Bill Kennedy	October 29, 2025
Bradley is asked by her FBI handler to locate Claire, who is now wanted by the FBI due to her connection with Extinction Revolt. At the same time, Yanko receives a visit from Claire and agrees to let her stay at his apartment; the two reflect on their past relationship. Despite his unresolved feelings for Claire, Yanko officially decides to propose to Ariana, who happily accepts. Following Stella's resignation, Alex is approached by a reporter intending to write an exposé about UBN's workplace culture. Brodie helps Alex by opening up to the reporter about his turbulent childhood, redirecting the focus of the article. Alex has sex with Brodie, but sends him away afterwards. At Alex's request, Christine conducts a follow-up interview with Roya on TMS in order to bolster Roya's asylum case. Upon discovering that Claire is staying with Yanko, Bradley hesitantly agrees to help Claire run away by lying to the FBI about her whereabouts. The following morning, however, Claire arrives at UBN, having organized a live interview on TMS to prove her innocence. Worried that she will be implicated for aiding a fugitive, Bradley alerts the FBI, who promptly arrive at UBN to arrest Claire.
38	8	"The Parent Trap"	Miguel Arteta	Sharon Hoffman & Micah Schraft	November 5, 2025
Alex angrily lambasts Bradley for turning in Claire, but Bradley reveals that she is traveling to Belarus to locate and interview Sophia. Meanwhile, Celine is advised by her brother to return to France, as their family is unimpressed with her handling of UBN. Also, Cory learns that his dementia-ridden mother has decided to partake in euthanasia. Despite his pleas to convince her otherwise, Martha professes her love for Cory, and then secretly ingests a euthanasia tablet while he is away. Upset over his mother's death, Cory goes on a drug-fueled binge with Celine. Elsewhere, Alex refuses to let Martin appear on TMS to defend himself against Justice's plagiarism accusations. Brodie, still hurt by Alex sending him away after their sexual encounter, agrees to interview Martin on his podcast. Martin's comments on Brodie's podcast causes Alex to lose a coveted interview with Joe Biden; Martin is unsympathetic and coldly reveals that he has always blamed Alex for the disappearance of his wife, who ran away after struggling with postpartum depression. Alex visits Bradley's apartment and encounters Chip, who informs her that Bradley has already left for Belarus. With no recent communication from Bradley, Chip fears that she may have been detained.
39	9	"Un Bel Di"	Mimi Leder	Story by : Colleen Bradley; Teleplay by : Micah Schraft & Zander Lehmann	November 12, 2025
Bradley is detained at the Minsk Belarus airport under suspicion of espionage, and Alex informs Celine and Ben about the Wolf River investigation. After speaking with Chip, Alex reluctantly seeks help from Paul, who agrees to leverage his connections with Russian oligarch Dmitry Ivanov. Mia, Alex and Paul attend an opera performance with Dmitry and his wife to negotiate Bradley's release, but Mia overhears Dmitry expressing that he wants a better deal. Upon learning that Dmitry wants to obtain access to AI software developed by Paul, Alex proposes that UBN license the software despite the potential federal repercussions. However, Chip later informs Alex that the negotiation has fallen through, and Bradley is formally charged with conspiracy and imprisoned. Mourning his mother's death, Cory continues to bond with Celine, and the two nearly have sex; Celine is later seen searching through Martha's personal belongings for evidence related to the Wolf River cover-up. It is revealed that Celine sabotaged Alex and Paul's deal after receiving a tip from Paul's chief of staff, Amanda. Cory uncovers an EPA contamination report stuffed in a jacket pocket among Martha's possessions.
40	10	"Knowing Violation"	Mimi Leder	Charlotte Stoudt & Joey Longstreet	November 19, 2025
Having begun a sexual relationship with Celine, Cory offers to give the EPA report to the Dumont family if Celine helps negotiate Bradley's release, but becomes conflicted when Miles reveals that Martha brokered the Wolf River cover-up in exchange for getting Cory a job at UBA. Ben seeks Mia's help in investigating the person responsible for Alex's deepfake audio, and Mia discovers that Celine orchestrated the deepfake. Alex demands Celine's resignation, but Celine threatens to reveal Alex and Paul's negotiation with Dmitry. Faced with no choice, Alex announces her resignation live on TMS. Alex seeks advice from Martin, who suggests that she sue Celine for wrongful dismissal. Alex and Martin hold a press conference accusing UBN of corruption and announcing Alex's intentions to sue Celine; Ben defies Celine and runs the story on TMS. Outraged, Celine calls Cory and threatens to keep Bradley in prison unless Alex stops the conference. However, Cory broadcasts the phone call live during the conference, and it is revealed that Cory has given Alex the EPA report. Celine leaves the country for France, leaving the UBN board to find a new interim CEO. Bradley is released from prison and has an emotional reunion with Alex.

== Production ==
=== Development ===
On November 8, 2017, it was announced that Apple had given the production a series order consisting of two seasons of ten episodes apiece. The series was set to be executive produced by Jennifer Aniston, Reese Witherspoon, Jay Carson, and Michael Ellenberg. Carson was expected to act as a writer and showrunner for the series as well. Production companies involved with the series were slated to consist of Media Res, Echo Films, and Hello Sunshine. On April 4, 2018, it was announced that Carson had departed the production over creative differences. He was replaced as executive producer and showrunner by Kerry Ehrin. On July 11, 2018, it was reported that Mimi Leder would serve as a director and executive producer for the series. On October 23, 2018, it was reported that Kristin Hahn and Lauren Levy Neustadter would serve as additional executive producers for the series.

On June 22, 2020, Aniston revealed in a Variety interview with Lisa Kudrow that the show's development began prior to the Me Too movement, but was ultimately reworked to include and partially focus on it. The show cost $15 million per episode, with Aniston and Witherspoon each earning $2 million per episode, not including producing fees and ownership points. On January 10, 2022, Apple renewed the series for a third season. On May 1, 2023, Apple renewed the series for a fourth season. Ahead of the launch of the fourth season, Apple confirmed a fifth season had been commissioned on September 16, 2025. On July 23, 2026, it was announced that the series would end with its fifth season.

=== Casting ===
Alongside the initial series announcement, it was confirmed that Aniston and Witherspoon had been cast in the series' lead roles. In October 2018, it was announced that Steve Carell, Gugu Mbatha-Raw, Billy Crudup, Néstor Carbonell and Mark Duplass had been cast in series regular roles. On November 7, 2018, it was reported that Bel Powley, Karen Pittman, and Desean Terry had joined the main cast of the series.

On October 9, 2020, Greta Lee and Ruairi O'Connor officially joined the second season as regular characters. On November 13, 2020, Hasan Minhaj was also announced as a new cast member. On December 3, 2020, Julianna Margulies announced she joined the second season of the series. In August 2022, it was announced that Jon Hamm and Nicole Beharie had joined the main cast for the third season, with Tig Notaro joining in a recurring role.

In June 2024, it was announced that Marion Cotillard had joined the fourth season of the series. In July 2024, Jeremy Irons joined the cast, followed by William Jackson Harper. Later that month, Aaron Pierre was cast in a series regular role, while Boyd Holbrook joined in a recurring capacity. It was also reported that Julianna Margulies would not return for the fourth season.

In March 2026, it was announced that Jeff Daniels had joined the fifth season of the series in a recurring role. Later that month, Jesse Williams joined the cast, followed by Reneé Rapp and Sean Hayes in recurring roles. In April 2026, it was announced that Jeff Wilbusch and Sydney Park had joined the cast in recurring roles. In May 2026, it was announced that Lizzy Caplan had joined the cast in a recurring role.

=== Filming ===
Principal photography for the first season commenced on October 31, 2018, at the James Oviatt Building in Los Angeles. Filming continued in Los Angeles until filming started in New York City on May 9, 2019. Production on the first season also concluded that May, after seven months of filming.

Production on the second season began on February 24, 2020. On March 12, 2020, Apple TV+ halted production on the series due to the COVID-19 pandemic. The second season resumed filming on October 19, 2020. Between February and March 2021, Steve Carell, Jennifer Aniston, Mark Duplass, and Hannah Leder were spotted in Los Angeles filming the second season. On May 18, 2021, filming for season two concluded.

Production on the third season began on August 16, 2022, and it was announced on February 11, 2023, that the season's filming had wrapped up. Production on the fourth season began on July 8, 2024, and finished on December 5, 2024. The fifth and final season wrapped up filming in early August 2026.

== Release and reception ==
After the Apple Special Event of March 25, 2019, Witherspoon announced on Instagram that the series would premiere in the fall of 2019. It premiered on Apple TV+ on November 1, 2019. In January 2021, Apple announced that the second season would premiere in 2021. The second season premiered on September 17, 2021. The third season premiered on September 13, 2023. The fourth season premiered on September 17, 2025.

During the Apple Special Event, a teaser trailer was released with footage from the series as well as footage from other original series set to premiere on Apple TV+. Furthermore, Aniston, Witherspoon, and Carell were at the event to promote the series. On August 12, 2019, Apple released a first look trailer for the series. It was also revealed that the series would be titled Morning Wars in Australia, in order to distinguish the series from the Australian morning talk show of the same name.

=== Home media ===
Blu-ray and DVD sets of Seasons 1 and 2 was released on November 11, 2025 by Fifth Season. Season 3 is set to be released on DVD on October 20, 2026.

=== Critical response ===
Critical response of The Morning Show
Season	Rotten Tomatoes	Metacritic
1	62% (107 reviews)	61 (37 reviews)
2	67% (51 reviews)	60 (25 reviews)
3	75% (93 reviews)	65 (30 reviews)
4	72% (36 reviews)	55 (15 reviews)

On Rotten Tomatoes it received an overall score of 68%, and an overall score of 61 on Metacritic.

For the first season of The Morning Show, the review aggregation website Rotten Tomatoes reported a 61% approval rating, based on 106 reviews, with an average rating of 5.9/10. The website's critical consensus reads, "Flashy, but somewhat frivolous, The Morning Show often feels more like a vanity project than the hard-hitting drama it aspires to be—but there is pleasure to be had in watching Jennifer Aniston and Reese Witherspoon give it their all." Metacritic, which uses a weighted average, assigned a score of 61 out of 100 based on reviews from 37 critics, indicating "generally favorable reviews".

The second season of the series received a 67% from Rotten Tomatoes based on 51 reviews. The website's critical consensus reads, "The Morning Show's second season has a slew of stupendous performances—but too many characters attempting to address too many hot-button issues makes it hard to know what any of them are actually trying to say." At Metacritic, the website gave the second season a 60 out of 100, based on 25 reviews.

The third season of the series received a 75% from Rotten Tomatoes based on 93 reviews. The website's critical consensus reads, "Leaning into its soapier elements while bolstering an already star-studded cast with some welcome additions, The Morning Show upgrades from a shaky prestige program into an addictive guilty pleasure." At Metacritic, the website gave the third season a 65 out of 100, based on 30 reviews.

The fourth season of the series received a score of 72% from Rotten Tomatoes based on 36 reviews. The website's critical consensus reads, "Shaking up its ensemble yet again while staying consistent in its tonal unevenness, The Morning Show's fourth season ought to satisfy viewers who consider excess to be a virtue." At Metacritic, the website gave the fourth season a 55 out of 100, based on 15 reviews.

Richard Roeper of the Chicago Sun-Times gave a positive review and wrote: "The Morning Show doesn't have the cinematic gravitas of the Showtime series The Loudest Voice or the Aaron Sorkin poetry of HBO's The Newsroom. It's more along the lines of the solid but underachieving Sports Night TV series from the late 1990s."

=== Audience viewership ===
According to TV analytics provider TVision, The Morning Show has been viewed by panel members 5.03 times as much as the average Apple TV+ original series or shows TVision has measured since Apple TV+ launched in November 2019. The series became the second-most watched Apple TV+ series after Ted Lasso.

In December 2023, Deadline reported after the third season was released, the show became Apple TV+'s most watched series.

== Accolades ==
Year	Award	Category	Recipient(s)	Result	Ref.
Season 1
2020	Black Reel Television Awards	Outstanding Supporting Actress, Drama Series	Gugu Mbatha-Raw	Nominated	
2020	Critics' Choice Television Awards	Best Supporting Actor in a Drama Series	Billy Crudup	Won	
2020	Dorian Awards	Best Supporting TV Performance – Actor	Billy Crudup	Nominated	
2020	Golden Globe Awards	Best Television Series – Drama	The Morning Show	Nominated	
2020	Golden Globe Awards	Best Actress in a Television Series – Drama	Jennifer Aniston	Nominated	
2020	Golden Globe Awards	Best Actress in a Television Series – Drama	Reese Witherspoon	Nominated	
2020	Newport Beach Film Festival	Breakout Honoree	Bel Powley	Won	
2020	Newport Beach Film Festival	Artist of Distinction	Gugu Mbatha-Raw	Won	
2020	Online Film & Television Association	Best Actress in a Drama Series	Jennifer Aniston	Nominated	
2020	Online Film & Television Association	Best Supporting Actor in a Drama Series	Billy Crudup	Won	
2020	Online Film & Television Association	Best Guest Actor in a Drama Series	Martin Short	Nominated	
2020	Online Film & Television Association	Best New Title Sequence	Angus Wall, Hazel Baird, Emanuele Marani, EJ Kang, Peter Murphy and Erik Righetti	Nominated	
2020	Primetime Emmy Awards	Outstanding Lead Actor in a Drama Series	Steve Carell (for "Lonely at the Top")	Nominated	
2020	Primetime Emmy Awards	Outstanding Lead Actress in a Drama Series	Jennifer Aniston (for "In the Dark Night of the Soul It's Always 3:30 in the Morning")	Nominated	
2020	Primetime Emmy Awards	Outstanding Supporting Actor in a Drama Series	Billy Crudup (for "Chaos is the New Cocaine")	Won	
2020	Primetime Emmy Awards	Outstanding Supporting Actor in a Drama Series	Mark Duplass (for "The Interview")	Nominated	
2020	Primetime Emmy Awards	Outstanding Directing for a Drama Series	Mimi Leder (for "The Interview")	Nominated	
2020	Primetime Creative Arts Emmy Awards	Outstanding Guest Actor in a Drama Series	Martin Short (for "Chaos is the New Cocaine")	Nominated	
2020	Primetime Creative Arts Emmy Awards	Outstanding Main Title Design	Angus Wall, Hazel Baird, Emanuele Marani, EJ Kang, Peter Murphy and Erik Righetti	Nominated	
2020	Primetime Creative Arts Emmy Awards	Outstanding Production Design for a Narrative Contemporary Program (One Hour or More)	John Paino, James F. Truesdale and Amy Wells (for "In the Dark Night of the Soul It's Always 3:30 in the Morning")	Nominated	
2020	The ReFrame Stamp	Top 100 Popular Television (2019–2020)	The Morning Show (season 1)	Won	
2020	Screen Actors Guild Awards	Outstanding Performance by a Male Actor in a Drama Series	Steve Carell	Nominated	
2020	Screen Actors Guild Awards	Outstanding Performance by a Male Actor in a Drama Series	Billy Crudup	Nominated	
2020	Screen Actors Guild Awards	Outstanding Performance by a Female Actor in a Drama Series	Jennifer Aniston	Won	
2020	Television Critics' Association Awards	Outstanding New Program	The Morning Show	Nominated	
2021	Artios Awards	Outstanding Achievement in Casting – Television Pilot and First Season – Drama	Victoria Thomas	Nominated	
2021	AARP Movies for Grownups Awards	Best Actress – Television	Jennifer Aniston	Nominated	
Season 2
2022	Art Directors Guild Awards	Excellence in Production Design - One Hour Contemporary Single-Camera Series	Nelson Coates	Nominated	
2022	Cinema Audio Society Awards	Outstanding Achievement in Sound Mixing for Television Series – One Hour	William B. Kaplan, Elmo Ponsdomenech, Jason "Frenchie" Gaya, Carter Burwell, Brian Smith, and James Howe (for "My Least Favorite Year")	Nominated	
2022	Critics' Choice Television Awards	Best Supporting Actor in a Drama Series	Billy Crudup	Nominated	
2022	Golden Globe Awards	Best Television Series – Drama	The Morning Show	Nominated	
2022	Golden Globe Awards	Best Actress in a Television Series – Drama	Jennifer Aniston	Nominated	
2022	Golden Globe Awards	Best Supporting Actor – Television	Billy Crudup	Nominated	
2022	Golden Globe Awards	Best Supporting Actor – Television	Mark Duplass	Nominated	
2022	Golden Reel Awards	Outstanding Achievement in Sound Editing – Series 1 Hour – Dialogue / ADR	Mark Relyea, Julie Altus, Robert Guastini, and Pernell Salinas (for "My Least Favorite Year")	Nominated	
2022	Hollywood Critics Association TV Awards	Best Streaming Series, Drama	The Morning Show	Nominated	
2022	Hollywood Critics Association TV Awards	Best Actress in a Streaming Series, Drama	Jennifer Aniston	Nominated	
2022	Hollywood Critics Association TV Awards	Best Actress in a Streaming Series, Drama	Reese Witherspoon	Nominated	
2022	Hollywood Critics Association TV Awards	Best Supporting Actor in a Streaming Series, Drama	Billy Crudup	Nominated	
2022	Hollywood Critics Association TV Awards	Best Writing in a Streaming Series, Drama	Kerry Ehrin and Scott Troy (for "La Amara Vita")	Nominated	
2022	Primetime Emmy Awards	Outstanding Lead Actress in a Drama Series	Reese Witherspoon (for "Confirmations")	Nominated	
2022	Primetime Emmy Awards	Outstanding Supporting Actor in a Drama Series	Billy Crudup (for "My Least Favorite Year")	Nominated	
2022	Primetime Creative Arts Emmy Awards	Outstanding Guest Actress in a Drama Series	Marcia Gay Harden (for "Testimony")	Nominated	
2022	Producers Guild of America Awards	Outstanding Producer of Episodic Television – Drama	The Morning Show	Nominated	
2022	Screen Actors Guild Awards	Outstanding Performance by a Male Actor in a Drama Series	Billy Crudup	Nominated	
2022	Screen Actors Guild Awards	Outstanding Performance by a Female Actor in a Drama Series	Jennifer Aniston	Nominated	
2022	Screen Actors Guild Awards	Outstanding Performance by a Female Actor in a Drama Series	Reese Witherspoon	Nominated	
2022	Screen Actors Guild Awards	Outstanding Performance by an Ensemble in a Drama Series	Jennifer Aniston, Shari Belafonte, Eli Bildner, Néstor Carbonell, Steve Carell, Billy Crudup, Mark Duplass, Amber Friendly, Janina Gavankar, Valeria Golino, Tara Karsian, Hannah Leder, Greta Lee, Julianna Margulies, Joe Marinelli, Michelle Meredith, Ruairi O'Connor, Joe Pacheco, Karen Pittman, Victoria Tate, Desean Terry, and Reese Witherspoon	Nominated	
2022	Writers Guild of America Awards	Dramatic Series	Jeff Augustin, Brian Chamberlayne, Kerry Ehrin, Kristen Layden, Erica Lipez, Justin Matthews, Adam Milch, Stacy Osei-Kuffour, Torrey Speer, Scott Troy, Ali Vingiano	Nominated	
2022	Writers Guild of America Awards	Episodic Drama	Kerry Ehrin & Scott Troy (for "La Amara Vita")	Nominated	
Season 3
2023	American Film Institute Awards	Top 10 Television Programs of the Year	The Morning Show	Won	
2024	Critics' Choice Television Awards	Best Drama Series	The Morning Show	Nominated	
2024	Critics' Choice Television Awards	Best Actress in a Drama Series	Jennifer Aniston	Nominated	
2024	Critics' Choice Television Awards	Best Actress in a Drama Series	Reese Witherspoon	Nominated	
2024	Critics' Choice Television Awards	Best Supporting Actor in a Drama Series	Billy Crudup	Won	
2024	Critics' Choice Television Awards	Best Supporting Actress in a Drama Series	Nicole Beharie	Nominated	
2024	Critics' Choice Television Awards	Best Supporting Actress in a Drama Series	Karen Pittman	Nominated	
2024	Golden Globe Awards	Best Television Series – Drama	The Morning Show	Nominated	
2024	Golden Globe Awards	Best Supporting Actor – Television	Billy Crudup	Nominated	
2024	People's Choice Awards	Drama Show of the Year	The Morning Show	Nominated	
2024	People's Choice Awards	Female TV Star of the Year	Jennifer Aniston	Nominated	
2024	People's Choice Awards	Female TV Star of the Year	Reese Witherspoon	Nominated	
2024	People's Choice Awards	Drama TV Star of the Year	Jennifer Aniston	Won	
2024	People's Choice Awards	Drama TV Star of the Year	Reese Witherspoon	Nominated	
2024	People's Choice Awards	TV Performance of the Year	Jon Hamm	Nominated	
2024	Primetime Emmy Awards	Outstanding Drama Series	The Morning Show	Nominated	
2024	Primetime Emmy Awards	Outstanding Directing for a Drama Series	Mimi Leder (for "The Overview Effect")	Nominated	
2024	Primetime Emmy Awards	Outstanding Lead Actress in a Drama Series	Jennifer Aniston	Nominated	
2024	Primetime Emmy Awards	Outstanding Lead Actress in a Drama Series	Reese Witherspoon	Nominated	
2024	Primetime Emmy Awards	Outstanding Supporting Actor in a Drama Series	Billy Crudup	Won	
2024	Primetime Emmy Awards	Outstanding Supporting Actor in a Drama Series	Mark Duplass	Nominated	
2024	Primetime Emmy Awards	Outstanding Supporting Actor in a Drama Series	Jon Hamm	Nominated	
2024	Primetime Emmy Awards	Outstanding Supporting Actress in a Drama Series	Nicole Beharie	Nominated	
2024	Primetime Emmy Awards	Outstanding Supporting Actress in a Drama Series	Greta Lee	Nominated	
2024	Primetime Emmy Awards	Outstanding Supporting Actress in a Drama Series	Karen Pittman	Nominated	
2024	Primetime Emmy Awards	Outstanding Supporting Actress in a Drama Series	Holland Taylor	Nominated	
2024	Primetime Creative Arts Emmy Awards	Outstanding Contemporary Hairstyling	Nicole Venables, Jennifer Petrovich, Janine Thompson and Lona Vigi (for "The Kármán Line")	Won	
2024	Primetime Creative Arts Emmy Awards	Outstanding Contemporary Makeup (Non-Prosthetic)	Cindy Williams, Liz Villamarin, Angela Levin, Tracey Levy, Keiko Wedding and Amy Schmiederer (for "Strict Scrutiny")	Won	
2024	Primetime Creative Arts Emmy Awards	Outstanding Guest Actress in a Drama Series	Marcia Gay Harden (for "Update Your Priors")	Nominated	
2024	Primetime Creative Arts Emmy Awards	Outstanding Production Design for a Narrative Contemporary Program (One Hour or More)	Nelson Coates, Thomas Wilkins and Lauree Martell (for "The Kármán Line")	Nominated	
2024	Primetime Creative Arts Emmy Awards	Outstanding Casting for a Drama Series	Victoria Thomas	Nominated	
2024	Producers Guild of America Awards	Outstanding Producer of Episodic Television – Drama	The Morning Show	Nominated	
2024	Satellite Awards	Best Genre Series	The Morning Show	Nominated	
2024	Screen Actors Guild Awards	Outstanding Performance by a Male Actor in a Drama Series	Billy Crudup	Nominated	
2024	Screen Actors Guild Awards	Outstanding Performance by a Female Actor in a Drama Series	Jennifer Aniston	Nominated	
2024	Screen Actors Guild Awards	Outstanding Performance by an Ensemble in a Drama Series	Jennifer Aniston, Nicole Beharie, Shari Belafonte, Nestor Carbonell, Billy Crudup, Mark Duplass, Jon Hamm, Theo Iyer, Hannah Leder, Greta Lee, Julianna Margulies, Tig Notaro, Karen Pittman and Reese Witherspoon	Nominated	
Season 4
2026	Actor Awards	Outstanding Performance by a Male Actor in a Drama Series	Billy Crudup	Nominated	
2026	Critics' Choice Television Awards	Best Supporting Actor in a Drama Series	Billy Crudup	Nominated	
2026	Critics' Choice Television Awards	Best Supporting Actress in a Drama Series	Nicole Beharie	Nominated	
2026	Critics' Choice Television Awards	Best Supporting Actress in a Drama Series	Greta Lee	Nominated	
2026	Golden Globe Awards	Best Supporting Actor – Television	Billy Crudup	Nominated	
2026	Primetime Emmy Awards	Outstanding Supporting Actor in a Drama Series	Billy Crudup	Nominated	
2026	Satellite Awards	Best Supporting Actor - Television	Billy Crudup	Nominated	
