= The Revolution Will Not Be Televised (book) =

2004 book by Joe Trippi

- Author: Joe Trippi
- Language: English
- Genre: Non-fiction
- Publisher: ReganBooks
- Publication date: 2004
- Publication place: United States
- ISBN: 0-06-076155-5

The Revolution Will Not Be Televised: Democracy, the Internet, and the Overthrow of Everything (ISBN 0-06-076155-5) is a book written by Joe Trippi and published in 2004 by ReganBooks. The book describes Trippi's steps while running the campaign for Howard Dean on the internet in 2004. Trippi argues that the internet has changed politics and democracy and how politicians can and will use the internet for their campaigns. According to Ezra Klein, the book is less a memoir than an analysis of how to campaign successfully.

== Reception ==
The Wall Street Journal in their review called Trippi "a savvy evangelist for the Internet" but found the book breathless and a blur of campaign engagements, and they criticised him for failing to clearly explain how the internet can be used for promotion.
