= Rachel Marsh =

Filipino-American actress

- Born: February 24, 1992 (age 34); Seattle, Washington, U.S.
- Occupation: Actress
- Years active: 2017–present
- Television: Unstable

Rachel Marsh (born February 24, 1992) is a Filipino-American comedian and actress.

== Early life ==
She took part in competitive cheerleading as well as drama in high school. She moved to Los Angeles, in California from Washington initially to study business and worked in marketing, as well as for a non-profit company and co-owned a coffee shop, but later also took comedy and improv classes.

== Career ==
She appeared as a member of the comedy troupe Upright Citizens Brigade. After appearing in short films in 2017, she appeared in The Kids Table in 2018. Following that, Marsh appeared in a number of television roles such as Before We Go, NCIS: Los Angeles, and iCarly, as well as American Psychos and ReCalibrate!.

Her film roles include Half Vanilla, which received an award at the London Independent Film Awards. She appeared as biotech engineer Luna Castillo in both seasons of Rob Lowe and John Owen Lowe Netflix comedy series Unstable.

In 2024, she joined the cast of season four of Apple TV+ drama series The Morning Show as Remy, assistant to Alex (Jennifer Aniston). She has a recurring role as dental student Carly from 2025 in comedy television series Adults. In the second series, as her character dreams of a pop career, Marsh sings the song Hiccup as part of the role.

In 2025, Marsh could be seen as Claudia in the second season of the Amazon Prime Video series Fallout. In 2026, she portrayed the character Anh Pham in the film adaptation The Love Hypothesis.

== Personal life ==
A Filipino-American, Marsh was born in Seattle and grew up north of the city in Bothell, Washington. Her father is Filipino Hawaiian, and grew up in Hawaii but settled in Seattle after serving in the Vietnam War. Her mother died when she was 13 years old; she has a brother and a sister. Her paternal grandparents are from Manila. She has taken Tagalog language classes. Her father later lived in Arlington.

== Partial filmography ==
| Year | Title | Role | Notes |
|---|---|---|---|
| 2018 | Half Vanilla | | |
| 2018 | The Kids Table | Chloe | 5 episodes |
| 2019 | Recalibrate! | Fluff/Beatbox | TV film |
| 2019 | Before We Go | Charlie | 6 episodes |
| 2020 | NCIS: Los Angeles | Lily Chen | Episode: "High Society" |
| 2021 | iCarly | Toji | Episode: "iNeed Space" |
| 2021 | Head of the Class | Andrea | Episode: "Beaks and Cheeks" |
| 2021 | Just Beyond | Fiona | Episode: "Which Witch" |
| 2023–24 | Unstable | Luna | Main role |
| 2024 | NCIS: Hawaii | Dr. Cruz | Episodes: "Spill the Tea" and "Divided We Conquer" |
| 2025-present | Adults | Carly | 7 episodes |
| 2025 | The Morning Show | Remy | 5 episodes |
| 2025 | Fallout | Claudia | 5 episodes |
| 2026 | The Love Hypothesis | Anh | |
