= Wesam Keesh =

American actor

Wesam Keesh is an American actor who played Adam "Malachi" Mintock on season two of Law & Order: Organized Crime. He previously appeared in Awkward, For the People, Good Girls, NCIS: Los Angeles, and Zoobiquity and has been cast in Echo as of 2020 where he will play FBI agent Riley Burnside.

He was born in Tulsa, Oklahoma to a Syrian immigrant family; his father grew up in Jaramana, Damascus Governorate. Wesam attended Union High School and the University of Tulsa.
