= Hannah Leder =

American actress (born 1986)

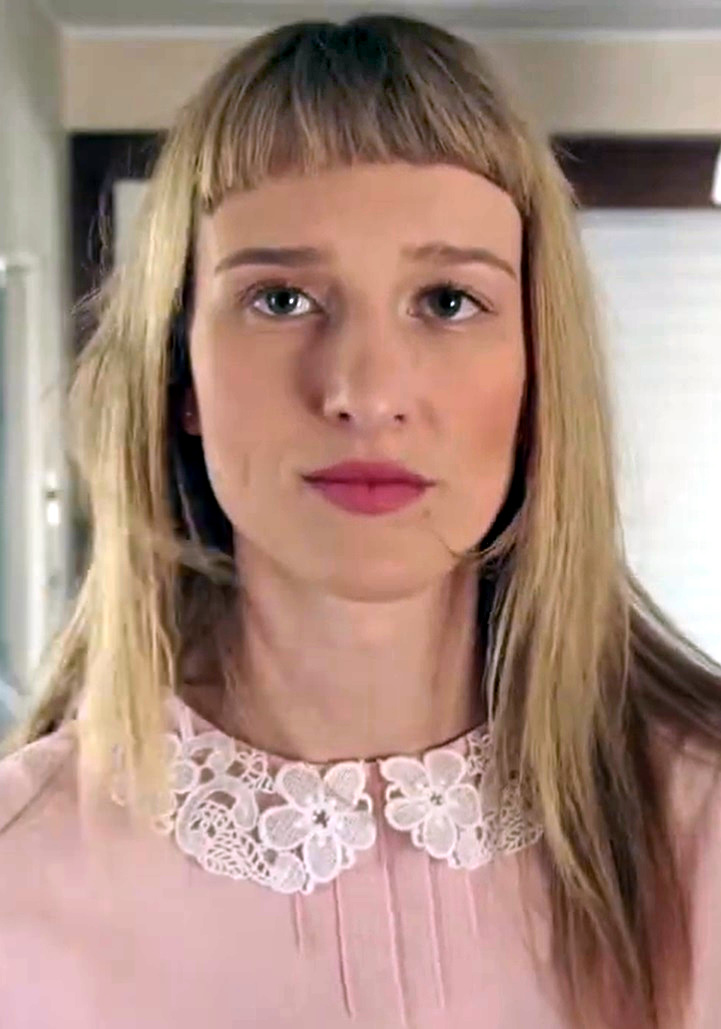
- Leder in 2016
- Born: September 28, 1986 (age 40); Los Angeles, California, U.S.
- Other names: Hannah Leder Werntz; Hannah Werntz
- Occupation: Actress
- Years active: 1997–present
- Spouse: Phil Danyew (m. 2017)
- Children: 1
- Parent(s): Mimi Leder; Gary Werntz

Hannah Leder (born September 28, 1986) is an American actress, screenwriter, and film director best known for co-directing, co-writing, and starring in the indie film The Planters (2019) with Alexandra Kotcheff. She is a recurring guest star on Apple TV’s The Morning Show, playing the role of Isabella.

Born in Los Angeles, Leder is the daughter of director Mimi Leder and actor Gary Werntz. As a child she appeared in the films The Peacemaker (1997), Deep Impact (1998) and Pay It Forward (2000). She has also guest starred in the television series Shameless, Dads, Bad Judge, Revenge and The Comeback.

== Filmography ==
Film
Year	Title	Role	Notes
1997	The Peacemaker	Piano Student	
1998	Deep Impact	Holly Rittenhouse	
2000	Pay It Forward	Thorsen's Daughter	
2016	Auto-Cowrecked	Tara	Short film, also director, editor and producer
2018	The Planters	Sadie Mayflower	Also co-director, co-screenwriter and producer
TBA	Dirty Rules	Frankie	Short film, also writer and executive producer

Television
Year	Title	Role	Notes
2011	Shameless	Female Nurse	Episode: "Three Boys"
2011	Full Circle	Hannah	Episode: "Celeste & Tim"
2014	Dads	White Wine	Episode: "Warner's Got It Made"
2014	Bad Judge	Hannah	Episode: "One Brave Waitress"
2014	Revenge	Crystal	Episode: "Ambush"
2014	The Comeback	Lucy	Episode: "Valerie Gets What She Really Wants"
2015	Down Dog	Psychic	Unsold Amazon Video pilot
2016	Love	Lila	Episode: "Party in the Hills"
2019	The Morning Show	Isabella	Recurring Role

== Awards and nominations ==
Year	Association	Category	Project	Result	Ref.
2022	Screen Actors Guild Awards	Outstanding Performance by an Ensemble in a Drama Series	The Morning Show	Nominated	
2024	Screen Actors Guild Awards	Outstanding Performance by an Ensemble in a Drama Series	The Morning Show	Nominated	
