= Top of the Morning (book) =

Book by Brian Stelter

Top of the Morning: Inside the Cutthroat World of Morning TV
- First edition
- Author: Brian Stelter
- Language: English
- Genre: Non-fiction
- Publisher: Grand Central Publishing
- Publication date: April 23, 2013
- Publication place: United States
- Pages: 320 pages
- ISBN: 1455512877

Top of the Morning: Inside the Cutthroat World of Morning TV is a 2013 non-fiction book by the media critic Brian Stelter. The book was first published on April 23, 2013, through Grand Central Publishing and centers on the world of morning television. A lengthy excerpt appeared in The New York Times Magazine in the week before publication.

== Synopsis ==
In Top of the Morning, Stelter discusses several daytime television shows, their hosts, and events that he observed while working as a media reporter for The New York Times. The book focuses heavily on Ann Curry's replacing Meredith Vieira on the Today show, as well as covering other events such as the rivalry between Good Morning America and Today over morning television ratings.

== Reception ==
Critical reception for Top of the Morning has been mixed. The Washington Times gave a mostly positive review for the book, while Entertainment Weekly gave a mixed one. Entertainment Weekly stated that, while the book's quality improved as it progressed, the book was unlikable, and some elements - such as Robin Roberts' cancer - "has been documented better elsewhere". The Pittsburgh Post-Gazette and The Hollywood Reporter both panned the book, with the Pittsburgh Post-Gazette criticizing it as reading "more like a dispatch from someone working at TMZ than a New York Times reporter".

== Television adaptation ==
On December 17, 2013, the Lifetime television network announced it was adapting the book into a two-hour television film, but by 2016 the cable network's option on the project had lapsed.

The book now serves as inspiration for the drama series The Morning Show, which focuses on the life of people working in morning television. The series stars and is executive produced by Jennifer Aniston and Reese Witherspoon for Apple TV+. Stelter is a consulting producer on the show.
