= The Morning Show season 2 =

Season of American drama television series

The Morning Show
- Season 2
- Official poster
- Showrunner: Kerry Ehrin
- Starring: Jennifer Aniston; Reese Witherspoon; Billy Crudup; Mark Duplass; Greta Lee; Julianna Margulies; Bel Powley; Néstor Carbonell; Karen Pittman; Desean Terry; Ruairi O'Connor; Steve Carell
- No. of episodes: 10

Release
- Original network: Apple TV+
- Original release: September 17 – November 19, 2021

Season chronology
- ← Previous; Season 1 Next → Season 3

The second season of American drama television series The Morning Show (Note: also known as Morning Wars) premiered on Apple TV+ on September 17, 2021. It stars Jennifer Aniston and Reese Witherspoon as co-anchors of The Morning Show, a fictional morning television program who reunite on screen seven months after the events of the first season. Set in the first months of 2020, the season explores the impact of COVID-19 pandemic on the show and its parent company UBA. The ensemble cast also includes Billy Crudup, Mark Duplass and Steve Carell, joined by Julianna Margulies, Ruairi O'Connor and Greta Lee.

Ordered by Apple TV+ in November 2017, the second season of the series was developed alongside the first. Filming began in late February 2020, but was suspended 13 days later due to the COVID-19 pandemic. During a seven-months long hiatus, the script was rewritten to feature the pandemic as a core theme of the season. It also explored the topics of cancel culture, personal identity, racial inequality. The season was filmed from October 27, 2020, to May 14, 2020, in multiple locations across Southern California. It was produced by Echo Films, Media Res, Bad Attitude and Hello Sunshine; Kerry Ehrin, Mimi Leder Michael Ellenberg, Kristin Hahn, Lauren Levy Neustadter, Jennifer Aniston and Reese Witherspoon served as executive producers.

The season received mixed reviews from television critics, who praised directing and performance by Aniston and Crudup while commenting on lack of substantial storylines for recurring cast members. Other issues, including plot incoherence and irrationality pointed out in the first season, were also present. It has won no major accolades despite receiving 18 nominations. The season concluded on November 19, 2021, and on January 10, 2023, a third season was commissioned.

== Overview ==
The season takes place in the New York City from January 31, 2019, to late March 2020, 7 months after the events of the first season. Alex Levy (Jennifer Aniston) left The Morning Show (TMS) and lives a secluded life in Maine; Bradley Jackson (Reese Witherspoon) remained on TMS, and Cory Ellison (Billy Crudup) became a new CEO of UBA, the broadcasting company behind TMS.

The first three episodes follow Alex's momentous return to TMS to discontent of most its members, especially Bradley and the new Director of the News Direction Stella Bak (Greta Lee). Subsequent episodes feature multiple minor storylines involving around individual characters. Alex and Bradley contest hosting the 2020 Democratic Party presidential debates; Alex struggles to save her reputation, which is under threat by journalist Maggie Brener's (Marcia Gay Harden) book; Bradley starts a complicated romantic relationship with UBA journalist Laura Peterson (Julianna Margulies); weatherman Yanko Flores (Néstor Carbonell) faces suspension after an inadvertent on-air comment; Daniel Henderson (Desean Terry) and Mia Jordan (Karen Pittman) fight to broadcast Daniel's story about COVID-19 pandemic in China everyone else overlooks; and Cory pushes through a struggling subscription service UBA+ while trying to mitigate a lawsuit against UBA over the death of Hannah Shoenfeld, pressured by ousted UBA CEO Fred Micklen (Tom Irwin). As the season progresses, the COVID-19 pandemic engulfs the United States, forcing UBA and TMS to go on a lockdown. In a UBA+ broadcast from home, Alex accepts her imperfection and states that she is done apologizing for herself, solidifying her public image.

An unconnected side story follows exiled presenter Mitch Kessler (Steve Carell) in an estate on Lake Como in Italy as documentarian Paula Lambruschini (Valeria Golino) helps him reconsider his tenure on TMS and reclaim his life.

== Cast and characters ==
=== Main cast ===
- Jennifer Aniston as Alex Levy, a feminist icon and a former anchor of The Morning Show. She is writing her memoirs to forestall an upcoming exposé potentially containing unbased claims of her misbehaviors that could lead to her cancellation. After returning to host TMS, she attempts to strengthen her public image while her anxiety increases.
- Reese Witherspoon as Bradley Jackson, a hot-tempered host of The Morning Show who experiences an identity crisis after not being promoted to her desired position. She values journalistic objectivity, but forces herself to produce infotainment segments that appeal to a younger audience.
- Billy Crudup as Cory Elisson, an eccentric and forward-looking CEO of UBA. Pressured by the Board of Directors and his own morals, he has to cease an impeding Hannah Shoenfeld lawsuit that could undermine the company's reputation and cost him the job.
- Mark Duplass as Charlie "Chip" Black, an excecutive producer of TMS who took umbrage at Alex for mistreating him and breaking his feelings.
- Greta Lee as Stella Bak, a 33-year old Director of the News Division who reports directly to Cory. She was hired for her knowledge of new digital technologies to bring about he much-needed modernization to the company's stagnating news programs. An Asian American, she faces increased racial hate as the pandemic spreads.
- Julianna Margulies as Laura Peterson, a veteran journalist working for UBA, who anchored The Morning Show in the 90-s but was suspended aster she came out as lesbian. Known for her acute and persuasive questioning, she conducts interviews with Alex and Bradley, further endangering the former's public image and sparking a romance with the latter.
- Bel Powley as Claire Conway, (Note: Powley is only credited as a series regular in the ninth episode. In all other episodes, she is not credited and does not appear.) a former TMS production assistant who reveals that she is helping with funding the lawsuit against UBA over the death of Hannah Shoenfeld.
- Néstor Carbonell as Yanko Flores, a weatherman at TMS who occasionally anchors the show alongside Alex and Bradley.
- Karen Pittman as Mia Jordan, a producer of The Morning Show who handles backstage conflicts.
- Desean Terry as Daniel Henderson, The Morning Show's co-anchor of the weekend edition. He was the first to identify the menace of the pandemic while it was still developing in China, and, despite being sent to Wuhan to report on it, can't have the news broadcast on the show.
- Ruairi O'Connor as Ty Fitzgerald, a young expert on social media hired alongside Stella.
- Steve Carell as Mitch Kessler, a disgraced anchor of TMS who flees from his family to Italy and dwells on the death of Hannah Shoenfeld and his firing.

=== Recurring ===
- Hasan Minhaj as Eric Nomani, an anchor of TMS who worked alongside Bradley during the months of Alex's absence. He leaves to the host of UBA Evening News in the third episode.
- Valeria Golino as Paola Lambruschini, a documentarian who befriends Mitch in Italy.
- Marcia Gay Harden as Maggie Brener, a journalist who is writing a book that exposes the culture behind The Morning Show and explores working relationships between Alex and Mitch.
- Tom Irwin as Fred Micklen, former CEO of UBA who left the company after negotiating a payoff with Cory. He starts a smear campaign against Hannah Shoenfeld and threatens Cory to reveal how he was displaced to retaliate the lawsuit where he also becomes a defendant.
- Katie Aselton as Madeleine, Chip's new girlfriend. Their relationships deteriorate when Chip returns to TMS and can't help thinking about Alex.
- Holland Taylor as Cybil Reynolds, a long-standing member of UBA's Board of Directors.
- Markus Flanagan as Gerald Drummond, a UBA Board of Directors member who oversees TMS.
- Joe Tippett as Hal Jackson, Bradley's drug-addicted brother who visits her in New York.
- Mindy Kaling as Audra Khatri, a morning news presenter for rival broadcast corporation NBN.

==== Crew personnel ====
- Victoria Tate as Rena Robinson, a production assistant
- Amber Friendly as Layla Bell, a producer
- Joe Marinelli as Donny Spagnoli, a director
- Shari Belafonte as Julia, a floor manager
- Joe Pacheco as Bart Daley, a director
- Hannah Leder as Isabella, a production assistant
- Janina Gavankar as Alison Namazi, a substitute news anchor
- Theo Iyer as Kyle, Cory's assistant
- Will Arnett as Doug Klassen, Alex's agent
- Choni Francis as RJ Smith, Bradley's agent
- Tara Karsian as Gayle Bermann
- Eli Bildner as Joel Rapkin

=== Guest starring ===
- Martin Short as Dick Lundry, Mitch's close friend.
- Kathy Najimy as Sylvia Portman, a fortune teller whom Alex confronts in Maine.
- Oona Roche as Lizzy Craig, Alex's daughter who has a turbulent relationship with her.
- Embeth Davidtz as Paige Kessler, Mitch's divorced wife.

In addition, the rock band Foo Fighters appears and performs Making a Fire in the episode "Kill the Fatted Calf".

== Episodes ==
No. overall	No. in season	Title	Directed by	Written by	Original release date
11	1	"My Least Favorite Year"	Mimi Leder	Erica Lipez & Adam Milch and Kerry Ehrin	September 17, 2021
Following the events of Alex and Bradley's on-air exposé, Fred is put on administrative leave, while Cory is fired. Eight months later, and three months before the start of the 2020 COVID-19 pandemic empties the streets of New York, Alex has quit the show and lives a quiet and secluded life in Maine, while Bradley remains on the show with a new co-host, Eric. However, the show dwindles in ratings and Cory struggles in his faithfulness to Bradley, who wants to relocate to the evening news. Seeing no choice, Cory travels to Maine and attempts to convince Alex to return to the show, which she refuses. On New Years Eve, Mia chooses not to run a story about the impending pandemic, while Bradley learns that Eric will be moved to the evening news; she fights with Cory over his clear underhandedness, as she helped him get his job back. Alex receives a reading from a psychic that motivates her to call Cory and discuss the possibility of returning to UBA. Before Cory can celebrate the news of Alex's potential return, he sees a news ticker that reveals Hannah's family has filed a wrongful death lawsuit against UBA.
12	2	"It's Like the Flu"	Mimi Leder	Torrey Speer & Kristen Layden	September 24, 2021
Cory informs Bradley that Alex is in negotiations to return to the show, leading her to call in sick for three weeks to negotiate what she wants. Before Alex returns to the show, Cory tries to hold a small intimate dinner to welcome her back, but more and more guests are invited; over dinner, they discuss the novel coronavirus and whether it is newsworthy or not. When an overwhelmed Alex tries to leave early, she is confronted by Bradley, who is still angry that Alex abandoned her when she needed her the most. Alex also tries apologizing to Daniel, who is upset with her after ruining his chance to become anchor. While living in Italy, Mitch is confronted by a woman feigning anger at what he had done, intending to upload it to social media; another woman, Paola, comes to Mitch's defense. Cory decides to settle with Hannah's family, but realizes they are after more than money when he learns the dollar amount they asked for in negotiations. Alex asks Chip to return as her producer, which he agrees to.
13	3	"Laura"	Lesli Linka Glatter	Brian Chamberlayne & Jeff Augustin	October 1, 2021
Bradley covers the start of the campaign season, while Alex is confirmed to return to the show. Daniel and his colleagues travel to Wuhan to cover the COVID-19 pandemic and are forced to quarantine as a result of the lockdown. Mia ultimately cancels Daniel's segment to focus on other stories, much to his dismay. In Italy, Mitch meets with Paola, who reveals herself to be a documentarian. He agrees to help her in a documentary over an overturned rape case in the country. UBA journalist and news anchor Laura Peterson interviews Alex in advance of a tell-all book about UBA by Maggie Brener. During the interview with Laura, Alex feels uncomfortable when asked about her relationship with Mitch, and she maintains that she has not contacted him in a long time. Laura also interviews Bradley, and the two women build a bond in the process. Bradley ends up kissing Laura, who returns the kiss.
14	4	"Kill the Fatted Calf"	Jessica Yu	Ali Vingiano & Scott Troy	October 8, 2021
As UBA prepares to host the Democratic presidential debate, members of The Morning Show jockey for a spot. Daniel asks Mia to push for him to moderate the debate, but UBA's news division president Stella dismisses him. Cory keeps pushing for Alex, who is dead set against moderating. Bradley finally makes up with Cory, who informs her she is out of the running since they do not want two straight white women moderating. When Bradley informs Laura of this, the two argue as Laura cannot understand why Bradley refuses to admit her bisexuality after they had spent the night together, and Bradley is angered at being labeled. Meanwhile, Yanko receives backlash online after referring to Groundhog Day as his "spirit animal". Desperate to get their spots as moderator, Bradley comes out to Stella as bisexual, but fails to get the job, while Daniel goes off script and badly serenades Alex, confusing the staff. After consulting with Stella on the importance of her presence, Alex finally agrees to be a moderator. In Italy, Paola learns that she has been exposed to COVID-19 and informs Mitch she has potentially exposed him as well.
15	5	"Ghosts"	Tucker Gates	Erica Lipez & Adam Milch	October 15, 2021
Trying to put an end to the Shoenfeld lawsuit, Cory calls Fred to stop smearing Hannah's image. Fred refuses and threatens to publicly reveal that Cory helped negotiate his exit settlement if he can't make Hannah's family accept the deal. Desperate, Cory visits Hannah's father and warns him about the smear campaign, but his plea is ignored. After Yanko's apology is perceived as insincere, Stella arranges for Yanko to meet with the Seminole for a segment, but he refuses. Distressed over Maggie's upcoming book tour, Alex confronts Maggie, who reveals the book will mention her affair with Mitch. Angered to the point of physical pain, Alex ditches the debate, forcing Bradley to replace her. Also, Cory learns of Laura and Bradley's romantic relationship. Outside UBA, Stella is assaulted by a man spewing racist comments on COVID-19; Yanko fights with the man and the ensuing brawl is filmed by a passerby. In Italy, Paola and Mitch are quarantining together. Mitch reluctantly agrees to an interview about his past mistakes, in which he shows remorse for the way he treated Hannah after the Vegas incident.
16	6	"A Private Person"	Rachel Morrison	Torrey Speer & Stacy Osei-Kuffour	October 22, 2021
As Alex's absence from the show stretches out indefinitely, Cory brings in Laura as a substitute host, while Stella pressures Chip into getting Alex back as soon as possible. Bradley is thrilled that she and Laura can merge their personal and private lives, but things become complicated when Bradley's addict brother Hal appears at her apartment for a surprise visit. Despite feeling grateful for standing up to her, Stella is forced to suspend Yanko after his fight video goes viral. During the show, Cory leaks the news that Laura and Bradley are dating. Laura tries to reassure Bradley that they can deny the rumors, but Bradley is frustrated that she has to disclose her private life to the public. Upon returning home, Bradley is confronted by Hal, who is unsupportive of her relationship with Laura, and also reveals that he has been struggling to overcome his drug addiction. Meanwhile, Chip realizes that Alex is missing, and no one knows where she is.
17	7	"La Amara Vita"	Mimi Leder	Kerry Ehrin & Scott Troy	October 29, 2021
While quarantining with Paola in Italy, Mitch receives a surprise visit from Alex, who has flown in to demand he release a statement denying they ever had sex. After obtaining a promise that he will issue a denial, Alex prepares to leave Italy but is forced to stay due to the COVID-19 restriction measures. Returning to Mitch's mansion, Alex and Mitch spend time together; Alex confides that she missed him, and confesses that she once thought she was pregnant again after having sex with him. When a news report shows up detailing Mitch's preference towards African-American women, Alex decides to leave. Depressed, Mitch visits Paola and the two have sex. While Alex drives to the airport, Mitch drives back home. Feeling the turmoil of how people view him, Mitch carries out a suicide by willingly driving his automobile off a cliff.
18	8	"Confirmations"	Victoria Mahoney	Brian Chamberlayne & Ali Vingiano	November 5, 2021
When UBA is contacted by an Italian reporter asking for comment on Mitch's death, The Morning Show newsroom tries to confirm the story so they can break the news themselves. When Cory envisions Alex breaking the news live on air, Chip is forced to confess that he is no longer in contact with Alex. Hal drunkenly arrives at UBA and angrily confronts Bradley over her lesbian romance with Laura, prompting security to escort him out. Chip fears that Alex is dead after discovering that her last credit card charge was in Italy, and that there might have been a woman involved in the car crash with Mitch. Stella confronts Alex's assistant, who reveals that Alex had recently boarded a plane. When Alex finally arrives stateside, a relieved Chip reveals the news of Mitch's death to her; the network obtains a second confirmation of Mitch's death when Alex contacts Paola. Alex refuses to break the news to the viewers and instead decides to personally inform Paige, Mitch's wife. She is shocked when a resentful Paige reveals her knowledge about Alex's affair with Mitch. With Alex's blessing, Bradley breaks the news of Mitch's death live nationally on The Morning Show.
19	9	"Testimony"	Miguel Arteta	Scott Troy & Justin Matthews	November 12, 2021
With time running out before Maggie Brener's book is published, Alex offers to terminate her contract with The Morning Show but is turned down by Cory, who insists the network will protect her. Alex nevertheless braces herself to leave the show. Yanko reunites with Claire, who reveals that she is helping Hannah's family with the lawsuit. Meanwhile, Bradley takes Hal to rehab and announces her intentions to cut him off. Paige visits The Morning Show and informs the conflicted staff that they are welcome to a memorial in Mitch's honor; Alex gives a speech at the memorial, where she reveals she saw Mitch in Italy. Cory asks Bradley to interview Maggie about her book. To everyone's surprise, Bradley harshly criticizes Maggie for castigating Alex over her consensual affair with Mitch. The interview leads to widespread support of Alex. However, things change the following morning as leaked footage of Alex at Mitch's memorial goes viral. A distraught Alex trips and bumps her head, landing her in the hospital where it is revealed she has contracted COVID-19.
20	10	"Fever"	Mimi Leder	Kerry Ehrin	November 19, 2021
As COVID-19 begins to spread across the U.S., Bradley takes a leave of absence to search for Hal, who has gone missing. At the same time, Alex struggles during quarantine as she is symptomatic and is suffering emotionally from the fallout of the leaked footage of her at Mitch's memorial. To aid her, Chip asks Cory to have Alex do a program about her experiences with COVID-19. Cory decides to air the segment on the company's failing streaming service, UBA+. As the entire city and country shut down, the staff is told that they will have to operate from their homes, and Stella asks Daniel to be the main anchor for the time. Daniel refuses and quits his job to take care of his grandfather in Los Angeles. Cory decides to help Bradley in her quest to find Hal, before confessing that he is in love with her. He helps Bradley locate her brother who has managed to stay clean, but is in the hospital surrounded by COVID-19 patients. A feverish Alex manages to complete her segment on her symptoms, but tells the audience that she is done apologizing for who she is.

== Production ==
=== Development and filming ===
Apple ordered a second season of The Morning Show together with the first on November 8, 2017. Kerry Ehrin, who continued serving as showrunner and lead writer of the series, planned to set it as a direct continuation of the previous season and build upon its primary topics. Through characters' self-reflection and reassessment, she wanted to elaborate on what could be done to resolve the ongoing issues of social inequality within corporations. At the series premiere event held on October 28, 2019, Ehrin revealed to Variety that the outline for the first three episodes has been completed. She expected to finish filming in summer and release the season in November 2020, which would have coincided with the 2020 presidential election in the United States. It was clarified that politics would influence the backdrop, but assessing individual politicians or possible election outcomes was out of the season's scope. Ehrin would later extend her overall deal with Apple on May 4, 2020.

Filming for the season started on February 27, 2020, and continued for 13 days, during which the opening scenes of the first episode were shot. On March 12, 2020, production was completely suspended as the COVID-19 pandemic struck the television industry in the United States and continued to spread across the country. Later in March, New York City, where the series is majorly set, was closed, and director Mimi Leder sent drones to capture the city's emptied streets and boardwalks. Meanwhile, Ehrin opted to extend the initial two-week delay and write a new script that would cover the pandemic and its impact on the characters. During the shutdown, the first two episodes were completely rewritten and later episodes received modifications to make way for pandemic-related subplots. The scenes completed before the hiatus were included in the final cut as a prelude to the season, and a 9-month time jump was introduced to accommodate a new setting.

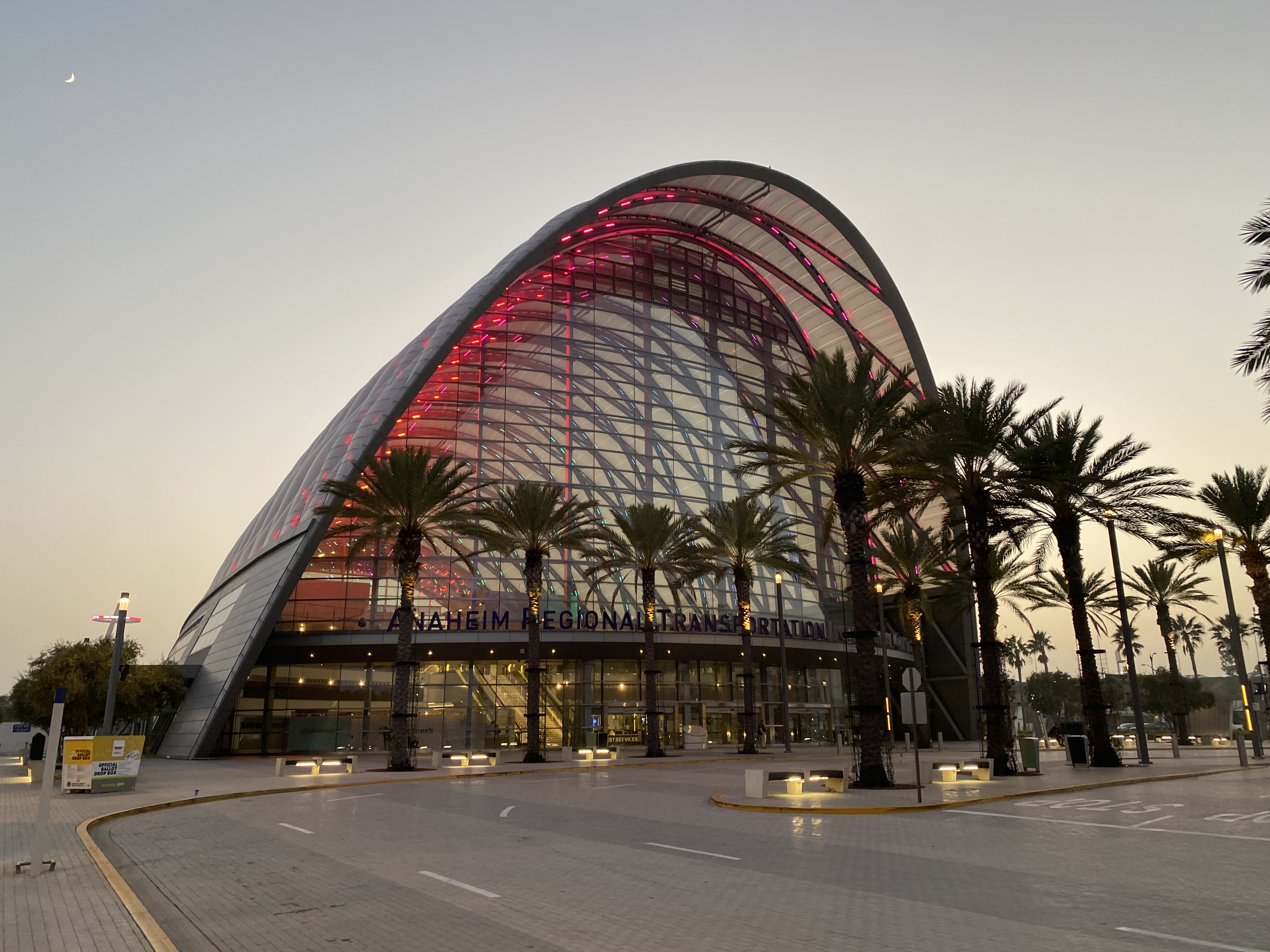
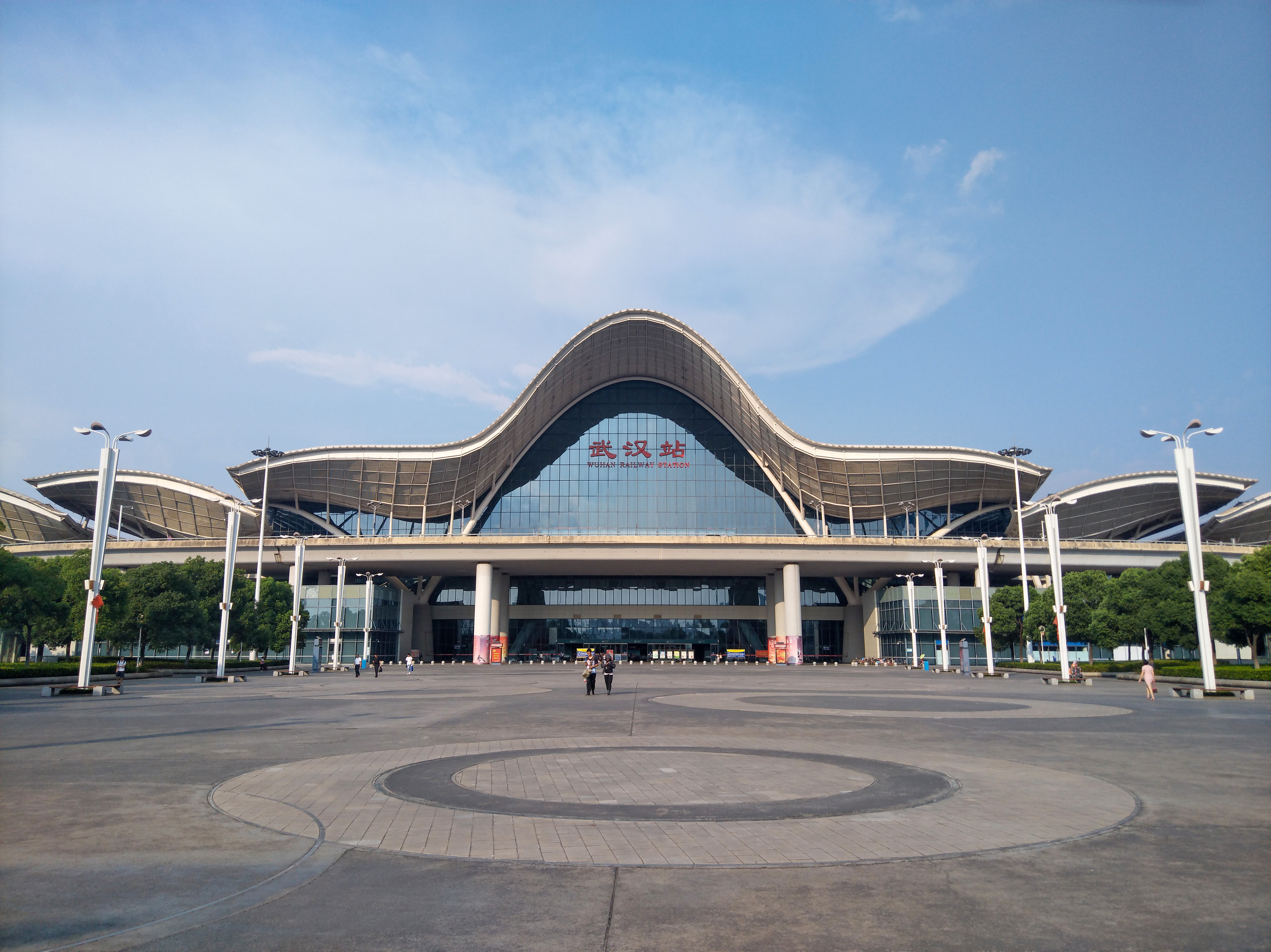
The Anaheim Station (left) represented the visually similar Wuhan Station (right) for the episodes set in locked-down China.

The series resumed filming under strict health security protocols on October 27, 2020, after nearly three months of preparations. The entire season had to be filmed in Southern California in accordance to then-active quarantine regulations, and some cities such as Beverly Hills and Pasadena were unavailable due to their own restrictions. To film exterior shots of New York City, production designer Nelson Coates placed the city's iconic taxis and other signature elements in Downtown Los Angeles, where he also shot scenes set in the French Quarter of New Orleans. A subplot taking place in Wuhan, the origin of SARS-CoV-2, was filmed in Anaheim, particularly because its transit center shared architectural and infrastructural similarities with Wuhan Station. Two principal locations were used for the Italian side story: the Los Angeles Plaza and some of its buildings, including the Pico House, were redesigned to serve as Piazza Cavour in Como, while Mitch's residence was based in Villa del Sol d'Oro in Sierra Madre. An event space for Alverno Heights Academy, the villa was featured in several films, including Legally Blonde, where Witherspoon played Elle Woods. The interior of the building was decorated with furniture and textures from different periods for a better resemblace with the lifestyle of Italy. Computer graphics and drone units were equipped to place the villa on a peninsula adjacent to Lake Como, as well as to film winter scenes of Maine and the 2020 Times Square Ball for the first episode. Filming concluded in May 2021.

On July 26, 2021, the production team accused Chubb Limited of insurance fraud. It was claimed that the insurance provider manipulated its policies to count losses incurred during the delays not as "direct physical loss or damage", resulting in $43 million being undercompensated. The lawsuit was dismiseed on September 9, 2022, after no justification of equating viruses to direct physical damage was introduced by the plaintiffs.

=== Casting ===
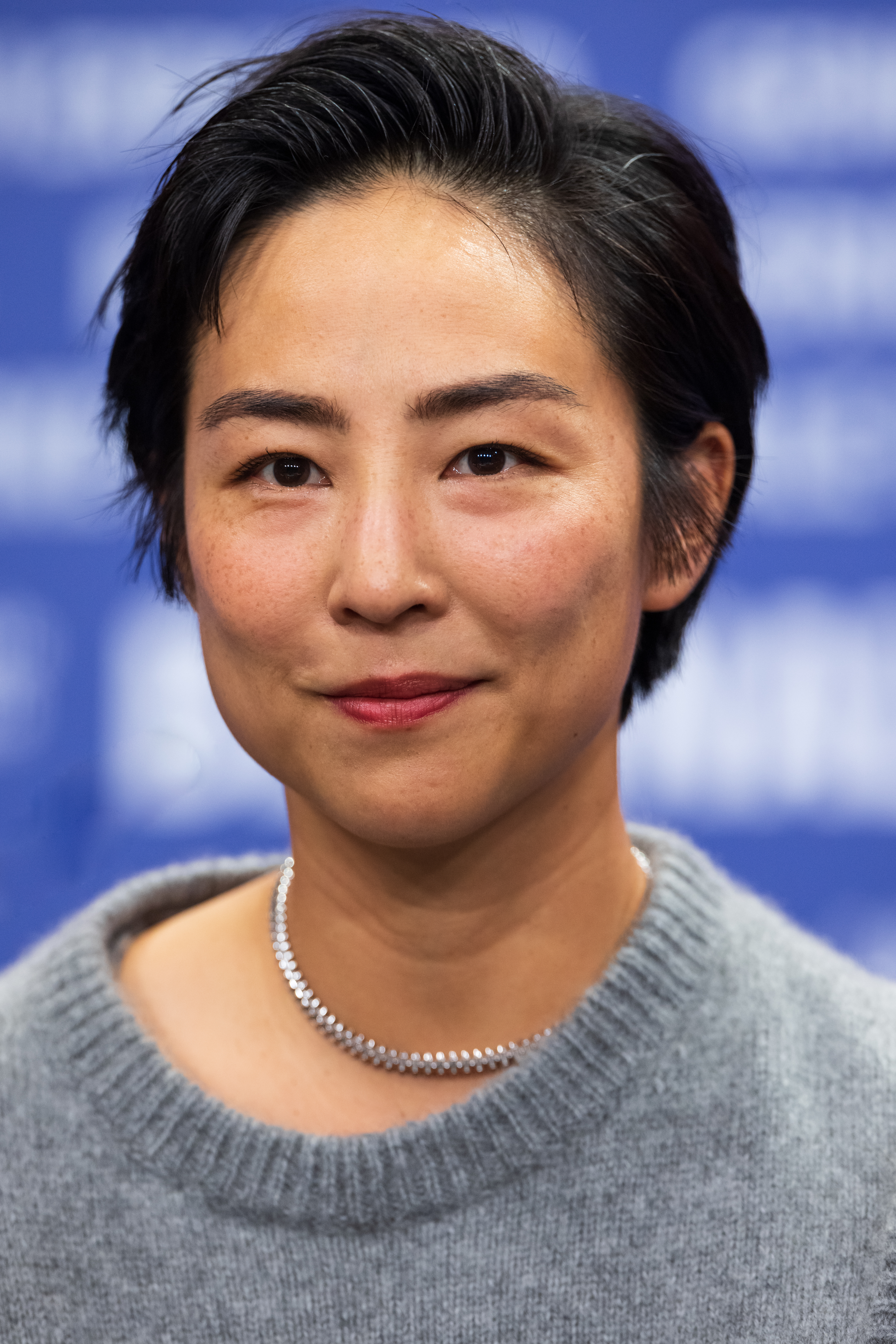
The second season introduced Stella Bak, played by Greta Lee.

All cast members were expected to return for the series, except Steve Carell, whose one-year contract with Apple had expired. After the first season concluded, Ehrin told The Hollywood Reporter that she was exploring his potential return. On October 9, 2020, it was announced that Carell would have a main role in the season. His story arc has been described as "exploring the gray area", which is the fate of disgraced celebrities. In total, he appeared in six episodes throughout the season, of which La Amara Vita marked his final appearance on the series. Gugu Mbatha-Raw, Bel Powley and Jack Davenport didn't return to the series after the first season, although Powley made a guest appearance in the ninth episode.

Julianna Margulies joined the series on December 2, 2020, as a "veteran broadcast journalist" Laura Peterson, debuting in the episode "Laura". She was expected to "upset the balance" between lead actresses Jennifer Aniston and Reese Witherspoon, as well as to complement Witherspoon's storylines. The season also introduced two characters from the era of new media, a fresh Head of News Division Stella Bak, played by Greta Lee, and UBA's social media consultant Ty Fitzgerald, played by Ruairi O'Connor. Stella was modeled after Ehrin's initial conception of the company's CEO before the role went to Billy Crudup in the first season. In addition, Hasan Minhaj appeared in a recurring capacity as Bradley's co-host on The Morning Show.

=== Marketing and release ===
On June 14, 2021, Apple released a teaser trailer for the season, followed by a full-length trailer on August 23. The first episode premiered on September 17, 2021, with new episodes released every Friday until November 19. On January 10, 2022, the series was renewed for a third season.

== Reception ==
=== Critical response ===
The second season of The Morning Show received mixed reviews from critics. On the review aggregator Rotten Tomatoes, 67% of 52 reviews were positive, with an average rating of 6.5/10, while 60% of 25 reviews were positive on Metacritic, indicating 'mixed or average reviews'. Adrian Horton of The Guardian called it "the most compelling mess on TV", a sentiment shared by multiple critics as the persistent lack of coherent storylines and a series of unjustified decisions often contrasted with melodramatic tone and choreographic elegance that kept the series "captivating" and "absolutely, positively never quite boring". As with the first season, storytelling was heavily criticized for relying excessively on dramatic confrontations at the expense of depth and direction. The reviewers noted that while the season became more topical than the first, it failed to explore any issue in detail or express authorial intent, and that an "unsettling" pandemic backdrop only further complicated the plot. Writing for The Washington Post, Inkoo Kang called the timeline "the most confounding creative choice of the season", while others found that it managed to reflect the volatile reality of that period. Critical acclaim went to pacing, visual components and production quality, and reviewers agreed that, if not taken seriously, the season is mostly "fun", "entertaining" and "compulsive". Sophie Gilbert of The Atlantic described it as "a feast of high camp and late capitalism" where "the disconnect between its presentation and its quality is the most striking thing".

Jennifer Aniston and Billy Crudup's performance was highly praised, with Adam White of The Independent considering Aniston's role to be "her carreer best" and "the only area of consistency". Meanwhile, Reese Witherspoon's Bradley Jackson was described as "out-of-character", and some of the critics longed for more scenes of her and Aniston together. The addition of Julianna Margulies and Greta Lee to the cast was warmly welcomed, although the latter was described as "mute" and "poweless". Critics remained unsure over Steve Carell's side story, stating that it was mostly redundant and distracting. Chicago Tribune's Nina Metz wondered why "the show would rather spend time rehabilitating Mitch in Lake Como than give Karen Pittman, Desean Terry, or especially Shari Belafonte substantial storylines", seeing how much they were reduced. Following Mitch's death, Daniel d'Addario attributed "profound unseiousness" in handling the series' subject matter after it failed to solve the sexual predator dilemmas it set in the first season. Other recurring cast members, including Mark Duplass, Holland Taylor, Valeria Golino, Janina Gavankar and Mindy Kaling, were described as "wasted" since all of their storylines were left significantly undeveloped.

=== Accolades ===
The second season of The Morning Show didn't win any major accolades despite receiving 18 nominations. Witherspoon, Crudup and Marcia Gay Harden were nominated for Primetime Emmy Awards and Primetime Creative Arts Emmy Awards for Outstanding Lead Actress, Outstanding Supporting Actor and Outstanding Guest Actress in a drama series, respectively. Previously, it was remarked that the overlong monologues throughout the season are favorable in contention for accolades.

Year	Award	Category	Recipient(s)	Result	Ref.
2022	Art Directors Guild Awards	Excellence in Production Design - One Hour Contemporary Single-Camera Series	Nelson Coates	Nominated	
2022	Cinema Audio Society Awards	Outstanding Achievement in Sound Mixing for Television Series – One Hour	William B. Kaplan, Elmo Ponsdomenech, Jason "Frenchie" Gaya, Carter Burwell, Brian Smith, and James Howe (for "My Least Favorite Year")	Nominated	
2022	Critics' Choice Television Awards	Best Supporting Actor in a Drama Series	Billy Crudup	Nominated	
2022	Golden Globe Awards	Best Television Series – Drama	The Morning Show	Nominated	
2022	Golden Globe Awards	Best Actress in a Television Series – Drama	Jennifer Aniston	Nominated	
2022	Golden Globe Awards	Best Supporting Actor – Television	Billy Crudup	Nominated	
2022	Golden Globe Awards	Best Supporting Actor – Television	Mark Duplass	Nominated	
2022	Golden Reel Awards	Outstanding Achievement in Sound Editing – Series 1 Hour – Dialogue / ADR	Mark Relyea, Julie Altus, Robert Guastini, and Pernell Salinas (for "My Least Favorite Year")	Nominated	
2022	Hollywood Critics Association TV Awards	Best Streaming Series, Drama	The Morning Show	Nominated	
2022	Hollywood Critics Association TV Awards	Best Actress in a Streaming Series, Drama	Jennifer Aniston	Nominated	
2022	Hollywood Critics Association TV Awards	Best Actress in a Streaming Series, Drama	Reese Witherspoon	Nominated	
2022	Hollywood Critics Association TV Awards	Best Supporting Actor in a Streaming Series, Drama	Billy Crudup	Nominated	
2022	Hollywood Critics Association TV Awards	Best Writing in a Streaming Series, Drama	Kerry Ehrin and Scott Troy (for "La Amara Vita")	Nominated	
2022	Primetime Emmy Awards	Outstanding Lead Actress in a Drama Series	Reese Witherspoon (for "Confirmations")	Nominated	
2022	Primetime Emmy Awards	Outstanding Supporting Actor in a Drama Series	Billy Crudup (for "My Least Favorite Year")	Nominated	
2022	Primetime Creative Arts Emmy Awards	Outstanding Guest Actress in a Drama Series	Marcia Gay Harden (for "Testimony")	Nominated	
2022	Producers Guild of America Awards	Outstanding Producer of Episodic Television – Drama	The Morning Show	Nominated	
2022	Screen Actors Guild Awards	Outstanding Performance by a Male Actor in a Drama Series	Billy Crudup	Nominated	
2022	Screen Actors Guild Awards	Outstanding Performance by a Female Actor in a Drama Series	Jennifer Aniston	Nominated	
2022	Screen Actors Guild Awards	Outstanding Performance by a Female Actor in a Drama Series	Reese Witherspoon	Nominated	
2022	Screen Actors Guild Awards	Outstanding Performance by an Ensemble in a Drama Series	Jennifer Aniston, Shari Belafonte, Eli Bildner, Néstor Carbonell, Steve Carell, Billy Crudup, Mark Duplass, Amber Friendly, Janina Gavankar, Valeria Golino, Tara Karsian, Hannah Leder, Greta Lee, Julianna Margulies, Joe Marinelli, Michelle Meredith, Ruairi O'Connor, Joe Pacheco, Karen Pittman, Victoria Tate, Desean Terry, and Reese Witherspoon	Nominated	
2022	Writers Guild of America Awards	Dramatic Series	Jeff Augustin, Brian Chamberlayne, Kerry Ehrin, Kristen Layden, Erica Lipez, Justin Matthews, Adam Milch, Stacy Osei-Kuffour, Torrey Speer, Scott Troy, Ali Vingiano	Nominated	
2022	Writers Guild of America Awards	Episodic Drama	Kerry Ehrin & Scott Troy (for "La Amara Vita")	Nominated	
