= The Morning Show season 1 =

Season of American drama television series

The Morning Show
- Season 1
- Promotional poster
- Showrunners: Jay Carson; Kerry Ehrin
- Starring: Jennifer Aniston; Reese Witherspoon; Billy Crudup; Mark Duplass; Gugu Mbatha-Raw; Néstor Carbonell; Karen Pittman; Desean Terry; Bel Powley; Jack Davenport; Steve Carell
- No. of episodes: 10

Release
- Original network: Apple TV+
- Original release: November 1 – December 20, 2019

Season chronology
- Next → Season 2

The first season of The Morning Show, (Note: also known as Morning Wars) an American drama television series, premiered as a launch title for Apple TV+ on November 1, 2019, and ended on December 20, 2019. Developed by Kerry Ehrin with expert support from Brian Stelter, it features an ensemble cast led by Jennifer Aniston, Reese Witherspoon, Steve Carell and Billy Crudup. Original showrunner and series creator Jay Carson departed the series before filming on the first season started. Mimi Leder, Michael Ellenberg, Ehrin, Aniston and Witherspoon served as executive producers.

Set in 2019 in the New York City, the season follows a fictional broadcast media network UBA and its popular morning television program The Morning Show (often referred to as TMS) hosted by Alex Levy (Aniston) and Mitch Kessler (Carell). In the first three episodes, Mitch is displaced from UBA following anonymous allegations of sexual harassment from a member of the crew, while Alex is paired with a new co-anchor, a fiery and committed field reporter Bradley Jackson (Witherspoon). The following episodes show the events of the first three weeks following Mitch's departure, which evokes multiple conflicts across UBA and TMS and exposes the flaws of the corporation and its workers.

The season received mixed reviews by critics, who praised the cast's performance and filming techniques but commented on the lack of coherent and purposeful storyline. However, it received the streaming service's first-ever accolades, with Crudup winning a Primetime Emmy Award and a Critics' Choice Award. A second season, taking place one year after the season finale, premiered in September 2021.

== Cast and characters ==
Cast of the first season (from left to right): Bel Powley, Néstor Carbonell, Janina Gavankar, Desean Terry, Jennifer Aniston, Mark Duplass, Steve Carell, Reese Witherspoon, Karen Pittman, Billy Crudup and Gugu Mbatha-Raw.

=== Main ===
- Jennifer Aniston as Alex Levy, the prominent host of The Morning Show. Working together with Mitch Kessler for over 15 years, she became known as "the mother of morning television" and brought the program its fandom. She wishes to gain respect and increased control over TMS, while UBA executives are secretly planning to retire her because of age concerns and consistent viewership decrease.
- Reese Witherspoon as Bradley Jackson, a field reporter from Virginia who replaces Mitch on The Morning Show. A person of fiery temper, she often confronts Alex and disrupts order at the show. This is the only season Bradley appears brunette; her hair color is changed to blonde starting from the second season.
- Billy Crudup as Cory Elisson, the newly appointed Director of the News Division of UBA. He is opportunistic and charismatic, but neither Alex nor other members of TMS trust him. He becomes a close friend to Bradley, whom he personally supports during breakdowns.
- Mark Duplass as Charles "Chip" Black, a quirky executive producer whose career is repeatedly put under threat by Bradley's actions.
- Gugu Mbatha-Raw as Hannah Shoenfeld, a promising talent booker who initiated the interview with Bradley on The Morning Show. She was one of Mitch's harassed victims and, after receiving a promotion intended to silence her, sent an anonymous letter incriminating Mitch of his actions.
- Néstor Carbonell as Yanko Flores, lead weatherman at TMS who has a secret romantic relationship with Claire.
- Karen Pittman as Mia Jordan, a seasoned producer of the show who works with newcomer Bradley. She is later revealed to have had an affair with Mitch to secure her promotion and becomes a subject of widespread gossips. She refrains from accusing Mitch, unlike other crew members, and is trying to prove her worth to end speculations against her.
- Desean Terry as Daniel Henderson, host of the weekend edition of TMS who is seeking for a promotion and is backed by Chip to take over Mitch's seat. When Bradley is announced as Alex's new co-host, he stays loyal to the show and reluctantly retains his position.
- Bel Powley as Claire Conway, a young production assistant from a wealthy and powerful family. Powley describes her character as a "third-wave feminist" whose relationships are defined through a wider conflict at TMS.
- Jack Davenport as Jason Craig, Alex's supportive husband who takes care of their daughter Lizzie while she attends college.
- Steve Carell as Mitch Kessler, Alex's former co-host who was terminated after several anonymous accusations of sexual misconduct. He denies the allegations throughout the season and struggles to get his job and reputation back.

=== Recurring ===
- Tom Irwin as Fred Micklen, the authoritarian President of UBA. He is skeptical of Cory's and Alex's approaches and seeks to turn their moves against them and Chip. He also becomes the target of Mitch, having previously covered up his affairs with crew members.
- Kate Vernon as Geneva Micklen, a member of the fictional New York Theater Fund and Fred's wife.
- Joe Tippett as Hal Jackson, Bradley's brother who is a confessed drug addict.
- Embeth Davidtz as Paige Kessler, Mitch's wife who divorces him in the first episode.
- Martin Short as Dick Lundry, a disgraced movie director who had faced and admitted similar accusations as his friend Mitch.
- Marcia Gay Harden as Maggie Brener, a conceited yet reputable journalist from New York Magazine.
- Mindy Kaling as Audra Khatri, a glossy morning news anchor at YDA, the fictional rival company, who is pushing Daniel to quit TMS and become her co-host.
- Oona Roche as Lizzy Craig, the daughter of Alex and Jason.

==== Crew members ====
- Victoria Tate as Rena Robinson, Chip's assistant
- Hannah Leder as Isabella, a production assistant
- Roman Mitichyan as Sam Rudo
- Joe Marinelli as Donny Spagnoli, a director
- Ian Gomez as Greg, a director
- Janina Gavankar as Alison Namazi, Daniel's co-host of the weekend edition
- Shari Belafonte as Julia, a floor manager
- Ahna O'Reilly as Ashely Brown, a former audio engineer and Mitch's accuser
- Eli Bildner as Joel Rapkin
- Amber Friendly as Layla Bell, a producer
- Joe Pacheco as Bart Daley
- Michelle Meredith as Lindsey Sherman
- Andrea Bendewald as Valérie
- Augustus Prew as Sean, a producer
- Katherine Ko as Dhillon Reece-Smit
- David Magidoff as Nicky Brooks, a producer

== Episodes ==
No. overall	No. in season	Title	Directed by	Written by	Original release date
1	1	"In the Dark Night of the Soul It's Always 3:30 in the Morning"	Mimi Leder	Kerry Ehrin and Jay Carson	November 1, 2019
The Morning Show, a popular news and talk morning television show on UBA, is thrown into chaos when co-anchor Mitch Kessler is fired amid allegations of sexual misconduct. His co-anchor Alex Levy is furious at the network for keeping her in the dark and later meets with Mitch, who reveals the network has been planning on replacing her. Elsewhere, young "conservative" reporter Bradley Jackson becomes an internet viral sensation after a video of her angrily fact-checking a coal mine supporter at a protest is posted on social media. Bradley quits her local network following a confrontation with her boss, and, after an argument with her family, is asked to appear on The Morning Show for an interview by the show's head booker Hannah. Alex is skeptical about Bradley's claim that she was unaware of being filmed and presses her during the interview, but Bradley pushes back and doesn't give in. Network CEO Cory Ellison is impressed and later calls Bradley to ask her to meet with him so they can discuss her future.
2	2	"A Seat at the Table"	Mimi Leder	Teleplay by : Kerry Ehrin; Story by : Kerry Ehrin and Jay Carson	November 1, 2019
Cory arranges a meeting for Bradley with the show's executive producer, Chip Black, to see if she might become a field correspondent. Chip's dismissive manner causes Bradley to lambast him, leaving her sure she has ruined her chances of getting the job. In the middle of a meeting for contract negotiations, and knowing the network needs her to stabilize the show after Mitch's departure, Alex tries to leverage the situation to get all of her demands, including co-host approval. Yanko Flores, the show's meteorologist, is pursuing a secret relationship with production assistant Claire, but they are hesitant to reveal their relationship due to Mitch's recent controversies. Cory continues to use an unwitting Bradley to stir things up by getting her to come to an awards event honoring Alex and seating the women next to each other. In the lobby, Cory scoffs when Alex demands co-host approval and calls her bluff when she threatens to leave the show. In retaliation, Alex goes rogue during her speech and takes things into her own hands by announcing Bradley as her new co-host, much to the shock of everyone in attendance.
3	3	"Chaos Is the New Cocaine"	David Frankel	Erica Lipez	November 1, 2019
The staff of The Morning Show are in turmoil over the announcement. Cory has told the press that Bradley will debut the following Monday; as the team prepares to work all weekend to get her ready for the broadcast, Alex arrives to assert some control over the proceedings, while a frustrated Bradley remains undecided over accepting the position. TMS producer Mia Jordan asks Chip to assign her as Bradley's producer, and announces her new role before he has even offered it to her. Forced to go along with Alex's announcement or lose face, network president Fred Micklen is furious, but Cory reacts differently; he tells Fred to look at Bradley as an opportunity to reinvent the show and eventually be rid of Alex like they wanted. During Bradley's first camera tests, people question her initial wardrobe, and she challenges the copy Mia has provided her. Cory gets to know Bradley as they pick out a new wardrobe for her. Fred summons Alex to browbeat her in front of a room of network executives, but she boldly informs him that he lost power over the show long ago, and from now on they will be doing things her way.
4	4	"That Woman"	Lynn Shelton	Adam Milch	November 8, 2019
Bradley makes her debut on The Morning Show but, chafing at the rosy scripted persona the show has given her, decides to mention her personal struggles growing up, including having an abortion as a teenager. This revelation incites controversy and infuriates Fred, but it also galvanizes the younger, pro-choice audience. Meanwhile, an internal investigation is launched by the company's human resources department into Mitch's conduct, with most of the crew backing Mitch and denying knowledge of his sexual misconduct, although Mia reveals that she had an affair with Mitch a few years prior. Alex is convinced to give up the Friday interview with one of Mitch's accusers to Bradley, but when Bradley goes off-script, the accuser reveals more than the producers had planned, disclosing that the staff was aware of Mitch's behavior. Afterwards, Alex angrily confronts Bradley for her actions, but Bradley accuses her of knowing about Mitch's misconduct.
5	5	"No One's Gonna Harm You, Not While I'm Around"	David Frankel	Torrey Speer	November 15, 2019
The Morning Show braces itself for the upcoming story from The New York Times (NYT) on Mitch's behavior, leading him to crash the studio and beg his former coworkers to speak on the record in his defense. His pleas fall on deaf ears and security escorts him out. When the weekend hits, Alex hosts a charity fundraiser, which seemingly goes well, but she is thrown by talk of Bradley's success and Cory's proposal that they collaborate, leading her to seek solace from Mitch. Meanwhile, Bradley tries to bond with her coworkers by going out to celebrate Claire's birthday at a bar, only for the night to get heated as talk eventually turns to Mitch. After receiving a phone call from her estranged father, Bradley has sex with a bartender, and later gets Cory to help her return to her hotel room. After the NYT story hits, Mitch is enraged that Fred has ceased defending his actions and vows revenge.
6	6	"The Pendulum Swings"	Tucker Gates	Kristen Layden	November 22, 2019
The Morning Show travels to California to cover the wildfires engulfing the state. Alex struggles on and off screen as she is still angry at Bradley for accusing her of covering for Mitch and is devastated by her estranged husband Jason's decision to officially divorce. After breaking down on screen, Alex is comforted by Bradley and the two reconcile, with Alex opening up about the divorce and Bradley talking about her alcoholic father. Fearing for his job, Chip suggests he could be an ally in helping Cory take over from Fred, leading Cory to suggest that Chip should come to him when he has real dirt on Fred. Hannah accompanies Claire in securing a survivor for the show and offers her professional advice, which helps an inspired Claire land a promotion as Bradley's assistant. Later, Hannah catches Claire sneaking into Yanko's room to celebrate.
7	7	"Open Waters"	Roxann Dawson	Jeff Augustin	November 29, 2019
Alex and Jason tell their daughter, Lizzy, that they are getting a divorce. Lizzy blames Alex for prioritizing her job over her family, leading Alex to scold Lizzy for not appreciating anything she did for her. Alex's PR team warns her that news of the divorce could damage her career, causing her to lean on Bradley for support. Yanko and Claire are called to HR and decide to come clean about their relationship, a decision that relieves Yanko but leaves Claire wondering if her job is on the line. After a member of the production team makes an inappropriate remark about Mia which gets him fired, Mia has a meltdown and confirms to the entire studio that she was involved with Mitch. Bradley contemplates an offer from Mitch about interviewing him on air to reveal that the network was involved in covering for him. After promising he can get a witness to corroborate his story, Mitch visits Hannah, who he believes exchanged sexual favors for a promotion from him.
8	8	"Lonely at the Top"	Michelle MacLaren	JC Lee	December 6, 2019
In a flashback to 2017, Mitch stresses over turning 50. Now that his affair with Mia has recently ended, Mitch has Chip remove her from his team and place her with Alex, who the network is considering replacing due to tanking ratings. The cast and crew of The Morning Show surprise Mitch with a huge birthday party at the studio, where Claire meets Yanko for the first time. As the party winds down, Hannah begins to see reports of the 2017 Las Vegas shooting breaking on Twitter. Mitch and Alex travel to Vegas to cover the shooting; Mitch asks Chip to bring Hannah, still only a junior booker, along with the team. Alex and Mitch struggle emotionally with the reporting. When Mitch cannot sleep, he heads out to a memorial and runs into a distressed Hannah. They return to Mitch's hotel room, where he kisses and rapes her. Upon returning to New York, Hannah barges into Fred's office; he stops her before she can report the incident and promotes her to head booker to buy her silence. She accepts the offer in shock and disappointment.
9	9	"Play the Queen"	Kevin Bray	Erica Lipez & Ali Vingiano	December 13, 2019
Bradley reveals to Alex that she wants to go forward with interviewing Mitch in order to take down Fred. After Alex takes the news badly, both women begin to work behind the scenes to get what they want; Bradley turns to Cory for backing while Alex secretly approaches Fred to work out a plan for getting rid of Bradley. Daniel, the weekend co-host of TMS, agrees to help Alex in hopes of taking Bradley's position. Hannah reveals to Claire that she was the one who reported them to HR, causing them to fall out and Claire to loudly declare her love for Yanko. The strain of public scrutiny, however, proves to be too much for Claire and she breaks up with him. Hannah confronts Mitch about how powerless she felt during their sexual encounter only for him to berate her for her naiveté. Hannah reluctantly agrees to corroborate how Fred enabled her promotion, but wants to remain anonymous. A heartbroken Chip, who learned that Alex was willing to get rid of him as part of a pact with Fred, agrees to help Cory and Bradley in producing the Mitch interview.
10	10	"The Interview"	Mimi Leder	Kerry Ehrin	December 20, 2019
After Mitch reveals that Hannah will corroborate his side of the story, Bradley meets with Hannah, who breaks down while recalling Mitch's sexual assault. She asks Bradley to not reveal her identity and to wait until she accepts a new job offer at UBA in Los Angeles before doing the interview with Mitch. Aware that moves are being made behind the scenes to expose his knowledge and cover-up of sexual misconduct, Fred grants Alex co-host approval in order to gain her support in firing Chip. Chip convinces his assistant Rena to help him smuggle Mitch into The Morning Show to do the interview live and on air after telling her that he has been fired. Claire, trying to make amends with Hannah, shows up at her apartment and discovers her dead from an overdose. News of her death shocks everyone, resulting in Bradley calling off the interview and a physical fight between Chip and Mitch in the lobby of Mitch’s apartment. While on air, Alex snaps and along with Bradley, exposes Fred and UBA for the creation of a toxic culture that permitted sexual harassment. The feed is cut off as Bradley encourages more people to speak out.

== Production ==
=== Development ===
On November 8, 2017, it was reported that Apple ordered a full 10-episode season of an untitled morning show drama series. Together with the remake of Amazing Stories, it was one of the first original series acquired by the company. Jennifer Aniston, Reese Witherspoon, Jay Carson and Michael Ellenberg were set to executive produce the series, with Carson also serving as a lead writer. On April 4, 2018, five months after the series order, Carson left the production team and Kerry Ehrin was appointed as a showrunner and a lead writer for the series. She reworked the entire script for the season from scratch, restraining from on-site research in order to fit in previously set production deadlines. On July 11, 2018, Mimi Leder was announced to direct and executive produce the series.

=== Themes ===
At the moment of announcement, the series was set to explore the challenges faced by the workers on morning television, with additional input provided by journalist Brian Stelter. However, the fall of 2017 saw the rise of MeToo movement and a wave of sexual abuse lawsuits against media personalities, most notably Harvey Weinstein and Today host Matt Lauer. In light of these events, it was decided to pivot the initial conception and instead focus on the experience of women in the workplace. This required reassembling the writing team and searching for a female head writer who could provide personal expertise and create an authentic presentation.

When Ehrin pitched her concept for the series, she planned to devote the entire season to exploring the #MeToo movement and its aspects from multiple perspectives. Most female characters represent feminists of different levels of involvement and views on power, working relationships, and personal identity. Nevertheless, the producers aimed to preserve a balance between opposing viewpoints. The male co-anchor was envisioned as a composite character based on television anchors and other celebrities exposed as sexual predators in 2017; Ehrin specifically wanted him to look "likeable", hence casting Steve Carell for the role. Ehrin told the Los Angeles Times that she was more interested in telling the story of a character rather than in modeling him after a specific real-life person.

=== Casting and filming ===
Jennifer Aniston and Reese Witherspoon were confirmed to star in lead roles during the announcement of series order, marking Aniston's first role on television since the conclusion of Friends in 2004. Almost a year later, in a series of announcements made between October 23 and 26, 2018, it was revealed that Carell, Billy Crudup, Gugu Mbatha-Raw, Mark Duplass and Néstor Carbonell joined the series. On November 7, 2018, Karen Pittman, Bel Powley and Desean Terry officially joined the cast in regular roles. In March 2019, Deadline Hollywood reported that Jack Davenport would also star in the series, becoming the last addition to the main cast.

Filming for the series started on October 29, 2018, and concluded in May 2019. Despite the series being set in New York City, a relatively small number of scenes were shot there, while most of the season was filmed in Los Angeles. Apple and the producers avoided publicity and shared no details throughout the filming aiming for no on-set disruptions and plot leaks.

=== Marketing and release ===
The series was announced as part of Apple TV+ original series lineup on Apple Special Event on March 25, 2019. It was revealed on stage by Aniston, Witherspoon and Carell, who shared the new title and premise for the season. On August 19, 2019, Apple released a full-length official trailer for the series.

During the Apple Event held on September 10, 2019, it was announced that Apple TV+ would launch on November 1, 2019. On October 28, 2019, the series premiered globally on a close screening at Lincoln Center in New York, which was attended by principal cast members as well as Apple CEO Tim Cook. The first three episodes were available with the launch of the service, while the remaining seven were released every Friday until December 20, 2019. The release coincided with the publication of Ronan Farrow's book Catch and Kill which further exposed Weinstein, Lauer and other sexual predators and revived interest to the topic.

== Reception ==
=== Critical response ===
The first three episodes received mixed reviews from critics. On review aggregator Rotten Tomatoes, 62% of 107 reviews from critics were positive with an average rating of 5.9/10. On Metacritic, the season reached a score of 61%, indicating "generally favorable" reviews. Critics lauded Aniston's performance, with Richard Lawson of Vanity Fair writing that "her anger commingling with sadness is compelling", while she also "reads correctly as a morning show anchor, calibrating that certain studio-lit warmth bordered by crisp professionalism just right". Other members of the ensemble cast, particularly Crudup, were praised as well, although some scenes featuring Witherspoon were found to be weak. Critics gave credit to Leder and the production team for set design and dynamic pacing.

However, the season received heavy criticism for incoherent storyline and meaningless dialogues that disrupted the narration. Otherwise "boring", the plot was found to lack a clear sense of direction while often relying on implausible plot twists to push the story. Carell's portrayal of Mitch was 'unclear' to several writers, who felt the series was trying to "downplay his offence", though his acting received critical acclaim. Critics felt that the season tried to deal with multiple broad topics at once, thereby leaving fewer opportunities to properly deliver the underlying message as well as represent the environment of morning television. Emily van der Werff of Vox wrote that the show was "fundamentally at war with itself", as its themes often contrasted with each other. It was therefore considered that the show couldn’t fully unleash its potential and, despite its high budget and heavy marketing campaign, would draw less viewers to Apple TV+ then initially stipulated. In a follow-up press tour, Leder responded to negative reviewers, claiming that the backlash around the series "was really blown out of proportion" and that the creative team welcomed "constructive criticism".

As the season progressed, the reviews started to improve. Some noted that the season became increasingly engaging thanks to its elements of vanity and 'campy' feel. Some critics, including The Guardian's Stuart Heritage and Forbes' Linda Maleh, provided a more optimistic look on the season in their later reviews. Maleh wrote that it's "honestly hilarious much of the time" watching "fictional people on our TV screen be extra-dramatic in response to everything", comparing the series to early seasons of Succession. Similar thoughts were shared by Heritage, who found it "funnier than it should be, more kinetic than it should be, much, much weirder than it has any right to be". In a review for Los Angeles Times, Robert Lloyd ascribed this effect to the cast consisting primarily of actors with backgrounds in comedy rather than drama.

=== Accolades ===
At the Critic' Choice Awards, Billy Crudup was nominated for and later won Best Supporting Actor in a Drama Series which would become the first major accolade won by an Apple TV+ original series. In addition, the season received three nominations for 77th Golden Globe Awards as well as three more nominations for 26th Screen Actors Guild Awards (one of them, Outstanding Performance by a Female Actor in a Drama Series, was won by Aniston) in December 2019. This made Apple TV+ the first streaming service to receive recognition from major academic institutions in the launch year.

In 2020, at 72nd Primetime Emmy Awards, the season received five nominations including first recognitions in drama for Aniston and Carell. However, the only Emmy was won by Crudup in Outstanding Supporting Actor in a Drama Series category. Additionally, the season won two accolades at the Newport Beach Film Festival (for Bel Powley and Gugu Mbatha-Raw) and earned a ReFrame Stamp for creating opportunities for women in different areas of production.

Year	Award	Category	Recipient(s)	Result	Ref.
2020	Black Reel Television Awards	Outstanding Supporting Actress, Drama Series	Gugu Mbatha-Raw	Nominated	
2020	Critics' Choice Television Awards	Best Supporting Actor in a Drama Series	Billy Crudup	Won	
2020	Dorian Awards	Best Supporting TV Performance – Actor	Billy Crudup	Nominated	
2020	Golden Globe Awards	Best Television Series – Drama	The Morning Show	Nominated	
2020	Golden Globe Awards	Best Actress in a Television Series – Drama	Jennifer Aniston	Nominated	
2020	Golden Globe Awards	Best Actress in a Television Series – Drama	Reese Witherspoon	Nominated	
2020	Newport Beach Film Festival	Breakout Honoree	Bel Powley	Won	
2020	Newport Beach Film Festival	Artist of Distinction	Gugu Mbatha-Raw	Won	
2020	Primetime Emmy Awards	Outstanding Lead Actor in a Drama Series	Steve Carell (for "Lonely at the Top")	Nominated	
2020	Primetime Emmy Awards	Outstanding Lead Actress in a Drama Series	Jennifer Aniston (for "In the Dark Night of the Soul It's Always 3:30 in the Morning")	Nominated	
2020	Primetime Emmy Awards	Outstanding Supporting Actor in a Drama Series	Billy Crudup (for "Chaos is the New Cocaine")	Won	
2020	Primetime Emmy Awards	Outstanding Supporting Actor in a Drama Series	Mark Duplass (for "The Interview")	Nominated	
2020	Primetime Emmy Awards	Outstanding Directing for a Drama Series	Mimi Leder (for "The Interview")	Nominated	
2020	Primetime Creative Arts Emmy Awards	Outstanding Guest Actor in a Drama Series	Martin Short (for "Chaos is the New Cocaine")	Nominated	
2020	Primetime Creative Arts Emmy Awards	Outstanding Main Title Design	Angus Wall, Hazel Baird, Emanuele Marani, EJ Kang, Peter Murphy and Erik Righetti	Nominated	
2020	Primetime Creative Arts Emmy Awards	Outstanding Production Design for a Narrative Contemporary Program (One Hour or More)	John Paino, James F. Truesdale and Amy Wells (for "In the Dark Night of the Soul It's Always 3:30 in the Morning")	Nominated	
2020	The ReFrame Stamp	Top 100 Popular Television (2019–2020)	The Morning Show (season 1)	Included	
2020	Screen Actors Guild Awards	Outstanding Performance by a Male Actor in a Drama Series	Steve Carell	Nominated	
2020	Screen Actors Guild Awards	Outstanding Performance by a Male Actor in a Drama Series	Billy Crudup	Nominated	
2020	Screen Actors Guild Awards	Outstanding Performance by a Female Actor in a Drama Series	Jennifer Aniston	Won	
2020	Television Critics' Association Awards	Outstanding New Program	The Morning Show	Nominated	
2021	Artios Awards	Outstanding Achievement in Casting – Television Pilot and First Season – Drama	Victoria Thomas	Nominated	
2021	AARP Movies for Grownups Awards	Best Actress – Television	Jennifer Aniston	Nominated	
