= That Woman =

That Woman may refer to:

- That Woman (1922 film), American silent drama film
- That Woman (2003 film), French drama film
- That Woman (The Morning Show), an episode of the American television series The Morning Show
- That Woman, the solo music project of Josephine Vander West, singer, songwriter and producer of the English alt-pop duo Oh Wonder
- "That woman", appositive by which Monica Lewinsky was referred to in 1998 by then President Bill Clinton during a press conference denying their relationship
