= A Private Person =

- The Morning Show episode
- Episode no.: Season 2 Episode 6
- Directed by: Rachel Morrison
- Written by: Torrey Speer; Stacy Osei-Kuffour
- Cinematography by: Jeffrey Waldron
- Editing by: Aleshka Ferrero
- Original release date: October 22, 2021
- Running time: 54 minutes

Guest appearances
- Dave Foley as Peter Bullard; Janina Gavankar as Alison Namazi; Holland Taylor as Cybil Reynolds; Joe Tippett as Hal Jackson; Jack Conley as Earl; Hannah Leder as Isabella; Victoria Tate as Rena Robinson; Joe Marinelli as Donny Spagnoli; Joe Pacheco as Bart Daley; Tara Karsian as Gayle Berman; Shari Belafonte as Julia; Eli Bildner as Joel Rapkin; Amber Friendly as Layla Bell; Michelle Meredith as Lindsey Sherman

Episode chronology
← Previous "Ghosts"	Next → "La Amara Vita"

"A Private Person" is the sixth episode of the second season of the American drama television series The Morning Show, inspired by Brian Stelter's 2013 book Top of the Morning. It is the sixteenth overall episode of the series and was written by supervising producer Torrey Speer and producer Stacy Osei-Kuffour, and directed by Rachel Morrison. It was released on Apple TV+ on October 22, 2021.

The series follows the characters and culture behind a network broadcast morning news program, The Morning Show. After allegations of sexual misconduct, the male co-anchor of the program, Mitch Kessler, is forced off the show. It follows Mitch's co-host, Alex Levy, and a conservative reporter Bradley Jackson, who attracts the attention of the show's producers after a viral video. In the episode, Bradley and Laura cover for Alex when she takes a break from the show.

The episode received mixed-to-positive reviews from critics, with many polarized over the absence of Jennifer Aniston in the episode.

== Plot ==
The staff has returned to New York City, but with Alex on leave due to her back problem, they continue the show without her. Looking for a substitute, Chip (Mark Duplass) convinces Cory (Billy Crudup) in hiring Laura (Julianna Margulies), but Stella (Greta Lee) pressures them in getting Alex back as soon as possible.

Bradley (Reese Witherspoon) is delighted with the idea of Laura co-hosting, convincing her to accept the offer. However, she is surprised when her brother Hal (Joe Tippett) shows up. While he wants to build a good relationship, she is frustrated by his presence. Cybil (Holland Taylor) reminds Stella to control her staff, especially Yanko (Néstor Carbonell) after his fight video goes viral. Despite feeling grateful for standing up for her, Stella is forced to suspend Yanko for his actions. Daniel (Desean Terry) gets into trouble when he calls out a fellow co-worker, Peter Bullard (Dave Foley), during a live interview.

While performing the show, Bradley is shocked to find that her relationship with Laura has been leaked to the media. During a break, Laura suggests treating it simply as a rumor, but Bradley is frustrated that she has to disclose her private life to the public. As Maggie's book continues detailing Mitch's activities, Mia (Karen Pittman) demands that Chip find Alex, who has avoided his calls. He visits Alex's apartment, only meeting Isabella (Hannah Leder). She reveals that Alex asked her to watch her house and to not disclose her location to anyone, including Chip himself.

Arriving home, Bradley has an argument with Hal, as their mother is very shaken after reading the leak. Hal finally reveals that he visited her because he fell back on drugs and wants her to help him. She offers to pay for rehabilitation, but he refuses. Their discussion is interrupted by Cory, who wants to help Bradley deal with the leak. Bradley decides to not seek a lawsuit, feeling that this could actually be a positive change in her life. This conversation motivates her to tell Hal that he must leave her apartment, angering him.

== Development ==
=== Production ===
The episode was written by supervising producer Torrey Speer and producer Stacy Osei-Kuffour, and directed by Rachel Morrison. This was Speer's third writing credit, Osei-Kuffour's first writing credit, and Morrison's first directing credit.

== Critical reviews ==
"A Private Person" received mixed-to-positive reviews from critics. Maggie Fremont of Vulture gave the episode a 2 star rating out of 5 and wrote, "Alex Levy is missing, and that's a big problem. A problem for TMS (after all that Alex Levy's home fanfare?), a problem for Chip, and a problem for us, the audience. This show needs Alex Levy. It needs her sparring with Cory, and it definitely needs her sparring with Bradley. There have been so few Alex/Bradley scenes this season! What the hell are we even doing here, guys?!"

Linda Holmes of NPR wrote, "Yanko keeps up the "a good guy just can't win" routine about how he got in trouble over "spirit animal," and now he's in trouble for beating up a racist. You can't engage in cultural appropriation, you can't beat up racists, what can you do? Yanko asks this very thing, and Stella says that what he can do is "the weather," and the whole thing is just real sad." Chike Coleman of We Live Entertainment gave the episode a 9 out of 10 rating and wrote, "The Morning Show is a better show than it was last season, and that's saying something. Season one was brilliant, but the writers have really taken things up a notch. The only issue I see is we have way too many plot threads running at once. If the writers can resolve some of those, the show will have a clearer destiny. Either way, I will travel with these characters until the end of the season."

Lacy Baugher of Telltale TV gave the episode a 3.5 star rating out of 5 and wrote, "The Morning Show Season 2 Episode 6, “A Private Person,” is the first episode of the show in which star Jennifer Aniston does not appear onscreen. It's also, strangely enough, the best episode of the series' second season to date."
