= It's Like the Flu =

- The Morning Show episode
- Episode no.: Season 2 Episode 2
- Directed by: Mimi Leder
- Written by: Torrey Speer; Kristen Layden
- Cinematography by: David Lanzenberg
- Editing by: Sidney Wolinsky
- Original release date: September 24, 2021
- Running time: 52 minutes

Guest appearances
- Valeria Golino as Paola Lambruschini (special guest star); Janina Gavankar as Alison Namazi; Tom Irwin as Fred Micklen; Holland Taylor as Cybil Reynolds; Will Arnett as Doug Klassen; Katie Aselton as Madeleine; Hasan Minhaj as Eric Nomani; Patrick Fabian as Jeff; Mark Harelik as Richard; Hannah Leder as Isabella; Victoria Tate as Rena Robinson; Markus Flanagan as Gerald Drummond; Shari Belafonte as Julia; Michelle Meredith as Lindsey Sherman; Ali Astin as Meagan Walters-Clarke

Episode chronology
← Previous "My Least Favorite Year"	Next → "Laura"

"It's Like the Flu" is the second episode of the second season of the American drama television series The Morning Show, inspired by Brian Stelter's 2013 book Top of the Morning. It is the twelfth overall episode of the series and was written by supervising producer Torrey Speer and supervising producer Kristen Layden, and directed by executive producer Mimi Leder. It was released on Apple TV+ on September 24, 2021.

The series follows the characters and culture behind a network broadcast morning news program, The Morning Show. After allegations of sexual misconduct, the male co-anchor of the program, Mitch Kessler, is forced off the show. It follows Mitch's co-host, Alex Levy, and a conservative reporter Bradley Jackson, who attracts the attention of the show's producers after a viral video. In the episode, Alex and Bradley reunite after the former left the show, while Mitch's life in Italy is explored.

The episode received generally positive reviews from critics, with many feeling that the show's soap opera elements worked best.

== Plot ==
Cory (Billy Crudup) informs Bradley (Reese Witherspoon) that Alex (Jennifer Aniston) will return to the show. Bradley is upset, as Cory has been continuing to keep secrets from her. Cory is also dealing with Hannah's family's lawsuit, which could continue to damage UBA's image.

Alex arrives at the studio with her new agent, Doug Klassen (Will Arnett). Cory introduces her to Stella (Greta Lee), and invites them to dine with him to discuss her return, which is still not reported to the trades. As this happens, more members from the staff manage to get themselves invited to the dinner. Despite the staff expressing interest in Alex's return, Daniel (Desean Terry) is upset with her after ruining his chance to become anchor. While talking with Mia (Karen Pittman), they talk about the arrival of COVID-19 in the country, but Mia decides to only give one minute of coverage.

Mitch (Steve Carell) has moved to a mansion in Italy, bored with his routine and ignoring Fred's phone calls. While sitting at a café, he is approached by a woman, berating him for his accusations. Suddenly, another woman, Paola Lambruschini (Valeria Golino), comes to Mitch's defense. She is aware of his actions but accuses the woman of filming this encounter so she can post it on social media. Mitch leaves the scene, but gives his phone number to Paola. Later, Fred (Tom Irwin) shows up at Mitch's mansion to talk, but Mitch refuses to get involved with him.

As the guests arrive, Alex tries to apologize to Daniel, who refuses. Over dinner, they discuss the novel coronavirus and whether it is newsworthy or not. When an overwhelmed Alex tries to leave early, she is confronted by Bradley, who is still angry that Alex abandoned her when she needed her the most. While Alex expresses regret for abandoning her, she feels they do not owe anything to each other. The following day, Cory is informed that Hannah's family will not settle and want the amount of money they paid Fred to exit. Chip (Mark Duplass), who has proposed to his girlfriend Madeleine (Katie Aselton), is surprised when Alex shows up at his door. She asks him to return as her producer, which he agrees.

== Development ==
=== Production ===
The episode was written by supervising producer Torrey Speer and supervising producer Kristen Layden, and directed by executive producer Mimi Leder. This was Speer's second writing credit, Layden's second writing credit, and Leder's fifth directing credit.

== Critical reviews ==
"It's Like the Flu" received generally positive reviews from critics. Maggie Fremont of Vulture gave the episode a 3 star rating out of 5 and wrote, "Honestly, I was shocked — SHOCKED — that the main set piece of this episode was a dinner party, and no one threw a drink in someone's face. Later someone does throw a bottle of wine on the floor, so maybe that counts. Anyway, this show is a ridiculous ride and, I know I said this last season but, it is always better when it leans into that fact."

Linda Holmes of NPR wrote, "I'm not sure it's possible to keep one foot in each of those cultural moments and go for the attitude of "look, the thing is, this has all been painful for everyone," but it sure seems like they're going to try." Chike Coleman of We Live Entertainment gave the episode a 7 out of 10 rating and wrote, "This week's episode of The Morning Show is, in many ways, an inaccurate statement about Covid-19 and a microcosm for the chaos to come. “It's Just Like The Flu” spends almost the entire episode having Bradley and Alex argue over who sabotaged the other the most. Well, that may not seem the most constructive use of an hour, it is entertaining."

Lacy Baugher of Telltale TV gave the episode a 3 star rating out of 5 and wrote, "Though The Morning Show comes complete with all the trappings of a Serious Prestige Drama — the starry A-list cast, the clear production values, lush costumes, and shiny sets — Season 2 Episode 2, “It's Like the Flu,” proves that this show really works best when it recognizes that, at its heart, it's a soap opera." Claire Di Maio of The Young Folks gave the episode a 6 out of 10 and wrote, "If there's anything to learn from “It's Like the Flu,” it's that Season 2 is only getting ready to get ready."
