= Lonely at the Top (The Morning Show) =

- The Morning Show episode
- Episode no.: Season 1 Episode 8
- Directed by: Michelle MacLaren
- Written by: JC Lee
- Cinematography by: Michael Grady
- Editing by: Vikash Patel
- Original release date: December 6, 2019
- Running time: 57 minutes

Guest appearances
- Martin Short as Dick Lundy (special guest star); Paul Guilfoyle as Reid (special guest star); Janina Gavankar as Alison Namazi; Tom Irwin as Fred Micklen

Episode chronology
← Previous "Open Waters"	Next → "Play the Queen"

"Lonely at the Top" is the eighth episode of the American drama television series The Morning Show, inspired by Brian Stelter's 2013 book Top of the Morning. The episode was written by supervising producer JC Lee, and directed by Michelle MacLaren. It was released on Apple TV+ on December 6, 2019.

The series follows the characters and culture behind a network broadcast morning news program, The Morning Show. After allegations of sexual misconduct, the male co-anchor of the program, Mitch Kessler, is forced off the show. It follows Mitch's co-host, Alex Levy, and a conservative reporter Bradley Jackson, who attracts the attention of the show's producers after a viral video. In the episode, flashbacks depict Mitch's mid-life crisis during his tenure in the show in 2017.

The episode received generally positive reviews from critics, who praised the performances and themes. For the episode, Steve Carell received a nomination for Outstanding Lead Actor in a Drama Series at the 72nd Primetime Emmy Awards.

== Plot ==
In 2017, Mitch (Steve Carell) wakes up in the morning to go to work. His 50th birthday is two days away, yet he does not feel content with it. His affair with Mia (Karen Pittman) has finished, and he asks Chip (Mark Duplass) to send her to work with Alex (Jennifer Aniston) from now on. While Alex views Mitch as a friend, she is frustrated that he is given special treatment.

After the show, the staff throws a birthday party to Mitch. During this, Mitch meets Hannah (Gugu Mbatha-Raw), who has impressed him as a booker. At the party, Claire (Bel Powley) is introduced to many of the staff, including Yanko (Néstor Carbonell). Subsequently, Dick Lundy (Martin Short) shows up to present a dance number for Mitch, to his delight. As the party ends, Mitch talks with Dick over his legacy, wondering if he accomplished everything already. He draws comparisons to Dick's career; while Dick will still be well known for his films in the years to come, Mitch feels that his image dies whenever he retires.

Suddenly, Hannah reports to Chip that a mass shooting has started in Las Vegas. Chip sends Mitch and Alex to Las Vegas to cover the news, and Mitch specifically asks him to get Hannah to accompany them. As Alex feels emotional over the death reports, Mitch consoles her by using their status in an attempt to move forward. While Mitch wants to go for a drink, Alex turns him down. He then silently walks through the city, stressing over his future. At the Las Vegas Strip, he runs into Hannah, who is still devastated over the tragedy. He takes her to his motel room to watch Caddyshack but she does not find it funny. As he consoles her, he kisses her and starts undressing her. He then rapes a confused Hannah, who leaves the following morning.

In New York, Hannah is distracted over the events. She runs into Mitch at the hallways, who simply gives her a gesture. Hannah then visits Fred (Tom Irwin) at his office, crying about what Mitch did. Fred claims to understand, only to suddenly offer her the position of head booker. Realizing he is buying her silence, Hannah accepts, disappointed. As this happens, a news report detailing sexual abuse cases against Harvey Weinstein is seen. Alex and Mitch express disgust, with Mitch leaving the room.

== Development ==
=== Production ===
The episode was written by supervising producer JC Lee, and directed by Michelle MacLaren. This was Lee's first writing credit, and MacLaren's first directing credit.

=== Writing ===
Kerry Ehrin wanted the episode to show Mitch's success at the network, "It was a patriarchy and he was like the Alpha man. The episode also shows the fun side for Mitch and how other people were joining in on it and accepting it — that's the way that it was." She added, "This episode, to me, is about showing that someone like Mitch can call his actions inadvertent or say they were consensual, but there's also a part of him that is choosing to not actually see the person he’s with, because it's not convenient to what he wants."

== Critical reviews ==
"Lonely at the Top" received generally positive reviews from critics. Maggie Fremont of Vulture gave the episode a 3 star rating out of 5 and wrote, "The Morning Show wastes no time in proving our hunch right: “Lonely at the Top” shows us exactly what transpired between Mitch and Hannah in all of its terrible detail. It is most definitely not what I needed in this critical post-Thanksgiving/pre-holiday time. It is as awful as you imagine. Honestly, where is Cory Ellison with another hilarious and alarming speech born from the brain of a delightful psychopath when you need him?"

Jodi Walker of Entertainment Weekly wrote, "in this episode, we see how charming Mitch really was, rather than just hearing about it; we see why America and many people on the TMS staff would have loved him. Before this we've heard about those things, but what we've mostly seen is a narcissistic crybaby who wants to blame anyone but himself for his own actions. In this hourlong flashback, though, Steve Carell is every ounce of a charismatic star who's also fully capable deteriorating into a self-loathing mess the moment the cameras turn off." Morgan Baila of Refinery29 wrote, "This is the toxic workplace culture Ashley was referring to in episode 4, when she says everyone treated her differently after rumors about her and Mitch were circulated. Everyone is covering up for him, even, it seems, the women he created inappropriate relationships with. If The Morning Show was a ship, then Mitch was the captain, and no one wanted to be thrown overboard."

Esme Mazzeo of Telltale TV gave the episode a 3 star rating out of 5 and wrote, "The Morning Show is usually good at balancing stories, but this episode makes it clear that they might be underusing their female talent. It's ironic but sad." Veronique Englebert of The Review Geek gave the episode a 4 star rating out of 5 and wrote, "This was a really interesting episode, giving a lot more depth into the story and while we only see the past, it reinforces the narrative by given us some background for all our characters."

=== Awards and accolades ===
Steve Carell submitted the episode to support his nomination for Outstanding Lead Actor in a Drama Series at the 72nd Primetime Emmy Awards. He would lose to Jeremy Strong for Succession.
