= Hello Sunshine =

Hello Sunshine may refer to:

- "Hello Sunshine" (Super Furry Animals song)
- "Hello Sunshine" (Bruce Springsteen song)
- Hello Sunshine (book), a collection of poems and short stories by Ryan Adams
- Hello Sunshine (company), an American media company founded by actress Reese Witherspoon
- Hello Sunshine (graphic novel), 2025 graphic novel by Keezy Young
- "Hello Sunshine," a song by The Hoosiers from the 2023 album Confidence
