= La Amara Vita =

- The Morning Show episode
- Episode no.: Season 2 Episode 7
- Directed by: Mimi Leder
- Written by: Kerry Ehrin; Scott Troy
- Cinematography by: David Lanzenberg
- Editing by: Sidney Wolinsky
- Original release date: October 29, 2021
- Running time: 51 minutes

Guest appearance
- Valeria Golino as Paola Lambruschini (special guest star)

Episode chronology
← Previous "A Private Person"	Next → "Confirmations"

"La Amara Vita" is the seventh episode of the second season of the American drama television series The Morning Show, inspired by Brian Stelter's 2013 book Top of the Morning. It is the seventeenth overall episode of the series and was written by series developer Kerry Ehrin and Scott Troy, and directed by executive producer Mimi Leder. It was released on Apple TV+ on October 29, 2021.

The series follows the characters and culture behind a network broadcast morning news program, The Morning Show. After allegations of sexual misconduct, the male co-anchor of the program, Mitch Kessler, is forced off the show. It follows Mitch's co-host, Alex Levy, and a conservative reporter Bradley Jackson, who attracts the attention of the show's producers after a viral video. In the episode, Alex visits Mitch at Italy to get him to clarify a few details from Maggie's book.

The episode received generally positive reviews from critics, although some were divided over the closure to Mitch's story arc.

== Plot ==
In Italy, Mitch (Steve Carell) hopes to return to see his children after his quarantine with Paola (Valeria Golino) ends. To Paola's surprise, Mitch asks her to delete her interview where he discusses Hannah, feeling the world should not see it. Hearing the doorbell, he is surprised to see Alex (Jennifer Aniston) outside.

Alex confronts Mitch for talking with Maggie; he did not deny their affair, which is taken as a confirmation by the book. She wants her to make a statement denying it, but he will only do it after talking with his attorney. As she prepares to leave, Mitch convinces her to stay and get to understand his mindset, before finally moving on. Mitch explains some of his actions and addressing his relationship with Alex. Alex is forced to drive to Milan to find a new flight, but falls asleep in her car. During this, Paola informs Mitch that the professor they interviewed has died from COVID-19.

Alex pulls over to take a sleep, until a police officer wakes her up. With Italy on a lockdown and zero contacts to help her, Alex is forced to return to Mitch's mansion. Mitch has written the statement, but welcomes her back after she expresses feeling lost, while also getting her a flight home in the morning. As they spend time together, Alex confesses that she once felt she was pregnant again after having sex with Mitch, and was disappointed it wasn't true, as she felt content with him. Mitch asks Alex to help Paola build a career with her connections, and she promises to try it. When a news report shows up detailing Mitch's preference towards African American women, Alex decides to leave.

Depressed, Mitch visits Paola, where he finally gives in and has sex with her. Paola reveals she has not deleted the interview, as she wants to have a memory of him. As Alex drives to the airport, Mitch drives back home. Feeling the turmoil of how people view him, Mitch willingly drives his car off a cliff. Before dying, Mitch reminisces over his stay with Alex, with both dancing together.

== Development ==
=== Production ===
The episode was written by series developer Kerry Ehrin and Scott Troy, and directed by executive producer Mimi Leder. This was Ehrin's fifth writing credit, Troy's second writing credit, and Leder's sixth directing credit.

=== Writing ===
The episode features the death of the character Mitch Kessler, portrayed by Steve Carell. Kerry Ehrin explained that she came up with the idea since the beginning of the series. Ehrin said that his death was more "ambiguous", but Carell "pitched the idea that it was a more active choice, which I thought was really interesting from someone who was really inside the character."

== Critical reviews ==
"La Amara Vita" received generally positive reviews from critics. Maggie Fremont of Vulture gave the episode a 4 star rating out of 5 and wrote, "It's episodes like “La Amara Vita” that make me wish The Morning Show actually started well before the implosion of TMS and Mitch Kessler's sexual misconduct coming to light so that we could've watched more of Alex Levy and Mitch doing their thing on-air and off — their relationship is much more complex and interesting than most things happening on this show, and Jennifer Aniston and Steve Carrell have killer onscreen chemistry."

Linda Holmes of NPR wrote, "Driving off the side of a mountain doesn't make you a better person or a worse person. The suggestion, but not quite the declaration, that Mitch is attempting suicide feels like it's just an extension of the martyrdom they've extended to him all season, and it's positively bizarre. This is like the cymbal crash in the grand symphony of Poor Mitch, and it's just a wildly ill-conceived story idea."

Lacy Baugher of Telltale TV gave the episode a 2.5 star rating out of 5 and wrote, "Truly, some of the choices The Morning Show is making this season are just so bizarre. The show seems desperate for its viewers to still see Mitch as a sympathetic figure, to question whether what he did was “really” that bad, to cheer for him and his lady friend when they finally hook up with each other." Claire Di Maio of The Young Folks gave the episode a 7 out of 10 and wrote, "though Alex is arguably the most self-interested character on the series, it's hard to forget that The Morning Show began as the story of a disgraced public figure and the colleague he left behind. A bitter life for Alex, indeed."

Meghan O'Keefe of Decider wrote, "The Morning Show is one of the most balls-to-the-wall dramatic shows on television and it just topped itself in “La Amara Vita.”" Chike Coleman of We Live Entertainment gave the episode a 9 out of 10 rating and wrote, "I love episodes like this because they make you think, and they make you question what you believe. Moral ambiguity is king. This is a powerful episode about a topic that is far too often swept under the carpet for the benefit of the powerful and the controlling. The Morning Show proves it continues to be appointment television. I can’t wait to see what they do next."
