= The Pendulum Swings =

- The Morning Show episode
- Episode no.: Season 1 Episode 6
- Directed by: Tucker Gates
- Written by: Kristen Layden
- Cinematography by: Michael Grady
- Editing by: Vikash Patel
- Original release date: November 22, 2019
- Running time: 56 minutes

Guest appearances
- Mike O'Malley as Tim Eavers (special guest star); Janina Gavankar as Alison Namazi; Tom Irwin as Fred Micklen

Episode chronology
← Previous "No One's Gonna Harm You, Not While I'm Around"	Next → "Open Waters"

"The Pendulum Swings" is the sixth episode of the American drama television series The Morning Show, inspired by Brian Stelter's 2013 book Top of the Morning. The episode was written by producer Kristen Layden, and directed by Tucker Gates. It was released on Apple TV+ on November 22, 2019.

The series follows the characters and culture behind a network broadcast morning news program, The Morning Show. After allegations of sexual misconduct, the male co-anchor of the program, Mitch Kessler, is forced off the show. It follows Mitch's co-host, Alex Levy, and a conservative reporter Bradley Jackson, who attracts the attention of the show's producers after a viral video. In the episode, the staff goes to California to report wildfires engulfing the state, while Alex struggles when her husband asks for the divorce.

The episode received positive reviews from critics, with Jennifer Aniston receiving high praise for her performance.

== Plot ==
Wildfires occur in California, prompting Fred (Tom Irwin) to get The Morning Show to report it, in an attempt to move past Mitch's scandal. As Alex (Jennifer Aniston) wakes up, she is visited by her estranged husband Jason (Jack Davenport); he is fed up with her narcissism, and wants to officially divorce.

In California, Alex's crisis continues affecting her job, and she is still at odds with Bradley (Reese Witherspoon). This feud begins to affect the show, as it interferes with the reports. Claire (Bel Powley) tells Bradley that she found information about wealthy people paying private firefighters for protection, and while Bradley wants to report it, Alex and Chip (Mark Duplass) dismiss it. Nevertheless, Hannah (Gugu Mbatha-Raw) helps Claire in securing a survivor for the show. Inspired by Hannah's professional advice, Claire expresses interest in becoming Bradley's executive assistant; Bradley is impressed by Claire's confidence and offers her the job. Meanwhile, Chip expresses worry about his job to Cory (Billy Crudup), as he will be fired if anything damages the network's image. Chip suggests he could be an ally in helping Cory take over from Fred, leading Cory to suggest that Chip should come to him when he has real dirt on Fred.

Alex and Bradley interview a man who saved dogs from the wildfires, but Alex becomes emotional and ends up crying on live television. Afterwards, Alex goes to her trailer, refusing Bradley's help in comforting her. Chip tells Bradley they cannot run the private firefighters story as Fred is one of those who hired them, but eventually allows her to do it anyway. In her trailer, Alex finally explains to Bradley that she is concerned about her divorce, as she fears her daughter will blame her; this prompts Bradley to reveal her strained relationship with her father, who accidentally killed a kid while driving under the influence. That night, Claire visits Yanko (Néstor Carbonell) at his hotel room to celebrate her new promotion. This is noticed by Hannah, who is later seen abusing drugs in her hotel room. As she is about to go to sleep, Bradley receives an e-mail from Mitch, who wants to meet with her to discuss something.

== Development ==
=== Production ===
The episode was written by producer Kristen Layden, and directed by Tucker Gates. This was Layden's first writing credit, and Gates' first directing credit.

== Critical reviews ==
"The Pendulum Swings" received positive reviews from critics. Maggie Fremont of Vulture gave the episode a 4 star rating out of 5 and wrote, "Truth be told, The Morning Show has always been about burning it all to the ground, and in “The Pendulum Swings,” the show takes that metaphor a little more literally, as TMS and its two leading ladies head to Los Angeles to cover the raging wildfires, currently destroying lives."

Jodi Walker of Entertainment Weekly wrote, "We're suddenly halfway into The Morning Show's first season, and the series is leaning in hard on the dysfunctional family aspect of its show-within-a-show. Family are generally the people in your life you're most vulnerable to, the ones who know you best and can use that knowledge to comfort you — or hurt you — like no one else can. But the weird thing about this new Morning Show family is that they've been forced into that vulnerability before they even really know each other. And this week, they're going on a good old-fashioned family road trip, where goodwill goes to die."

Bethonie Butler of The Washington Post praised Aniston's performance, "After decades in an industry known for limiting opportunities for women, especially as they age, Aniston undoubtedly knows how it feels to be underestimated. But refreshingly, she embraces all of her roles — even the one that threatened to render her typecast per an all-too-familiar Hollywood tradition."

Esme Mazzeo of Telltale TV gave the episode a 4.5 star rating out of 5 and wrote, "Jennifer Aniston is brilliant throughout the entire breakdown. It's hard to watch, but that's because it's real and physical. In our lives, we don't usually accompany breakdowns with monologues." Veronique Englebert of The Review Geek gave the episode a 3.5 star rating out of 5 and wrote, "The Morning Show remains an enjoyable drama with enough interesting characterisation and plot twists to keep you coming back for more."
