= The Interview (The Morning Show) =

- The Morning Show episode
- Episode no.: Season 1 Episode 10
- Directed by: Mimi Leder
- Written by: Kerry Ehrin
- Cinematography by: Michael Grady
- Editing by: Carola Kravetz Aykanian; Aleshka Ferrero
- Original release date: December 20, 2019
- Running time: 66 minutes

Guest appearances
- Marcia Gay Harden as Maggie Brener (special guest star); Hayes MacArthur as Marlon Tate (special guest star); Janina Gavankar as Alison Namazi; Tom Irwin as Fred Micklen

Episode chronology
← Previous "Play the Queen"	Next → "My Least Favorite Year"

"The Interview" is the tenth episode and first season finale of the American drama television series The Morning Show, inspired by Brian Stelter's 2013 book Top of the Morning. The episode was written by series developer Kerry Ehrin, and directed by executive producer Mimi Leder. It was released on Apple TV+ on December 20, 2019.

The series follows the characters and culture behind a network broadcast morning news program, The Morning Show. After allegations of sexual misconduct, the male co-anchor of the program, Mitch Kessler, is forced off the show. It follows Mitch's co-host, Alex Levy, and a conservative reporter Bradley Jackson, who attracts the attention of the show's producers after a viral video. In the episode, Bradley, Cory and Chip try to secure Mitch's interview before the network stops their efforts.

The episode received highly positive reviews from critics, who praised the performances, writing and ending. For the episode, Mark Duplass received a nomination for Outstanding Supporting Actor in a Drama Series, while Mimi Leder received a nomination for Outstanding Directing for a Drama Series at the 72nd Primetime Emmy Awards.

== Plot ==
Bradley (Reese Witherspoon), Cory (Billy Crudup) and Chip (Mark Duplass) visit Mitch (Steve Carell) to conduct the interview. He confirms Hannah (Gugu Mbatha-Raw) was the anonymous tip, and Bradley leaves to meet with her as they prepare to get the interview ready before the network interferes.

Alex (Jennifer Aniston) meets with Marlon Tate (Hayes MacArthur), courting him as the executive producer. Bradley meets with Hannah, who is initially hesitant to take part in the interview. After tearfully recounting her encounter with Mitch in Las Vegas, Hannah simply asks Bradley not to reveal her identity, and to wait until she accepts a new UBA job in Los Angeles. Fred (Tom Irwin) dines with Maggie (Marcia Gay Harden), and she informs him of an investigation into UBA, angering him. He subsequently tells Alex that he will grant her co-host approval in exchange for her support in firing Chip. Alex accepts Fred's offer, and Fred then fires Chip, claiming the investigation found him responsible for covering Mitch's actions.

As Bradley and Chip work in getting the interview ready before the next show, Cory tells Mitch that he needs to own up to his actions if he wants to find acceptance. Early the next morning, Chip explains the interview plan to his assistant Rena, who agree to smuggle Mitch into the studio to do the interview live and on-air; Chip also informs her that he has been fired and that they need to act soon. During this, Claire (Bel Powley) calls Hannah, but gets no answer. Hoping to make amends, Claire visits Hannah's apartment but is horrified to find that Hannah has died from an overdose. Claire tearfully calls Bradley to inform her of Hannah's death, and Bradley somberly reveals the news to her stunned colleagues.

Feeling guilty, Bradley decides to not do the interview and asks Chip to inform Mitch. Chip visits Mitch and they get into a fight, with Chip revealing he leaked Mitch's actions to The New York Times. Bradley tells Alex her intended plans, which would also discredit Alex's image. Alex comforts her and convinces her to continue with the show. She is then called by Chip, although she is already on-set and does not pick up her phone, who leaves a message confirming he leaked the story to prevent Alex's firing. As the show begins, Alex refuses to participate, still shocked by the news of Hannah's death and troubled by her own complicity in the culture created by Fred and Mitch. Alex then interrupts Bradley reading the news and the two of them agree to speak about Fred and the network; Cory prevents Marlon from cutting the feed, while the producers lock Fred from entering the control room. Alex and Bradley report on Fred's cover-up leading to a toxic environment, and reveal the network's knowledge of sexual misconduct. As they ask more people to speak out, the feed is cut off. The episode ends with Mitch, alone in his house.

== Development ==
=== Production ===
The episode was written by series developer Kerry Ehrin, and directed by executive producer Mimi Leder. This was Ehrin's third writing credit, and Leder's third directing credit.

=== Writing ===
On Hannah's death, Ehrin explained, "She was in the eye of a hurricane. It's like everybody was swirling around her. Everybody wanted something from her, everybody was trying to manipulate her so that they got something out of this. She couldn't find a way out of it. And she had worked so hard to cover that up and not have it be public and she was so ashamed of it. She was ashamed she accepted the promotion, and she was ashamed it happened. She took on all of those things and had no outlet for. It eventually crushed her — whether it was just from self-medication, which she was doing on a regular basis, that went awry or it wasn't intentional. It was just too big for that young woman."

Regarding Chip's actions, Mark Duplass explained, "I do think Chip was probably guilty of turning a blind eye to some things that he didn't want to see so that he wouldn't have to deal with them, so that he could keep his show going. And I don't think you can do that anymore. They figured that out in the course of the season."

=== Filming ===
Mitch alone in his house was always conceived as the final shot of the season. Leder said that while they considered ending it with color bars, "it didn't feel as gratifying and haunting without seeing Mitch alone in the world of his own making."

== Critical reviews ==
"The Interview" received highly positive reviews from critics. Maggie Fremont of Vulture gave the episode a 4 star rating out of 5 and wrote, "Was it at times cheesy as hell and trying way too hard? Yes. Did Bradley Jackson never once make complete sense as a character? Also, yes. But does it pretty much stick the landing? You betcha. Once a show rolls out the Vivaldi while two main characters fist fight on an apartment building lobby floor, you know it is Getting! Things! Done!"

Morgan Baila of Refinery29 wrote, "It has been a minute since a character's death affected me as much as Hannah Schoenfield's on The Morning Show. The season one finale — named "The Interview" discussed interview between Bradley Jackson and Mitch Kessler that never happens (sic), and the ultimately life-changing interview between Bradley and Hannah — wrapped up the events of season one with a shocking death, and a predictable outburst, the combination of which left one recapper — myself — extremely frustrated." Keri Lumm of Paste wrote, "What blew my mind was how the show deals with the loyalties of their staff to keep them in the top position. After all, their job depends on it too. And in this whole last episode, we see it all fall apart. All because Mitch was left unchecked in his hornballer ways."

Esme Mazzeo of Telltale TV gave the episode a 4.5 star rating out of 5 and wrote, "Exposing and preventing sexual predators is important. But if The Morning Show Season 1 finale teaches one lesson it's that victims' health comes first and the stories we read about incidents are just one piece of healing a toxic culture." Veronique Englebert of The Review Geek gave the episode a 4 star rating out of 5 and wrote, "While it does leave some things open, the drama manages to give a very satisfying conclusion, wrapping the main story up quite well."

=== Awards and accolades ===
TVLine named Jennifer Aniston as the "Performer of the Week" for the week of December 21, 2019, for her performance in the episode. The site wrote, "Breaking Morning Show news: Aniston is an absolute revelation as embattled co-anchor Alex Levy. We knew the Friends all-star had comedy chops to spare. And courtesy of her indie film work, she's proven herself to be no dramatic slouch either. But the Apple TV+ series has afforded the A-list actress the rare opportunity to regularly play comedy and drama (and even camp) simultaneously and, at times, unsympathetically. And she has more than risen to the occasion. Truthfully, we didn't know she had it in her. But after watching this week's Morning Show finale, our skepticism has officially given way to conviction. Aniston is the real deal."

Mark Duplass submitted the episode to support his nomination for Outstanding Supporting Actor in a Drama Series at the 72nd Primetime Emmy Awards. He would lose to his own co-star, Billy Crudup.

Additionally, Mimi Leder received a nomination for Outstanding Directing for a Drama Series. She would lose to Andrij Parekh for Succession for the episode "Hunting".
