= My Least Favorite Year =

- The Morning Show episode
- Episode no.: Season 2 Episode 1
- Directed by: Mimi Leder
- Written by: Eric Lipez; Adam Milch; Kerry Ehrin
- Cinematography by: David Lanzenberg
- Editing by: Sidney Wolinsky
- Original release date: September 17, 2021
- Running time: 53 minutes

Guest appearances
- Janina Gavankar as Alison Namazi; Tom Irwin as Fred Micklen; Holland Taylor as Cybil Reynolds; Hasan Minhaj as Eric Nomani; Katie Aselton as Madeleine; Kathy Najimy as Sylvia Portman; Hannah Leder as Isabella; Augustus Prew as Sean; James Urbaniak as Backstage Manager; Mark Harelik as Richard; Victoria Tate as Rena Robinson; Tara Karsian as Gayle Berman; Joe Marinelli as Donny Spagnoli; Joe Pacheco as Bart Daley; Shari Belafonte as Julia; Eli Bildner as Joel Rapkin; Amber Friendly as Layla Bell; Michelle Meredith as Lindsey Sherman

Episode chronology
← Previous "The Interview"	Next → "It's Like the Flu"

"My Least Favorite Year" is the first episode of the second season of the American drama television series The Morning Show, inspired by Brian Stelter's 2013 book Top of the Morning. It is the eleventh overall episode of the series and was written by executive producer Erica Lipez, executive producer Adam Milch, and series developer Kerry Ehrin, and directed by executive producer Mimi Leder. It was released on Apple TV+ on September 17, 2021.

The series follows the characters and culture behind a network broadcast morning news program, The Morning Show. After allegations of sexual misconduct, the male co-anchor of the program, Mitch Kessler, is forced off the show. It follows Mitch's co-host, Alex Levy, and a conservative reporter Bradley Jackson, who attracts the attention of the show's producers after a viral video. In the episode, Alex and Bradley experience a fallout after exposing UBA on live television.

The episode received positive reviews from critics, who praised the new focus and storylines, although some expressed criticism for the over-abundance of subplots.

== Plot ==
In the aftermath of their broadcast, Alex (Jennifer Aniston) and Bradley (Reese Witherspoon) prepare for a potential fallout. While they are approached by people to give statements, Fred (Tom Irwin) is put on administrative leave, while Cory (Billy Crudup) is informed that he has been fired.

Eight months later, and three months before COVID-19 empties the streets of New York, Bradley has become co-host of TMS with Eric Nomani (Hasan Minhaj), and has helped Cory in getting his job back. When Ray Marcus, UBA's evening news anchor, is fired from the network for accusations of verbal abuse, Bradley expresses interest in taking his place, but Cory convinces her she must stay in the morning cycle. During this, Cory wants to secure Eric to move into evening news without letting Bradley know beforehand. He shares this concern to Stella Bak (Greta Lee), the new president of UBA's news division; Stella is frustrated by the ratings decline and is heavily considering not extending Bradley's contract until she finds a new co-host.

Alex has quit the show and lives a secluded life in Maine, writing a book about her experience at UBA. While her editor likes the manuscript, Alex is pressured to talk about her relationship with Mitch, which she refuses to do. She is visited by Cory, who wants her to return to The Morning Show. Alex refuses, claiming she is done with the network. With Alex out of the running, Stella decides to sign with Aaron, another candidate who has tested well with audiences, but Cory does not believe his presence will rescue the show.

While covering New Year's Eve, Eric informs Bradley about his transfer to evening news, leading her to confront Cory. Alex attends a party and becomes uneasy after receiving a reading from a psychic, who claims she might be feeling guilt. After Cory leaves her a poem in a voicemail, Alex calls him back, promising to give him an answer tomorrow to secure her possible return. As New York prepares to welcome 2020, Mia (Karen Pittman) prepares a few stories ready to run, choosing to ignore news about a new pandemic. Cory calls Stella, telling her they have good news. As he tells her, he sees a news ticker that reveals Hannah's family has filed a wrongful death lawsuit against UBA.

== Development ==
=== Production ===
The episode was written by executive producer Erica Lipez, executive producer Adam Milch, and series developer Kerry Ehrin, and directed by executive producer Mimi Leder. This was Lipez's third writing credit, Milch's second writing credit, Ehrin's fourth writing credit, and Leder's fourth directing credit.

== Critical reviews ==
"My Least Favorite Year" received positive reviews from critics. Maggie Fremont of Vulture gave the episode a 4 star rating out of 5, while Claire Di Maio of The Young Folks gave the episode a 7 out of 10.

Linda Holmes of NPR wrote, "I want to talk about this show this season, even if you're not watching all of it. I want to talk about how they're using celebrity, how they're trying to capture shreds of the zeitgeist, why Steve Carell is still part of the show (he is!), and whether they have anything left to say about media or the #MeToo movement. But I also want to talk about how they shoot and light these people, how they dress them and do their hair, what music they use, and how they structure stories. Because in all its messiness, The Morning Show is a story about what television looks like at the moment."

Lacy Baugher of Telltale TV gave the episode a 4 star rating out of 5 and wrote, "New York City was certainly uniquely devastated by the earliest days of COVID-19 and it's probably necessary for a show that has so thoroughly embedded the Big Apple into its very DNA to somehow address it. How that's ultimately going to work out though, we'll just have to wait and see."

=== Awards and accolades ===
Billy Crudup submitted the episode to support his nomination for Outstanding Supporting Actor in a Drama Series at the 74th Primetime Emmy Awards. He would lose to Matthew Macfadyen for Succession.
