= Laura (The Morning Show) =

- The Morning Show episode
- Episode no.: Season 2 Episode 3
- Directed by: Lesli Linka Glatter
- Written by: Brian Chamberlayne; Jeff Augustin
- Cinematography by: John Brawley
- Editing by: Aleshka Ferrero; Henk Van Eeghen
- Original release date: October 1, 2021
- Running time: 53 minutes

Guest appearances
- Marcia Gay Harden as Maggie Brener (special guest star); Valeria Golino as Paola Lambruschini (special guest star); Janina Gavankar as Alison Namazi; Tom Irwin as Fred Micklen; Hasan Minhaj as Eric Nomani; Ryan Alexander Holmes as Ian; Hannah Leder as Isabella; Victoria Tate as Rena Robinson; Tara Karsian as Gayle Burns; Andrea Bendewald as Valerie; Joe Marinelli as Donny Spagnoli; Joe Pacheco as Bart Daley; Shari Belafonte as Julia; Eli Bildner as Joel Rapkin; Amber Friendly as Layla Bell; Michelle Meredith as Lindsey Sherman

Episode chronology
| ← Previous "It's Like the Flu" | Next → "Kill the Fatted Calf" |

"Laura" is the third episode of the second season of the American drama television series The Morning Show, inspired by Brian Stelter's 2013 book Top of the Morning. It is the thirteenth overall episode of the series and was written by co-executive producer Brian Chamberlayne and Jeff Augustin, and directed by Lesli Linka Glatter. It was released on Apple TV+ on October 1, 2021.

The series follows the characters and culture behind a network broadcast morning news program, The Morning Show. After allegations of sexual misconduct, the male co-anchor of the program, Mitch Kessler, is forced off the show. It follows Mitch's co-host, Alex Levy, and a conservative reporter Bradley Jackson, who attracts the attention of the show's producers after a viral video. In the episode, Alex prepares for an interview that could detail her past with Mitch, while Paola tells Mitch about her new idea.

The episode received generally positive reviews from critics, who praised the performances and storylines, but expressing criticism for the amount of subplots.

== Plot ==
In Wuhan, Daniel (Desean Terry) is awakened in the middle of the night by his colleagues, as they must leave the city before it is locked down. They manage to pass through an over-crowded station and flee the city, starting a mandatory quarantine stay at a hotel.

Alex (Jennifer Aniston) is finally confirmed to return to the show, with Bradley (Reese Witherspoon) reporting it on live television. Bradley wants to moderate the 2020 Democratic Party presidential debate, but Cory cannot promise it. She later meets with Alex to dine and talk with Maggie (Marcia Gay Harden), who is writing a tell-all book on UBA.

As part of UBA's promotion of Alex's return, Laura Peterson (Julianna Margulies), a journalist and news anchor, interviews Alex. During the interview, Alex feels uncomfortable when Laura asks about her relationship with Mitch, maintaining that she has not contacted him in a long time.

In Italy, Fred (Tom Irwin) wants Mitch (Steve Carell) to help him counter-suit Hannah's family, but he is not interested in any involvement. Later, Mitch meets with Paola (Valeria Golino), who reveals herself to be a documentarian. Noting Mitch is distracted by Alex's return to the show, she asks him to move on and help her in a documentary over an overturned rape case in the country, but Mitch turns it down. However, having seen the state of America, Mitch contacts her to confirm he will help her.

Laura also interviews Bradley as she prepares to take part in the debate, building a bond in the process. After the interview is over, Laura expresses surprise with Bradley, considering her better than she anticipated. Suddenly, Bradley kisses her, and Laura kisses her back. The following day, Alex arrives at the studio, welcomed by the staff. She joins Bradley in their seats, as the show begins broadcasting.

== Development ==
=== Production ===
The episode was written by co-executive producer Brian Chamberlayne and Jeff Augustin, and directed by Lesli Linka Glatter. This was Chamberlayne's first writing credit, Augustin's second writing credit, and Glatter's first directing credit.

=== Writing ===
Regarding the kiss between Bradley and Laura, Reese Witherspoon said, "Laura Peterson, is so incredibly appealing, she's so in her power and in her space, and I think there's something about Bradley that just is so attracted to that."

== Critical reviews ==
"Laura" received mixed to positive reviews from critics.

Maggie Fremont of Vulture gave the episode a 3 star rating out of 5. Linda Holmes of NPR wrote, "this show looks and behaves like a good show in certain ways, but it is not actually a good show. Pretty and glamorous, yes. It is well-lit! It is beautifully costumed! It is impeccably designed! But as a story, it is... well-lit. This episode feels like table-setting for episodes that are yet to come, but (so?) there's a lack of momentum and tension about the events that are actually unfolding."

Lacy Baugher of Telltale TV gave the episode a 3 star rating out of 5 and wrote, "the scenes between Alex and Bradley are just an order of magnitude better than anything else happening on The Morning Show right now and the difference in quality is jarring whenever the show focuses on anything either than the two of them." Claire Di Maio of The Young Folks gave the episode an 8 out of 10 and wrote, "The Morning Show embraces that soapiness so fully that it instills more confidence in the idea that the show does have a strong sense of self. If it's so decisively moving into “primetime soap” territory, then there's much more promise on the horizon after all."
