= Kill the Fatted Calf =

- The Morning Show episode
- Episode no.: Season 2 Episode 4
- Directed by: Jessica Yu
- Written by: Ali Vingiano; Scott Troy
- Cinematography by: David Lanzenberg
- Editing by: Henk Van Eeghen
- Original release date: October 8, 2021
- Running time: 57 minutes

Guest appearances
- Foo Fighters as Themselves (special appearance); Valeria Golino as Paola Lambruschini (special guest star); Janina Gavankar as Alison Namazi; Holland Taylor as Cybil Reynolds; Embeth Davidtz as Paige Kessler; Oona Roche as Lizzy Craig; Hannah Leder as Isabella; Victoria Tate as Rena Robinson; Tara Karsian as Gayle Burns; Markus Flanagan as Gerald Drummond; Joe Marinelli as Donny Spagnoli; Joe Pacheco as Bart Daley; Shari Belafonte as Julia; Andrea Bendewald as Valerie; Eli Bildner as Joel Rapkin; Amber Friendly as Layla Bell

Episode chronology
← Previous "Laura"	Next → "Ghosts"

"Kill the Fatted Calf" is the fourth episode of the second season of the American drama television series The Morning Show, inspired by Brian Stelter's 2013 book Top of the Morning. It is the fourteenth overall episode of the series and was written by Ali Vingiano and Scott Troy, and directed by Jessica Yu. It was released on Apple TV+ on October 8, 2021.

The series follows the characters and culture behind a network broadcast morning news program, The Morning Show. After allegations of sexual misconduct, the male co-anchor of the program, Mitch Kessler, is forced off the show. It follows Mitch's co-host, Alex Levy, and a conservative reporter Bradley Jackson, who attracts the attention of the show's producers after a viral video. In the episode, the staff competes to moderate the upcoming Presidential Debate, and Mitch helps Paola with her documentary.

The episode received generally positive reviews from critics, who praised the performances, but expressed confusion with Daniel's actions.

== Plot ==
Alex (Jennifer Aniston) receives a warm welcome at The Morning Show, with the Foo Fighters playing a song during the broadcast. With the Presidential Debate coming up, members of the staff are lobbying for the job of moderators.

Daniel (Desean Terry) wants Mia (Karen Pittman) to push for him to moderate the debate, but is unhappy that she can only give him very few minutes. However, Stella (Greta Lee) dismisses Daniel, prioritizing the other anchors for the debate. She wants Alex to moderate, but Alex is still annoyed that the network would get a young person like Stella to lead their division. During this, Stella forces Yanko (Néstor Carbonell) to issue an apology after referring to Groundhog Day as his "spirit animal", causing uproar in social media.

In Italy, Mitch (Steve Carell) and Paola (Valeria Golino) arrive at a university to prepare for the documentary, interviewing a professor. During this, Mitch is called by his ex-wife, who reveals that a news trade tried to publish a story painting Hannah in a bad light, but he says he did not send it. He subsequently calls Cory (Billy Crudup) to inform him, deducing that Fred is behind it. After the interview, Mitch and Paola dine, and Paola surprises him by kissing him. Later, the professor is revealed to be infected with COVID-19, and Paola convinces Mitch to quarantine together.

Bradley (Reese Witherspoon) and Laura (Julianna Margulies) continue their sexual relationship, and Laura prompts Bradley to ask Cory about getting the moderator position. Cory states they do not want two white women as moderators and Alex is already set up, but their conversation fixes their grudge. When Bradley informs Laura of this, the two fight as Laura cannot understand why Bradley refuses to admit her bisexuality, and Bradley is angered at being labeled. Before starting the following day's show, Bradley talks with Stella to get her spot as moderator by coming out, but fails to do so and later apologizes to Laura. During this, Daniel goes off-script and begins singing "America" to serenade Alex, confusing the staff. After consulting with Stella on the importance of her presence, Alex finally agrees to be a moderator. After talking with UBA board member Cybil Reynolds (Holland Taylor), Cory decides to face Fred to stop the story from being published.

== Development ==
=== Production ===
The episode was written by Ali Vingiano and Scott Troy, and directed by Jessica Yu. This was Vingiano's second writing credit, Troy's first writing credit, and Yu's first directing credit.

=== Music ===
In the episode, Daniel sings "America" by Neil Diamond. Desean Terry explains that it displays his breaking point, "The song choice is everything. That's one thing I will say about Daniel. Like, the song choice is everything, bro... It was a very interesting song choice. We were surprised, like, ‘Oh, Daniel, you like that song? OK." Kerry Ehrin chose the song after searching for many different options, although Terry himself did not know the lyrics. Terry added, "I love how people respond to it. [Some] people are cheering, some people are like, “Oh, my God my stomach hurt the entire time. What are you doing?!”"

== Critical reviews ==
"Kill the Fatted Calf" received mixed to positive reviews from critics.

Linda Holmes of NPR wrote, "the show is sort of not clear about whether he's trying to blow up his career or show off his charisma, but Daniel takes advantage of a sudden opening in the show to sing Neil Diamond's "America." Everyone is gobsmacked, and I don't know whether we're supposed to believe that a live show has no plan in place if they need to fade out a person singing a song and vamp to fill some time, nor do I think a live show would just let you sing an unplanned song on a live broadcast without... you know, securing the music rights? These people sometimes feel like Martians. Martians who have never done television before."

Lacy Baugher of Telltale TV gave the episode a 3.5 star rating out of 5 and wrote, "Don't get me wrong, I truly do enjoy The Morning Show. But I also truly do believe that this series — and its viewers — would be so much better off if they simply stopped acting like the show is A Very Serious Prestige Drama." Claire Di Maio of The Young Folks gave the episode an 8 out of 10 and wrote, "All in all, “Killing the Fatted Calf” introduces more conflict, but balances it well. It's a quietly dynamic episode, and there's a lot changing — not at the daytime program, but at The Morning Show as a series itself. That's a great thing. As we move into the middle of the season, maybe the best really is yet to come."
