= Stacy Osei-Kuffour =

American playwright, actress, and writer

- Born: April 18, 1987 (age 39); Chicago, Illinois, U.S.
- Occupations: Playwright, actress, writer
- Years active: 2010–present

Stacy Amma Osei-Kuffour (born April 18, 1987) is an American playwright, actress, and writer known for her work on Watchmen and PEN15.

She was nominated for an Primetime Emmy Award in 2019 for PEN15 and received a Writers Guild of America Award for her work on Watchmen.

== Early life and education ==
Osei-Kuffour was born in Chicago, Illinois, the daughter of Denise Poindexter and Godwin Osei-Kuffour. Her mother, a schoolteacher, is Black American and her father, a business owner, is Ghanaian. Her culturally mixed heritage often figures in her work.

After attending at Homewood-Flossmoor High School in Flossmoor, Illinois, Osei-Kuffour studied at New York University's Tisch School of the Arts, where she majored in drama at the Stella Adler Studio of Acting. At NYU she met future collaborators Anna Konkle and Maya Erskine, both of whom she would later work with on PEN15. She also studied at the Royal Academy of Dramatic Art in London.

After graduating from NYU, she earned a Master's degree in playwriting from Hunter College. Her one-act play One Course won the Irv Zarkower Award at Hunter in 2014.

== Career ==
After trying for six years to break into the New York City theater scene, Osei-Kuffour moved to Los Angeles to pursue acting and writing there. She also appeared in three episodes of Accountability Partners. She also continued writing plays, with several being produced. Her play Hang Man premiered in her Chicago home town in the spring of 2018. The COVID-19 pandemic halted the scheduled premiere of her play Animals at the Williamstown Theater Festival in Massachusetts, but the festival produced it as an audio play in December 2020 starring William Jackson Harper and Aja Naomi King.

In 2018, she was a staff writer on Syfy's Happy!. In 2019 she received an Emmy nomination in the Outstanding Writing for a Comedy Series category for the "Anna Ishii-Peters" episode of Hulu's PEN15. She was the only African American woman nominated in that category that year, and the third ever to be nominated, after Lena Waithe (who won for Master of None) and Stefani Robinson for Atlanta.

The same year, she was tapped as a member of an all-female writing team for Amazon's series The Power starring Leslie Mann and based on the novel by Naomi Alderman. She also worked as a supervising producer on Apple TV's The Morning Show.

In 2020, her work as a story editor and writer for the HBO series Watchmen earned her a Writers Guild Award (WGA) for Best New Series. Also that year, she worked as a story editor on Run for HBO and for Amazon’s Hunters.

In January 2020 Hulu tapped her to co-write, with Nnedi Okorafor, a television adaptation of Okorafor's science fiction novella Binti.

In February 2021, it was announced that Osei-Kuffour would write the script for the Blade film reboot starring Mahershala Ali, before she was replaced by Michael Starrbury in November 2022.

She continued her television work in 2021 as well, writing for the Amazon anthology series Solos.

== Filmography ==
Year	Title	Notes
2018	Happy!	Staff writer
2019	PEN15	Wrote: "Anna Ishii-Peters"
2019	Watchmen	Wrote: "An Almost Religious Awe"
2019	The Morning Show	Producer, wrote: "A Private Person"
2020	Hunters	Story editor
2020	Run	Story editor
2021	Solos	Wrote: "NERA"
2023	The Power	Wrote: "Sparklefingers"
2023	The Bear	Supervising producer, wrote: "Honeydew"
2025	Black Rabbit	Co-executive producer, wrote: "Trailblazer"

=== As actress ===
Year	Title	Role	Notes
2010	Death (A Love Story)	Clown	Short film
2014	The Oscar Panel	Chiwetel	Short film
2014	Plant	Judge #2	Episode: "The Brood's All Here"
2015	There Are Ghosts	Unknown	Short film
2017	Accountability Partners	Jessica	3 episodes
2018	Balloon Room	Hillary Clinton	
2019	PEN15	Mrs. Osei-Kuffour	Episode: "Anna Ishii-Peters"
2020	I Think You'd Be Great	Kendall	Short film

== Awards and nominations ==
Year	Award	Category	Nominated work	Result	Ref.
2019	Primetime Emmy Awards	Outstanding Writing for a Comedy Series	PEN15 (for "Anna Ishii-Peters")	Nominated	
2020	Writers Guild of America Awards	New Series	Watchmen	Won	
2020	Writers Guild of America Awards	Drama Series	Watchmen	Nominated	
2020	Writers Guild of America Awards	Comedy Series	PEN15	Nominated	
2020	Writers Guild of America Awards	New Series	PEN15	Nominated	
