= Play the Queen =

- The Morning Show episode
- Episode no.: Season 1 Episode 9
- Directed by: Kevin Bray
- Written by: Erica Lipez; Ali Vingiano
- Cinematography by: David Lanzenberg
- Editing by: Ron Rosen; Peter Ellis
- Original release date: December 13, 2019
- Running time: 60 minutes

Guest appearances
- Maria Sharapova as Herself (special guest star); Marcia Gay Harden as Maggie Brener (special guest star); Tom Irwin as Fred Micklen

Episode chronology
← Previous "Lonely at the Top"	Next → "The Interview"

"Play the Queen" is the ninth episode of the American drama television series The Morning Show, inspired by Brian Stelter's 2013 book Top of the Morning. The episode was written by co-executive producer Erica Lipez and Ali Vingiano, and directed by Kevin Bray. It was released on Apple TV+ on December 13, 2019.

The series follows the characters and culture behind a network broadcast morning news program, The Morning Show. After allegations of sexual misconduct, the male co-anchor of the program, Mitch Kessler, is forced off the show. It follows Mitch's co-host, Alex Levy, and a conservative reporter Bradley Jackson, who attracts the attention of the show's producers after a viral video. In the episode, Mitch tries to get Hannah to help corroborate his story, while Claire makes a decision in her future with Yanko.

The episode received generally positive reviews from critics, who praised the performances, character development and ending.

== Plot ==
Mitch (Steve Carell) meets with Hannah (Gugu Mbatha-Raw) outside her apartment. He believes she had sex with him to get the head booker position, and he wants a favor from her; he wants her to tip reporters that Fred (Tom Irwin) covered his behavior. Hannah is hesitant as it could end her career, but Mitch insists.

Bradley (Reese Witherspoon) visits Alex (Jennifer Aniston), informing her about her planned interview with Mitch. Alex is upset, as she did not tell her earlier, but Bradley is certain she would not approve. While Alex discusses the situation with Fred, Bradley goes with Cory (Billy Crudup). Fred tells Alex that they must work together to protect the integrity of the show, which includes firing Bradley and Chip (Mark Duplass) in the process, which Alex approves. With Chip and Bradley out, Alex hopes that Daniel (Desean Terry) can now become co-host, and he is willing to help her.

With HR now aware of their relationship, Yanko (Néstor Carbonell) hopes he and Claire (Bel Powley) can enjoy a public romantic life. Nevertheless, Claire still feels unsure of their future. Claire meets with Hannah to express her reservations, but is shocked when Hannah reveals that she reported them to HR, as she feared Claire could jeopardize her career. Claire is upset and defends her relationship, finally deciding to go dining with Yanko. However, Claire feels hesitation when someone judges her in the entrance and finally expresses her situation to Yanko. They agree to break up, as Claire feels she is just starting her career.

Alex visits Mitch at his apartment, making it clear the interview will not happen as it can negatively impact the perception of the network and Alex herself. Mitch states the crusade is not against her, but Alex states she is willing to claim that Mitch had sex with her while drunk if he goes forward with the interview. Chip meets with Cory to fight against getting Mitch on the show but is heartbroken when he is informed that Alex wanted to get him fired. Hannah confronts Mitch about how powerless she felt during their sexual encounter only for him to berate her for her naiveté. Hannah reluctantly agrees to corroborate how Fred enabled her promotion but wants to remain anonymous. After calling Alex, Chip decides to produce the interview with Mitch.

== Development ==
=== Production ===
The episode was written by co-executive producer Erica Lipez and Ali Vingiano, and directed by Kevin Bray. This was Lipez's first writing credit, Vingiano's second writing credit, and Bray's first directing credit.

== Critical reviews ==
"Play the Queen" received generally positive reviews from critics. Maggie Fremont of Vulture gave the episode a 3 star rating out of 5 and wrote, "How terrible can Mitch Kessler get? I'm very happy to be back in the present day after our excursion to the not so distant past, since here, at least, everyone is aware of his depravity. Well, everyone but him."

Jodi Walker of Entertainment Weekly wrote, "Improving is not the worst thing a new series could do. In fact, it is perhaps the second-best thing a series could do, just after being flat-out consistently good. I stand by my original assessment that The Morning Show is not a great TV, but it is compelling TV, and sometimes that’s just as enjoyable. But where great and compelling finally met (albeit with a nauseating rush of reality) on The Morning Show was in last week’s hourlong flashback to life before the reckoning of Mitch Kessler’s misdeeds — back when he was using his power and influence to manipulate young women, and UBA was happily sweeping up behind him."

Meaghan O'Keefe of Decider complimented Crudup's acting, "None of this would be so interesting without Crudup's commitment to the role. He, too, seems to be having a blast playing Cory Ellison. There's a mercurial energy to his movements I haven't in his work before. (sic) It's electric and exciting and honestly the best reason to keep tuning into The Morning Show as it gets ready to wrap up its final season."

Esme Mazzeo of Telltale TV gave the episode a 4-star rating out of 5 and wrote, "Only one team will with the game, although right now Mitch is winning a completely different game. In an effort to keep their jobs, no one seems to care they’re being played." Veronique Englebert of The Review Geek gave the episode a 3.5 star rating out of 5 and wrote, "The different interactions between all the characters remains really intriguing and the excellent chemistry they deliver has definitely helped the show become quite enjoyable."
