= Ghosts (The Morning Show) =

- The Morning Show episode
- Episode no.: Season 2 Episode 5
- Directed by: Tucker Gates
- Written by: Erica Lipez; Adam Milch
- Cinematography by: John Brawley
- Editing by: Ron Rosen
- Original release date: October 15, 2021
- Running time: 55 minutes

Guest appearances
- Mindy Kaling as Audra Khatri (special guest star); Marcia Gay Harden as Maggie Brener (special guest star); Valeria Golino as Paola Lambruschini (special guest star); David Paymer as Mr. Shoenfeld; Tom Irwin as Fred Micklen; Jack Conley as Earl; Hasan Minhaj as Eric Nomani; Katie Aselton as Madeleine; Hannah Leder as Isabella; Victoria Tate as Rena Robinson; Shari Belafonte as Julia; Eli Bildner as Joel Rapkin; Amber Friendly as Layla Bell; Michelle Meredith as Lindsey Sherman

Episode chronology
← Previous "Kill the Fatted Calf"	Next → "A Private Person"

"Ghosts" is the fifth episode of the second season of the American drama television series The Morning Show, inspired by Brian Stelter's 2013 book Top of the Morning. It is the fifteenth overall episode of the series and was written by executive producers Erica Lipez and Adam Milch, and directed by Tucker Gates. It was released on Apple TV+ on October 15, 2021.

The series follows the characters and culture behind a network broadcast morning news program, The Morning Show. After allegations of sexual misconduct, the male co-anchor of the program, Mitch Kessler, is forced off the show. It follows Mitch's co-host, Alex Levy, and a conservative reporter Bradley Jackson, who attracts the attention of the show's producers after a viral video. In the episode, Alex faces anxiety as Maggie's book will be published soon, while Cory tries to get Hannah's family to cooperate.

The episode received generally positive reviews from critics, with praise towards the performances, although some criticized the pacing.

== Plot ==
Cory (Billy Crudup) calls Fred (Tom Irwin) to stop trying to smear Hannah's image. Fred maintains the stories are true, and suggests Cory will face severe consequences when Maggie (Marcia Gay Harden) publishes her book, which will detail how he paid Fred to leave the network, if he can't make Hannah's family accept the deal.

As she prepares for the debate, Alex (Jennifer Aniston) is approached by Audra (Mindy Kaling), who reveals that Maggie's book will start her press tour at YDA. As she, Bradley (Reese Witherspoon), Chip (Mark Duplass) and Eric (Hasan Minhaj) leave for Las Vegas to participate in the 2020 Democratic Party presidential primaries, Alex begins experiencing back pain. Despite Yanko (Néstor Carbonell) apologizing for his "spirit animal" comment, Mia (Karen Pittman) does not believe he is sincere. To make up for it, she and Stella (Greta Lee) have arranged for Yanko to go to Florida and film activities with the Seminole. While Yanko is willing to do it, he dislikes the idea of filming it.

In Italy, Mitch (Steve Carell) and Paola (Valeria Golino) are quarantined together, finishing the documentary. While Paola makes advances on Mitch, he makes it clear their relationship is strictly professional. She convinces him to give her an interview, claiming it will be solely for her. During the interview, Mitch opens up about his past with Hannah, expressing remorse for his actions. Specifically, he laments having used Hannah to try to get back at the network, leading to her suicide, which he considers the worst thing he ever did.

Cory visits Hannah's father (David Paymer) in Green Bay, Wisconsin, warning him the smear campaign will be awful if he does not accept the settlement, but his plea is ignored. He informs Bradley of the lawsuit situation, and asks her if he should do anything in his power to stop the smear campaign, to which she immediately agrees. As Stella walks on the street, a man makes racist remarks due to the COVID-19 pandemic, telling her to go back to China. Seeing this, Yanko confronts the man and they engage in a fight, unaware that bystanders have recorded it. Unable to sleep, Alex visits Maggie to discuss the details in her book, who confirms that the book addresses a claim made by Laura (Julianna Margulies): that Alex had an affair with Mitch. Alex asks her to not include it, but the book is finished. Maggie also states that she asked Mitch about it, but he was not cooperative. Distracted, Alex ditches the debate, forcing Bradley to replace her. Alex is seen in the private plane, heading to an unknown destination.

== Development ==
=== Production ===
The episode was written by executive producers Erica Lipez and Adam Milch, and directed by Tucker Gates. This was Lipez's fourth writing credit, Milch's third writing credit, and Gates' second directing credit.

== Critical reviews ==
"Ghosts" received generally positive reviews from critics. Maggie Fremont of Vulture gave the episode a 4 star rating out of 5 and wrote, "If she says that he should do whatever it takes, no matter what, to stop the Hannah stories from coming out, then he'll know it's the right decision. Of course, she says, protect Hannah at all costs. She doesn't yet know that “all costs” means Cory will trade Hannah's story for the story of Bradley and Laura secretly sleeping together. It is a real dick move to say the absolute least. Everyone is terrible! If only we could all hop on Alex's private plane and fly far, far away!"

Chike Coleman of We Live Entertainment gave the episode an 8 out of 10 rating and wrote, "Ultimately this episode was about the things we can't run away from and how as much as we fight it, we have to remember that we define where things go next in any part of our lives. The sooner every character realizes that and makes their move, the better. The clock is ticking, and Covid-19 is coming. Let's hope every major player makes their decisions soon."

Lacy Baugher of Telltale TV gave the episode a 3 star rating out of 5 and wrote, "The Morning Show Season 2 Episode 5, “Ghosts,” marks the halfway point of the new season, and in many ways, it still feels like the show is spinning its wheels. Everything is moving so slowly that I'm not entirely sure what its larger arc is meant to be, or what stories it's particularly interested in telling." Claire Di Maio of The Young Folks gave the episode a 6 out of 10 and wrote, "For it to have taken five episodes for the Schoenfelds to appear onscreen is a bit distasteful given how important Hannah's death is to the story. There's one thing for sure in this episode, though: seeds of drama have been planted, which will hopefully allow for a speedy (and soapy) rest of the season."
