= Open Waters (The Morning Show) =

- The Morning Show episode
- Episode no.: Season 1 Episode 7
- Directed by: Roxann Dawson
- Written by: Jeff Augustin
- Cinematography by: David Lanzenberg
- Editing by: Ron Rosen
- Original release date: November 29, 2019
- Running time: 57 minutes

Guest appearances
- Mindy Kaling as Audra Khatri (special guest star); Marcia Gay Harden as Maggie Brener (special guest star); Janina Gavankar as Alison Namazi; Tom Irwin as Fred Micklen

Episode chronology
← Previous "The Pendulum Swings"	Next → "Lonely at the Top"

"Open Waters" is the seventh episode of the American drama television series The Morning Show, inspired by Brian Stelter's 2013 book Top of the Morning. The episode was written by Jeff Augustin, and directed by Roxann Dawson. It was released on Apple TV+ on November 29, 2019.

The series follows the characters and culture behind a network broadcast morning news program, The Morning Show. After allegations of sexual misconduct, the male co-anchor of the program, Mitch Kessler, is forced off the show. It follows Mitch's co-host, Alex Levy, and a conservative reporter Bradley Jackson, who attracts the attention of the show's producers after a viral video. In the episode, Mitch tries to get Bradley to accept an interview to expose the executives, while Alex faces a crisis while announcing her divorce.

The episode received generally positive reviews from critics, who praised the character development and performances.

== Plot ==
Bradley (Reese Witherspoon) meets with Mitch (Steve Carell) at a park. Mitch states that he can provide a testimony where he can reveal everyone who was aware of his scandal, which he is willing to share if she interviews him on the show. Bradley does not like the idea as Mitch wants to use the interview to "exonerate" himself, but he states that he has a witness; a woman who slept with him and, in his words, used him to get a promotion.

Alex (Jennifer Aniston) and Jason (Jack Davenport) tell their daughter, Lizzy (Oona Roche), about their divorce. Lizzy does not take the news well and blames Alex for it. While discussing the incoming segments for the show, one of the writers, Nicky Brooks (David Magidoff), makes a crude remark about Mia (Karen Pittman) sleeping with Mitch, prompting Chip (Mark Duplass) to fire him. Mia has a meltdown and confirms to the entire studio that she was involved with Mitch. Yanko (Néstor Carbonell) and Claire (Bel Powley) are questioned by Human Resources as suspicions of their relationship arise. During their separate interviews with HR, Yanko and Claire both come clean about their relationship, but Claire grows defensive against the representative's questions and storms out. While Yanko is relieved that their secret is out, Claire is worried that she might lose her job.

Alex visits Lizzy at her dorm room to try to explain her decision, but Lizzy is unwilling to listen. As Alex tries to calm her, Lizzy finally proclaims that she will not take care of her during her emotional crisis, and that she should just say it to the country instead. Furious by her daughter's remarks, Alex goes on a tirade and scolds Lizzie for not appreciating anything she did for her, including trying to repair her failed marriage for her sake. Bradley calls Mitch, telling him she is willing to do the interview if he can corroborate the story. Mitch subsequently leaves to visit Hannah (Gugu Mbatha-Raw), telling her that she now must repay the favor.

== Development ==
=== Production ===
The episode was written by Jeff Augustin, and directed by Roxann Dawson. This was Augustin's first writing credit, and Dawson's first directing credit.

== Critical reviews ==
"Open Waters" received generally positive reviews from critics. Maggie Fremont of Vulture gave the episode a 3 star rating out of 5 and wrote, "It feels appropriate that “Open Waters” airs the week of Thanksgiving, a holiday that, with its potent mix of extended family members, free-flowing booze, and a truly overwhelming amount of meat, always runs the risk of ending in a full-on family meltdown, because that's exactly what's going on at The Morning Show this week: People are melting the hell down."

Jodi Walker of Entertainment Weekly wrote, "Its seventh episode paints a picture of a group of people who have spent years of their lives protecting a corporation that they're now realizing will never protect them back. The Morning Show has taken up all the space in these people's consciousness, so much so that it's pushed them out of their own lives." Morgan Baila of Refinery29 wrote, "There have been a few notable meltdowns in this season of The Morning Show, but episode 7 is basically one long therapy session. Now that the cast is back from the fiery Malibu coast, they face a new danger: Open waters."

Esme Mazzeo of Telltale TV gave the episode a 4 star rating out of 5 and wrote, "Whatever metaphor you choose, watching that tension build and waiting for it to explode is emotionally draining. Sadly for fans, torturing us via fiction makes streaming sites money — it's just how TV works. So, we have to live with it for now." Veronique Englebert of The Review Geek gave the episode a 3 star rating out of 5 and wrote, "While we're offered a slightly slower episode this week, The Morning Show remains quite entertaining as we slowly see people crack under the pressure."
