= No One's Gonna Harm You, Not While I'm Around =

- The Morning Show episode
- Episode no.: Season 1 Episode 5
- Directed by: David Frankel
- Written by: Torrey Speer
- Cinematography by: David Lanzenberg
- Editing by: Vikash Patel; Elliott Eisman
- Original release date: November 15, 2019
- Running time: 66 minutes

Guest appearances
- Mindy Kaling as Audra Khatri (special guest star); Marcia Gay Harden as Maggie Brener (special guest star); David Morse as Mr. Jackson (special guest star); Janina Gavankar as Alison Namazi; Tom Irwin as Fred Micklen

Episode chronology
| ← Previous "That Woman" | Next → "The Pendulum Swings" |

"No One's Gonna Harm You, Not While I'm Around" is the fifth episode of the American drama television series The Morning Show, inspired by Brian Stelter's 2013 book Top of the Morning. The episode was written by producer Torrey Speer, and directed by David Frankel. It was released on Apple TV+ on November 15, 2019.

The series follows the characters and culture behind a network broadcast morning news program, The Morning Show. After allegations of sexual misconduct, the male co-anchor of the program, Mitch Kessler, is forced off the show. It follows Mitch's co-host, Alex Levy, and a conservative reporter Bradley Jackson, who attracts the attention of the show's producers after a viral video. In the episode, Mitch tries to get the staff to speak on his behalf when a new article on him is about to drop.

The episode received generally positive reviews from critics, with praise towards the performances, but criticizing the pacing and characterization.

== Plot ==
After Bradley (Reese Witherspoon) finishes her first week, the staff is surprised when Mitch (Steve Carell) suddenly arrives. As The New York Times is writing a story on one of his victims, Mitch pleads for the staff to speak positively of him, but they all ignore him. As Mitch is escorted out by security, Bradley confronts him and asks who else knew about the scandal; he simply responds, "What do you think?"

Fearing the network could be exposed, Cory (Billy Crudup), Chip (Mark Duplass) and Fred (Tom Irwin) try to get the Times to drop the story in exchange for an exclusive regarding Mitch's visit, but they refuse. When the weekend hits, Alex (Jennifer Aniston) hosts a charity fundraiser to maintain her image. Nevertheless, she becomes disappointed when Bradley becomes the center of attention. Alex then talks with reporter Maggie Brener (Marcia Gay Harden), insinuating that Bradley's success is due to Alex herself, but Maggie does not buy it. To cheer her up, Cory gets Alex to sing "Not While I'm Around" with him, but Alex ends up leaving the party early.

Meanwhile, Bradley decides to join her female colleagues to celebrate Claire's birthday at a bar. The celebration soon turns heated when Claire (Bel Powley) harshly insults Mitch, leading a defensive Mia (Karen Pittman) to proclaim that Mitch was "complicated" before leaving. After receiving an unexpected phone call from her estranged father (David Morse), Bradley has sex with a man at the bar, and she later gets Cory to help her return to her hotel room. Meanwhile, a dejected Alex meets with Mitch in his car to explain her situation. Mitch suggests they could both flee together, but Alex is unsure. Mitch also apologizes for his actions, and they share a kiss. Suddenly, the Times article drops; while the testimony is detailed, the network is not implicated, and Mitch is enraged that Fred has ceased defending his actions. After Alex leaves, Mitch calls Fred, proclaiming that he will go down with him.

== Development ==
=== Production ===
The episode was written by producer Torrey Speer, and directed by David Frankel. This was Speer's first writing credit, and Frankel's second directing credit.

=== Music ===
The episode features a scene where Alex and Cory sing "Not While I'm Around" from Sweeney Todd: The Demon Barber of Fleet Street. On the choice of the song, Kerry Ehrin said, "I thought the idea of doing a beautiful song about protection of someone you love would be the way you could mock someone the most that you do not love."

Billy Crudup commented, "There were some really complex interpersonal things that we had to make sure that we navigated, as well as the technical part of making sure to sing in sync so that they can use your voice live if possible. So all of it was kind of a whirlwind for me. I did find myself on the second day of filming, when they were [shooting] the other characters watching us, when we're not on camera, I did find little moments of joy for myself in the fact that I was sitting there and getting a chance to sing Sondheim with Jen, which was a remarkable turn in my career. So that was a welcomed privilege for me."

== Critical reviews ==
"No One's Gonna Harm You, Not While I'm Around" received generally positive reviews from critics. Maggie Fremont of Vulture gave the episode a 3 star rating out of 5 and wrote, "if you think that by the end of the show Alex is over Bradley questioning whether she knew about what Mitch was up to, you are extremely wrong."

Jodi Walker of Entertainment Weekly wrote, "The fifth episode of The Morning Show is all about the ensemble scene. Whether it's zipping down UBA hallways, drinking in a Midtown Irish pub that I can't imagine a group of cool media women would be caught dead in, or swanning around your own packed penthouse while Cheyenne Jackson sings show tunes for charity, there's a lot of togetherness in this episode. And that means there's a lot of loaded talking (and occasionally, singing)." Meghan O'Keefe of Decider wrote, "She keeps up the appearances that everything is fine behind-the-scenes, or within the subtext of a song. But they're not. It's a coup de grace from Cory Ellison, and a sign that Alex's career may be in even more peril than she thinks."

Esme Mazzeo of Telltale TV gave the episode a 4 star rating out of 5 and wrote, "It's a brilliantly crafted episode — from the title to the chronology of events to the settings — it's absolutely clear what has begun." Veronique Englebert of The Review Geek gave the episode a 3.5 star rating out of 5 and wrote, "The excellent performance from the cast remain the focus of the show here, which is greatly helped by the realistic dialogue and individual character arcs."
