= That Woman (The Morning Show) =

- The Morning Show episode
- Episode no.: Season 1 Episode 4
- Directed by: Lynn Shelton
- Written by: Adam Milch
- Cinematography by: Michael Grady
- Editing by: Carole Kravetz Aykanian
- Original release date: November 8, 2019
- Running time: 51 minutes

Guest appearances
- Kelly Clarkson as Herself (special guest star); Janina Gavankar as Alison Namazi; Tom Irwin as Fred Micklen; Brett Butler as Sandy Jackson

Episode chronology
← Previous "Chaos Is the New Cocaine"	Next → "No One's Gonna Harm You, Not While I'm Around"

"That Woman" is the fourth episode of the American drama television series The Morning Show, inspired by Brian Stelter's 2013 book Top of the Morning. The episode was written by co-executive producer Adam Milch, and directed by Lynn Shelton. It was released on Apple TV+ on November 8, 2019.

The series follows the characters and culture behind a network broadcast morning news program, The Morning Show. After allegations of sexual misconduct, the male co-anchor of the program, Mitch Kessler, is forced off the show. It follows Mitch's co-host, Alex Levy, and a conservative reporter Bradley Jackson, who attracts the attention of the show's producers after a viral video. In the episode, Bradley begins her tenure at the show with a controversial remark, while preparing to interview one of Mitch's victims.

The episodes received positive reviews from critics, with many praising Witherspoon's performance, character development and lack of focus on Mitch.

== Plot ==
Bradley (Reese Witherspoon) makes her debut on The Morning Show by talking with Alex (Jennifer Aniston) about her childhood. Chafing at the rosy scripted persona the show has given her, Bradley goes off-script and relates her personal struggles growing up, including the fact that she had an abortion when she was 15. The revelation angers Fred (Tom Irwin) and the network executives as sponsors begin to exit the show.

The following day, Bradley issues an apology, but the show continues losing sponsors. Fred instructs against letting Bradley interview Ashley Brown (Ahna O'Reilly), but Alex convinces him into giving her a second chance. Despite Fred's concerns, Cory (Billy Crudup) is delighted to learn that Bradley's revelation has increased the show's younger demographic, to the point that students in Mississippi have incited pro-choice marches in support of Bradley. Meanwhile, the TMS staff is interviewed by Vicki Manderly (Kelly Sullivan), a representative from the human resources department investigating Mitch's actions. Most of the employees state that they were unaware of Mitch's misconduct, although Mia (Karen Pittman) reveals that she had an affair with Mitch, which ended when she asked to cut it off. The internal investigation also causes Yanko (Néstor Carbonell) and Claire (Bel Powley) to consider the potential power imbalance in their relationship.

Bradley conducts the interview with Ashley, using questions approved by the network. Ashley explains that Mitch touched her thigh, which happened more than once; the confusion led to her deciding to quit and not report him. Bradley then deviates from the script and questions if the network was involved in the scandal, upsetting Alex and the staff. Ashley publicly reveals that she performed oral sex on Mitch, and that the staff was aware of it. Following the interview, Alex confronts Bradley for her actions, but she accuses her of knowing about Mitch's misconduct. Alex is offended by the comment and angrily storms out.

== Development ==
=== Production ===
The episode was written by co-executive producer Adam Milch, and directed by Lynn Shelton. This was Milch's first writing credit, and Shelton's first directing credit.

=== Writing ===
With the inclusion of abortion in the episode, Kerry Ehrin said, "You wanted Bradley's first on-air experience to be hugely upsetting. I guess that is how I would describe it. It needed to feel like, ‘Oh my god. Ok, so that's what happens when you get that person on a morning show.'"

=== Casting ===
On her performance, Reese Witherspoon said, "When you watch episodes 1, 2, and 3, look around and look at every character. There are going to be people who, their whole character is going to be such a shocking revelation. It's so great! Something happens to me at the very beginning of episode 4 that is one of my favorite things I've ever gotten to play. It was an emotion I've never played before in my entire life. That's really cool."

== Critical reviews ==
"That Woman" received positive reviews from critics. Maggie Fremont of Vulture gave the episode a 4 star rating out of 5 and wrote, "Without a doubt, the first ten minutes of “That Woman” are the best ten minutes of The Morning Show so far. I mean, long live Alex Levy Getting Fed Up in Her Red Coat, but what goes down from the point when Alex introduces Bradley to The Morning Show audience until Bradley lies facedown on the floor of her dressing room is perfection."

Jodi Walker of Entertainment Weekly wrote, "Do I think it's a coincidence that The Morning Show's best episode yet was a Mitch-less hour? Reader, you will not be surprised to hear that I do not." Meghan O'Keefe of Decider wrote, "By admitting to having an abortion, Bradley has made herself a target of pro-life groups, a pain for advertisers, and a symbol of courage to young women fighting for their rights. And by kicking off their first episode with this controversial topic, Apple TV+'s The Morning Show is signaling that it's not afraid of divisive drama. In fact, it's obsessed with it."

Esme Mazzeo of Telltale TV gave the episode a 3.5 star rating out of 5 and wrote, "So, it remains to be seen if catfights and industry politics will continue to reign over a more emotional, raw story angle. But at least The Morning Show is getting less boring." Veronique Englebert of The Review Geek gave the episode a 3.5 star rating out of 5 and wrote, "The Morning Show gives us another strong episode this week, concentrating more on Bradley's character as she's determined to put her personal stamp on the show, gaining the approval of America by showing her true self. The episode does a great job building tension too, climaxing in an interview which will cause serious shock-waves in the weeks to come."
