= Studio floor manager =

Member of the crew of a television show

A floor manager or floor director is a member of the crew of a television show. The floor manager is responsible for giving information from the director in the control room, to the crew on the studio floor, and then back to the director.

== Duties ==
- Ensure all equipment is working on the set, before and during show
- Ensure on air talent's hair, put microphones, and clothing are in working order and presentable for camera
- Ensure set is clean and free of debris that might show up on camera
- Inform director and producer of off-camera action
- Understand entire show in order to make changes when needed to set, props, etc.
- Brief talent/guests on what to expect during show
- Help plan the show
- Deal with light & sound adjustment during show
- Deal with technical issues and change batteries during show
- If there is an audience, seat them, manage them during show, cue them

Floor managers working for news productions must have flexible working hours. They may need to work on weekends, extended hours, or even travel to different locations depending on the show's needs. They can typically dress in casual but appropriate attire, depending on the setting.

== Skills/qualities ==
Floor managers traditionally have other experience working in television, and work up to the position of floor manager. They should know the other technical positions in a studio, in order to have the maturity and experience to do their job effectively. Media, film, television, or even theater studies are helpful but not required. Floor managers must be able to work under pressure with composure, anticipate potential problems and know how to address them, communicate effectively and quickly, be able to work with different personalities, and know how to multitask. Floor managers require a good sense of timing and space.
