= List of awards and nominations received by Jane Lynch =

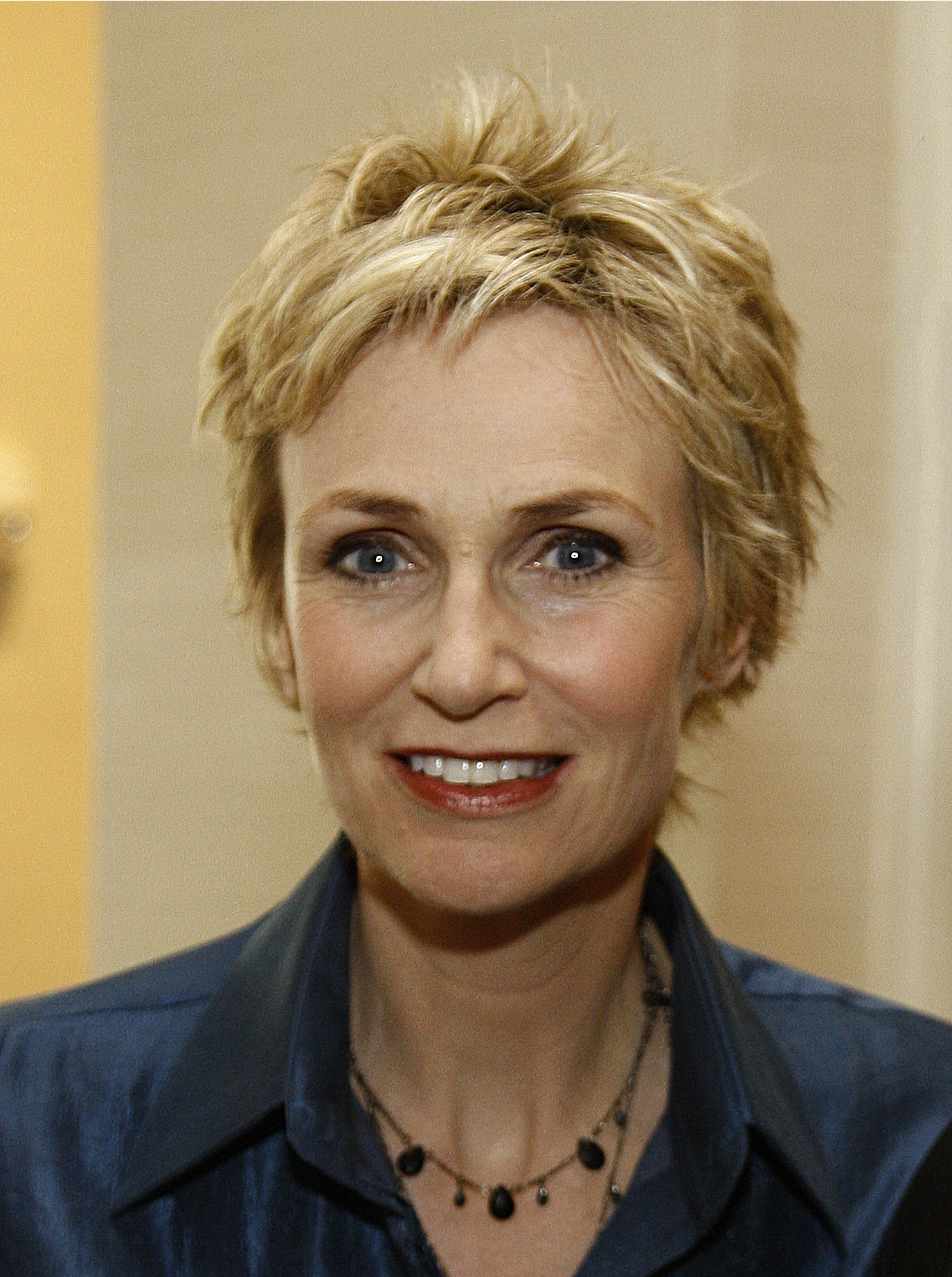
- Lynch at the Peabody 2010

Jane Lynch is an American actress.

She is known for her comedic work in film and television in particular Glee (2010-2015), and The Marvelous Mrs. Maisel (2017–present). For playing Sue Sylvester in Glee, she won a Primetime Emmy Award, Golden Globe Award, Screen Actors Guild Award, TCA Award, Satellite Award, and People's Choice Award. Lynch has received five Primetime Emmy Awards from thirteen nominations, two Screen Actors Guild Awards from six nominations, and a Golden Globe Award from two nominations.

== Main associations ==
=== Emmy Awards ===
Year	Category	Nominated work	Result	Ref.
2010	Outstanding Guest Actress in a Comedy Series	Two and a Half Men	Nominated	
2010	Outstanding Supporting Actress in a Comedy Series	Glee (episode: "The Power of Madonna")	Won	
2011	Outstanding Supporting Actress in a Comedy Series	Glee (episode: "Funeral")	Nominated	
2013	Outstanding Supporting Actress in a Comedy Series	Glee (episode: "Feud")	Nominated	
2014	Outstanding Narrator	Wildlife Specials: The Spy Collection	Nominated	
2014	Outstanding Host for a Reality or Competition Program	Hollywood Game Night (season two)	Won	
2015	Outstanding Host for a Reality or Competition Program	Hollywood Game Night (season three)	Won	
2016	Outstanding Host for a Reality or Competition Program	Hollywood Game Night (season four)	Nominated	
2017	Outstanding Actress in a Short Form Series	Dropping the Soap	Won	
2018	Outstanding Host for a Reality or Competition Program	Hollywood Game Night (season five)	Nominated	
2018	Outstanding Guest Actress in a Comedy Series	The Marvelous Mrs. Maisel (episode: "Put That on Your Plate!")	Nominated	
2019	Outstanding Guest Actress in a Comedy Series	The Marvelous Mrs. Maisel (episode: "Vote for Kennedy!")	Won	
2022	Outstanding Guest Actress in a Comedy Series	Only Murders in the Building (episode: "Double Time")	Nominated	
2024	Outstanding Host for a Game Show	Weakest Link	Nominated	
Daytime Emmy Awards
2020	Outstanding Interactive Media for a Daytime Program	Macy's Thanksgiving Day Parade	Nominated	

=== Golden Globe Awards ===
Year	Category	Nominated work	Result	Ref.
2010	Best Supporting Actress – Television	Glee	Nominated	
2011	Best Supporting Actress – Television	Glee	Won	

=== Screen Actors Guild Awards ===
Year	Category	Nominated work	Result	Ref.
2010	Outstanding Ensemble in a Comedy Series	Glee	Won	
2011	Outstanding Actress in a Comedy Series	Glee	Nominated	
2011	Outstanding Ensemble in a Comedy Series	Glee	Nominated	
2012	Outstanding Ensemble in a Comedy Series	Glee	Nominated	
2013	Outstanding Ensemble in a Comedy Series	Glee	Nominated	
2020	Outstanding Ensemble in a Comedy Series	The Marvelous Mrs. Maisel	Won	

== Audience awards ==
=== Teen Choice Awards ===
Year	Category	Nominated work	Result	Ref.
2010	Choice TV Villain	Glee	Nominated	
2011	Choice TV Villain	Glee	Nominated	
2014	Choice TV Villain	Glee	Nominated	

=== People's Choice Awards ===
Year	Category	Nominated work	Result	Ref.
2011	Favorite TV Comedy Actress	Glee	Won	
2012	Favorite TV Comedy Actress	Glee	Nominated	
2013	Favorite TV Comedy Actress	Glee	Nominated	
2014	Favorite TV Comedy Actress	Glee	Nominated	

== Critics awards ==
=== Critics' Choice Awards ===
Year	Category	Nominated work	Result	Ref.
2011	Best Supporting Actress in a Comedy Series	Glee	Nominated	
2014	Best Reality Show Host	Hollywood Game Night	Nominated	

=== Television Critics Association Awards ===
Year	Category	Nominated work	Result	Ref.
2010	Individual Achievement in Comedy	Glee	Won	

=== Gotham Independent Film Awards ===
Year	Category	Nominated work	Result	Ref.
2006	Best Ensemble Cast	For Your Consideration	Nominated	

=== Florida Film Critics Circle ===
Year	Category	Nominated work	Result	Ref.
2003	Best Cast	A Mighty Wind	Won	

=== Ft. Lauderdale International Film Festival ===
Year	Category	Nominated work	Result	Ref.
2007	Best Actress Comedy	I Do & I Don't	Won	

== Miscellaneous awards ==
=== Dorian Awards ===
Year	Category	Nominated work	Result	Ref.
2009	TV Comedy Performance of the Year: Musical or Comedy	Glee	Won	
2013	TV Comedy Performance of the Year	Glee	Won	

=== Satellite Awards ===
Year	Category	Nominated work	Result	Ref.
2009	Best Supporting Actress – Television	Glee	Won	
2010	Best Supporting Actress – Television	Glee	Nominated	

== Honors ==
=== Hollywood Walk of Fame ===
Year	Category	Nominated work	Result	Ref.
2013	Television – 6640 Hollywood Blvd.	Herself	Honored	
