= Jane Lynch =

American actress (born 1960)

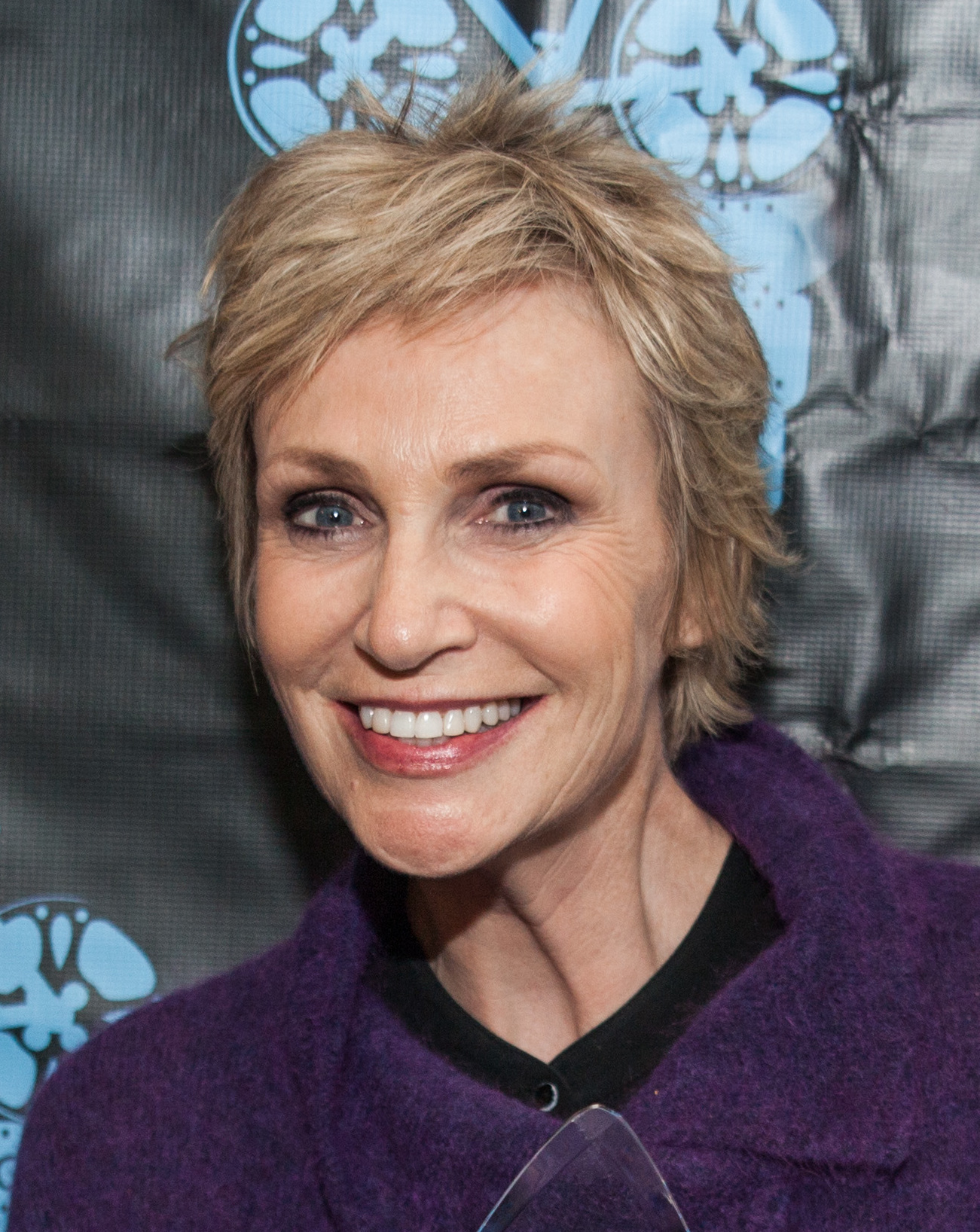
- Lynch at the 2016 Willfilm Awards
- Born: Jane Marie Lynch; July 14, 1960 (age 66); Evergreen Park, Illinois, U.S.
- Education: Illinois State University (BA); Cornell University (MFA)
- Occupations: Actress; comedian; singer; author; television presenter
- Years active: 1988–present
- Notable work: List of performances
- Spouses: Lara Embry (m. 2010; div. 2014) Jennifer Cheyne (m. 2021)
- Website: janelynchofficial.com

Jane Marie Lynch (born July 14, 1960) is an American actress, comedian, and singer. Known for playing starring and recurring roles in comedic television, her accolades include one Golden Globe, six Primetime Emmys and two Screen Actors Guild Awards. In 2013, Lynch received a star on the Hollywood Walk of Fame.

After appearing in the sitcom Two and a Half Men (2004–2014) and the drama series The L Word (2005–2009), Lynch achieved her breakthrough role as Sue Sylvester in the musical comedy series Glee (2009–2015). She then played recurring roles in the period comedy series The Marvelous Mrs. Maisel (2017–2023), the drama series The Good Fight (2017–2022), and the mystery comedy series Only Murders in the Building (2021–2025). In addition to acting on television, she hosted the game show Hollywood Game Night (2013–2020) and, since 2020, serves as the host and executive producer of the game show The Weakest Link (American version).

Lynch gained recognition for her collaborations with Christopher Guest, appearing in the mockumentary films Best in Show (2000), A Mighty Wind (2003), and For Your Consideration (2006). She has had roles in numerous mainstream comedy films, such as The 40-Year-Old Virgin (2005), Talladega Nights: The Ballad of Ricky Bobby (2006), Role Models (2008), Paul (2011), and The Three Stooges (2012). She has lent her voice to numerous animated films, including Space Chimps (2008), Ice Age: Dawn of the Dinosaurs (2009), Shrek Forever After (2010), Rio (2011), the Wreck-It Ralph film franchise (2012–2018), Escape from Planet Earth (2013), and UglyDolls (2019).

Lynch is also known for her stage work including her role in Nora Ephron's off-Broadway play Love, Loss, and What I Wore in 2009. She made her Broadway debut as Miss Hannigan in the revival of Annie in 2013. She returned to Broadway as Mrs. Brice in another revival, Funny Girl, in 2022.

== Early life ==
Jane Marie Lynch was born on July 14, 1960, in Evergreen Park, Illinois, and was raised in Dolton, Illinois, the daughter of a banker father, Frank Joseph Lynch, and a homemaker/secretary mother, Eileen Lynch (née Carney). Her father was of Irish descent, his parents having come from Sonnagh, near Charlestown, and Culduff, Killasser, near Swinford, both in County Mayo, and her mother was of Irish and Swedish ancestry. She was raised in a Catholic family and attended Thornridge High School. She graduated from Illinois State University in 1982 with a theater degree, and earned a master of fine arts degree from Cornell University in 1984.

== Career ==
=== Early work ===
Lynch spent 15 years in Chicago, acting in the Steppenwolf Theatre Company and, at the time of her audition, was one of only two women picked to join The Second City comedy troupe. She then continued to hone her comical and improvisational skills at Annoyance Theater, playing Carol Brady in the theater's The Real Live Brady Bunch. Andy Richter played Mike Brady in the New York shows. He and Lynch became very good friends.

=== Film work ===
Lynch got her start in films in 1988, playing a small role in the film Vice Versa. In 1993, she had a secondary role, as the doctor Kathy Wahlund, alongside Harrison Ford in The Fugitive. She also appeared, that same year, as a reporter in Fatal Instinct.

During the 1990s, she made numerous television commercials, including one for Frosted Flakes for an adult audience, directed by Christopher Guest. A few years later, Guest would remember Lynch as he chose actors for his 2000 dog show mockumentary Best in Show. Lynch played Christy Cummings, a butch lesbian personal dog handler to trophy wife Sheri Ann Cabot (Jennifer Coolidge). From there, she became a staple actress in Guest's casts, appearing in the director's A Mighty Wind (2003) as porn actress-turned-folk singer Laurie Bohner and in For Your Consideration (2006) as an entertainment reporter.

Audiences and critics took notice of Lynch for her turn in Judd Apatow's The 40-Year-Old Virgin. She told Fresh Air's Terry Gross that the role was originally intended for a man but also that, at the urging of Steve Carell's wife Nancy Walls, it was offered to Lynch instead. From there, she took supporting roles in a series of films including Role Models, Talladega Nights: The Ballad of Ricky Bobby, Alvin and the Chipmunks, Walk Hard: The Dewey Cox Story, Space Chimps, The Rocker, The Hammer, Another Cinderella Story, Ice Age: Dawn of the Dinosaurs, Wreck-It Ralph, and Spring Breakdown.

In Julie and Julia, she portrayed Dorothy McWilliams, Julia Child's sister. Entertainment Weekly dedicated an article on its website to the possibility of her performance receiving an Academy Award nomination. However, she was not nominated. She provided the voice of Bobbi St. Simone in The Venture Bros: Radiant Is the Blood of the Baboon Heart in 2023.

=== Television work ===
Lynch has appeared in many television series, including The X-Files, L.A. Law, Judging Amy, The West Wing, 7th Heaven, Glee, Desperate Housewives, Friends, NewsRadio, Married... with Children, 3rd Rock From The Sun, Dawson's Creek, Felicity, Arrested Development, Lovespring International, Two and a Half Men, Veronica Mars, Weeds, Boston Legal, L Word, Criminal Minds, Help Me Help You, Gilmore Girls, New Adventures of Old Christine, Psych, Monk, The Marvelous Mrs. Maisel, The King of Queens and Frasier. She also starred with John Hannah and William Fichtner in 2002's MDs and has appeared in the crime drama Criminal Minds as Spencer Reid's schizophrenic mother.

In 2008 she narrated Out & Proud in Chicago, a documentary which tells about LGBT life in Chicago from the Civil War to 2008 through the stories of 20 everyday Chicagoans, from age 30 to age 80.

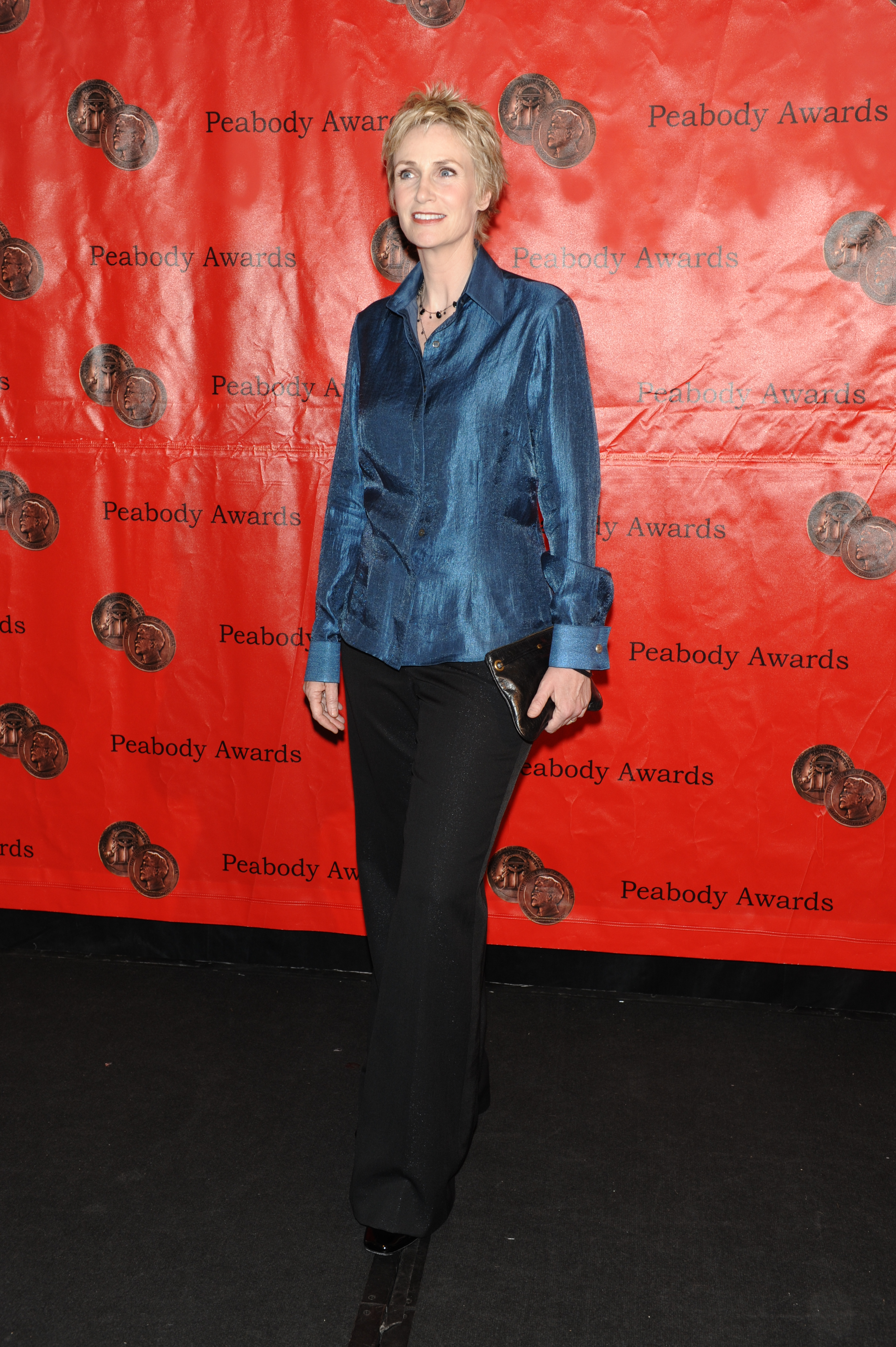
Jane Lynch at the 69th Annual Peabody Awards for Glee

Beginning in 2009, Lynch appeared as a regular cast member of the Fox series Glee. The role echoed previous guest appearances in The X-Files and Veronica Mars, being her third time cast as a harsh high school teacher. She won glowing reviews for her role as the aggressive cheerleading coach, Sue Sylvester. Mary McNamara of the Los Angeles Times wrote, "Lynch alone makes Glee worth watching." Before her work with Glee, she was a series regular on the Starz comedy Party Down. Though the series was renewed for a second season, Lynch did not return due to her work on Glee.

Even in Glee's early days, Lynch continued to pursue other projects. Lynch hosted Saturday Night Live on October 9, 2010; the news of her hosting was accidentally broken to her by her Glee boss, Ryan Murphy, by text message. Lynch had also guest-starred on the Nickelodeon comedy iCarly as Pam Puckett, Sam Puckett's mother, in the episode "iSam's Mom."

Lynch also voiced the titular supervillain Miss Power from the PBS Kids series WordGirl in the show's only movie The Rise of Miss Power in 2012.

Beginning on July 11, 2013, Lynch hosted the NBC game show Hollywood Game Night. The show had two teams made up of members of the public (civilians) and celebrities competing in various party games, with a chance for the civilians to take home up to $25,000.

Lynch was the co-host of the NBC special New Year's Eve with Carson Daly on December 31, 2013, alongside Carson Daly, host of The Voice.

In 2015, Lynch guest-starred in the television series Girl Meets World in the episode "Girl Meets Farkle's Choice".

On February 21, 2017, Lynch appeared on The Price Is Right as a Celebrity Charity Week contestant.

In March 2013, Lynch was announced as executive producer of comedy web series Dropping the Soap. Lynch starred in the series and was nominated for the Primetime Emmy Award for Outstanding Actress in a Short Form Comedy or Drama Series. The series premiered on Dekkoo and was made available on digital platforms including Amazon Video.

In 2017, Lynch portrayed Janet Reno for the Discovery Channel television series, Manhunt: Unabomber.

Also in 2017, Lynch guest-starred in Episode 7 of Marvelous Mrs Maisel as popular but dislikeable comic Sophie Lennon. Lynch returned in the role for two episodes at the end of the second season.

In 2019, Lynch joined the main cast of Final Space as A.V.A., the A.I. of the Crimson Light. Also that year, she voiced the character Patty, Mr. Ratburn's sister in the PBS Kids series Arthur in the episode Mr. Ratburn and the Special Someone.

In May 2020, it was reported that Lynch would appear in a recurring role on the Netflix comedy series Space Force.

On July 8, 2020, it was reported by Vulture that Lynch would host a revival of Weakest Link on NBC. The show debuted on September 29, 2020.

In November 2021, Lynch voiced Ole Golley in the Apple TV+ animated series Harriet the Spy.

Lynch has played recurring character Sazz in the Hulu/Disney+ comedy mystery series Only Murders in the Building since its beginning in 2021.

=== Other work ===
Lynch wrote and starred in the award-winning play Oh Sister, My Sister. Originally produced in 1998, the play kicked off the Lesbians in Theater program at the Los Angeles Gay and Lesbian Center in 2004.

She starred in Comcast's XFinity ads, mainly with two different laptops and two different colored Persian cats. She also stars in LG Corp.'s Text Ed campaign to educate drivers about the dangers of texting while driving.

Lynch's first experience hosting an awards show was in 2010 when she hosted the 2010 VH1 DoSomething Awards. It was announced that she will be hosting the 2011 VH1 DoSomething Awards, airing on VH1 on August 18. Lynch hosted the 63rd Primetime Emmy Awards on September 18, 2011, only the third woman in Emmy history to host the awards show solo.

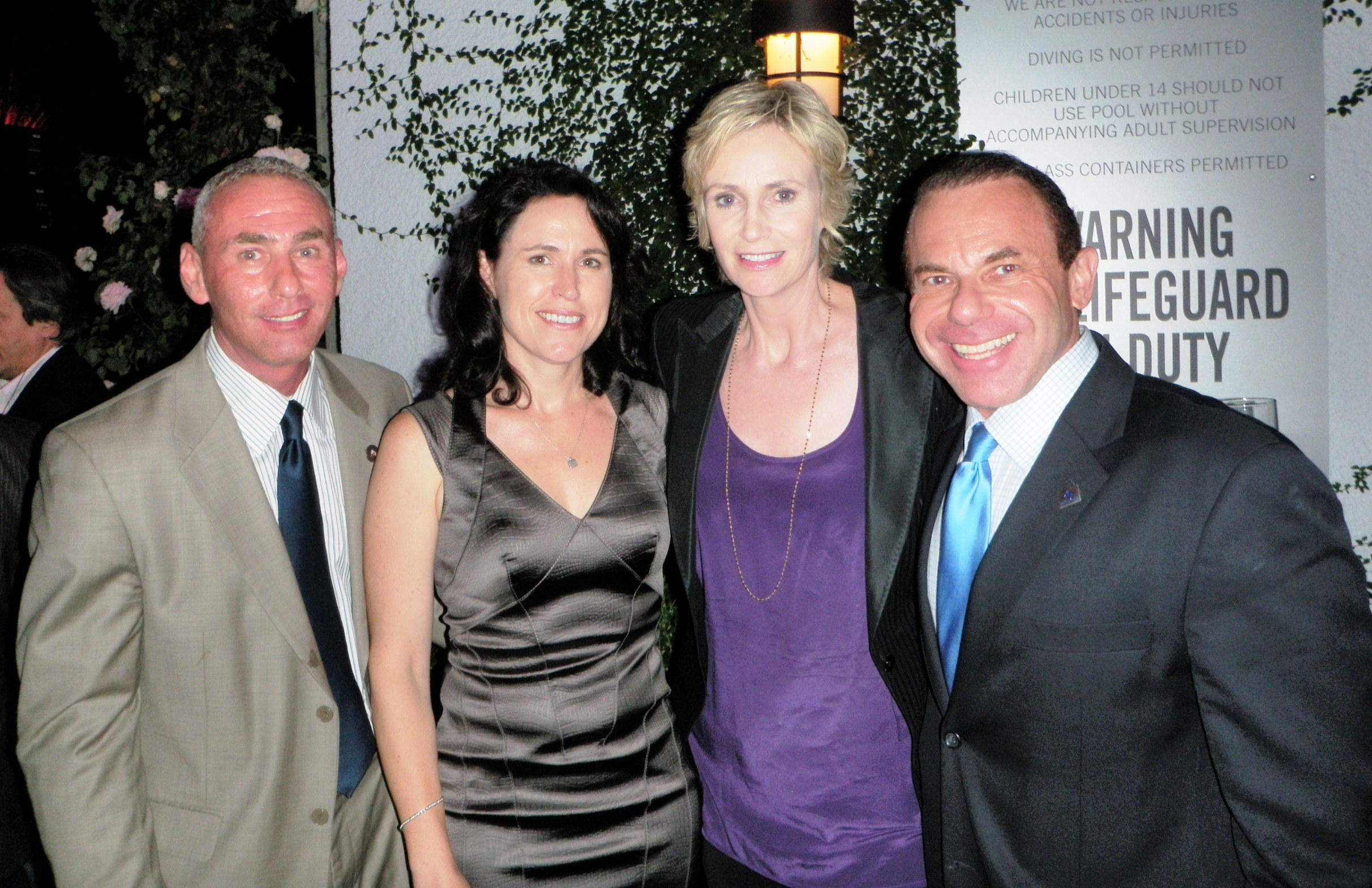
(l-r) Don Norte, Dr. Lara Embry, Jane Lynch, and Norte's husband, gay activist Kevin Norte, at Autum P-FLAG 2010's Charitable Event at The London Hotel, West Hollywood

An autobiography written by Lynch, titled Happy Accidents, was published in the fall of 2011 by Hyperion Voice. Lynch was inspired to write the book after reflecting upon the successes of her past year and wishing she could have told her more anxious, younger self to not worry as much. The memoir also includes detail about her years as an alcoholic and her success in battling this addiction. Lynch is openly lesbian and married Lara Embry in 2010. A self-proclaimed animal lover, Lynch has four rescue dogs. She has recorded a PSA for PETA encouraging the adoption of shelter animals, and she sponsors an annual adoption event at the Rose Bowl in Pasadena. She was the commencement speaker for Smith College's class of 2012 where she received an honorary Doctorate in Fine Arts.

In March 2012, Lynch was featured with Martin Sheen, Jamie Lee Curtis, Chris Colfer and Brad Pitt in a performance of Dustin Lance Black's play 8 – a staged re-enactment of the federal trial that overturned California's Prop 8 ban on same-sex marriage – as Maggie Gallagher. The production was held at the Wilshire Ebell Theatre and broadcast on YouTube to raise money for the American Foundation for Equal Rights.

Lynch made her Broadway debut as Miss Hannigan in Annie for a limited engagement lasting from May 15 to July 14, 2013. She took the place of Katie Finneran.

In 2014, Lynch joined the Ban Bossy campaign as a spokesperson advocating leadership roles for girls.

In 2015, Lynch debuted See Jane Sing, a cabaret show in which she sings along with Kate Flannery from The Office and Tim Davis from ABC's Boy Band, accompanied by the Tony Guerrero Quintet. As of 2019, the show continued to tour around the country. In 2016, Lynch released A Swingin' Little Christmas, a nostalgic Christmas album featuring the See Jane Sing ensemble and released on Lynch's own KitschTone Records label. The album received substantial airplay around the country and landed on the Billboard AC Chart's Top 10. In 2017, Lynch recorded a Christmas single with actor Dick Van Dyke. The song was composed and produced by Tony Guerrero and was released by KitschTone Records.

In 2020, Lynch directed her first two TV commercials for the production company STORY, and joined its roster of commercial directors.

In October 2021, she was cast in the Broadway revival of Funny Girl as Rosie Brice. Her stint ran from opening on April 24, 2022, to an expected August 14, 2022, conclusion.

In 2022, Lynch was named honorary "mayor of Funner", the putative location of Harrah's Resort Southern California. In this role, Lynch promotes the resort, including its additional vegan food options and non-alcoholic beverages as Lynch does not eat animal products nor drink alcohol.

== Personal life ==
Lynch married Lara Embry on May 31, 2010, in Sunderland, Massachusetts. They divorced in January 2014.

In November 2021, Lynch married partner Jennifer Cheyne in Santa Barbara, California.

Lynch is deaf in her right ear.

== Acting credits and accolades ==
For playing Sue Sylvester in Glee, she won a Primetime Emmy Award, Golden Globe Award, Screen Actors Guild Award, TCA Award, Satellite Award, and People's Choice Award. Lynch has received five Primetime Emmy Awards from twelve nominations, two Screen Actors Guild Awards from six nominations, and a Golden Globe Award from two nominations. In 2013, she was honored with a star on the Hollywood Walk of Fame.

Media offices
Preceded by George Gray	Host of the American game Weakest Link; 2020–present	Incumbent
