= Joe Marinelli =

American actor (1957–2025)

- Born: Joseph Anthony Marinelli; January 21, 1957; Meriden, Connecticut, U.S.
- Died: June 22, 2025 (aged 68); Burbank, California, U.S.
- Occupation: Actor
- Years active: 1984–2023

Joseph Anthony Marinelli (January 21, 1957 – June 22, 2025) was an American actor.

== Life and career ==
Marinelli had guest-starring roles on various syndicated night-time series, including NYPD Blue, Lethal Weapon, Agents of S.H.I.E.L.D., Desperate Housewives, Numb3rs, and Victorious. He also appeared in commercials and documentaries.

Marinelli was filming The Morning Show for Apple TV, where he played the role of Director Donny Spagnoli. He lived in Los Angeles with his wife, French hornist Jean Marinelli, and sons Vincent, a film editor and David, a music producer.

Marinelli died of stomach cancer in Burbank, California on June 22, 2025, at the age of 68.

== Filmography ==
Year	Title	Role	Director	Notes
1984	Cagney & Lacey	Crime Scene Officer	James Frawley	TV series (1 episode)
1985	Carmen	Joey	Alexander Payne	Short
1985	Hill Street Blues	Mortuary Guy	Christian I. Nyby II	TV series (1 episode)
1986	Stingray	Guard #1	David Hemmings	TV series (1 episode)
1987	L.A. Law	Gordon Bass	Sharron Miller	TV series (1 episode)
1988–1990	Santa Barbara	Bunny Tagliatti	Rick Bennewitz, Rob Schiller, ...	TV series (170 episodes); Soap Opera Digest Award for Outstanding Comic Actor: Daytime (1990)
1991	The Passion of Martin	Father	Alexander Payne	
1991	DEA	Anthony Maracotta Jr.	Peter Ellis	TV series (1 episode)
1991	Hunter	Mickey Dolan	Tony Mordente	TV series (1 episode)
1991	Equal Justice	D'Alessio	Barbara Amato	TV series (1 episode)
1991	Midnight Caller	Tony D'Arco	James Quinn	TV series (1 episode)
1991	They Came from Outer Space	Dino Manze	Gary Walkow	TV series (1 episode)
1992	Mann & Machine	Mr. Cromwell	Armand Mastroianni	TV series (1 episode)
1992	Bill & Ted's Excellent Adventures	Giacomo Casanova	Kristoffer Tabori	TV series (1 episode)
1993	Guiding Light	Pauly	Roy B. Steinberg	TV series (1 episode)
1995	Donor Unknown	Paolo	John Harrison	TV movie
1995	Models Inc.	Stan Driscoll	Linda Day	TV series (1 episode)
1997	ER	Joey	Sarah Pia Anderson	TV series (1 episode)
1997	NYPD Blue	Danny DeMarco	Michael W. Watkins	TV series (1 episode)
1999–2001	General Hospital	Joseph Sorel	William Ludel	TV series (14 episodes)
1999	The King of Queens	Neal	Rob Schiller	TV series (1 episode)
2000	JAG	Messers	Tony Wharmby	TV series (1 episode)
2002	NYPD Blue	Gene Greaves	Matthew Penn	TV series (1 episode)
2002	The District	Cutter's Attorney	Jim Charleston	TV series (1 episode)
2002	The West Wing	Morris	Vincent Misiano	TV series (1 episode)
2004	Sideways	Frass Canyon Pourer	Alexander Payne	
2004	One Last Ride	Carmine	Tony Vitale	
2004	The Assassination of Richard Nixon	Mel Samuels	Niels Mueller	
2004	The Practice	Rocco	Jeannot Szwarc & Bill D'Elia	TV series (2 episodes)
2005	Skylab	Fred Masters	Mark Landsman	Short
2006	Cutting Room	Vincent	Ian Truitner	
2006	Love Made Easy	Benito	Peter Luisi	
2007	Numbers	Phillip Berelli	John Behring	TV series (1 episode)
2008	House	Director	David Straiton	TV series (1 episode)
2009	Castle	Jimmy Moran	Bryan Spicer	TV series (1 episode)
2010	Parenthood	Professor Romano	Lawrence Trilling	TV series (1 episode)
2011	Victorious	Chancellor's Minion	Steve Hoefer	TV series (1 episode)
2011	Desperate Housewives	Father	David Warren	TV series (1 episode)
2013	Ray Donovan	Amelio	Jeremy Podeswa	TV series (1 episode)
2014	Legends	Professor	Terrence O'Hara	TV series (1 episode)
2014	Agents of S.H.I.E.L.D.	Adamo Dioli	Ron Underwood	TV series (1 episode)
2015	Switched at Birth	Motorist	Ron Lagomarsino	TV series (1 episode)
2016	Insecure	Jeweler	Debbie Allen	TV series (1 episode)
2018	Disjointed	Salvatore Scarlotti	Richie Keen	TV series (1 episode)
2018	Lethal Weapon	Stan	Clayne Crawford	TV series (1 episode)
2019	Giuseppe's Opus	Giuseppe	Trevor Downs	Short
2019–2023	The Morning Show	Donny Spagnoli	Mimi Leder, David Frankel, ...	TV series (22 episodes)
2020	Hollywood	Sidney Franklin	Ryan Murphy	TV series (1 episode)
