= List of Jane Lynch performances =

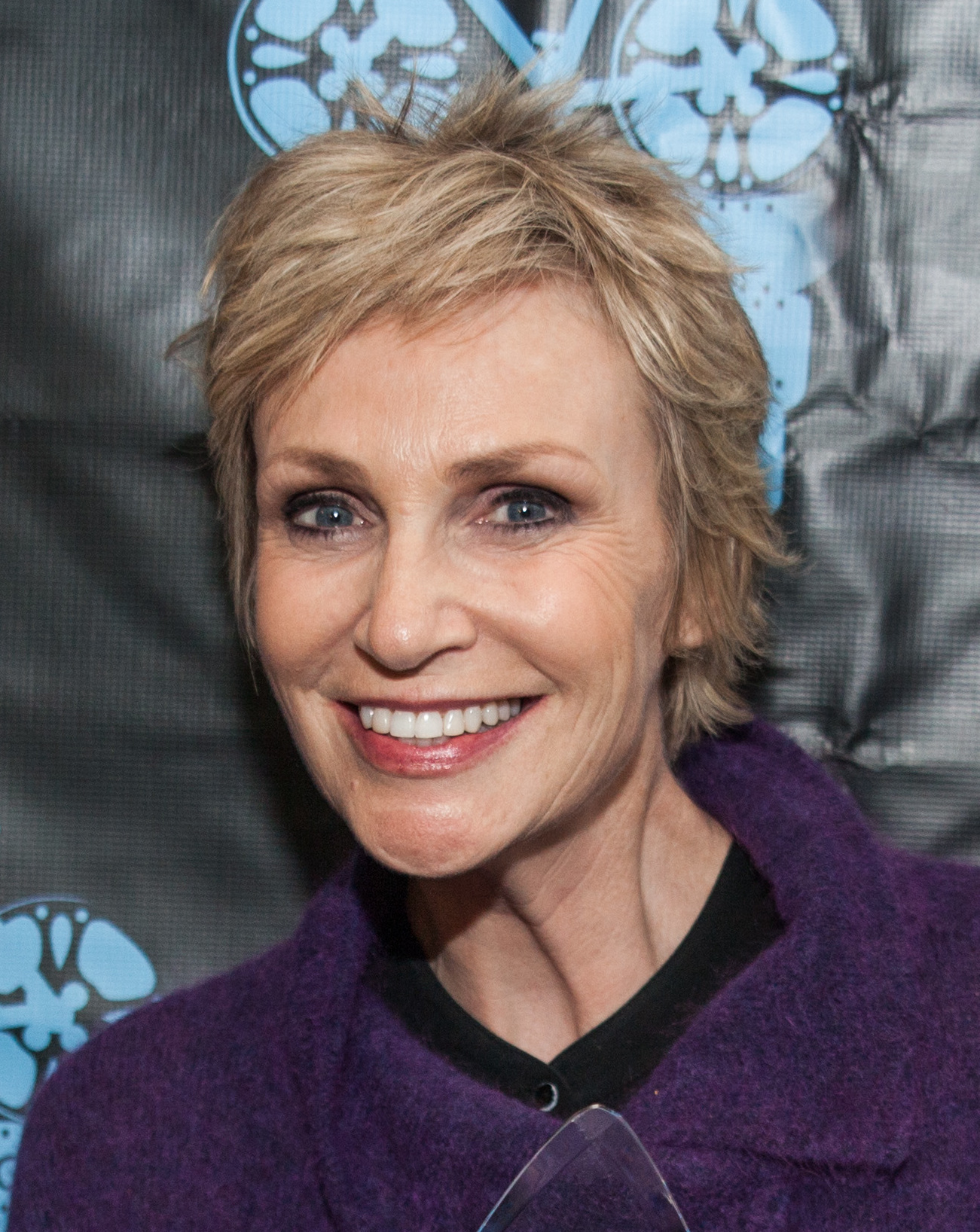
Lynch at the 2016 Willfilm Awards.

The following is a list of works by American actress, author, and comedian Jane Lynch.

== Filmography ==
=== Film ===
| Year | Title | Role | Notes |
|---|---|---|---|
| 1988 | Taxi Killer | Unknown | |
| 1988 | Vice Versa | Ms. Linstrom | |
| 1992 | Straight Talk | Gladys (voice) | |
| 1993 | The Fugitive | Dr. Kathy Wahlund | |
| 1993 | Fatal Instinct | Prison Reporter | |
| 1997 | Touch Me | Counselor | |
| 2000 | What Planet Are You From? | Doreen | |
| 2000 | Red Lipstick | Final TV Newscaster | |
| 2000 | Color Me Gay | Executive, Do-Rag Lesbian | Short film |
| 2000 | Best in Show | Christy Cummings | |
| 2001 | Martini | Dr. Jane | Short film |
| 2001 | Nice Guys Finish Last | Mom | Short film |
| 2002 | Hiding in Walls | Diane Moffet | Short film |
| 2002 | Collateral Damage | Agent Russo | |
| 2003 | A Mighty Wind | Laurie Bohner | |
| 2003 | Exposed | Julie Gross | |
| 2004 | Little Black Boot | Grace | Short film |
| 2004 | Surviving Eden | Maude Silver | |
| 2004 | Sleepover | Gabby Corky | |
| 2004 | Memoirs of an Evil Stepmother | Blanche Monroe | Short film |
| 2004 | Lemony Snicket's A Series of Unfortunate Events | Realtor | Uncredited |
| 2004 | The Aviator | Amelia Earhart | Scenes deleted |
| 2005 | Holly Hobbie and Friends: Surprise Party | Joan Hobbie, Minnie (voice) | |
| 2005 | Promtroversy | Mimi Nimby (Concerned Parent) | Short film |
| 2005 | The 40-Year-Old Virgin | Paula | |
| 2005 | Bam Bam and Celeste | Darlene | |
| 2005 | The Californians | Sybill Platt | |
| 2006 | Fifty Pills | Doreen | |
| 2006 | Talladega Nights: The Ballad of Ricky Bobby | Lucy Bobby | |
| 2006 | For Your Consideration | Cindy | |
| 2006 | The Frank Anderson | Dr. Emily Brice | Short film |
| 2006 | Holly Hobbie and Friends: Christmas Wishes | Joan Hobbie, Minnie (voice) | |
| 2006 | Eye of the Dolphin | Glinton | |
| 2007 | I Do & I Don't | Nora Stelmack | |
| 2007 | Smiley Face | Casting Director | |
| 2007 | Suffering Man's Charity | Ingrid | |
| 2007 | Love Is Love | Reverend Greeley | Short film |
| 2007 | Holly Hobbie and Friends: Best Friends Forever | Joan Hobbie, Minnie (voice) | |
| 2007 | Alvin and the Chipmunks | Gail | |
| 2007 | The Hammer | Woman in Hardware Store | |
| 2007 | The List | Dr. Davina | |
| 2007 | Walk Hard: The Dewey Cox Story | Gail the Television Reporter | |
| 2008 | The Toe Tactic | Honey Strumpet | |
| 2008 | Adventures of Power | Joni | |
| 2008 | Tru Loved | Ms. Maple | |
| 2008 | Space Chimps | Dr. Poole (voice) | |
| 2008 | The Rocker | Lisa Gadman | |
| 2008 | Another Cinderella Story | Dominique Blatt | |
| 2008 | Role Models | Gayle Sweeney | |
| 2008 | Man Maid | Sabena | |
| 2008 | Alex's Halloween | Mother | Short film |
| 2009 | Big Breaks | M.J. | Short film |
| 2009 | Spring Breakdown | Senator Kay Bee Hartmann | |
| 2009 | Weather Girl | J.D. | |
| 2009 | Ice Age: Dawn of the Dinosaurs | Diatryma Mom (voice) | |
| 2009 | Julie & Julia | Dorothy Dean Cousins, McWilliams | |
| 2009 | Post Grad | Carmella Malby | |
| 2010 | Birds of Paradise | Rosie (voice) | |
| 2010 | Shrek Forever After | Gretched (voice) | |
| 2010 | Space Chimps 2: Zartog Strikes Back | Dr. Poole (voice) | |
| 2010 | Pretty Parts | | Short film |
| 2011 | Mitzvah Communion | Elanie French | |
| 2011 | Rio | Alice (voice) | |
| 2011 | Paul | Pat Stevens | |
| 2011 | Carpool | | Short film |
| 2011 | Toy Story Toons: Small Fry | Neptuna (voice) | |
| 2011 | Sunshine Barry & The Disco Worms | Gloria (English version, voice) | |
| 2012 | The Three Stooges | Mother Superior | |
| 2012 | Delhi Safari | Female Flamingo (English version, voice) | |
| 2012 | Wreck-It Ralph | Sergeant Tamora Jean Calhoun (voice) | |
| 2012 | Dino Time | Sue Fitzpatrick (voice) | |
| 2012 | Abominable Christmas | Margaret Knowhow (voice) | |
| 2013 | Jungle Master | Ilene (English version, voice) | |
| 2013 | Afternoon Delight | Dr. Lenore | |
| 2013 | A.C.O.D. | Dr. Judith | |
| 2013 | Escape from Planet Earth | Io (voice) | |
| 2016 | Back to the Jurassic | Sue (voice) | |
| 2016 | After the Reality | Doctor | |
| 2016 | Nick and Snip | Katherine Pinpowzky (voice) | |
| 2016 | Mascots | Gabby Monkhouse | |
| 2016 | Writer's Block | Jane | Short film |
| 2016 | The Late Bloomer | Caroline Chambers | |
| 2017 | A Stork's Journey | Olga (voice) | |
| 2018 | The Birds Sing Too Loud | Clarice | Short film |
| 2018 | A Play | Betty | Short film |
| 2018 | Ralph Breaks the Internet | Sergeant Tamora Jean Calhoun (voice) | |
| 2019 | UglyDolls | Scanner, Electronic Voice (voice) | |
| 2020 | 100% Wolf | The Commander (voice) | |
| 2023 | The Venture Bros.: Radiant Is the Blood of the Baboon Heart | Bobbi St. Simone (voice) | |

=== Television ===
| Year | Title | Role | Notes |
|---|---|---|---|
| 1992 | In the Best Interest of the Children | Gwen Hatcher | Television film; as Jany Lynch |
| 1993 | Bakersfield P.D. | Michelle Hathaway | Episode: "Bakersfield Madam" |
| 1993 | Empty Nest | Tammy | Episode: "The Girl Who Cried Baby" |
| 1994 | Married... with Children | Greta | Episode: "Valentine's Day Massacre" |
| 1994 | Party of Five | Dr. Pennant | Episode: "Much Ado" |
| 1994 | The John Larroquette Show | Evaluator | Episode: "The Tutor" |
| 1995 | In The House | Ruth | Episode: "Female Trouble" |
| 1995 | NewsRadio | Carol | Episode: "The Cane" |
| 1996 | Cybill | Mrs. Sweeney | Episode: "Educating Zoey" |
| 1996 | 3rd Rock from the Sun | Mrs. Koppel | Episode: "Dick, Smoker" |
| 1996 | Frasier | Cynthia | Episode: "A Lilith Thanksgiving" |
| 1996–1998 | Caroline in the City | Hostess | 2 episodes |
| 1999 | Dharma & Greg | Sheryl | Episode: "Play Lady Play" |
| 1999–2000 | Judging Amy | ASA Perkins | 3 episodes |
| 2000 | JAG | Sandy's Friend | Episode: "The Witches of Gulfport" |
| 2000 | Gilmore Girls | Nurse | Episode: "Forgiveness and Stuff" |
| 2000–2001 | The West Wing | Reporter | 2 episodes |
| 2001 | Dawson's Creek | Mrs. Witter | Episode: "The Te of Pacey" |
| 2001 | Cursed | Carla | Episode: "...And Then Jack Had Two Dates" |
| 2001 | Popular | Susie Klein | Episode: "I Know What You Did Last Spring Break" |
| 2001 | The Division | Unknown | Episode: "The First Hit's Free, Baby" |
| 2001 | Arli$$ | Penny Bullock | Episode: "Giving Something Back" |
| 2001 | Boston Public | Jane Morrell | Episode: "Chapter Twenty-Four" |
| 2001 | Family Law | Cheryl Bowman | Episode: "No Options" |
| 2001 | The X-Files | Mrs. Anne T. Lokensgard | Episode: "Lord of the Flies" |
| 2001 | The King of Queens | Dr. Foreman | Episode: "Ovary Action" |
| 2001 | Family Guy | Dotty Campbell, Patsy Ramsey (voice) | 3 episodes |
| 2001 | 7th Heaven | Nurse | 4 episodes |
| 2002 | Titus | Prosecutor | Episode: "The Trial" |
| 2002 | Felicity | Professor Carnes | 2 episodes |
| 2002 | MDs | Aileen Poole, RN, PhD | Main role; 10 episodes |
| 2002 | The Big Time | Miss Rush | Television film |
| 2003 | Watching Ellie | Roman | Episode: "TV" |
| 2003 | The Dead Zone | Flo McMurtry | Episode: "The Storm" |
| 2003 | Spider-Man: The New Animated Series | Oscorp Executive (voice) | Episode: "Heroes and Villains" |
| 2003 | According to Jim | Janice | Episode: "The Lemonade Stand" |
| 2004 | NYPD Blue | Susanna Howe | Episode: "You Da Bomb" |
| 2004 | Monk | Dr. Julie Waterford | Episode: "Mr. Monk Gets Married" |
| 2004 | Las Vegas | Helen Putasca | Episode: "You Can't Take It With You" |
| 2004 | Arrested Development | Cindi Lightballoon | 3 episodes |
| 2004 | Friends | Ellen | Episode: "The One Where Estelle Dies" |
| 2004 | Veronica Mars | Mrs. Donaldson | Episode: "Return of the Kane" |
| 2004–2014 | Two and a Half Men | Dr. Linda Freeman | 14 episodes |
| 2004–2005 | Father of the Pride | Lily, Gift Store Clerk (voice) | 2 episodes |
| 2005 | Unscripted | Jane | 2 episodes |
| 2005 | CSI: Crime Scene Investigation | Ranger | Episode: "Unbearable" |
| 2005 | Blind Justice | Dr. Taylor | 2 episodes |
| 2005 | The Life and Times of Juniper Lee | Madame Rothschild (voice) | Episode: "Magic Takes a Holiday" |
| 2005 | Weeds | The Candyman | Episode: "Fashion of the Christ" |
| 2005 | Illeanarama | Ann | Unsold pilot |
| 2005–2006 | Rodney | Amy O'Brien | 2 episodes |
| 2005–2009 | The L Word | Joyce Wischnia | 15 episodes |
| 2006 | Desperate Housewives | Maxine Bennett | Episode: "Silly People" |
| 2006 | Night Stalker | Scientist | Episode: "Into Night"; Uncredited |
| 2006 | Lovespring International | Victoria Ratchford | Main role; 13 episodes |
| 2006 | Help Me Help You | Raquel Janes | 5 episodes |
| 2006 | Separated at Worth | Jennifer | Television film |
| 2006–2020 | Criminal Minds | Diana Reid | 10 episodes |
| 2006–2008 | Boston Legal | Joanna Monroe | 4 episodes |
| 2006–2012 | Handy Manny | Jackie Greenway (voice) | 5 episodes |
| 2007 | Campus Ladies | Professor | Episode: "Psych 101" |
| 2007 | The New Adventures of Old Christine | Ms. Hammond | 2 episodes |
| 2007–2023 | American Dad! | Various voices | 7 episodes |
| 2008 | My Name Is Earl | Sissy | Episode: "I Won't Die With a Little Help From My Friends" |
| 2008 | Out & Proud in Chicago | Narrator | Television film |
| 2008 | Psych | Barbara Dunlap | Episode: "There Might Be Blood" |
| 2009 | The Spectacular Spider-Man | Joan Jameson (voice) | Episode: "Gangland" |
| 2009 | Mr. Troop Mom | Ms. Hulka | Television film |
| 2009 | Reno 911! | Counselor | Episode: "Wiegel's Couple's Therapy" |
| 2009–2010, 2023 | Party Down | Constance Carmell | Main role |
| 2009–2015 | Glee | Sue Sylvester | Main role |
| 2010–2011 | The Cleveland Show | Ms. Eck, Sue Sylvester | 2 episodes |
| 2010 | Neighbors from Hell | Alex | Episode: "Screw the EPA" |
| 2010 | iCarly | Pam Puckett | Episode: "iSam’s Mom" |
| 2010 | VH1 Do Something Awards | Herself / Host | Television special |
| 2010 | Saturday Night Live | Herself / Host | Episode: "Jane Lynch/Bruno Mars" |
| 2010 | The Super Hero Squad Show | Nebula (voice) | 2 episodes |
| 2011–2013 | Phineas and Ferb | Mrs. Johnson (voice) | 5 episodes |
| 2011 | Web Therapy | Claire Dudek | Episode: "Public Relations" |
| 2011 | 63rd Primetime Emmy Awards | Herself / Host | Television special |
| 2011, 2018 | The Simpsons | Roz Davis, Jeanie (voice) | 2 episodes |
| 2012 | WordGirl | Miss Power (voice) | Episode: "The Rise of Miss Power" |
| 2012 | Comedy Central Roast of Roseanne | Herself / Host | Television special |
| 2012–2013 | The High Fructose Adventures of Annoying Orange | Jane the Peanut, Cobb (voice) | 2 episodes |
| 2013 | MasterChef | Herself | Episode: "Top 14 Compete" |
| 2013 | New Year's Eve with Carson Daly | Herself / Host | Television special |
| 2013–2020 | Hollywood Game Night | Herself / Host | Host |
| 2015 | Girl Meets World | Herself | Episode: "Girl Meets Farkle's Choice" |
| 2015 | Portlandia | Barbecue Planner | Episode: "4th of July" |
| 2016 | The Mr. Peabody & Sherman Show | Bernadette Steele (voice) | Episode: "Show on the Road" |
| 2016 | Angel from Hell | Amy | Main role |
| 2016 | Tween Fest | Sophia Sharp | 3 episodes |
| 2016 | The Real O'Neals | Herself | Episode: "The Real Thang"; Uncredited |
| 2016–2019 | The Stinky & Dirty Show | Dumper (voice) | Recurring role |
| 2017 | Dropping the Soap | Olivia Vanderstein | Recurring role |
| 2017 | NatGeo Wild's Earth Live | Herself / Host | Television special |
| 2017 | The Adventures of Puss in Boots | Sally (voice) | Episode: "Before They Hatch" |
| 2017 | Manhunt: Unabomber | Janet Reno | 3 episodes |
| 2017 | Will & Grace | Roberta | Episode: "Grandpa Jack" |
| 2017 | Goldie & Bear | Mrs. Locks (voice) | 3 episodes |
| 2017–2023 | The Marvelous Mrs. Maisel | Sophie Lennon | Main role |
| 2017–2021 | The Good Fight | Madeline Starkey | 5 episodes |
| 2018 | We Bare Bears | Susan Tankitha "Tank" Jackson (voice) | Episode: "Mom App" |
| 2018 | Dallas & Robo | Carol (voice) | 4 episodes |
| 2019 | Ryan Hansen Solves Crimes on Television | Herself | Episode: "For Your Inconsideration" |
| 2019 | The Loud House | Coach Hutch (voice) | Episode: "Driving Ambition" |
| 2019 | Tuca & Bertie | Coach Meredith (voice) | Episode: "The Jelly Lakes" |
| 2019 | Arthur | Patty Ratburn (voice) | Episode: "Mr. Ratburn and the Special Someone" |
| 2019 | Summer Camp Island | Skadi's Mom (voice) | Episode: "Mom Soon" |
| 2019 | Middle School Moguls | Mogul Victoria (voice) | 4 episodes |
| 2019–2020 | Big Hero 6: The Series | Supersonic Sue (voice) | 5 episodes |
| 2019–2021 | Final Space | A.V.A. (voice) | Main role |
| 2020 | Archibald's Next Big Thing | Sorry Culpepper (voice) | Episode: "The Four Flamingos/The Roaring Rooster" |
| 2020 | Bubble Guppies | Genie (voice) | Episode: "Genie in a Bubble!" |
| 2020 | Space Force | Chief of Naval Operations | 3 episodes |
| 2020 | Glitch Techs | Joan Fishback (voice) | 2 episodes |
| 2020 | Spirit Riding Free: Riding Academy | Coach Bradley (voice) | 2 episodes |
| 2020 | Sarah Cooper: Everything's Fine | KJ Dillard | Television special |
| 2020–present | Weakest Link | Herself / Host | |
| 2021 | Close Enough | Barb (voice) | Episode: "Joint Break/Cyber Matrix" |
| 2021 | Solar Opposites | Kabronius (voice) | Episode: "The Sacred Non-Repeating Number" |
| 2021 | Robot Chicken | Miss Grundy (voice) | Episode: "The Bleepin' Robot Chicken Archie Comics Special" |
| 2021 | Q-Force | Judy (voice) | Episode: "Greyscale" |
| 2021–2023 | Ridley Jones | Lonny (voice) | |
| 2021–2023 | The Ghost and Molly McGee | Mrs. Roop (voice) | |
| 2021–2023 | Harriet the Spy | Ole Golly (voice) | 16 episodes |
| 2021–2022 | The Chicken Squad | Dr. Dirt (voice) | 9 episodes |
| 2021–2025 | Only Murders in the Building | Sazz Pataki | Recurring role |
| 2022 | El Deafo | Mrs. Sinklemann (voice) | 2 episodes |
| 2022 | Oddballs | Grandma (voice) | Episode: "Grandma's Boy" |
| 2023 | The Proud Family: Louder and Prouder | Celia (voice) | 2 episodes |
| 2023 | Carol Burnett: 90 Years of Laughter + Love | Herself | Television special |
| 2023 | Digman! | Amelia Earhart (voice) | Episode: "The Mile High Club" |
| 2023 | Bob's Burgers | Carol (voice) | Episode: "Crab-solutely Fabulous" |
| 2023 | Krapopolis | Brenda the Sphinx (voice) | Episode: "12 Angry Goat Herders" |
| 2023 | Hamster & Gretel | Bayou Barb (voice) | Episode: "Bayou Barb" |
| 2023–2024 | Velma | Donna Blake (voice) | 10 episodes |
| 2024 | The Great North | Aunt Dirt (voice) | 4 episodes |
| 2025 | The Conners | Jean | 2 episodes |
| 2026 | Happy's Place | Valerie "Val" | Recurring seasons 2 & 3 |
| 2026 | Law & Order | Cordelia Travers | season 25 episode 16 "Fate's Cruel Joke" |

=== Video games ===
| Year | Title | Voice role | Ref. |
|---|---|---|---|
| 2009 | Leisure Suit Larry: Box Office Bust | Denise Lemon | |
| 2010 | Marvel Super Hero Squad: The Infinity Gauntlet | Nebula | |
| 2012 | Wreck-It Ralph | Sergeant Calhoun | |
| 2023 | Disney Speedstorm | Sergeant Calhoun | |

=== Theatre ===
| Year | Title | Role | Venue | Notes |
|---|---|---|---|---|
| 2009 | Love, Loss, and What I Wore | Performer | Westside Theatre | Off-Broadway |
| 2013 | Annie | Miss Hannigan | Palace Theatre | Broadway |
| 2022 | Funny Girl | Mrs. Brice | August Wilson Theatre | |

== Discography ==
=== Soundtracks ===
- 2003: A Mighty Wind
- 2008: Another Cinderella Story
- 2010: Glee: The Music, The Power of Madonna
- 2010: Glee: The Music, Volume 3 Showstoppers
- 2010: "Ohio [Glee Cast Version]" (Featuring Carol Burnett) – Single
- 2013: "I Still Believe / Super Bass [Glee Cast Version]" with Darren Criss – Single
- 2013: "Little Girls", "Easy Street" Bonus Track on Annie Broadway Revival Cast Recording

=== Albums ===
- 2016: A Swingin' Little Christmas
