= Kate Atkinson =

Kate Atkinson may refer to:

- Kate Atkinson (actress) (born 1972), Australian actress
- Kate Atkinson (writer) (born 1951), English writer
