= Bounty Killer (film) =

- Theatrical release poster
- Directed by: Henry Saine
- Screenplay by: Jason Dodson; Henry Saine; Colin Ebeling
- Story by: Jason Dodson
- Based on: The graphic novel by Jason Dodson; Henry Saine
- Produced by: Jason Netter; Colin Ebeling; Henry Saine
- Starring: Kristanna Loken; Christian Pitre; Matthew Marsden; Beverly D'Angelo; Eve Jeffers
- Cinematography: David Conley
- Edited by: Martin Bernfeld
- Music by: Greg Edmonson
- Production companies: Raindance Entertainment; Kickstart Productions; Just Chorizo Productions
- Distributed by: Arc Entertainment
- Release date: September 6, 2013
- Running time: 93 minutes
- Country: United States
- Language: English

Bounty Killer is a 2013 post-apocalyptic action comedy film Starting Kristanna Loken directed by Henry Saine. Bounty Killer is based on a graphic novel published by Kickstart Comics in 2013.

== Plot ==
In a post-apocalyptic wasteland known as the Thrice Burned Lands, celebrity bounty killers Drifter (Matthew Marsden) and Mary Death (Christian Pitre) hunt down corporate criminals responsible for the world’s collapse. After a Council-issued death warrant unexpectedly targets Drifter, he and an eager gun caddy named Jack LeMans (Barak Hardley) go on the run, pursued by yellow-tie mercenaries from the powerful corporation Second Sun. Mary, torn between duty and loyalty, also receives the warrant and sets out to confront Drifter.

Their journey leads them through a series of violent encounters with corrupt executives, Gypsies from Mary’s past, and agents of Second Sun. Along the way, Drifter reveals Mary was once a Gypsy named Nuri, whom he trained as a bounty killer before they fell in love. The trio ultimately discovers the Council of Nine has been slaughtered and Second Sun is behind a conspiracy to take control of what remains of civilization.

Captured and nearly forced back into corporate servitude by his former wife Catherine (Kristanna Loken), Drifter is rescued by Mary, Jack, and a newly allied Gypsy army. In a climactic battle at Second Sun headquarters, Mary is gravely wounded but survives thanks to her armor. After recovering, she leaves to continue the fight against corporate tyranny, while Drifter and Jack prepare for the next mission.

== Cast ==
- Kristanna Loken as Catherine
- Christian Pitre as Mary Death
- Matthew Marsden as Francis Gorman/Drifter
- Barak Hardley as Jack LeMans
- Abraham Benrubi as Jimbo
- Eve Jeffers as Mocha Sujata
- Beverly D'Angelo as Lucille
- Kevin McNally as Daft Willy
- Mindy Robinson as Estelle
- Will Collyer as Billy Boom
- Gary Busey as Van Sterling
- Jeff Meacham as Greg Gunney
- Soon Hee Newbold as Vio Lin

== Production ==
The idea was first explored as a cartoon, which was subsequently adapted into both a graphic novel and short film. Saine's original works were closer in tone to The Road Warrior and were modeled after the Enron scandal. After the 2008 financial crisis, Saine realized that a feature-length adaptation would be even more timely. The feature film's tone was influenced by Ice Pirates, Six String Samurai, and Death Race 2000. Although explicit themes of retrofuturism were eventually dropped, as these were believed to be too confusing for audiences to understand, the film's setting still makes use of the aesthetic; for example, the cars are all from the 1970s, and much of the technology is analog. Shooting took 18 days. Although the crew were fond of practical effects, they did not have the opportunity to make extensive use of them due to the fast production schedule. Many of the cars used in the film were either donated or made available at low cost.

== Soundtrack ==
The theme song "Gonna Getcha" was performed by Sara Bareilles. Bareilles also sang "The Kill" for the film's end credits. Both songs were written by Will Collyer. Lyrics for "The Kill" were written by Sujata Day.

== Release ==
Bounty Killer had its world premiere at the Dallas International Film Festival in the US and played at Fantasia Film Festival in Canada. Bounty Killer was released on 6 September 2013 in theaters and on Video on Demand. The DVD and Blu-ray were released on 29 October 2013. Bounty Killer was released in the UK on DVD, Blu-ray, and VOD on 27 January 2014.

== Reception ==
Rotten Tomatoes, a review aggregator, reports that 58% of 26 surveyed critics gave the film a positive review; the average rating is 5.7/10. Metacritic rated it 46/100 based on nine reviews. Dennis Harvey of Variety wrote, "Cheerfully gory, derivative and silly, Bounty Killer aspires to nothing more or less than trashy fun for genre fans, and [...] delivers on that modest but admirable score." Frank Scheck of The Hollywood Reporter wrote, "It's all utterly silly and derivative but also undeniably entertaining." Film Journal International called it "sometimes clever and always action-packed". Miriam Bale of The New York Times wrote, "Watching this movie feels like viewing a very long, expensive car commercial and waiting for the real film to begin." Inkoo Kang of the Los Angeles Times wrote, "Flat jokes, uneven performances, and a predictable romance help make Bounty Killer a lot less fun than it should be — a killer shame, given its boldly gonzo premise." G. Allen Johnson of the San Francisco Chronicle rated it four out of five stars and called it "an agreeable time passer" where the stars appear to be having a fun time. Michael Nordine of The Village Voice wrote that while the film is not good, it is still entertaining. Nick Schager of The Dissolve rated it two out of five stars and wrote, "Bounty Killer proves a derivative science-fiction saga with even less flavor than the characters' rare favorite beverage, Pabst Blue Ribbon." Gabe Toro of Indiewire rated it C− and wrote, "It's a film that plays equally to both sides of the political spectrum, and it feels like pandering either way." Bill Graham of Twitch Film wrote, "With a silly brand of inventive and violent humor crossed with the freedom of the post-apocalyptic setting, Bounty Killer is a hell of a good time that never takes itself too seriously."
