= Cutting Room (film) =

- Directed by: Ian Truitner
- Written by: Ian Truitner
- Produced by: Jeffrey S. Magnussen; Felipe Pimiento
- Starring: Elizabeth Daily; Jon Polito; Weetus Cren; Richard T. Jones; Mark Elias
- Cinematography: Mateo Londono
- Edited by: Christopher S. Baird, Todd Szuch
- Music by: Kays Al-Atrakchi
- Production company: Thousand Mile Media
- Distributed by: Netflix, Anthem Pictures
- Release date: March 23, 2006 (Italy)
- Running time: 81 minutes
- Country: United States
- Language: English

Cutting Room is an American comedy horror film written and directed by Ian Truitner, and starring Elizabeth Daily, Jon Polito, Weetus Cren, Richard T. Jones and Mark Elias.

== Plot ==
Charles Drake, a maven in the realm of low-budget exploitation cinema, has enlisted the talents of the budding director Ed Smith for his latest venture, "Curse of the Killer." The film's concept stems from an incomplete script penned by Ed himself. Ed envisions this opportunity as his ticket to stardom, although his optimism remains a solitary island amidst a sea of skepticism from all other parties involved in this wandering project.

As the gears of production churn, a grim twist of fate takes center stage – individuals associated with the film find themselves meeting gruesome demises one after another. Charles, well-accustomed to navigating the murky waters of unsavory characters, begins to harbor suspicions. He posits that the enigmatic figure behind this mounting body count might be a mob boss who covertly finances the film. However, in a world where everyone surrounding him is equally enmeshed in dubious dealings, singling out the true malefactor becomes a daunting task.

Amidst the carnage, a haunting question looms: will there emerge anyone unscathed, with the ability to see the film through to completion?

== Cast ==
- Elizabeth Daily as Joanne Kramer
- Mark Elias as Ed Smith
- Weetus Cren as Charles Drake
- Richard T. Jones as Steve
- Jon Polito as Sandy
- Lindsey Labrum as Mindy
- Chopper Bernet as Detective Masters
- Dimitri Lekkos as Brock Steele
- Joe Marinelli as Vincent
- Garrison Koch as Nicky Dorfman
- Tony Keyes as Manuel Orosco III
- Kristy Jean Hulslander as Drew
- Tess Parker as Annie
- Paige Peterson as Vanessa
- Riley Weston as Sitcom Girl

== Release ==
The film premiered in 2006 at the Milan International Film Festival (MIFF) and was distributed by Anthem Pictures. It was one of the first films in the Netflix steaming library. The film was later released under the title "Wide Scream" in Australia and Amazon Prime in North America.
