= Teleios (film) =

- Directed by: Ian Truitner
- Written by: Ian Truitner
- Produced by: Jeffrey S. Magnussen; Hayley Helmreich; Matthew S. Gore
- Starring: Sunny Mabrey; Lance Broadway; Michael Nouri; T.J. Hoban; Mykel Shannon Jenkins; Christian Pitre; Ursula Mills; Weetus Cren
- Cinematography: Jasmin Kuhn
- Edited by: Gabriella Cristiani
- Music by: Roman Kovalik
- Production company: Thousand Mile Media
- Distributed by: Screen Media Films; Amazon Prime Video
- Release dates: May 1, 2016 (Sci-Fi-London); September 5, 2017
- Running time: 90 minutes
- Country: United States
- Language: English

Teleios, also known as Beyond the Trek, is a 2016 American science-fiction film written and directed by Ian Truitner. The film stars Sunny Mabrey, Lance Broadway, Michael Nouri, T.J. Hoban, Mykel Shannon Jenkins, Christian Pitre, Ursula Mills and Weetus Cren, and was edited by Gabriella Cristiani.

Teleios had its world premiere at Sci-Fi-London and U.S. premiere at Shriekfest. It has won 24 international film awards, including Best Science Fiction Feature at The New York Science Fiction Film Festival, Head of Jury Award at Fantastic Planet Film Festival, the Forry Ackerman Imagi-Movie Award at the Silver Screen Festival and Best Special FX at the Maverick Movie Awards.

== Plot ==
For the past two years, a mining vessel designed for deep space exploration has been adrift near Titan, one of Saturn's moons. The fate of the crew remains a mystery, as they may have met a tragic end at each other's hands. To uncover the truth, a rescue ship named "Teleios" is dispatched, carrying a crew of genetically enhanced people. Their mission: to search for survivors and unravel the events that transpired. However, little do they know that the secrets awaiting them have the potential to not only jeopardize their own existence, but also threaten the very fabric of humanity.

== Cast ==
- Sunny Mabrey as Iris Duncan
- Lance Broadway as Commander Linden
- Michael Nouri as Nordham
- T.J. Hoban as Chris Zimmer
- Mykel Shannon Jenkins as Doctor Orson
- Christian Pitre as Emma Anderson
- Ursula Mills as Lulu AH-320
- Weetus Cren as Travis O’Neill
- John Posey as Atromitos Captain
- Leila Birch as Computer Voice
- Armando DuBon Jr. as Crewman Ramirez
- Andreas Lyon as Crewman Vanderveld
- Phillip Tan as Crewman Dang

== Release ==
The film was renamed "Beyond the Trek" and distributed in North America through Screen Media Films and streaming on Amazon Prime Video. The release title of Teleios has changed in different countries. It's known as "Deep Space" in the U.K., "Teleios - Endlose Angst" in Germany, "Beyond the Trek" in Japan, and by its original title, "Teleios", in Australia.

== Response ==
The Austin Chronicle said, "Truitner's story of social strata, and the terrifying potential of gene tampering, has found a new timeliness." First Comics News gave it 4 out of 5 stars, saying "For the start, the show is low key. Things do really start getting interesting as the show takes some unexpected twists and turns." Film Threat gave the film a 6 out of 10, stating "Visually, the movie rocks. This is an indie effort worthy of note that fails to tick a few boxes, but still deserves perhaps a “B” for effort."
