= Ursula Mills =

Australian actress

- Born: Sydney
- Occupation: Actress
- Years active: 2003–present

Ursula Mills is an Australian actress.

== Education ==
Mills studied Shakespeare at the Royal Academy of Dramatic Art. She later auditioned for the Western Australian Academy of Performing Arts and graduated in 2006.

== Career ==
Mills played a mermaid in the 2003 feature film Peter Pan. It marked her first acting role and first audition since she left high school.

From 2009 to 2010, Mills was a member of the resident acting ensemble at Sydney Theatre Company, selected by then co-artistic directors, Cate Blanchett and Andrew Upton.

Mills was a brand ambassador for Skins from 2009 until 2012.

Mills received positive reviews in her lead role as Lian in Sue Smith's Kryptonite, a 2014 co-production between Sydney Theatre Company and State Theatre Company of South Australia.

In 2017, Mills toured Australia playing Julia in Headlong, Almeida Theatre and Nottingham Playhouse's production of Duncan MacMillan and Robert Icke's adaptation of George Orwell's 1984 for GWB Entertainment, Ambassador Theatre Group Asia Pacific and State Theatre Company of South Australia.

In 2022, Mills appeared in the Nine Network miniseries Underbelly: Vanishing Act.

== Filmography and theatre ==
Year	Title	Role	Notes
2003	Peter Pan	Mermaid	Director PJ Hogan
2013	Vessel	Hannah	Won – Best Science Fiction Feature NYC's The Philip K Dick Film Festival, 2013 Official Selection Made in Melbourne Film Festival, 2013 Official Selection Fantasia International Film Festival, 2013 Official Selection London Sci-Fi Film Festival
2014	Bunker	Ellen	Official Selection – Cineglobe Festival International de Filmsau Cern
2015	The Tail Job	Siobhan	Official Selection - Slamdance Film Festival 2016 Winner Grand Jury Prize CATE Film Festival 2016
2015	The California No	Allison	Best Narrative Feature 2018 Independent Film Festival
2016	Teleios	Lulu	2016 Official Selection Sci-Fi-London 2016 U.S Premiere Official Selection 16th Annual Shriekfest 2016 Australian Premier Official Selection Sydney Sci-Fi and Fantasy Film Festival
2021	Home and Away	Emma Pizzuti	
2022	Underbelly: Vanishing Act	Phoebe	

Theatre
Year	Production	Theatre	Role	Notes
2009	Accidental Death of an Anarchist	Sydney Theatre Company	Maria Feletti	
2009	The Mysteries Genesis	Sydney Theatre Company	by Lally Katz	
2010	Leviathan	Sydney Theatre Company		
2010	Comedy of Errors	Sydney Theatre Company	Angelo/Duke	
2010	Oresteia	Sydney Theatre Company	Choryphaeus	
2010	Vs. Macbeth	Sydney Theatre Company	Witch	2010 Official Selection Adelaide Festival
2014	Kryptonite	Sydney Theatre Company and State Theatre Company of South Australia	Lian	Nominated – 2014 Sydney Theatre Award for Best Actress in a Mainstage Production
2015	Elektra/Orestes	Belvoir St Theatre	Chrysothemis	
2016	Betrayal	Ensemble Theatre	Emma	
2017	John	Melbourne Theatre Company	Jenny	
2017	1984	GWB Entertainment, Ambassador Theatre Group Asia Pacific and State Theatre Company of South Australia	Julia	
2018	Anthony and Cleopatra	Bell Shakespeare	Octavia	
2023	Twelfth Night	Bell Shakespeare	Olivia	

== Awards and nominations ==
Mills was nominated for a 2014 Sydney Theatre Awards Best Actress in a Leading Role in a Mainstream Production for Kryptonite.
