= Fat Cow Motel =

Australian comedy/drama television series

- Genre: Comedy; Drama; Crime
- Created by: Tracey Robertson; Nathan Mayfield
- Written by: Graeme Koetsveld; Marissa Cooke; Annette Moore; Andrew Kelly
- Directed by: Robert Klenner; Daniel Nettheim; Nathan Mayfield
- Starring: Kate Atkinson; Brendan Cowell
- Composer: Cameron McKenzie
- Country of origin: Australia
- Original language: English
- No. of series: 1
- No. of episodes: 13

Production
- Producers: Tracey Robertson; Nathan Mayfield
- Cinematography: Robert Humphreys
- Running time: 25 minutes

Original release
- Network: ABC
- Release: 10 July – 2 October 2003

Fat Cow Motel is an Australian comedy/drama television series, created by Nathan Mayfield and Tracey Robertson and starring Kate Atkinson and Brendan Cowell. Described as an interactive drama viewers could register online for access to the shows website and to sms and email messages sent onscreen during the show Each episode ends in a mystery cliffhanger which can be solved with help from the interactive content. Two final episodes were filmed and the audience could vote for their desired alternative.

The show was filmed in Harrisville, Queensland with the town's Royal Hotel standing in for the titular Fat Cow Motel.

== Synopsis ==
The owner of the Fat Cow Motel makes up a story that a famous rock star died in one of the rooms in her motel which attracts a journalist to town.

== Cast ==
- Kate Atkinson as Cassie Brown
- Brendan Cowell as Jack Green
- Sally McKenzie as Eleanor Rigby
- Julie Forsyth as Penny Lane
- Roy Billing as Bill Butler
- Charlie Koranias as Ronnie McDonald
- Henrik Gangsater as Ian Johanssen
- Johan Gangsater as Martin Johanssen
- Steven Grives as Dennis Dreeble
- Carita Farrer Spencer as Wilma Morrow
- Iain Gardiner as Phil Morrow
- Eugene Gilfedder as Arthur Cassley
- Catherine Miller as Tracey Cassley
- Peta Brady as Diane
- Charlotte Gregg as Cathy / Rhonda
- Toby Schmitz as Toby Meares
- Gyton Grantley as Gary Walpole
- Robbie McGregor as Narrator

== Reception ==
Nicole Brady of The Age wrote: "It looks great on paper, but two weeks in and this Australian comedy-mystery series is feeling a little clunky." In the Illawarra Mercury, Glen Humphries noted: "The two lead actors in this weekly whodunit are both very watchable and there's a certain charm here. Shame it's hampered by the show's over-emphasis on interactivity."

Summing up the fate of Australian-made dramas, Greg Hassall of The Sydney Morning Herald wrote: "A comedy/drama set in a rural town, billed as our first interactive drama because viewers could follow clues on the show's website to solve a mystery each week. But the interactive angle felt gimmicky and the show lasted only one season."
