= Christian Pitre =

American actress

Christian Pitre (born October 13, 1983) is an American actress known for her roles in Bounty Killer and Crazy, Stupid, Love.

== Career ==
Pitre is best known for her leading role as Mary Death in the 2013 post-apocalyptic film Bounty Killer opposite Matthew Marsden and Kristanna Loken. The Hollywood Reporter remarked that Pitre "spectacularly fulfills her role’s physical and athletic demands", although dismissed the film as "utterly silly and derivative but also undeniably entertaining". She is also known for her role as Kristen in Shannon Christian's 2004 drama film Playing Clandestine, her screen debut, a role which she won after meeting an actor who knew the director in Nashville.

In 2011, she featured as a waitress in Glenn Ficarra and John Requa's romantic drama Crazy, Stupid, Love, opposite Steve Carell and Ryan Gosling. In 2009 she appeared in an episode of CSI: Miami, and in 2013 appeared as Claire in two episodes of the comedy series Adopted. In 2014 Pitre played the character of Victoria in an episode of True Blood.

In 2014, she was cast in the role of Emma Anderson in sci-fi film Teleios, which was released under the title Beyond the Trek in 2017.

== Filmography ==
=== Film ===
Year	Title	Role	Notes
2004	Playing Clandestine	Kristin	
2008	Boys of Summerville	Sandy	
2008	A Father's Rights	Nicole	
2009	Sparkle & Tooter	Sparkle	
2011	Crazy, Stupid, Love	Waitress with Check	
2013	Bounty Killer	Mary Death	
2016	Beyond the Trek	Emma Anderson	

=== Television ===
Year	Title	Role	Notes
2009	CSI: Miami	Lindsay Garland	Episode: "Presumed Guilty"
2013–2018	Adopted	Claire Stone	7 episodes
2014	True Blood	Victoria	Episode: "Death Is Not the End"
