= Melissa Caddick =

Australian financial advisor (unlicensed); disappeared 2020

- Born: Melissa Louise Grimley; 21 April 1971; Australia
- Disappeared: 12 November 2020 (aged 49); Dover Heights, New South Wales, Australia
- Status: Declared deceased
- Occupation: Financial advisor (unlicensed)
- Known for: Ponzi scheme, disappearance
- Spouses: Tony Caddick (m. 2000; div. 2013) Anthony Koletti (m. 2013)
- Children: 1
- Motive: Financial gain (alleged)

Melissa Louise Caddick (née Grimley; born 21 April 1971 – disappeared 12 November 2020, declared deceased 2023) was an Australian woman who disappeared in November 2020 amid an investigation by the Australian Securities & Investments Commission (ASIC) for carrying on a financial services business without holding an Australian Financial Services (AFS) licence. She vanished the day after ASIC agents and Australian Federal Police officers raided her home at Dover Heights, Sydney, on the suspicion that she had misappropriated approximately A$30 million from investors, including her friends and family, in an elaborate Ponzi scheme.

After months of speculation as to her whereabouts, partial human remains discovered on a New South Wales beach in February 2021 were confirmed to be Caddick's through DNA testing. In May 2023, the deputy state coroner declared Caddick deceased after a coronial inquest but was unable to determine how she died.

== Early life ==
Melissa Caddick was born Melissa Louise Grimley on 21 April 1971, and grew up in Lugarno, a southern suburb of Sydney.

After graduating from high school, Caddick enrolled in a secretarial and business administration course at Patrick's College Australia in Sydney. Her résumé reportedly included fictitious qualifications including degrees in finance from the University of Technology Sydney, which later said it had "no record of completion of a Graduate Diploma in Finance or Masters of Business in Finance – or indeed any qualification – under the name of Melissa Caddick or Melissa Grimley."

== Career ==
After initially working in NRMA's investment division, Caddick joined the Sydney branch of an unidentified boutique investment bank as an office administrator. In 1998, six months after taking the job, she was discovered to have stolen less than A$2,000 from the company by forging her boss's signature on several cheques. Rather than pursue prosecution, the company gave Caddick the option of leaving immediately without the police being summoned, or the matter being escalated; she chose to leave.

Shortly afterwards, Caddick was hired as a financial advisor for Wise Financial Services, a subsidiary of ING, and eventually purchased a 25% stake in the business after borrowing A$750,000. By 2003, she had become so well-regarded in her field that she was featured on a cover of the trade magazine Independent Financial Advisor. However, Caddick fell out with Wise when the company refused to allow her to recommend property and shares to her clients due to regulatory compliance rules.

In later years, Caddick's extravagant spending drew suspicion among her acquaintances. It has been alleged that when questioned about how she could financially support her lavish lifestyle, she concocted differing stories about a windfall payment she had received from Wise, either in the form of an A$86 million severance package or a similarly large payout from a sexual harassment claim. In reality, the only money she received in the separation from Wise was a return of her original A$750,000 investment, which required her to sign a five-year non-compete agreement.

== Personal life ==
Caddick's first husband, Tony Caddick, originally from England, worked as a builder's labourer in Sydney. They married in a ceremony at the Garrison Church in Millers Point, Sydney, on 20 April 2000. Their son was born in 2006, and was aged 14 at the time of Caddick's disappearance in 2020. Tony, who had studied political science in England, was encouraged by his wife to complete his law degree and he was admitted as a solicitor in April 2006.

In 2010, the family moved abroad to England, to live in Essex and be closer to Tony's family, while he commuted daily to his job in London. Caddick did not work while she lived in England and reportedly found herself bored with her situation. On the pretext of needing to "brush up" on her financial skills, she told her husband she was travelling to Switzerland to attend a conference. According to Tony, he later learned that Caddick had actually travelled to Paris to meet with Anthony Koletti, her Sydney hairdresser, where they were seen together and photographed by a mutual friend; Tony discovered that she had paid for Koletti's international travel expenses as part of an ongoing extramarital affair.

After being confronted with her deception, while Tony went to stay with his family, Caddick cleaned out their home in Essex, emptied their joint bank accounts, and left. She moved back to Sydney with their son in January 2012. Once back in Australia, she falsely claimed to family and friends that Tony had been a controlling and abusive spouse. The couple divorced in 2013, and Caddick married Koletti later that year.

== Ponzi scheme ==
Between October 2012 and November 2020, it is believed Caddick misappropriated A$30 million in funds from clients who were primarily family and friends. It is understood she deposited these funds into thirty-seven bank accounts. Caddick had allegedly spent investors' finances on two houses in Sydney's eastern suburbs as well as luxury cars, designer clothing, artwork and jewellery.

As clients invested money, Caddick fabricated CommSec portfolio statements and created fake account numbers to show her investors what return they had purportedly achieved, making them falsely believe they had invested in shares. Counsel for ASIC, Farid Assaf SC, said that "as befitting a successful businesswoman", Caddick used the proceeds of her crimes to acquire "all the trappings of wealth" and that her "success was all a façade and the financial services business was an elaborate front for Ms. Caddick's Ponzi scheme."

== Disappearance and death ==
Caddick vanished on 12 November 2020, the morning after ASIC agents and the Australian Federal Police raided her home in Dover Heights, Sydney. She was last heard from by her son, who detected a door shutting at around 5:30 am and presumed it was his mother going for her daily exercise. Caddick left behind all of her possessions, including her mobile phone. Although there was an extensive review of CCTV footage, her exact whereabouts after leaving her house were not known, as the footage did not cover the entire area from where she disappeared.

On 21 February 2021, a shoe containing a decomposed human foot was discovered washed up on Bournda Beach on the southern coast of New South Wales, just south of Tathra, some 500 kilometres (310 mi) from where Caddick was last seen. The shoe matched her size and description of the footwear she was seen wearing during the raid of her home on 11 November 2020. Subsequent DNA testing of samples gathered from her toothbrush, as well as from family members, confirmed the foot belonged to Caddick.

The foot's location matched the tidal and drift pattern modelling undertaken by the marine police, raising the possibility that if a body had entered the water near Dover Heights around the time of Caddick's disappearance it would likely reach the shore somewhere near the south-coast town of Bermagui, which is just 40 kilometres (25 mi) north of Tathra.

=== Hypotheses ===
It is not known how Caddick's foot ended up in the ocean. Criminologist Dr Xanthé Mallett pointed out that having lost a foot did not definitively mean that Caddick was dead, saying, "When it was just a foot I would caution against the possibility that somebody is deceased. You can survive without your foot." In an October 2021 interview, Koletti claimed that Caddick never stole any money and that someone killed his wife. Other theories included Caddick going into hiding or cutting off her own foot as a red herring. Alternatively, it has been theorised that Koletti was assisting her in hiding. In February 2023 an inquest was told that the police concluded she had probably died after jumping from the cliffs at Rodney Reserve, around 500 metres (1,600 ft) from her home.

=== Coronial inquest and findings ===
In May 2023, the deputy state coroner declared Caddick deceased after a coronial inquest but was unable to determine how she died. The deputy coroner said that there was a delay by Koletti in reporting his wife's disappearance and there were significant discrepancies in his accounts to police which gives rise to the strong suspicion that he was aware of his wife's movements over the previous two days but chose not to disclose them. The deputy coroner also said that questions around how, when and where Caddick died remained "problematical".

== Aftermath ==
In April 2021, after Caddick's presumed death, ASIC dropped 38 criminal charges against her. In November 2021, the court found that Caddick, through her company Maliver, had fraudulently appropriated tens of millions of dollars of investors' money, and operated without the required financial services licence between October 2012 and November 2020. It was announced that Caddick's possessions, including her A$6 million Sydney house, would be sold to partially reimburse the 72 clients who claimed that they were owed more than A$23 million. In February 2022, Koletti objected to the sale of the house, and the Federal Court gave Caddick's family six weeks to stake their claims over Caddick's house and a penthouse apartment in Edgecliff where Caddick's parents resided. Caddick's parents made a claim on the basis of handing their daughter $1.03 million on the understanding they would own part of the Edgecliff apartment and have life tenancy. In April 2022, Caddick's parents said in a statement filed in the Federal Court that "Melissa dishonestly and fraudulently" took their money.

In April 2022, Koletti made a claim through the Federal Court for a share of Caddick's assets, including her Gucci wedding dress, $7 million in shares, $2 million worth of jewellery, two properties he claimed were valued at $20 million and the proceeds from the sale of their luxury cars. In May 2022, the Federal Court ordered Koletti to vacate their house so it could be sold by liquidators; the house, purchased in 2014 for $6.2 million, was sold in October 2022 for a price reported in January 2023 to be $9.8 million. In December 2022, clothing, art, luxury goods and jewellery belonging to Caddick were sold at auction for $860,000.

== In popular culture ==
Caddick's life was dramatised in the Nine Network's television miniseries Underbelly: Vanishing Act (shortened to Vanishing Act in other markets) in 2022, with Caddick played by Kate Atkinson.

== See also ==
- List of solved missing person cases (2020s)
- List of unsolved deaths
