= Kate Mines =

American actress and producer

- Born: San Diego, California
- Education: University of California, Santa Cruz
- Occupation: Actress

Kate Mines is an American actress and producer best known for the web series Dropping the Soap and her role as Nurse Gloria on Grey's Anatomy.

== Filmography ==
Film and television
Year	Title	Role	Notes
2006-2015	Grey's Anatomy	Nurse Gloria	Recurring role (18 episodes)
2013	W.M.D.	Alexandra Tartakoff	
2016	Dropping the Soap	Kit Knockers	Series Regular (10 episodes)
2017	Doubt	Madeline Thomas	Episode: "Faith"
2015	The Mindy Project	Happy Wife	Episode: "No More Mr. Noishe Guy "
