= TLA Entertainment Group =

Privately held corporation based in Philadelphia, Pennsylvania

TLA Entertainment Group is a privately held corporation based in Philadelphia, Pennsylvania. It was founded in 1981.

Originally formed to operate a repertory movie theater, the company subsequently moved into catalog and online sales, retail stores, film festivals and film distribution. The catalog began as a pornographic mail order business and grew to include also gay and lesbian non-pornographic films and books and mainstream films.

== History ==
TLA stands for "Theater of the Living Arts". Now a concert venue, it was founded as an experimental theater group in the 1960s under the direction of Andre Gregory (of My Dinner with Andre fame). The group included Danny DeVito, Judd Hirsch, Sally Kirkland and Ron Leibman, who performed exclusively in the said theater, located on South Street in Philadelphia. By the mid- to late-60s, funding for the Theater was running out and the theater was converted to a movie house showing an eclectic mix of classic and foreign films.

In 1981, the founding partners of TLA Entertainment Group (Raymond Murray, Claire Brown-Kohler, Alex Roberts and Roman Czenchtuch) met and subsequently ran the theater. For the next six years the TLA was a repertory art movie theater. In addition, for four of those six years, the partners ran a small, first-run art house, the Roxy Screening Room, also located in Center City, Philadelphia.

The Theater of the Living Arts is no longer affiliated with TLA Entertainment Group.

On January 30, 2014, Sterling Genesis International of New York City acquired the company. G. Sterling Zinsmeyer became chairman of the group.

In 2015, the company launched the Dekkoo video streaming service.

== Video stores ==
In 1985, the first video store was opened next door to Theater of the Living Arts. The stores expanded into a chain, and by 2005 there were four stores in Philadelphia and one in New York. (The NYC store was in a building previously occupied by the 8th St. Playhouse.) Starting in 2007, the stores began closing, with the New York store closing first, followed by the Chestnut Hill and Society Hill locations in 2009, and the Rittenhouse Square location in 2011. The final store, TLA Bryn Mawr remained open until October 2012.

== Online sales ==
TLA Entertainment Group launched the TLAvideo website in 1997. The site sells gay and lesbian, American independent, international, Hollywood and pornographic DVDs and books.

== Film festivals ==
In 1994, TLA Entertainment Group President Raymond Murray started the Philadelphia International Gay & Lesbian Film Festival.

In 2001, TLA Entertainment Group assumed management of the Philadelphia Festival of World Cinema, now called The Philadelphia Film Festival. The two-week festival shows over 100 feature films from around the world. In order to better fund these events, in August 2001 TLA Entertainment Group spun them off and created the non-profit Philadelphia Film Society.

== Film distribution ==
TLA Releasing is the licensing division of TLA Entertainment. It is focused on the acquisition of distribution rights of international, independent, and gay and lesbian films to theaters and on DVD and VHS. TLA Releasing releases two films a month for the home entertainment market. The catalog of films is available online.

== Bibliography ==
TLA Entertainment Group has published two books:

- Bleiler, David A (2004). TLA Video & DVD Guide 2005: The Discerning Film Lover's Guide. St. Martin's Griffin. ISBN 978-0-312-31690-7.
- Murray, Raymond (1996). Images in the Dark: An Encyclopedia of Gay and Lesbian Film and Video (2nd rev ed.). Plume. ISBN 978-0-452-27627-7.
