= Underbelly: Vanishing Act =

Australian television miniseries

- Starring: Kate Atkinson
- No. of episodes: 2

Release
- Original network: Nine Network
- Original release: 3 April – 4 April 2022

Series chronology
- ← Previous; Squizzy

Underbelly: Vanishing Act (released in the UK as Vanishing Act) is a television miniseries based on the story of Melissa Caddick's disappearance. It first aired on the Nine Network in April 2022. It was the seventh season of the true crime anthology series Underbelly. It was written by Matt Ford and Michael Miller.

== Premise ==
Underbelly: Vanishing Act is based on the story of high-roller Melissa Caddick who was alleged to have embezzled $40 million before vanishing in November 2020, the day after the Australian Securities & Investments Commission executed a search warrant on her Dover Heights, Sydney home.

== Production ==
The series was first announced by the Nine Network in September 2021. It was produced by Screentime.

It was written by Matt Ford and Michael Miller.

In the UK, the series was shown as Vanishing Act on ITV1 in three 45-minute episodes between 18 December to 20 December 2023. Alongside the series, ITV1 aired a documentary titled The Real Vanishing Act - Missing Millionairess on 21 December 2023, produced by Naked (part of Fremantle). In 2024, the documentary aired on the Nine Network.

== Cast ==
- Kate Atkinson as Melissa Caddick
- Colin Friels as George K
- Jerome Velinsky as Anthony Koletti
- Tai Hara as Vincent Lee
- Maya Stange as Angie Beyersdorf
- Dylan Hare as Nash Malouf
- Ursula Mills as Phoebe Quinn
- Frankie J Holden as Ted Grimley
- Anne Tenney as Barbara Grimley
- Sophie Bloom as Wendy

== Viewership ==
No.	Title	Air date	Overnight ratings		Consolidated ratings		Total viewers	Ref(s)
No.	Title	Air date	Viewers	Rank	Viewers	Rank	Total viewers	Ref(s)
1	Part One	3 April 2022	719,000	4	144,000	3	863,000	
2	Part Two	4 April 2022	745,000	7	142,000	4	887,000	
