= W.M.D. =

- Promotional poster
- Directed by: Richard Halpern
- Written by: Mike Le; Ian Truitner
- Produced by: Jeffrey S. Magnussen; Ian Truitner; Richard Halpern
- Starring: Tom Kiesche; John Posey; Weetus Cren; Leila Birch; John Brickner; Kate Mines; Ahmed Best
- Cinematography: Kevin Burke
- Edited by: Julien Roussel
- Music by: Roman Kovalik
- Production company: Thousand Mile Media
- Distributed by: Lionsgate, Indican Pictures
- Release dates: May 23, 2013 (Cannes Film Festival); December 16, 2014
- Running time: 81 minutes
- Country: United States
- Language: English

W.M.D. is an American war drama/comedy film directed by Richard Halpern and starring Tom Kiesche, John Posey, Weetus Cren, Leila Birch, John Brickner and Kate Mines. It was produced by Jeffrey S. Magnussen, Ian Truitner and Richard Halpern, and written by Mike Le and Ian Truitner.

== Plot ==
The Iraq War remains one of the most contentious U.S. military interventions in the past three decades. Its destabilizing impact on the region gave rise to ISIS and a myriad of other issues for Iraq and its neighboring countries. However, the primary justifications for initiating the war, namely the presence of weapons of mass destruction (WMDs) and Saddam Hussein's alleged links to Al Qaeda, have since been proven unfounded. As a consequence, America now grapples with a pervasive problem of veterans afflicted by PTSD, resulting in violence, suicide, and homelessness.

In an alternate reality set in 2007, a group of dissatisfied soldiers stationed in Iraq take matters into their own hands by kidnapping the visiting U.S. President. Using the very techniques they were trained to employ against Hussein's former associates and suspected terrorists, they interrogate the President. Their objective is to extract from him the true motives behind the invasion of Iraq, as they have come to realize that the stated reasons were deceitful. However, time is of the essence for these soldiers, as the full might of the U.S. military is mobilized to liberate the President at any cost.

== Cast ==
- Tom Kiesche as Captain Hank Garrison
- John Posey as The President
- Weetus Cren as Sergeant Downy
- Leila Birch as Melody Stone
- John Brickner as Private First Class Riggs
- Kate Mines as Alexandra Tartakoff
- Jeff Prewett as Agent Stenson
- Ahmed Best as News Reporter
- Jeff Prewett as Agent Stenson
- Chris Torres as Steve
- Roy Abramsohn as Artichoke Anchor
- Victoria Barabas as Shawn Sanders
- Albert Kuo as Some Guy
- Darrell Britt-Gibson as Other Guy
- Mark Chaet as Francis McCarthy
- Scott Hoxby as Whit Whitley
- T.W. Leshner as Darrell
- Anastasia Roussel as Laura Reed
- Kerry Stein as Dr. Frieberg
- David Trice as Gerald Jones
- Jared Ward as Rupert Brannigan
- Jessica Rizo as Asia Velasquez
- Joseph Will as David Smiliski
- Burnell Tucker as Eugene Bowman

== Release ==
The film premiered in 2013 at Marché du Film at the Cannes Film Festival and was distributed by Indican Pictures in 2015. It was released under the title "President Down" in the United Kingdom.
