= Kate Atkinson (actress) =

Australian actress

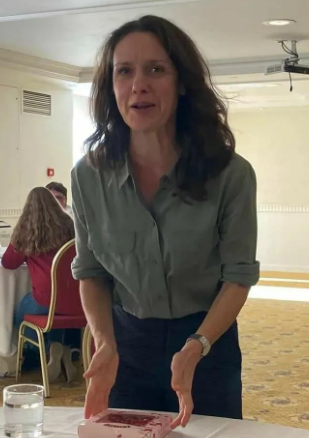
- Born: 28 June 1972 (age 54); Kalgoorlie, Western Australia
- Occupations: Actress, voice artist, theatre actor
- Years active: 1994–present
- Notable work: Wentworth; SeaChange; Offspring; Underbelly: Vanishing Act
- Height: 160 cm (5 ft 3 in)

Kate Atkinson (born 28 June 1972) is an Australian film, television and theatre actress. She is best known for her roles in television series SeaChange as police officer Karen Miller, Offspring as Renee and Wentworth as Vera Bennett.

== Early life ==
Atkinson was born in Kalgoorlie, Western Australia, on 28 June 1972 to an English mother and Tasmanian father. She was raised in Perth, Western Australia. Her older brother was actor John Atkinson, who died in 2026.

Atkinson studied English at Curtin University in Perth from 1990 to 1993, earning a BA with a double major in theatre and film and television.

== Career ==
Atkinson has had regular roles in the television series Fat Cow Motel, Blue Heelers, The Cooks and Kath & Kim. Her film roles include The Hard Word (2002), Japanese Story (2003) and The Jammed (2007).

From 2010 to 2012, Atkinson had a recurring role in the first three seasons of Offspring, playing Renee, opposite Asher Keddie.

Atkinson notably appeared in the long-running drama Wentworth as Deputy Governor (later Governor) and Industries Manager, Vera Bennett from season 1 in 2013, until the series finale in 2021. She reprised the role in 2020 when the series returned to production for season 8, after the show was renewed. Atkinson appeared in all 100 episodes of the show and was a part of the "100 club", alongside co-stars Jacquie Brennan, Katrina Milosevic and Robbie Magasiva. The "100 club" received a placard for their efforts.

In 2016, Atkinson appeared in a Melbourne Theatre Company production of Lungs. She returned to the MTC in 2017, for its production of Three Little Words.

Atkinson revealed in 2021 that she had planned to walk away from acting altogether before she was offered her role in Wentworth, as she was studying a Masters in International Politics at the time and said "I'll do a season. But I don't know if this thing has legs." She had believed that the show would not last more than a single season.

In March 2022, Channel 9 announced that Atkinson was named as the lead for Underbelly: Vanishing Act as con woman Melissa Caddick. She was cast in the role at the time when Caddick's story was of high public interest and it was announced just weeks after Caddick had disappeared from her home, sparking a manhunt to find her. The miniseries, which aired over two nights, told the story of Caddick's disappearance from a 'what if' angle, as the investigation into her disappearance was still ongoing and Caddick's foot had washed up on a beach some weeks later. After the show went to air Atkinson said "There was still a lot of hurt" for the victims of Caddick's crimes. The show aired to mostly negative reviews, where some labeled the show "in poor taste" and "tacky".

In September 2022, Atkinson appeared at the "Wentworth Con" fan convention in Melbourne alongside many others in the Wentworth cast. She also appeared frequently for events in the UK.

== Filmography ==
=== Film ===
Year	Title	Role	Notes
2000	Trapped	Jackie	Short film
2002	The Hard Word	Pamela	Feature film
2003	Japanese Story	Jackie	Feature film
2007	The Jammed	Gabi	Feature film
2024	The Hoist	Shaz	Short film

=== Television ===
Year	Title	Role	Notes	Ref
1996	The Man from Snowy River	Biddie O'Brien / Jeannie Drabble	Recurring role	
1997	Blue Heelers	Stacey Cooper / Stacey Norse	Recurring role	
1997	State Coroner	Ilana Summers	Episode: "Final Approach"	
1998–2000	SeaChange	Karen Miller	Regular role	
2003	Temptation	Ruth	TV film	
2003	Fat Cow Motel	Cassie Brown	Main role	
2003	CrashBurn	Deb Wallington	Episode: "Seven Letters or Less"	
2003	Kath & Kim	Clothing Store Assistant	Season 2, episode 4	
2004	Kath & Kim	Mother	Season 3, episode 2	
2004–2005	The Cooks	Ruth O'Neill	Main role	
2006	Doves of War	Sophie Morgan	1 episode	
2006	Sinchronicity	Helena	2 episodes	
2009	Rush	Freya	Season 2, 1 episode	
2010	Sleuth 101	Jacqui	Episode: "A Tan to Die For"	
2010–2012	Offspring	Renee	Recurring role (seasons 1–3)	
2012	Jack Irish: Black Tide	Simone Bendtson	TV film	
2013	The Doctor Blake Mysteries	Monica Patterson	Episode: "Still Waters"	
2013	Miss Fisher's Murder Mysteries	Maude Ashmead	Episode: "Death Comes Knocking"	
2013–2021	Wentworth	Vera Bennett	Main role, 100 episodes	
2016	Molly	Mother	Miniseries	
2016–2021	Jack Irish	Simone	Regular role	
2022	Underbelly: Vanishing Act	Melissa Caddick	Main role, 2 episodes	

== Podcasts ==
Year	Title	Role	Notes	Ref
2017	Interrogation Room	Self	Podcast	
2021	Nova 100	Self	Podcast / Radio	
2022	Isolation Interviews	Self	Podcast	
2022	Hot off the Press	Self	Podcast	

== Stage ==
Year	Title	Role	Notes
2005	Serial Killers	Simone	Derby Playhouse
2007	Romantic Comedy	Phoebe Craddock	UK tour
2009	Rockabye	Julia	MTC
2010	Becky Shaw	Becky Shaw	Echelon
2015	The Waiting Room	Sue / Catrina / Robin	MTC
2016	Lungs	W	MTC
2017	Three Little Words	Annie	MTC
2024	I'm With Her	Julia Gillard	
2026	A Room With A View	Miss Lavish / Mrs Honeychurch	Belvoir St
