= Ian Truitner =

American filmmaker and entrepreneur (born 1972)

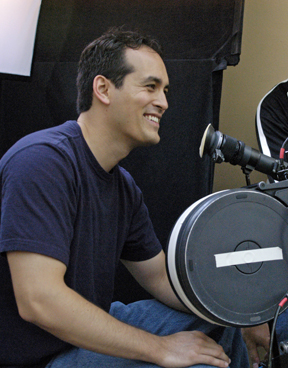
- Born: December 15, 1972 (age 53); St. Paul, Minnesota
- Education: University of Minnesota (BA) Penn State University (MBA)
- Occupations: Filmmaker, entrepreneur
- Years active: 2006-present
- Organization: RANDIAN (since 2012)
- Website: iantruitner.com

Ian Truitner is an American filmmaker and entrepreneur.

== Biography ==
Ian Truitner studied at the University of Minnesota, Penn State University and Massachusetts Institute of Technology. He was awarded Alumni of Notable Achievement by the University of Minnesota in 2017. Truitner is a U.S. Army veteran, serving during Operation Desert Storm.

As a filmmaker Truitner's work includes Teleios, W.M.D., and Cutting Room. Truitner has won over a dozen international film awards for his works as a director and producer

Truitner has written multiple patents, including an AI machine learning visual learning system and an interactive streaming video platform for RANDIAN, a company funded by Amanda Crew, R&R Ventures and Quake Capital. He presented RANDIAN technology to Prince William and Catherine, Duchess of Cambridge at the Variety Venture Capital and New Media Summit.

During the 2020 pandemic Truitner directed a campaign to raise funds for the American Nurses Association's philanthropic arm the American Nurses Foundation. The spot featuring Rita Wilson, Constance Wu, Noah Wyle, Kate Flannery, Joan Lunden, Angélica María, Parminder Nagra, Jen Lilley and Simon Helberg was created to raise funds for nurses treating COVID-19 patients.

=== Credits ===
| Year | Title | Credit | Notes |
|---|---|---|---|
| 2024 | Telep⦻rter | Writer, director | Brooklyn SciFi Film Festival |
| 2022 | Aix-Hale | Writer, director | Montreal International Black Film Festival |
| 2016 | Teleios | Writer, director | Boston Science Fiction Film Festival |
| 2013 | W.M.D. | Writer, producer | Lionsgate Films |
| 2013 | Coffee and Sugar | Writer, director | Cannes Film Festival Short Film Corner |
| 2008 | Expecting Love | Co-Producer | Seattle Polish Film Festival |
| 2008 | Dragonlance: Dragons of Autumn Twilight | Editor | Paramount Pictures |
| 2008 | Unstable Fables: The Goldilocks and the 3 Bears Show | Editor | The Jim Henson Company |
| 2006 | Cutting Room | Writer, director | Milan International Film Festival |
| 2006 | F8 | Writer, director | New York International Independent Film & Video Festival |
| 2005 | Untold Stories of the ER | Writer | 8 episodes |
| 2005 | Dies Irae | Writer, director | Palm Beach International Film Festival |
| 2003 | Salome's Kiss | Writer, director | Hollywood Shorts |
| 2001 | Richard Roe | Writer, director | Seattle International Film Festival |
| 1999 | The Interview | Writer, director | Sarasota Film Festival |
