= Dropping the Soap =

- Created by: Paul Witten; Mandy Fabian; Kate Mines
- Written by: Mandy Fabian; Paul Witten; Kate Mines
- Directed by: Ellie Kanner
- Starring: Paul Witten; Kate Mines; Suzanne Friedline; Michael McKiddy; Jane Lynch
- Country of origin: United States
- Original language: English
- No. of seasons: 1
- No. of episodes: 10

Production
- Executive producers: Paul Witten; Kate Mines; Mandy Fabian; Ellie Kanner; Jane Lynch
- Running time: 96 minutes

Original release
- Network: Dekkoo; Amazon
- Release: March 7, 2017

Dropping the Soap is an American comedy web series that parodies the soap opera genre, created by Paul Witten, Mandy Fabian and Kate Mines. It goes behind-the-scenes of a struggling daytime soap opera called Collided Lives.

== Premise ==
In the new era of television, daytime soap opera Collided Lives struggles to stay afloat. The cast and crew, including leading man Julian Draker (Paul Witten) and new executive producer Olivia Vanderstein (Jane Lynch), try to hold things together.

== Development and production ==
Production was announced in March 2013 with Lisa Kudrow, Jane Lynch, Dan Bucatinsky, Don Roos, Damon Bethel and Joseph Gomes acting as executive producers. By the time the series premiered in 2017, only Lynch remained as executive producer joined by Paul Witten, Kate Mines, Mandy Fabian and Ellie Kanner. After initial attempts to get a brand involved, Witten and the others succeeded in finding independent financing of the 10 twelve-minute episodes on their own.

== Reception ==
The series debuted on Dekkoo in March 2017. The series was also made available on streaming platforms Amazon Prime Instant Video, Roku, Google Play, WithLove and iTunes. Jane Lynch won the Primetime Emmy Award for Outstanding Actress in a Short Form Comedy or Drama Series.
