= Dekkoo =

Streaming service

Dekkoo is a Philadelphia-based subscription streaming service with a focus on LGBT+ related content, particularly by and for gay men. It features a mixture of programs from other sources and original content, primarily focused on international cinema, and derives its income from subscription fees rather than advertising. It is available as an add-on channel on Amazon Prime, YouTube TV, Xfinity X1, and as an app on Roku, Apple TV, Chromecast, and Amazon Fire.

The service was co-founded in 2015 by Derek Curl and Brian Sokel. The launch followed the 2014 acquisition of TLA Entertainment Group in 2014.

During the COVID-19 pandemic in 2020, the company launched a short-film contest.

== Dekkoo Originals ==
Dekkoo is home to a growing collection of Dekkoo Originals (exclusive content to Dekkoo).

Dekkoo Original Films
Title	Director	Genre	Release date
Throuple	Greyson Horst	Comedy	September 2, 2023
The Prodigy	Omar Salas Zamora	Horror	October 8, 2024
The Summer With Carmen	Zacharias Mavroeidis	Comedy	September 2, 2023
Ernesto	x	x	x
Jackpot	x	x	x
Guardian Angel	x	x	x
If I'm Good	x	x	x
Vilom	x	x	x
A Halloween Trick	x	x	x
The Lawyer	x	x	x
The Big Snore	x	x	x
Max	x	x	x
Poltergays	x	x	x
Do We Really Have To Say Goodbye?	x	x	x
Mani	x	x	x
The Day Began Yesterday	x	x	x
Honey Do List	x	x	x
The Handyman	x	x	x
Is This A Date?	x	x	x
Mr. Leather	x	x	x
45 Days Away From You	x	x	x
How to Get From Here to There	x	x	x
Faces	x	x	x

Dekkoo Original Series
Title	Genre	Premiere	Director	Seasons
Bad Together	Drama, LGBT	07/25/2024	Jono Mitchell	1
Danny Will Die Alone	Comedy, LGBT	05/16/2024	Jack Tracy	3
Boy Culture: Generation X	Comedy, LGBT	02/08/2024	Q. Allan Brocka	1
Marriage of Inconvenience	Comedy, LGBT	04/06/2023	Jason T. Gaffney, Diliana Deltcheva	1
Peckham Mix	LGBT	06/15/2023	Marco De Luca	
Historical Homos	Podcast	06/09/2023	Brendan Patrick Hughes	1
Adam In Fragments	Crime	11/17/2022	Omar Salas Zamora and Calvin Picou	1
Here Comes Your Man	Comedy, Romance	06/24/2021	Omar Salas Zamora	2
So Far, So Close	LGBT	02/05/2021	x	1
Soul Mate	LGBT	10/30/2020	Kevin James Thornton	2
Everything I Like	LGBT	09/30/2020	Sergio Acosta, Guillermo Rovira	1
Stranger Hearts	Comedy, LGBT	03/12/2020	Curtis Casella, Kyle Cabral	1
The Third	Drama, LGBT	10/24/2019	Matt McClelland, Bishal Dutta, Matthew Lynn	1
OUT on Stage	Stand-Up Comedy	01/17/2019	Samuel Brownfield	1
Paper Boys	Romance	05/10/2018	Kyle Cabral, Curtis Casella	1
I'm Fine	Drama, LGBT	04/19/2017	Brandon Kirby	3
Love Is Blind	Reality TV	02/14/2017	x	1
Feral	Drama	10/06/2016	Morgan Jon Fox	1
