= Fox News controversies =

Bias allegations and other controversies at Fox News

The logo of Fox News

Fox News is an American basic cable and satellite television channel owned by Fox Corporation. Since its creation by Rupert Murdoch's News Corporation in 1996, the channel has been the subject of several controversies and allegations.

Fox News has been described by academics, media figures, political figures, and watchdog groups as being biased in favor of the Republican Party in its news coverage, as perpetuating conservative bias, and as misleading their audiences in relation to science, notably climate change and COVID-19.

Fox News was sued for defamation in 2021 by voting machine companies Dominion Voting Systems and Smartmatic, alleging the network's hosts and guests knowingly promoted falsehoods that their voting machines were rigged to prevent Donald Trump's reelection in the 2020 presidential election. The companies sought a total of $4.3 billion in damages. Fox News agreed to pay $787.5 million to resolve the suit.

== Allegations of bias ==
=== Political alignment ===
Fox News has been described as broadcasting content designed to provoke negative emotional responses that align with political or other narratives.

Fox News has been identified as practicing biased and false reporting in favor of the Republican Party, its politicians, and conservative causes, while portraying the Democratic Party in a negative light. Fox News has been characterized by critics, commentators, and researchers as an advocacy news organization (Note: Multiple sources:) and as damaging to the integrity of news overall. It has been criticized for sharing propaganda. (Note: Multiple sources have described Fox News as propaganda including researchers, news organizations, Republican politicians, former Fox hosts and employees, and commentators.) The network is pro-Trump. During and after the 2020 presidential election, its primetime hosts promoted Trump and the Republican Party, and host Jeanine Pirro was in communication with the chair of the Republican National Committee.

By 2017, a growing number of studies and academic literature found Fox's prime-time programming engaging in rhetorical and nonfactual themes similar to propaganda and not journalism or persuasion. Academic studies have argued that it has played a major role in boosting Republican turnout in American elections and that its role in American politics has been underestimated by political and communications scholars. Fox has been described as operating in an information silo where its audience views other media sources as "too liberal", and thus rely on Fox and no other forms of news media. Researchers and commentators have compared conservative Fox News as similar in purpose to liberal MSNBC, but that "the proportion of Fox News statements that are mostly false or worse is almost 50 percent higher than for MSNBC, and more than twice that of CNN".

Its news coverage has gradually shifted further rightwards over time. Fox's most popular programs such as Hannity and Tucker Carlson Tonight do not make any claims to be accurate or fact-checked, and have little to no distinction between news and commentary. Media analyst Brian Stelter, who has written extensively about the network, observed in 2021 that in more recent years it had adjusted its programming to present "less news on the air and more opinions-about-the-news" throughout the day, on concerns it was losing viewers to more conservative competitors that were presenting such content.

In documents filed as part of the Smartmatic v. Fox News defamation lawsuit (2025), internal survey responses from Fox News employees, conducted between August 24 and September 8, 2020, revealed concerns about the network’s political alignment and editorial practices. Several employees stated that they believed the network was “intentionally helping Donald Trump and the Republican Party,” described its programming as “sexist, racist, and right-wing,” and expressed moral discomfort with their work environment. For example, one employee wrote that they felt “ashamed to tell others I work here.” Some comments criticized high-profile hosts by name for promoting what the respondents characterized as conspiracy theories and partisan narratives.

=== Political figures ===
Former Democratic National Committee chairman Howard Dean has referred to Fox News as a "right-wing propaganda machine", and several Democratic politicians have boycotted events hosted or sponsored by the network. In 2007, several major Democratic presidential candidates (Hillary Clinton, John Edwards, Barack Obama, and Bill Richardson) boycotted or dropped out of Fox News-sponsored or -hosted debates. The DNC reaffirmed their boycott in 2019.

Similar accusations were levied against Fox News in response to its decision to exclude Ron Paul and Duncan Hunter from the January 5, 2008, Republican primary debate. In response, many individuals and organizations petitioned Fox News to reconsider its decision. When Fox News refused to change its position and continued to exclude Paul and Hunter, the New Hampshire Republican Party officially announced it would withdraw as a Fox News partner in the forum.

While Fox News has been criticized for its tendency to support the Republican Party and its interests, David Frum, a former speechwriter for George W. Bush, has also said, "Republicans originally thought that Fox worked for us and now we're discovering we work for Fox."

=== Media figures ===
CNN personality Larry King said in a January 17, 2007, interview with the Chicago Sun-Times: "They're a Republican brand. They're an extension of the Republican Party with some exceptions, [like] Greta Van Susteren. But I don't begrudge them that. [Fox News CEO] Roger Ailes is an old friend. They've been nice to me. They've said some very nice things about me. Not [Bill] O'Reilly, but I don't watch him."

Writing for the Los Angeles Times, Republican and conservative columnist Jonah Goldberg stated: "Look, I think liberals have reasonable gripes with Fox News. It does lean to the right, primarily in its opinion programming but also in its story selection (which is fine by me) and elsewhere. But it's worth remembering that Fox is less a bastion of ideological conservatism and more a populist, tabloid-like network."

Then-Fox News host Bill O'Reilly stated in 2004, in the context of the Iraq War, that "Fox does tilt right", but that the network does not "actively campaign or try to help Bush-Cheney."

=== Media watchdogs ===
Progressive media watchdog groups such as Fairness & Accuracy in Reporting (FAIR) and Media Matters for America, have argued that Fox News' reporting contains conservative editorializing within news stories. FAIR has asserted that the ratio of conservative to non-conservative guests on Fox News shows strongly favors conservatives. In a study of a nineteen-week period from January 2001 to May 2001 on Special Report with Brit Hume, the ratio was 25:3, and FAIR obtained similar data from other Fox News shows.

The conservative watchdog group Accuracy in Media has claimed that there was a conflict of interest in Fox News' co-sponsorship of the May 15, 2007, Republican presidential debate, pointing out that candidate Rudy Giuliani's law firm had tackled copyright protection and legislation on the purchase of cable television lineups for News Corporation, the then-parent company of Fox News, Fox Sports, Foxtel, Fox Footy, Fox Sports News, Fox Television Studios, Fox Television Stations, Foxstar Productions, 20th Television, 20th Century Fox Television, 20th Century Fox, Fox Searchlight Pictures, 20th Century Fox Home Entertainment and DirecTV, and suggesting that Fox News might be biased in favor of Giuliani's candidacy for the Republican presidential nomination.

=== Response ===
Fox News has publicly denied such charges, stating that the reporters in the newsroom provide separate, neutral reporting, while acknowledging their opinion programming is not intended to be neutral.

== Ownership and management ==
Australian-born media mogul Rupert Murdoch is the chairman of Fox Corporation, the News Corp subsidiary which owns Fox News. He has been a subject of controversy and criticism as a result of his extensive interests in print and broadcast media. In the United States, he is the publisher of the New York Post newspaper and the magazine The Weekly Standard. Accusations against him include the "dumbing down" of news and introducing "mindless vulgarity" in place of genuine journalism, and having his own outlets produce news that serves his own political and financial agendas. According to the BBC News website: "To some, he is little less than the devil incarnate, to others, the most progressive mover-and-shaker in the media business."

Then-presidential candidate George W. Bush's cousin, John Prescott Ellis, was Fox News' projection team manager during the 2000 presidential election. After speaking numerous times on election night with his cousins George and Jeb, Ellis, at 2:16 AM, reversed Fox News' call for Florida as a state won by Al Gore. Critics allege this was a premature decision, given the impossibly razor-thin margin (officially 537 of 5.9 million votes), which created the "lasting impression that Bush 'won' the White House – and all the legal wrangling down in Florida is just a case of Democratic 'snippiness'." Others, such as researcher John Lott, have responded that, by this reasoning, Fox News and the other networks were even more premature in initially calling the state for Al Gore, a call made while polls were still open, and which may have depressed voter turnout for Bush and actually affected the election, whereas the call for Bush later could not have, as the polls were closed by then.

On January 9, 2010, the son-in-law of Rupert Murdoch and the husband of Murdoch's daughter Elisabeth, Matthew Freud, stated he and other members of the media mogul's family are "ashamed and sickened" by the right-leaning tendencies of Fox News in the opening salvo in a bid to displace Roger Ailes, the founder, and CEO of Fox News. In a New York Times profile on Ailes, Freud was quoted saying "I am by no means alone within the family or the company in being ashamed and sickened by Roger Ailes' horrendous and sustained disregard of the journalist standards that News Corporation, its founder and every other global media business aspires to. What you heard was a declaration of war. There are, practically speaking, now two factions inside of News Corp: Ailes and Fox News, and the Murdoch children – with Rupert caught between them." Although Murdoch did not respond to the remark directly, a spokesperson for News Corporation put a statement after a Financial Times inquiry claiming "Matthew Freud's opinions are his own and in no way reflect the views of Rupert Murdoch, who is proud of Roger Ailes and Fox News." Tim Arango also claims in Murdoch's 2008 biography that he voiced concerns privately to Ailes about his conduct, claiming he was purportedly "embarrassed" by Fox News. Murdoch denied that claim.

In June 2010, News Corporation donated $1 million to the Republican Governors Association. News Corporation's political action committee had previously split their contributions to Democrats and Republicans by a margin of 54% to 46%, respectively.

On March 20, 2018, Fox News contributor Lt. Col. Ralph Peters left the network. Referencing the Trump administration, Peters stated that Fox News had become a "propaganda machine for a destructive and ethically ruinous administration" and objected to the network helping "Putin's agenda by making light of Russian penetration of our elections and the Trump campaign". On March 22, 2019, Vox interviewed media critic Tom Rosenstiel, who argued Fox News had shifted from a partisan network to a propaganda network in support of President Donald Trump.

== Reports, polls, surveys and studies ==
=== Polls and surveys ===
A poll conducted by Rasmussen Reports during September 2004 found that Fox News was seen as second to CBS as the most politically biased network in the public view. 37% of respondents thought CBS, in the wake of the Killian documents controversy, was trying to help elect Senator John Kerry, while 34% of respondents said they believed that Fox News' goal was to "help elect Bush". However, a poll by Public Policy Polling in January 2010 found Fox News to be the only U.S. television news network to receive a positive rating by the public for trustworthiness, with results strongly split depending on the political affiliation of the respondents. A survey by the Pew Research Center for the People and the Press showed "a striking rise in the politicization of cable TV news audiences ... This pattern is most apparent with the fast-growing Fox News Channel." Another Pew survey of news consumption found that Fox News has not suffered a decline in credibility with its audience, with one in four (25%) saying they believe all or most of what they see on the network, virtually unchanged since Fox News was first tested in 2000.

According to the results of a 2006 study by the Project for Excellence in Journalism found that Fox News was rarely cited by 547 surveyed journalists as an outlet taking an ideological stance in its coverage, and most identified as advocating conservative political positions. In the 2004 survey, 69% of national journalists cited Fox News as being especially conservative in its coverage of news.

A 2019 Pew survey found that Fox News is the fifth most trusted source in America for political and election news, with 43% of all polled voters (compared with 47% of second-place CNN and 34% of ninth-place MSNBC). However, it is also the least trusted with 40% of all polled voters (compared with 32% of second-place CNN and 26% of fourth-place MSNBC).

=== Studies and reports ===
The "2011 State of the News Media" Report by the Pew Center on Excellence in Journalism found that in 2010, Fox News had an average daytime audience of 1.2 million and nighttime viewership of 1.1 million, higher than its cable competitors but down 11% and 9% respectively from 2009. Fox News' cumulative audience (unique viewers who watched at least sixty minutes in an average month) was 41.1 million, coming in second to CNN with 41.7 million. For 2010, CNN's digital network continued to lead Fox News' digital network online; CNN with 35.7 million unique visitors per month, compared to Fox News' 15.5 million. For the first time Fox News outspent its competitors, with a total news investment of $686 million. 72% of this investment went to program costs, reflecting their focus on high-profile hosts. They also increased their revenues 17% over 2009 to $1.5 billion, well ahead of second-place CNN at $1.2 billion.

==== Content analysis studies ====
The Project on Excellence in Journalism report in 2006 showed that 68 percent of Fox News cable stories contained personal opinions, as compared to MSNBC at 27 percent and CNN at 4 percent. The "content analysis" portion of their 2005 report also concluded that "Fox was measurably more one-sided than the other networks, and Fox News Channel journalists were more opinionated on the air."

A 2006 University of California, Berkeley, study cited that there was a correlation between the presence of Fox News in cable markets and increases in Republican votes in those markets. A 2010 study found that with respect to coverage of the wars in Iraq and Afghanistan in 2005, "Fox News was much more sympathetic to the [Bush] administration than NBC."

==== Studies of reporting bias ====
In a 2006 academic content analysis of election news, Rasmussen Reports showed that the 2004 election coverage from Fox News favored George W. Bush significantly more than John Kerry. In a 2010 study of the news coverage of the 2004 political party conventions, Morris and Francia found that Fox News' reporting was more negative toward the Democratic convention and gave Republicans more opportunity to voice their message than the other networks. The study also found that viewers who relied on Fox News' coverage exhibited attitude change toward both candidates, but particularly a lowering opinion toward Kerry. In contrast the study found that CNN's coverage was more fair and balanced.

A study published in November 2005 by Tim Groseclose, a professor of political science at UCLA, scoring political bias from twenty mainstream news reporting outlets, concluded that all "except Fox News' Special Report and The Washington Times, received scores to the left of the average member of Congress." In particular, Special Report with Brit Hume had an Americans for Democratic Action (ADA) rating that was right of the political center. Groseclose's model used the number of times a host cited a particular think tank on his or her program and compared it with the number of times a member of Congress cited a think tank, correlating that with the politician's ADA rating.

Geoff Nunberg, a professor of linguistics at UC Berkeley and a National Public Radio (NPR) commentator, criticized the methodology of Groseclose's study and labeled its conclusions invalid. He pointed to what he saw as Groseclose's reliance on interpretations of facts and data that were taken from sources that were not, in his view, credible. Groseclose and Professor Jeff Milyo rebutted, saying Nunberg "shows a gross misunderstanding [of] our statistical method and the actual assumptions upon which it relies." Mark Liberman (a professor of computer science and the director of Linguistic Data Consortium at the University of Pennsylvania), who helped post Groseclose and Milyo's rebuttal, later posted how the statistical methods used to calculate this bias pose faults. Liberman concluded "that many if not most of the complaints directed against G&M are motivated in part by ideological disagreement — just as much of the praise for their work is motivated by ideological agreement. It would be nice if there were a less politically fraught body of data on which such modeling exercises could be explored."

A December 2007 study by Samuel R. Lichter, of the self-described nonpartisan Center for Media and Public Affairs, found that Fox News' evaluations of all of the 2008 Democratic presidential candidates combined was 51% positive and 49% negative, while the network's evaluations of the Republican presidential candidates 51% negative and 49% positive. The study, however, did find that Fox News' coverage was less negative toward Republican candidates than the coverage of broadcast networks.

A study by Media Matters for America found that between August 1 and October 1, 2013, on Fox News, "69 percent of guests and 75 percent of mentions cast doubt on climate science," compared to "[half] of those quoted in The Wall Street Journal ... about 29 percent in the Los Angeles Times, about 17 percent in The Washington Post and about 12 percent in Bloomberg News." Fox News' argument against criticism that it disproportionately represents the views of climate change deniers was to itself deny the factual figures which indicate that 97% of climate science experts worldwide hold the consensus view of human-caused global warming. A 2012 report by the Union of Concerned Scientists found that, from February 2012 to July 2012, 93% of global warming coverage by Fox News was misleading. The report put the figure significantly lower—81 percent—for The Wall Street Journal. The misleading statements identified in the report included "dismissals of human-caused climate change, disparaging comments about individual scientists, rejections of climate science as a body of knowledge, and cherry picking of data." A similar 2013 report, also conducted by the Union of Concerned Scientists, found that 28% of global warming coverage by Fox News was accurate, a nine-fold increase from the aforementioned report but still significantly behind CNN and MSNBC respectively (70% and 92%).

Croft concluded that Fox News coverage glorified the Iraq War and its reporting framed the discussion in such a way as to drown out critics. He quotes Christiane Amanpour as stating that there was a culture of self-censorship created by "the administration and its foot soldiers at Fox News".

A May 2017 study conducted by Harvard University's Shorenstein Center on Media, Politics and Public Policy examined coverage of President Trump's first 100 days in office by all major mainstream media outlets and broadcast networks including CNN, HLN, Fox News, MSNBC, NBC, ABC and CBS. It found that, altogether, Trump received 80% negative coverage from the media, and that he received the least negative coverage on Fox News – 52% negative and 48% positive.

==== Tests of knowledge of Fox News viewers ====
A study by the Program on International Policy Attitudes (PIPA) at the University of Maryland School of Public Affairs, as published in the Winter 03–04 issue of the Political Science Quarterly, reported that poll-based findings indicated that viewers of Fox News Channel, the Fox broadcast network and local Fox affiliates, including in New York City and Los Angeles, were more likely than viewers of other news networks to hold three misperceptions:

- 67% of Fox News Channel viewers erroneously believed that the "U.S. has found clear evidence in Iraq that Saddam Hussein was working closely with the al Qaeda terrorist organization" (compared with 56% for CBS, 49% for NBC, 48% for CNN, 45% for ABC, 16% for NPR/PBS).
- The erroneous belief that "The U.S. has found Weapons of Mass Destruction in Iraq" was held by 33% of Fox News Channel viewers and only 23% of CBS viewers, 19% for ABC, 20% for NBC, 20% for CNN and 11% for NPR/PBS.
- 35% of Fox News Channel viewers erroneously believed that "the majority of people [in the world] favor the U.S. having gone to war" with Iraq (compared with 28% for CBS, 27% for ABC, 24% for CNN/HLN, 20% for NBC, 5% for NPR/PBS).

In response, conservative columnist Ann Coulter, a frequent guest on Fox News, characterized the PIPA findings as "misperceptions of pointless liberal factoids" and called it a "hoax poll". Bill O'Reilly called the study "absolute crap". Roger Ailes referred to the study as "an old push poll". James Taranto, editor of OpinionJournal.com, The Wall Street Journal's online editorial page, called the poll "pure propaganda". PIPA issued a clarification on October 17, 2003, stating that, "The findings were not meant to and cannot be used as a basis for making broad judgments about the general accuracy of the reporting of various networks or the general accuracy of the beliefs of those who get their news from those networks. Only a substantially more comprehensive study could undertake such broad research questions," and stated "that the correlation between viewing Fox News and holding misperceptions does not prove that Fox News' presentation caused the misperceptions", inferring that causality is not necessary to prove correlation.

PIPA also conducted a statistical study on purported misinformation evidenced by registered voters before the 2010 midterm election. According to the results of the study, "... false or misleading information is widespread in the general information environment ..." but viewers of Fox News were more likely to be misinformed on specific issues when compared to viewers of comparable media, that this likelihood also increased proportionally to the frequency of viewing Fox News and that these findings showed statistical significance.

A 2007 Pew Research Center poll of general political knowledge ("Who is the governor of your state?", "Who is the President of Russia?") indicated that Fox News viewers scored 35% in the high-knowledge area, the same as the national average. This was not significantly different than local news, network news, and morning news, and was slightly lower than CNN (41%). Viewers of The O'Reilly Factor (51%) scored in the high category along with Rush Limbaugh (50%), NPR (51%), major newspapers (54%), Newshour with Jim Lehrer (53%) The Daily Show (54%) and The Colbert Report (54%).

A 2010 Stanford University survey found "more exposure to Fox News was associated with more rejection of many mainstream scientists' claims about global warming, [and] with less trust in scientists". A 2011 Kaiser Family Foundation survey on U.S. misperceptions about health care reform found that Fox News viewers had a poorer understanding of the new laws and were more likely to believe in falsehoods about the Affordable Care Act, such as cuts to Medicare benefits and the death panel myth. A 2010 Ohio State University study of public misperceptions about the so-called "Ground Zero Mosque", officially named Park51, found that viewers who relied on Fox News were 66% more likely to believe incorrect rumors than those with a "low reliance" on Fox News.

In 2011, a study by Fairleigh Dickinson University found that Fox News viewers living in New Jersey were less well-informed than people who did not watch any news at all. The study employed objective questions, such as whether Hosni Mubarak was still in power in Egypt.

== Internal memos and email ==
=== Daily memos ===
Fox News executives exert a degree of editorial control over the content of the network's daily reporting. The channel's vice president of news, John Moody, controls content by writing memos to the news department staff. In the documentary Outfoxed, former Fox News employees talk about the inner workings of the channel. In memos from the documentary, Moody instructs employees on how to approach particular stories and on what stories to approach. Critics of Fox News claim that the instructions on many of the memos indicate a conservative bias. The Washington Post quoted Larry C. Johnson, a former Fox News contributor, describing the Moody memos as "talking points instructing us what the themes are supposed to be, and God help you if you stray."

Photocopied memos from Moody instructed Fox News' on-air anchors and reporters to use positive language when discussing anti-abortion viewpoints, the Iraq War, and tax cuts, as well as requesting that the Abu Ghraib prisoner abuse scandal be put in context with the other violence in the area. Such memos were reproduced for the film Outfoxed, which included Moody quotes such as, "The soldiers [seen on Fox News in Iraq] in the foreground should be identified as 'sharpshooters,' not 'snipers,' which carries a negative connotation."

Two days after the 2006 midterm election, The Huffington Post reported that its news department had acquired a copy of a leaked internal memo from Moody that recommended the following: "... [L]et's be on the lookout for any statements from the Iraqi insurgents, who must be thrilled at the prospect of a Dem-controlled congress." Within hours of the memo's publication, Fox News anchor Martha McCallum went on-air on the program The Live Desk with reports of Iraqi insurgents cheering the firing of Donald Rumsfeld and the results of the election.

=== Bill Sammon email ===
In December 2010, Media Matters for America released a leaked October 2009 email between Fox News Washington managing editor Bill Sammon and the network's senior producers, which seemed to issue directives slanting network's coverage of President Barack Obama's health care reform efforts. In the email, Sammon instructed producers to not use the phrase "public option" when discussing a key measure of President Obama's reform bill, and instead use the terms "government option" or "government-run health insurance[,]" noting negative connotations; Sammon also suggested that the qualifier "so-called" be used before any proper mention of the public option. Another email by Fox News senior vice president Michael Clemente accepted Sammon's conditions. Critics claimed that Sammon took advice from Republican pollster Frank Luntz, who appeared on Hannity shortly before the email was written and made the same suggestions in identifying the public option. Critics also noticed that reporters and panelists on Special Report with Bret Baier used the term "public option" before the email was sent, but used the term "government option" immediately afterward. Sammon, in an interview with Howard Kurtz for The Daily Beast, defended the directive and denied he was trying to skew Fox News' coverage.

Later that month, Media Matters released an email by Sammon from December 2009, in which he pressured Fox News reporters to assert that "theories are based upon data that critics have called into question" in light of the Climatic Research Unit email controversy.

== English Wikipedia edits ==
In August 2007, a new utility, WikiScanner, revealed that English Wikipedia articles relating to Fox News had been edited from IP addresses owned by Fox News, though it was not possible to determine exactly who the editors were. The tool showed that the article for Shepard Smith was edited from Fox News computers, removing mention of an arrest.

== Photo manipulation ==
=== 2008 ===
Fox News Channel image of Steinberg superimposed on a poodle, and Reddicliffe superimposed on the man holding the poodle's leash

Left: Original photo of Jacques Steinberg. Right: Photo aired on Fox News Channel.

Left: Original photo of Steven Reddicliffe. Right: Photo aired on Fox News Channel.

On the July 2, 2008, edition of Fox & Friends, cohosts Brian Kilmeade and Steve Doocy aired photos of New York Times reporter Jacques Steinberg and Times television editor Steven Reddicliffe that appeared to have been crudely doctored and photoshopped, apparently in order to portray the journalists unflatteringly. This occurred during a discussion of a June 28 piece in the Times, which pointed out what Steinberg called "ominous trends" in Fox News' ratings.

According to Media Matters, the photos depict Steinberg with yellowed teeth, "his nose and chin widened, and his ears made to protrude further." The other image, of Reddicliffe, had similar yellow teeth, as well as "dark circles ... under his eyes, and his hairline has been moved back." During the discussion, Doocy called the Times report, written by Steinberg, a "hit piece" ordered up by Reddicliffe. The broadcast then showed an image of Steinberg's face superimposed over a picture of a poodle, while Reddicliffe's face was superimposed over the man holding the poodle's leash.

Times culture editor Sam Sifton called Fox News photos "disgusting", and the criticism of the paper's reporting a "specious and meritless claim" while denying that it was a "hit piece".

=== 2020 ===
In June 2020, Fox News' website published digitally altered photographs of Seattle's Capitol Hill Autonomous Zone to include a man armed with an assault rifle from earlier Seattle protests; also added to the photographs were smashed windows from other parts of Seattle. In a separate incident, the Fox News website ran articles about protests in Seattle, with accompanying photos of a burning city actually being from Saint Paul, Minnesota, the previous month. Although the Capitol Hill Autonomous Zone was peacefully occupied, "Fox's coverage contributed to the appearance of armed unrest", stated The Washington Post. The manipulated and wrongly used images were removed, with Fox News stating that it "regrets these errors".

In July 2020, Fox News aired a photo that edited out President Donald Trump from a photo where he was seen posing with Melania Trump, Jeffrey Epstein, and Ghislaine Maxwell at Mar-a-Lago which was shown during a segment about Maxwell's arrest at the time. Fox News later apologized for the edit, claiming it was a mistake.

== September 2009 newspaper ad ==
On September 18, 2009, Fox News took out full-page ads in The Washington Post, the New York Post, and The Wall Street Journal with a prominent caption reading, "How did ABC, CBS, NBC, MSNBC, and CNN miss this story?" with pictures of a Tea Party movement protest on the U.S. Capitol lawn from September 12. A still picture in the ad was in fact taken from a CNN broadcast covering the event. The veracity of the ad was called into question on the air by then-CNN commentator Rick Sanchez, along with others pointing to various coverage of the event. It had been covered live by CNN, NBC News, CBS News, MSNBC, and ABC News Radio.

Fox News' vice president of marketing, Michael Tammaro, attempted to explain the ad by stating: "Generally speaking, it's fair to say that from the tea party movement ... to ACORN ... to the march on 9/12, the networks either ignored the story, marginalized it or misrepresented the significance of it altogether."

== Obama administration conflict with Fox News ==
In September 2009, the Obama administration engaged in a verbal conflict with Fox News. On September 20, President Obama appeared on all the major news networks except Fox News, a snub partially in response to remarks about the president by commentators Glenn Beck and Sean Hannity and general coverage by Fox News with regard to Obama's health care proposal. Fox News Sunday host Chris Wallace called White House administration officials "crybabies" in response. Following this, a senior Obama adviser told U.S. News that the White House would never get a fair shake from Fox News.

In late September 2009, Obama senior advisor David Axelrod and Fox News founder Roger Ailes met in secret to try to ease tensions between the two camps without much success. Two weeks later, White House officials referred to Fox as "not a news network". Communications director Anita Dunn claimed that, "Fox News often operates as either the research arm or the communications arm of the Republican Party." President Obama followed with, "If media is operating basically as a talk radio format, then that's one thing, and if it's operating as a news outlet, then that's another," and then-White House chief of staff Rahm Emanuel stated that it was important "to not have the CNNs and the others in the world basically be led in following FNC."

Within days it was reported that Fox News had been excluded from an interview with administration official Ken Feinberg, with bureau chiefs from the White House press pool (ABC, CBS, NBC, and CNN) coming to the defense of Fox News. One of the major bureau chiefs stated, "If any member had been excluded it would have been the same thing, it has nothing to do with Fox or the White House or the substance of the issues." Shortly after this story broke the White House admitted to a low-level mistake, but said that Fox News had not made a specific request to interview Feinberg. Then-Fox News White House correspondent Major Garrett responded by stating that he had not made a specific request, but that he had a "standing request from me as senior White House correspondent on Fox to interview any newsmaker at the Treasury at any given time news is being made."

On November 8, 2009, the Los Angeles Times reported that an unnamed Democratic consultant was warned by the White House not to appear on Fox News again. According to the article, Anita Dunn claimed in an e-mail to have checked with colleagues who "deal with TV issues" and had been told that nobody had been instructed to avoid Fox News (for 24-hour news) except for the Fox Broadcasting Company (for special report coverage). Patrick Caddell, a Fox News contributor and former pollster for Jimmy Carter, said he had spoken with other Democratic consultants who had received similar warnings from the White House.

== Video footage manipulation ==
Jon Stewart reported on his November 11, 2009, broadcast of The Daily Show that Fox News host Sean Hannity misrepresented video footage purportedly showing large crowds on a health care protest orchestrated by Rep. Michele Bachmann. Stewart showed inconsistencies in alternating shots according to the color of the sky and tree leaves, showing that footage from Glenn Beck's much larger 9/12 rally, which had occurred two months earlier, had been spliced in with the other shots. Hannity estimated 20,000 protesters were in attendance, the Washington Post estimated 10,000, and Luke Russert reported that three Capitol Hill police officers guessed "about 4,000". Sean Hannity apologized to his viewers for the error during his November 11, 2009, broadcast. Stewart periodically accused Fox News of playing video footage out of context, such as when Hannity played footage of Obama stating the DREAM Act could not be passed by executive order, to make the president seem hypocritical although when the footage is continued Obama goes on to clarify that he does have the authority to halt deportations.

On November 18, 2009, Happening Now anchor Gregg Jarrett told viewers that a Sarah Palin book signing in Grand Rapids, Michigan, had a massive turnout while showing footage of Palin with a large crowd. Jarrett noted that the former Republican vice-presidential candidate is "continuing to draw huge crowds while she's promoting her brand-new book", adding that the images being shown were "some of the pictures just coming in to us ... The lines earlier had formed this morning." The video was actually taken from a 2008 McCain-Palin campaign rally. Fox News senior vice-president of news Michael Clemente issued an initial statement saying, "This was a production error in which the copy editor changed a script and didn't alert the control room to update the video." Fox offered an on-air apology the following day during the same Happening Now segment, citing regrets for what they described as a "video error" with no intent to mislead.

On November 12, 2021, Fox News edited a video of President Joe Biden to remove context from remarks that some could judge as racially insensitive, which was shown on Fox & Friends. In his comments, Biden said he had "adopted the attitude of the great Negro, at the time pitcher in the Negro Leagues, went on to become a great pitcher in the pros in Major League baseball after Jackie Robinson, his name was Satchel Paige." The video was edited so Biden was heard saying he had "adopted the attitude of the great Negro at the time, pitcher, name was Satchel Paige."

== ISIL video ==
After Royal Jordanian Air Force pilot Muath al-Kasasbeh was burned to death by ISIL in February 2015, Fox News included the full ISIL video on its website. The network said it had chosen to do so, after careful consideration, in order that readers of their website could "see for themselves the barbarity of ISIS." Malcolm Nance, executive director of the think tank Terror Asymmetrics Project on Strategy, Tactics and Radical Ideology (TAPSTRI), said that Fox News was "literally — literally — working for al-Qaida and ISIS's media arm ... They might as well start sending them royalty checks."

== Sexism ==
=== Sexual harassment allegations ===
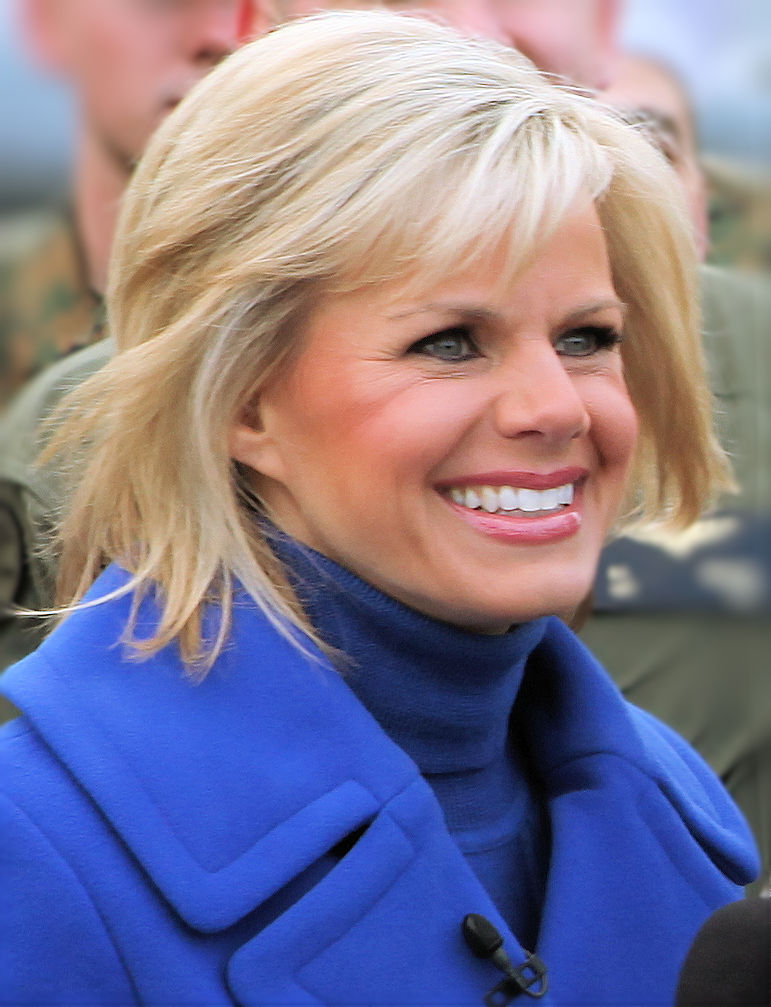
Gretchen Carlson in 2009

On July 6, 2016, former Fox & Friends co-host Gretchen Carlson filed a sexual harassment lawsuit against Roger Ailes in the Superior Court of New Jersey. In her complaint, Carlson alleged that she was fired from her program for refusing Ailes' sexual advances. After Carlson came forward, six more women spoke to Gabriel Sherman of New York magazine, alleging that Ailes had sexually harassed them and that Ailes had "spoke[n] openly of expecting women to perform sexual favors in exchange for job opportunities." New York reported that Megyn Kelly told investigators Ailes made "unwanted sexual advances toward her" at the start of her career. The magazine also reported that the Murdochs had given Ailes an ultimatum: resign by August 1 or be fired.

Facing overwhelming public criticism, Ailes resigned on July 21, 2016. On September 6, 21st Century Fox (then-parent company of 20th Century Fox, Fox Searchlight Pictures, 20th Century Fox Television, 20th Century Fox Home Entertainment, the Fox network, FX Networks, Fox News and Fox Sports) announced that it had settled the lawsuit with Carlson. The settlement was reportedly $20 million. As part of the settlement, 21st Century Fox apologized to Carlson, saying "We sincerely regret and apologize for the fact that Gretchen was not treated with the respect and dignity that she and all of our colleagues deserve."

In August 2016, Andrea Tantaros, who had been pulled from the network in April with reported "contract issues", claimed that she approached Fox News executives about inappropriate behavior towards her by Ailes in 2015. Tantaros said her allegations resulted first in her being demoted from The Five to Outnumbered, and then in her being taken off the air. Tantaros filed a lawsuit against Fox News for sexual harassment, also claiming that Bill O'Reilly, actor Dean Cain, and Scott Brown made inappropriate comments to her, and that Brown and Cain touched her without her consent.

In April 2017, The New York Times reported that O'Reilly and Fox News had settled five lawsuits against the former dating back to 2002, in addition to publicly acknowledged settlements to Andrea Mackris in 2004 and Juliet Huddy in 2017; the Times reported that Fox News hosts Rebecca Diamond and Laurie Dhue settled sexual harassment lawsuits in 2011 and 2016 respectively, and junior producer Rachel Witlieb Bernstein settled with Fox News in 2002 after accusing O'Reilly of verbal abuse. The amount paid to the women filing the complaints was estimated at $13 million. The Times also reported a claim by former O'Reilly Factor guest Wendy Walsh, who declined an offer from O'Reilly to go to his hotel suite and was subsequently denied a job as a Fox News contributor. 21st Century Fox hired the law firm of Paul, Weiss, Rifkind, Wharton & Garrison to conduct an investigation into Walsh's allegation; that firm also conducted an investigation into the allegations against Ailes.

After the five settlements were reported, The O'Reilly Factor lost more than half its advertisers within a week; almost sixty companies withdrew their television advertising from the show amid a growing backlash against O'Reilly. On April 11, 2017, O'Reilly announced he would take a two-week vacation and return to the program on April 24. However, on April 19, it was reported that O'Reilly would not return to the network. Co-president Bill Shine, who had been accused of covering up sexual harassment allegations, resigned on May 1.

In July 2017, Fox Business Network suspended Charles Payne pending an investigation after a former network guest, Scottie Nell Hughes, accused him of sexual harassment. Payne denied the harassment charge but acknowledged having had a three-year-long "romantic relationship" with Hughes before the accusation was made. Hughes, who kept an apartment near 21st Century Fox's Manhattan headquarters for the duration of the affair, claimed she believed it would help her obtain a permanent position at the network. Hughes' appearances were drastically reduced after she ended the affair in 2015 and reported Payne to Fox News.

In August 2017, The Huffington Post reported that Eric Bolling sent lewd text messages to two women at Fox News and one at Fox Business. He was suspended pending investigation. Caroline Heldman, a former Fox News guest, alleged that Bolling made numerous unwanted sexual advances towards her. Bolling was suspended and eventually left the network, moving to a syndicated show produced by Sinclair Broadcast Group.

=== Women's health care ===
In 2013, Fox & Friends featured a segment in which contributor Dr. David B. Samadi made an appearance to discuss the cost of women's health care. On the program, Samadi argued that insurance costs more for women due to their more frequent use of health services, as opposed to men: "I just think that the whole system is not working well. I mean this is one of the examples, where men and women are totally different, there is a sex difference when it comes to the health care use, but I really think that if you pay for it, you are going to negotiate, finding out where is the best doctor, where you're going to get a better deal on all these X-rays, etc., that's how you're gonna save money." Following this segment, Fox News received criticism from several online outlets.

== Seth Rich ==
On May 15, 2017, Fox 5 DC (WTTG) reported the uncorroborated and later largely retracted claims by Rod Wheeler, a Fox News contributor and former homicide detective, that there was evidence Seth Rich had contacted WikiLeaks and that law enforcement were covering this up, claims that were never independently verified by Fox. The next day, Fox News published a lead story on its website and provided extensive coverage on its cable news channel about what it later said were Wheeler's uncorroborated claims about the murder of Seth Rich; in the lead story Fox News removed from their website a few days later, they stated that Wheeler's claims had been "corroborated by a federal investigator who spoke to Fox News." In reporting these claims, the Fox News report re-ignited conspiracy theories about the killing. According to NPR, within a day of the original Fox report, "Google searches for Rich had overtaken searches for James Comey, even amid continuous news about the former FBI director's conversations with Trump." The Washington Post's Callum Borchers noted Fox News chose to lead with this story at a time when most other media outlets were covering Donald Trump's disclosure of classified information to Russia.

Other news organizations revealed Wheeler was a Donald Trump supporter, a paid Fox News contributor, and according to NBC News had "developed a reputation for making outlandish claims, such as one appearance on Fox News in 2007 in which he warned that underground networks of pink pistol-toting lesbian gangs were raping young women". The Washington Post noted it is "rare for a news organization to have such a close relationship with the people it is covering", as Wheeler was "playing three roles at once: as a Fox source, as a paid contributor to the network and as a supposedly independent investigator of the murder". When Wheeler appeared on Sean Hannity's Fox News shows, these multiple roles were not disclosed to viewers. After Wheeler's Fox News interview on May 15, 2017, Brad Bauman, a communications professional and spokesman for the Rich family, said the family was asking Fox News and the Fox affiliate to retract their reports and apologize for damaging their son's legacy.

The family spokesperson, the Washington, D.C., police department, the Washington, D.C., mayor's office, the FBI, and law enforcement sources familiar with the case all disputed Wheeler's claims. The family said, "We are a family who is committed to facts, not fake evidence that surfaces every few months to fill the void and distract law enforcement and the general public from finding Seth's murderers." Bauman criticized Fox News for its reporting, saying he believed that the outlet was motivated by a desire to deflect attention from the Trump-Russia story: "I think there's a very special place in hell for people that would use the memory of a murder victim in order to pursue a political agenda."

Later that day, Wheeler told CNN he had no evidence that Rich had contacted Wikileaks. Wheeler claimed that Fox had presented his quotes misleadingly and that he only learned about the possible existence of the evidence from a Fox News reporter. Despite this, Sean Hannity's show and Fox & Friends continued to promote the conspiracy theory for the remainder of the week. On May 18, 2016, Hannity's guest on the show was Jay Sekulow who said that Rich's killing "... undercuts this whole Russia argument;" neither one mentioned that Sekulow had just been hired as one of Trump's lead lawyers in the Mueller investigation into Russian interference in the 2016 United States elections. Former House Speaker Newt Gingrich and Geraldo Rivera took part in spreading the conspiracy. Hannity had on his program Tom Fitton of Judicial Watch, who said the organization filed Freedom of Information Act requests for documents from Washington, D.C., mayor Muriel E. Bowser, and from the Metropolitan Police. Sean Hannity furthermore promoted the uncorroborated claims of Kim Dotcom, a New Zealand resident sought by the United States on fraud charges who claimed without evidence that Rich had been in contact with him before his death. Fox News host Julie Roginsky was critical of the conspiracy theory peddlers, stating on Twitter and on her television show: "The exploitation of a dead man whose family has begged conspiracy theorists to stop is really egregious. Please stop." Fox News was also criticized by conservative outlets, such as the Weekly Standard, National Review, and conservative columnists, such as Jennifer Rubin, Michael Gerson, and John Podhoretz. In September 2017, NPR noted that Fox News had yet to apologize for its false story or explain what went wrong; "When a story of this scale crumbles, most news organizations feel obligated to explain what happened and why. Not so far at Fox."

By November 2020, Malia Zimmerman, the reporter behind the retracted Fox News story, was no longer working at Fox.

== Sean Hannity and Michael Cohen ==
On April 9, 2018, federal agents from the U.S. Attorney's Office for the Southern District of New York (SDNY) served a search warrant on the office and residence of Michael Cohen, President Trump's personal attorney. On the air, Hannity defended Cohen and criticized the federal action, calling it "highly questionable" and "an unprecedented abuse of power".

On April 16, Cohen's lawyers told a federal judge that Cohen had ten clients in 2017–2018 but did "traditional legal tasks" for only three clients: Donald Trump, Elliott Broidy and an undisclosed third client, who they later revealed to be Sean Hannity. Although Hannity has covered Cohen on his show, he did not disclose that he had consulted with Cohen.

Fox News released a statement on April 16, 2018, attributed to Hannity: "Michael Cohen has never represented me in any matter. I never retained him, received an invoice, or paid legal fees. I have occasionally had brief discussions with him about legal questions about which I wanted his input and perspective. I assumed those conversations were confidential, but to be absolutely clear they never involved any matter between me and a third party." NBC News quoted Hannity as saying: "We definitely had attorney–client privilege because I asked him for that", while Hannity said on his radio show that he "might have handed him ten bucks" for the attorney–client privilege. Lastly, Hannity tweeted that his discussions with Cohen were "almost exclusively" about real estate.

The following day, news reports revealed that Hannity had shared another lawyer with Trump: Jay Sekulow. Sekulow had written a cease-and-desist letter to KFAQ on Hannity's behalf in May 2017, and later represented Trump in connection with the Mueller investigation.

== Coverage of the Stoneman Douglas High School shooting ==
Fox News' coverage of the Stoneman Douglas High School shooting, which killed 14 students and three staff members, and injuring 17 others, has been criticized by the survivors of the shooting.

On February 27, 2018, hosts Tucker Carlson and Sean Hannity issued an apology to viewers after it had run segments detailing false claims that CNN scripted a February 21 town hall meeting event featuring the survivors of the shooting. The claims came just six days after Colton Haab, who was one of the students that was credited with saving his classmates, went on both Carlson and Hannity's shows and falsely claimed that CNN tried to give him a scripted question that he refused to use because he wanted to use his own, sparking a backlash against CNN over staging the event for ratings and getting a tweet from President Donald Trump slamming the network. But on February 26, Glenn Haab, Colton's father, admitted that he was responsible for the fabrication of the story by doctoring the emails to make it look like it was set up by CNN, thus confirming the network's claim that it never used any form of scripted material for the event.

On March 29, 2018, The Ingraham Angle host Laura Ingraham issued an apology to her viewers after comments she made about David Hogg, one of the survivors of the shooting after he spoke out for advocating gun control laws during the March 24 "March for Our Lives" rally, claiming that he was being turned down by universities after reading a tweet from a conservative website that falsely branded Hogg as a "Gun Rights Provocateur" (her tweet read "David Hogg Rejected By Four Colleges To Which He Applied and whines about it..." "Dinged by UCLA with a 4.1 GPA...totally predictable given acceptance rates."). Hogg, however, did not accept Ingraham's apology and called for a boycott of her program, a move that has resulted in around 15 companies (including TripAdvisor, Nestlé, Expedia, and Wayfair) pulling advertising from the show due to its conservative rhetoric. Hogg, who listed the companies that advertises on her program in the hope to remove their spots from the show, tweeted that he will only accept the apology "if you denounce the way your network has treated my friends and I in this fight."

== Coverage of the COVID-19 pandemic ==
Fox News' coverage of the COVID-19 pandemic has been criticized due to pundits and guests having initially dismissed the severity of the disease's transmission in the United States (following the lead of the Trump administration), accused critics of exaggerating its impact to attack President Trump, and perpetuating COVID-19 misinformation about how to mitigate or treat the virus.

Tucker Carlson promoted the COVID-19 lab leak theory and in a February 24 commentary argued that "wokeness" and diversity had eased its spread. At the same time, Carlson did become more critical of the Trump administration's response on occasion, opining on March 9 that "people you trust—people you probably voted for—have spent weeks minimizing what is clearly a very serious problem." Media Matters for America criticized Carlson in particular, as well as other Fox News personalities, for using Sinophobic language such as "Chinese coronavirus", "Wuhan virus", "kung flu", or variations thereof to refer to COVID-19 on-air.

Sean Hannity argued on his March 9 program that Democrats and the news media were trying to use COVID-19 to "bludgeon Trump". On March 5, Trump made an appearance on the program by phone, where he claimed that a projected mortality rate of 3.4% announced earlier that day by the World Health Organization was a "false number" and predicted that it would actually be under 1%. On his March 10 episode (one day before the WHO declared a pandemic), Hannity argued that the seasonal flu was still making a larger "impact" than COVID-19 (with 34 million cases against roughly 1,200 at the time), only the elderly and immunocompromised were at the greatest risk, and argued that there was not an equivalent "widespread hysteria" over routine violent crimes in Chicago.

Also on March 10, Laura Ingraham referred to "panic pushers" in the media, suggesting that "the facts are actually pretty reassuring, but you'd never know it watching all this stuff", and implicated that only those at high risk needed to practice social distancing (contrasting recommendations by officials that all people should practice social distancing). Two days later, Fox & Friends co-host Ainsley Earhardt suggested that it was the "safest time to fly" since "[the] terminals are pretty much dead", and the program aired an interview with Liberty University president Jerry Falwell Jr., where he claimed that the "overreaction" to COVID-19 was "their next attempt to get Trump" and that COVID-19 was a biological weapon developed by China or North Korea to attack the United States.

Concurrent with Trump's own changes in tone and attitude surrounding the pandemic, some Fox News pundits began to openly acknowledge its severity on-air, including Hannity, Ingraham, and Earhardt. Vanity Fair observed this shift in tone as an inversion of the "feedback loop" that had emerged between Trump and Fox News (resulting from Trump's discussion of stories seen on the network, particularly during Fox & Friends, on social media), but noted that the network's personalities were more often "showering praise on the president rather than offering their own take on things", and that Ingraham had accused other media outlets of using the pandemic to celebrate "Trump's downfall".

On March 24, after Trump began to endorse off-label use of hydroxychloroquine as a treatment for COVID-19 symptoms based on anecdotal evidence, Hannity and Ingraham similarly promoted the drug during their respective programs. During a Coronavirus Task Force briefing on April 13, 2020, Trump screened a montage of footage taken directly from an episode of Hannity, of news anchors and guests downplaying the early threat of COVID-19, as part of a video presentation that glorified his initial response to the pandemic.

Fox News faced criticism for featuring celebrity doctors such as Phil McGraw and Mehmet Oz as guests, with both of them downplaying the impact that a premature lifting of mitigation measures and "reopening" of the country (as was being proposed by Trump) would have. Fox News also faced backlash for providing undue praise of protests against stay-at-home orders in multiple states (such as Lansing, Michigan's "Operation Gridlock"), including interviews with participants and organizers, and pundits praising the event and making comments critical of Governor Gretchen Whitmer (such as Carlson calling her actions "mindless and authoritarian", and Fox & Friends co-host Brian Kilmeade predicting a larger movement against "ridiculous" stay-at-home orders). Trump made posts on Twitter in support of the protests on April 17, reading "LIBERATE MICHIGAN", "LIBERATE VIRGINIA" and "LIBERATE MINNESOTA" respectively; the timing of the tweets corresponded with a segment on America's Newsroom that had covered them.

Fox News pundits showed inconsistent views towards the wearing of face masks to lessen spread of infected droplets by the wearer. Hannity and Fox & Friends host Steve Doocy have supported the practice, as did Carlson and Ingraham in late-March; on his March 30 episode, Carlson stated that "Of course masks work. Everyone knows that. Dozens of research papers have proved it", and cited that they were "key" to controlling the pandemic in East Asia, and criticized the government's early guidance against using them for protection of the wearer. However, as masks became a partisan political issue over the months that followed, Carlson and Ingraham began to perpetuate opposition towards the practice, on a later episode, Carlson claimed that masking and social distancing had no basis in science. On April 26, 2021, Carlson claimed that making children wear masks was child abuse, and that people who spot parents making their children wear masks should call police and child protective services.

Despite having made some efforts to promote the vaccination program, via public service announcements, promotion of the federal Vaccines.gov website, and selected hosts making statements in support of vaccination, Media Matters for America found that from June 28 to August 8, at least 60% of Fox News segments discussing COVID-19 vaccines "included claims undermining or downplaying [them]", such as political arguments, disputes and conspiracy theories regarding their safety, and arguments that they were a "cynical political ploy by Democrats". The amount of such content was shown to have intensified during the week of July 26, while Tucker Carlson, Brian Kilmeade, and frequent guest Marty Makary were identified as having discussed such content most often during the period. Fox News implemented a vaccine passport system in July 2021 despite its hosts criticizing vaccine passports, and more than 90% of Fox Corporation's full-time employees had been fully vaccinated by September 2021.

Other Fox News Media properties have also faced criticism and controversies over their coverage of the pandemic. In March 2020, Fox Business anchor Trish Regan left the network amid criticism of a March 7 segment on her program, where she accused Democrats of politicizing the pandemic so they could blame Donald Trump for it, and seek a second impeachment. One month later, Fox Nation severed its ties with conservative vloggers Diamond and Silk after they repeatedly promoted various COVID-19 conspiracy theories. On December 23, 2020, Fox Business program Mornings with Maria was duped by the animal rights group Direct Action Everywhere, airing an interview with an activist posing as Smithfield Foods' CEO Dennis Organ to discuss its response to the pandemic. He suggested that "the conditions inside of our farms can sometimes be petri dishes for new diseases", and that the meat packing industry could "effectively [bring] on the next pandemic." The program's anchor Maria Bartiromo issued an apology at the end of the show, saying that they had been "punked".

=== Reactions ===
An academic study conducted by economists at the University of Chicago, Harvard University, and other institutions, found a correlation between viewership of Hannity and a greater number of COVID-19 cases and deaths, relative to viewership of Tucker Carlson Tonight on the same channel.

Fox fired Regan, who had claimed that the concern over coronavirus was "another attempt to impeach the president" on her show on March 9; her last appearance was on March 13.

In April 2020, the Washington League for Increased Transparency and Ethics (WASHLITE) sued Fox News under the state's Consumer Protection Act for allegedly "falsely and deceptively disseminating 'news'" that coronavirus was "not a danger to public health and safety." In response, Fox News maintained that its "political commentary" amounts to "constitutionally protected opinions" and that hosts Sean Hannity and Trish Regan participated in an "intense public debate" over the predicted severity of the threat. On May 27, King County Superior Court Judge Brian McDonald decided Fox News was within their First Amendment rights. Washlite appealed the case, and on August 30, 2021, the appeal was rejected on the grounds that the First Amendment to the United States Constitution bars WASHLITE's action.

A November 2021 survey from the Kaiser Family Foundation found that 36% of Fox News viewers believed or were unsure about four or more false claims about the pandemic, while 52% believed or were unsure of 1 to 3 false claims. The false claims checked in the survey included the idea that the COVID-19 vaccines cause infertility and that the government is exaggerating the number of deaths due to COVID-19.

== False claims about the 2020 election ==
After Trump's defeat in the 2020 presidential election, Fox News promoted baseless allegations that voting machine company Smartmatic and Dominion Voting Systems had conspired to rig the election for Joe Biden. Hosts Jeanine Pirro, Lou Dobbs and Maria Bartiromo promoted the allegations on their programs on sister network Fox Business. In December 2020, Smartmatic sent a letter to Fox News demanding retractions and threatening legal action. However, Pirro, Dobbs, and Bartiromo refused to issue retractions as they played a three-minute video segment consisting of an interview with an election technology expert who refuted the allegations promoted by the hosts, responding to questions from an unseen and unidentified man.

Two lawsuits resulted:

- In February 2021, Smartmatic filed a $2.7 billion defamation suit against the network and the three hosts.
- On March 26, 2021, Dominion filed a $1.6 billion defamation suit against the network.

Fox News did not simulcast the 2022 public hearings of the January 6 committee although competitor channels aired it. For the duration of the first hearing, Fox News simulcast it with no audio and cut footage.

In April 2023, Fox News announced that it had settled with Venezuelan businessman Majed Khalil, whom former Fox News host Lou Dobbs had accused of helping rig the 2020 presidential elections against Donald Trump. Khalil's lawsuit was separate from the ongoing lawsuits with Smartmatic and Dominion.

=== Dominion defamation lawsuit against Fox Corporation ===
On March 26, 2021, Dominion Voting Systems filed a $1.6 billion defamation suit against Fox News.

On May 18, 2021, Fox News filed a motion to dismiss the Dominion Voting Systems lawsuit, asserting a First Amendment right "to inform the public about newsworthy allegations of paramount public concern." A Dominion lawyer said that a dismissal of the lawsuit would give Fox News a "blank check" to lie. On November 8, 2021, Dominion sued its parent companies, Fox Corporation and Fox Broadcasting, for defamation and for failing to preserve documents relating to the role Murdoch played in spreading false claims about Dominion. On February 16, 2023, Dominion filed a motion for summary judgment, citing dozens of internal communications sent during the months after the 2020 presidential election.

On April 18, 2023, Fox and Dominion settled for $787.5 million.

==== Evidence ====
Dominion showed evidence indicating that privately the Fox hosts did not believe the election fraud lies they pushed publicly. Several prominent network hosts and senior executives—including chairman Rupert Murdoch and CEO Suzanne Scott—discussed their knowledge that the allegations of election fraud they were reporting were false. The communications showed their concerns that if they did not continue to report these falsehoods, viewers would be alienated and switch to rival conservative networks like Newsmax and OANN, impacting corporate profitability.

Internal texts and other products of discovery against Fox revealed that Tucker Carlson privately doubted the false claims that the 2020 election was stolen and mocked Trump advisors, including Rudy Giuliani and Sidney Powell. Carlson texted to Laura Ingraham, "Sidney Powell is lying by the way. I caught her. It's insane" and "Our viewers are good people and they believe it." Furthermore, Carlson texted to Sean Hannity, saying fellow Fox reporter Jacqui Heinrich should be fired for fact-checking false claims Carlson and Trump circulated about Dominion. He wrote "Please get her fired. Seriously.... What the fuck? I'm actually shocked... It needs to stop immediately, like tonight. It's measurably hurting the company. The stock price is down. Not a joke.", and said he "just went crazy on" a Fox executive over Heinrich's reporting.

Rupert Murdoch privately messaged that Trump's voter fraud claims were "really crazy stuff", telling Fox News CEO Suzanne Scott that it was "terrible stuff damaging everybody, I fear". As a January 2021 Georgia runoff election approached that would determine party control of the U.S. Senate, Murdoch told Scott, "Trump will concede eventually and we should concentrate on Georgia, helping any way we can." When Murdoch was deposed, he acknowledged that some Fox News commentators were endorsing election fraud claims they knew were false.

=== Smartmatic defamation lawsuit against Fox Corporation ===
In February 2021, Smartmatic USA Corporation launched a defamation lawsuit against Fox Corporation, claiming $2.7 billion in damage as a result of the coverage of Donald Trump's false claim that the 2020 US Presidential election was stolen. Fox motioned to dismiss, but in March 2023, the New York state Supreme Court denied the motion. A lawyer for Smartmatic said the company would not accept a financial settlement smaller than Dominion's, and furthermore they demanded that Fox make a "full retraction" of its election lies. On January 9, 2025, a court ruled that Smartmatic's lawsuit could proceed.

=== Ray Epps conspiracy theory ===
In July 2023, Ray Epps started legal proceedings against Fox News, following former host Tucker Carlson sharing incorrect allegations that Epps was an agent provocateur during the January 6 United States Capitol attack.

=== New York City Pension Funds lawsuit against Fox Corporation ===
In September 2023, New York City pension funds filed a lawsuit against Fox Corporation alleging negligence for knowingly opening itself up to defamation lawsuits. At the time, New York City pension funds held 857,000 shares of Fox stock worth $28.1 million. The state of Oregon joined the lawsuit on behalf of the Oregon Public Employee Retirement fund which at the time held 225,000 shares worth $5.2 million.

=== Hunter Biden lawsuit ===
On July 1, 2024, Hunter Biden sued Fox News. He alleges "revenge porn" due to them sharing nude photos of him on air, without his permission. The lawsuit "alleges Fox violated New York state's so-called revenge porn law, which makes it illegal to publish intimate images of a person without their consent. He is also suing for unjust enrichment and intentional infliction of emotional distress."

The lawsuit also addresses a program that Fox had aired in October 2022, called "The Trial of Hunter Biden: A Mock Trial for the American People." After Biden had threatened a lawsuit in 2022, Fox took down the program. According to the lawsuit, the news corporation still promotes the since removed program with clips and reels. Fox News called the lawsuit "politically motivated" and "devoid of merit." Biden dropped the lawsuit on July 22.

== Human rights violations ==
In mid-2021, Fox News agreed to pay a $1 million settlement to New York City after its Commission on Human Rights cited "a pattern of violating the NYC Human Rights Law". A Fox News spokesperson claimed that "FOX News Media has already been in full compliance across the board, but [settled] to continue enacting extensive preventive measures against all forms of discrimination and harassment."

== Criticism of pundits ==
=== Notable pundits ===
- Glenn Beck, the host of an eponymous afternoon commentary show, stated in 2009 that he believed President Obama is "a racist" and has "a deep-seated hatred for white people or the white culture." These remarks drew criticism, and resulted in a boycott promulgated by Color of Change. The boycott resulted in eighty advertisers requesting their ads be removed from his programming to avoid associating their brands with content that could be considered offensive by potential customers. Beck later apologized for the remarks, stating on Fox News Sunday that he has a "big fat mouth" and miscast as racism what is actually, as he theorizes, Obama's belief in black theology. Beck left Fox News in June 2011 after twenty-nine months with the network.
- Neil Cavuto, who is also Fox News' vice president of business news and a current member of the network's executive committee, was described as a "Bush apologist" by critics after conducting an allegedly deferential interview with President George W. Bush. Democratic strategists and politicians boycotted Cavuto's show in 2004 after he claimed, on air, that al-Qaeda leader Osama bin Laden was rooting for Bush's campaign opponent, Senator John Kerry. Cavuto has also received criticism for gratuitous footage and photos of scantily clad supermodels and adult film stars on his program.
- Alan Colmes, who from 1996 to 2009 was co-host of the political debate program Hannity & Colmes, was touted by Fox News as "a hard-hitting liberal" who was used to counter the opinions of his co-host, conservative talk radio personality Sean Hannity. However, while speaking to USA Today, Colmes described himself as "quite moderate". He was characterized by several newspapers as being Hannity's "sidekick". Liberal commentator and future Minnesota Senator Al Franken lambasted Colmes in his book, Lies and the Lying Liars Who Tell Them. Throughout the book, Colmes' name is printed in smaller type than all other words to emphasize Franken's belief that Colmes' role was to feebly defend liberal positions, allowing him to be bulldozed by Hannity. Franken accuses Colmes of refusing to ask tough questions during debates and neglecting to challenge erroneous claims made by Hannity or his guests.
- John Gibson, the former host of an afternoon program called The Big Story, was cited as an example of Fox News blurring the lines between objective reporting and opinion programming. Gibson caused a general uproar among listeners immediately after the 2000 presidential election controversy when, during the opinion segment of his show, Gibson asked: "Is this a case where knowing the facts actually would be worse than not knowing? I mean, should we burn these ballots, preserve them in amber, or shred them?" and, "George Bush is going to be president. And who needs to know that he's not a legitimate president?" In an opinion piece on the Hutton Inquiry decision, Gibson said the BBC had "a frothing-at-the-mouth anti-Americanism that was obsessive, irrational and dishonest" and that the BBC reporter, Andrew Gilligan, "insisted on air that the Iraqi Army was heroically repulsing an incompetent American military." In reviewing viewer complaints, Ofcom (the United Kingdom's statutory broadcasting regulator) ruled that Fox News had breached the program code in three areas: "respect for truth", "opportunity to take part", and "personal opinions expressed (in an opinion slot) must not rest upon false evidence." Fox News admitted that Gilligan had not actually said the words that Gibson appeared to attribute to him; Ofcom rejected the claim that it was intended to be a paraphrase. Gibson also called Joe Wilson a "liar", claimed that "the far left" is working for al-Qaeda and stated that he wished that Paris had been host to the 2012 Olympic Games, because it would have subjected the city to the threat of terrorism instead of London.
- Steven Milloy, a commentator for FoxNews.com, has been critical of the science behind global warming and secondhand smoke as a carcinogen. In a February 6, 2006, article in The New Republic, Paul D. Thacker revealed that ExxonMobil had donated $90,000 to two non-profit organizations run out of Milloy's house. In addition, Milloy received almost $100,000 a year from Philip Morris USA during the time he was arguing that secondhand smoke was not carcinogenic. Milloy's website, junkscience.com, was reviewed and revised by a public relations firm hired by RJR Tobacco. In response to Thacker's disclosure of this conflict of interest, Paul Schur, director of media relations for Fox News, stated that "... Fox News was unaware of Milloy's connection with Philip Morris. Any affiliation he had should have been disclosed."
- E. D. Hill introduced an upcoming discussion before a commercial break about a fist bump between Barack and Michelle Obama after the 2008 Democratic primaries by stating that the gesture was either "A fist bump? A pound? [or] A terrorist fist jab?", but never explained the term when the segment continued after the break. The incident was considered controversial among bloggers and political commentators. Hill apologized for her comments the next day.
- Dick Morris appeared several times on Fox News, including one appearance on Fox & Friends two days before the 2012 presidential election, predicting that Mitt Romney would win the election in a landslide. Morris was the least accurate major pundit in predicting the 2012 election. After the election, Morris did not appear on Fox News for almost three months. Finally on February 5, 2013, Fox News announced that it would not renew Morris' contract.
- Karl Rove protested Fox News' calling of the 2012 election for Barack Obama on November 7, 2012. Megyn Kelly then brought a camera crew to ask the off-air analysts team if they stood by their decision. After Rove continued to refuse Fox News's decision, Kelly responded by asking him, "Is this just math that you do as a Republican to make yourself feel better? Or is this real?"
- Megyn Kelly drew controversy after making remarks in December 2013 reacting to a Slate article that postulated that "Santa Claus should not be a white man anymore". On her Fox News program, The Kelly File, Kelly quipped that, "For all you kids watching at home, Santa just is white, but this person is just arguing that maybe we should also have a black Santa," adding, "But Santa is what he is, and just so you know, we're just debating this because someone wrote about it." Kelly also stated that Jesus was white later in the segment. Soon after, Jon Stewart, Stephen Colbert, Rachel Maddow, and others satirized her remarks. A few days later, Kelly made additional on-air statements and characterized her original comments as "tongue-in-cheek".

=== Discredited military and counterterrorism editor ===
- The New York Times ran an article entitled, "At Fox News, the Colonel Who Wasn't" by Jim Rutenberg, revealing that Joseph A. Cafasso, whom Fox had employed for four months as a Military and Counterterrorism Editor, had bogus military credentials.

== Other criticisms ==
=== Criticism of media coverage ===
- Outfoxed, a documentary film on Fox News by activist Robert Greenwald, made assertions of bias in Fox News by interviewing a number of former employees who discuss the network's practices. For example, Frank O'Donnell, identified as a Fox News producer, says: "We were stunned, because up until that point, we were allowed to do legitimate news. Suddenly, we were ordered from the top to carry ... Republican, right-wing propaganda[,]" including being told what to say about Ronald Reagan. The network made an official response and claimed that four of the individuals identified as employees of Fox News either were not employees (O'Donnell, e.g., worked for an affiliate over which Fox News claims to have no editorial authority) or had their titles inflated.
- Fox Attacks was a 2007–08 viral video campaign designed to expose Fox News' alleged right-wing bias. It was produced by Greenwald and Brave New Films after the production of Outfoxed. Greenwald continued his anti-Fox campaign with more than twenty-five short videos on YouTube concerning Fox News' negative treatment of Barack Obama during the 2008 election cycle. As part of the Fox Attacks campaign, Brave New Films also released "open letters" to other media outlets, and circulated anti-Fox petitions which garnered hundreds of thousands of signatures.
- CNN founder Ted Turner accused Fox News of being "dumbed down" and "propaganda" and equated the network's popularity to Adolf Hitler's rise to power in Nazi Germany during a speech to the National Association of Television Program Executives. In response, a Fox News spokesperson said, "Ted is understandably bitter having lost his ratings, his network, and now his mind. We wish him well." The Anti-Defamation League, to whom Turner had apologized in the past for a similar comparison, said Turner is "a recidivist who hasn't learned from his past mistakes."
- Fox News, while covering a car chase, inadvertently broadcast the suspect shooting himself and quickly apologized as being a mistake. Al Tompkins of the Poynter Institute, stipulated by e-mail; "There is simply no excuse for this. It is sensationalism to carry it in the first place."
- Fox News apologized for fabricated quotes attributed to John Kerry in an article on its website during the 2004 presidential campaign, stating that the piece was a joke which accidentally appeared on the website.
- Fox News aired a segment celebrating a 14-year-old transgender boy in California. Several conservative commentators criticized Fox News for airing the segment.
- California Governor Gavin Newsom accused Fox News for "creating a culture" that leads to violence against politicians, due to comments made by Jesse Watters on his show Jesse Watters Primetime, regarding the attack on Paul Pelosi, husband of House Speaker Nancy Pelosi.

=== Criticism of individuals ===
- Media Matters for America, which has since announced a campaign of "guerrilla warfare and sabotage" against Fox News, contends that the network specializes in "political sabotage" by putting up moderate-to-conservative "Democrats" as token liberals against more staunchly conservative Republicans. It cites the following people as examples of this:
  - Pat Caddell – called the Democratic Party a "confederacy of gangsters" and defended conservative writer Ann Coulter when she said she could not talk about former senator and presidential candidate John Edwards if she could not use the word "faggot".
  - Susan Estrich – known for her support for the defunct Democratic Leadership Council and once told Sean Hannity that she was his "biggest liberal friend".
- Another allegation of Fox's critics is that it sometimes ridicules protesters, especially ones for liberal causes. For example, during the 2004 Republican National Convention, Bill O'Reilly referred to some of the protesters as "terrorists" (though he added, "most protesters are peaceful"). Fox News online columnist Mike Straka referred to anti-war protesters at the September 24, 2005, march in Washington, D.C., as "jobless, anti-American, clueless, smelly, stupid traitors" and "protesters from hell".'

The Fox News report on Malmö was replayed on Swedish television, here on SVT1.

- Iranian-Swedish newspaper commentator, author and legal professional Behrang Kianzad wrote in the Expressen newspaper that "there are lies, damned lies and Fox News", in response to a Fox News story about allegedly Muslim violence in the city of Malmö. The report focused on the borough of Rosengård where two out of 1,000 school students were ethnic Swedes. Kianzad wrote that rock-throwing against police, firefighters and ambulance personnel happened not just in Rosengård and not as a Muslim custom. He also pointed out that the Fox News segment had false facts, namely that Malmö has about 7% immigrants from Muslim countries and not 25%. Furthermore, Kianzad pointed out the rhetoric used by Fox News to imply that Malmö had reached some sort of breaking point due to Muslim immigrants and that these immigrants were potential terrorists."
- In August 2006, two Jordanian-Arab freelancers who were working for Fox News as producers resigned from the network, citing its coverage that month of Israel's conflict with the militant group Hezbollah in Lebanon. Their resignation letter read in part: "We can no longer work with a news organization that claims to be fair and balanced when you are so far from that ... Not only are you Fox News an instrument of the Bush White House, and Israeli propaganda, you are warmongers with no sense of decency, nor professionalism."
- On January 19, 2007, a segment on Fox & Friends featured an anonymously sourced article in the conservative web magazine Insight that claimed that associates of Democratic Senator Hillary Clinton had discovered that Senator Barack Obama had attended a "Muslim seminary" as a child in Indonesia. The term "Muslim seminary" refers to a specifically religious form of madrassa (school). It was determined within days that Obama had instead, as he had said in his memoirs, attended first a Catholic and then a modern public elementary school. The latter was, as Obama had written, "predominantly Muslim" (as Indonesia is predominantly Muslim), and not a seminary of any kind. On January 31, 2007, The Washington Post suggested that because of Fox News' reporting of the Insight article, Obama had "frozen out" the network's reporters and producers while giving interviews to every other major network. After the incident, John Moody, a vice president at Fox, wrote to staff: "For the record: seeing an item on a website does not mean it is right. Nor does it mean it is ready for air on FNC. The urgent queue is our way of communicating information that is air-worthy. Please adhere to this."
- In March 2007, the Nevada Democratic Party pulled out of a planned debate to be hosted by Fox News. Its spokesmen cited a joke by Roger Ailes, which hinged on President George W. Bush confusing the names of Barack Obama and Osama bin Laden, as evidence that Fox News is biased against the party. Fox News chairman David Rhodes responded to the cancellation by saying that the Democratic Party is "owned by MoveOn.org" (which had created a petition against the debate).
- On May 25, 2008, Fox News political contributor Liz Trotta stated on the air, while talking about the presidential election, "And now we have what some are reading as a suggestion that somebody knock off Osama, uh Obama. Well, both, if we could"; she then laughed. She apologized for the remark on-air on Fox News the next day, saying, "I am so sorry about what happened yesterday and the lame attempt at humor." Trotta and Fox News were criticized for the remark by The New York Times editorial board and others.
- In June 2007, when Democratic Congressman William J. Jefferson of Louisiana was indicted on corruption, racketeering, and bribery charges, Fox News ran a video of Michigan Democratic Congressman John Conyers. Conyers criticized the network for "a history of inappropriate on-air mistakes" and the network's "lackluster on-air apology" (which did not name him), and a second, more specific apology was issued. In November 2006 Fox News had aired footage of then-Rep. Harold Ford, Jr. while talking about Senator Barack Obama.
- On September 5, 2011, Fox News criticized a speech by James P. Hoffa in Detroit calling for an "army of voters" to "take the SOBs out" and "give America back to Americans". However, Fox News edited out the mention of voters to make the speech sound like a call for violence.
- On January 11, 2015, Fox News commentator Steven Emerson, who had been criticized for inaccuracies in the past, reported that Birmingham, a city of over 1 million people in the United Kingdom, is a Muslim-only city: "In Britain, it's not just no-go zones, there are actual cities like Birmingham that are totally Muslim where non-Muslims just simply don't go in". UK Prime Minister David Cameron commented, "When I heard this, frankly, I choked on my porridge and I thought it must be April Fools' Day. This guy's clearly a complete idiot." Emerson, said to be an expert of Islamic terrorism, later apologized for what he called a "terrible", "inexcusable", "reckless" and "irresponsible" error, and made a donation of £500 to the Birmingham Children's Hospital.
- On November 2, 2022, Fox News commentator Jesse Watters mocked a Starbucks employee—who is a part of Starbucks Workers United—lamenting oppressive working conditions while calling for unionization, stating that "hard work" got him to his position. The video clip was edited, however, so that the employee appeared to just be complaining about an eight hour work day.
- In July 2023, James Ray Epps, a man who participated in the January 6 attack on the US Capitol, filed a defamation lawsuit against Fox News. Epps claims that Fox News falsely reported that he was an undercover FBI agent and responsible for the mob that broke into the Capitol.

== Fox News Channel responses to criticism ==
In June 2004, CEO Roger Ailes responded to some of the criticism with a rebuttal in an online Wall Street Journal editorial, saying that Fox News' critics intentionally confuse opinion shows such as The O'Reilly Factor with regular news coverage. Ailes stated that Fox News has broken stories harmful to Republicans, offering, "Fox News is the network that broke George W. Bush's DUI four days before the election" as an example, referring to Bush's DUI charge in 1976 that had not yet been made public. The DUI story was broken by then-Fox affiliate WPXT in Portland, Maine, although Fox News correspondent Carl Cameron also contributed to the report and, in the words of National Public Radio ombudsman Alicia Shepard, Fox News "sent the story ping-ponging around the nation" by broadcasting WPXT's coverage. WPXT News Director Kevin Kelly said that he "called Fox News in New York City to see if we were flogging a dead horse" before running the story, and that Fox News confirmed the arrest with the campaign and ran the story shortly after 6 p.m.

Upon the release of Outfoxed, Fox News issued a statement denouncing MoveOn.org, Greenwald and The New York Times for copyright infringement. Fox News dismissed their judgments of former employees featured in the documentary as the partisan views of disgruntled workers who never vocalized concern over any alleged bias while they were employed at the network. Ailes also shrugged off criticisms of the former Fox News employees by noting that they worked in Fox affiliates and not at the actual channel itself. Fox News also challenged any news organization that sought to portray Fox News as a "problem" with the following proposition: "If they put out 100 percent of their editorial directions and internal memos, Fox News Channel will publish 100 percent of our editorial directions and internal memos, and let the public decide who is fair. This includes any legitimate cable news network, broadcast network, The New York Times, Los Angeles Times, and The Washington Post."

Former Fox News personality Eric Burns has suggested in an interview that Fox News "probably gives voice to more conservatives than the other networks. But not at the expense of liberals." Burns justifies a higher exposure of conservatives by saying that other media often ignore conservatives.

Fox News personalities have also taken part in back and forth disagreements with media personalities such as Jon Stewart and Stephen Colbert.

== See also ==
- The Fox Effect
- Al Jazeera controversies and criticism
- BBC controversies
- CBS News controversies and criticism
- CNN controversies
- MS NOW criticisms and controversies
- Media bias in the United States
- Military industrial complex
- Press TV controversies
- Sensitive urban zone – January 2015 controversy
- The New York Times controversies
