= The Gatekeepers (book) =

- Author: Jacques Steinberg
- Cover artist: William Mercer
- Language: English
- Genre: nonfiction, journalism
- Publisher: Penguin Group
- Publication date: 2002
- Publication place: United States
- Media type: Print (hardcover)
- Pages: 292 p.
- ISBN: 0-670-03135-6
- OCLC: 49283806
- Dewey Decimal: 378.1/61 21
- LC Class: LB2351.2 .S72 2002

The Gatekeepers: Inside the Admissions Process of a Premier College is a 2002 nonfiction book, written by education reporter Jacques Steinberg, that examines the inner workings of the admissions committee at Wesleyan University. The book expands upon a series of articles Steinberg wrote in The New York Times. Steinberg follows six college applicants through the admissions process. The book covers issues such as affirmative action, recruiting, standardized testing and the significance of the SATs.

== Reception ==
The Gatekeepers was a New York Times bestseller.

The Harvard Education Review considered that it would offer little help to parents trying to get their children into colleges.

Beth Provinse, in the Journal of College Admissions, criticized Steinberg for focusing on one school, which she said did not reflect "the current realities of college admission." She argued that in contrast to Wesleyan's admissions practices, many colleges emphasize a numbers approach in evaluating a candidate. She cited the University of Michigan's highly publicized point system as an example.

Publishers Weekly reckoned it would not be of interest to students, but parents might buy it.

Shannon Bloomstran of The Book Reporter, said it was a "fascinating peek behind the curtain" and said that before reading she "really had no idea of the extent of agony and debate that takes place in the admissions offices of these highly selective schools."

Edward B. Fiske, editor of the highly popular Fiske Guide to Colleges, praised Steinberg for reporting on a "distinctly American rite of passage".

John Bundris of the Christian Science Monitor described The Gatekeepers as a "fitting denouement after the college applications are in the mail - for parent and student alike".

== See also ==
- College admissions
- College application
