= Network of Lies =

2023 book by Brian Stelter

Network of Lies: The Epic Saga of Fox News, Donald Trump, and the Battle for American Democracy
- Author: Brian Stelter
- Language: English
- Publisher: Atria; One Signal Publishers
- Publication date: November 14, 2023
- Publication place: United States
- Media type: Print; e-book; audiobook
- Pages: 384
- ISBN: 978-1-6680-4690-6
- Preceded by: Hoax: Donald Trump, Fox News and the Dangerous Distortion of Truth

Network of Lies: The Epic Saga of Fox News, Donald Trump, and the Battle for American Democracy is a 2023 book authored by American journalist Brian Stelter. The book analyzes the relationship between the cable news network Fox News and the first presidency of Donald Trump. A follow-up to his 2020 book, Hoax, Network of Lies picks up at the run-up to the 2020 US presidential election and follows the trajectory of Fox News through the election up to the Dominion v. Fox defamation trial, which Stelter has covered as a special correspondent for Vanity Fair. The book also focuses specifically on Tucker Carlson and his mainstreaming of white nationalism. In the weeks before the book's publication, excerpts appeared in Vanity Fair and Rolling Stone.
