= Program on International Policy Attitudes =

US research institute

The Program on International Policy Attitudes (PIPA) is an institution devoted to research on the public opinion of international politics. It is jointly run by the Center on Policy Attitudes and the Center for International and Security Studies at Maryland at the School of Public Affairs, University of Maryland, College Park.

PIPA has investigated topics such as the public perceptions of United States international politics and of international organisations (NATO, the United Nations, and the International Monetary Fund). It maintains the Americans and the World website, described as a "source of comprehensive information on US public opinion on international issues".

In January 2006, PIPA launched WorldPublicOpinion.org, a comprehensive website devoted to public opinion on international policy and affairs, stating that while "Others report what the world does, we report what the world thinks."

Sponsors include the Rockefeller Foundation, Tides Foundation and the Ford Foundation.
