= Brian Stelter =

American journalist and TV host (born 1985)

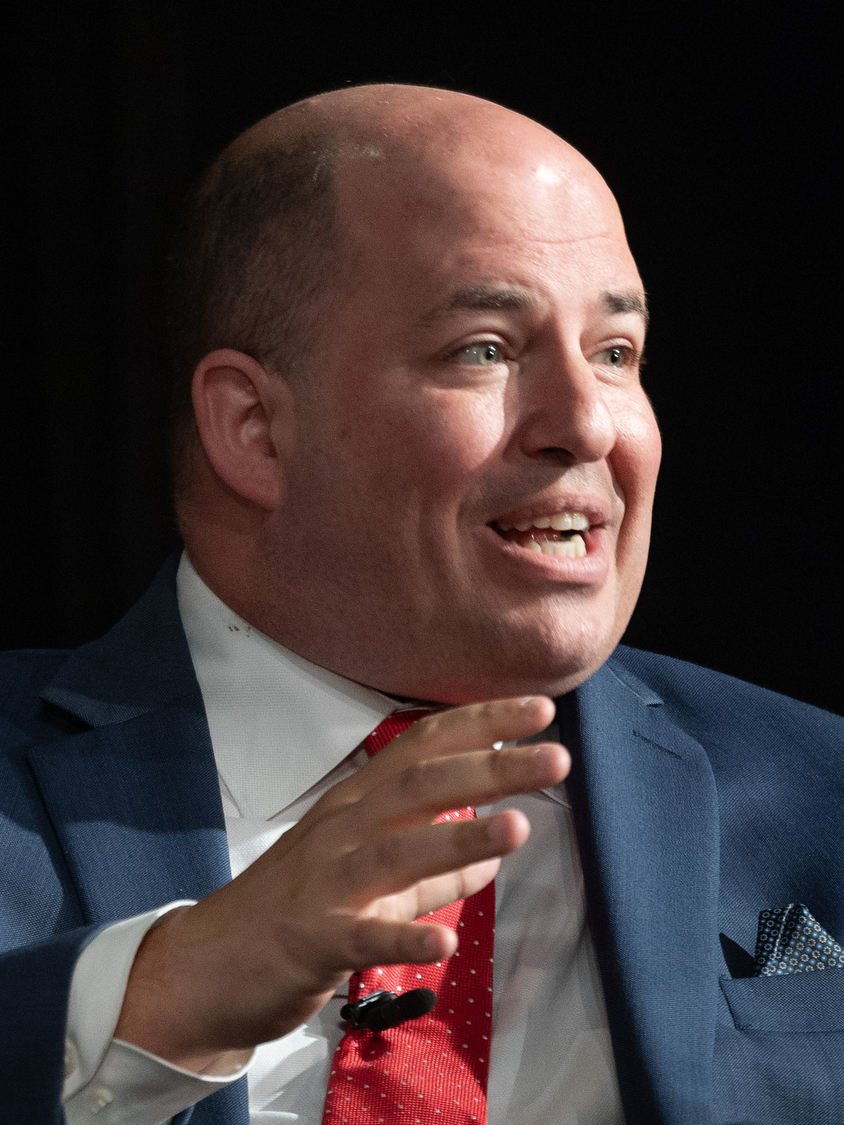
- Stelter in 2024
- Born: Brian Patrick Stelter; September 3, 1985 (age 41); Damascus, Maryland, U.S.
- Education: Towson University (BA)
- Occupations: News anchor, journalist
- Years active: 2005–present
- Spouse: Jamie Shupak (m. 2014)
- Children: 2

Brian Patrick Stelter (born September 3, 1985) is an American journalist best known as a CNN media correspondent and analyst. He hosted CNN's Reliable Sources and was chief media correspondent from 2013 to 2022, then returned to the network as media analyst in 2024. Stelter was previously a media reporter for The New York Times and editor of the blog TVNewser.

== Early life and education ==
Stelter was born on September 3, 1985, in Damascus, Maryland, the son of Donna and Mark Stelter. He attended Damascus High School, graduating in 2003, followed by Towson University where he served as editor-in-chief of The Towerlight from 2005 to 2007. While still a student, he created TVNewser, a blog about television and cable news which he later sold to Mediabistro and became a part of the Adweek blog network.

== Career ==
After graduating from college in May 2007, Stelter joined The New York Times as a media reporter at 22, making him one of the youngest staff members at the time.

In November 2013, he became the new host of CNN's Reliable Sources and also a senior media correspondent for CNN Worldwide. On August 18, 2022, CNN canceled Reliable Sources. Stelter departed the network after its final episode on August 21. The cancellation was one of a number of cost-cutting moves at CNN and its parent company Warner Bros. Discovery. Stelter criticized the network's decision to cancel the show, stating "It's not partisan to stand up for decency and democracy and dialogue."

In September 2022, Stelter joined the Walter Shorenstein Media and Democracy Fellowship at Harvard Kennedy School.

Stelter is a producer on the series The Morning Show, which is inspired by his first book Top of the Morning. He also executive produced the documentary After Truth: Disinformation and the Cost of Fake News.

On January 17, 2023, Stelter hosted a panel on "The Clear and Present Danger of Disinformation" at the World Economic Forum annual meeting in Davos.

Stelter announced a return to CNN in September 2024 as chief media analyst, again writing the newsletter for Reliable Sources. He will appear on-air and contribute to the outlet digitally, but will no longer host his own program.

== Personal life ==
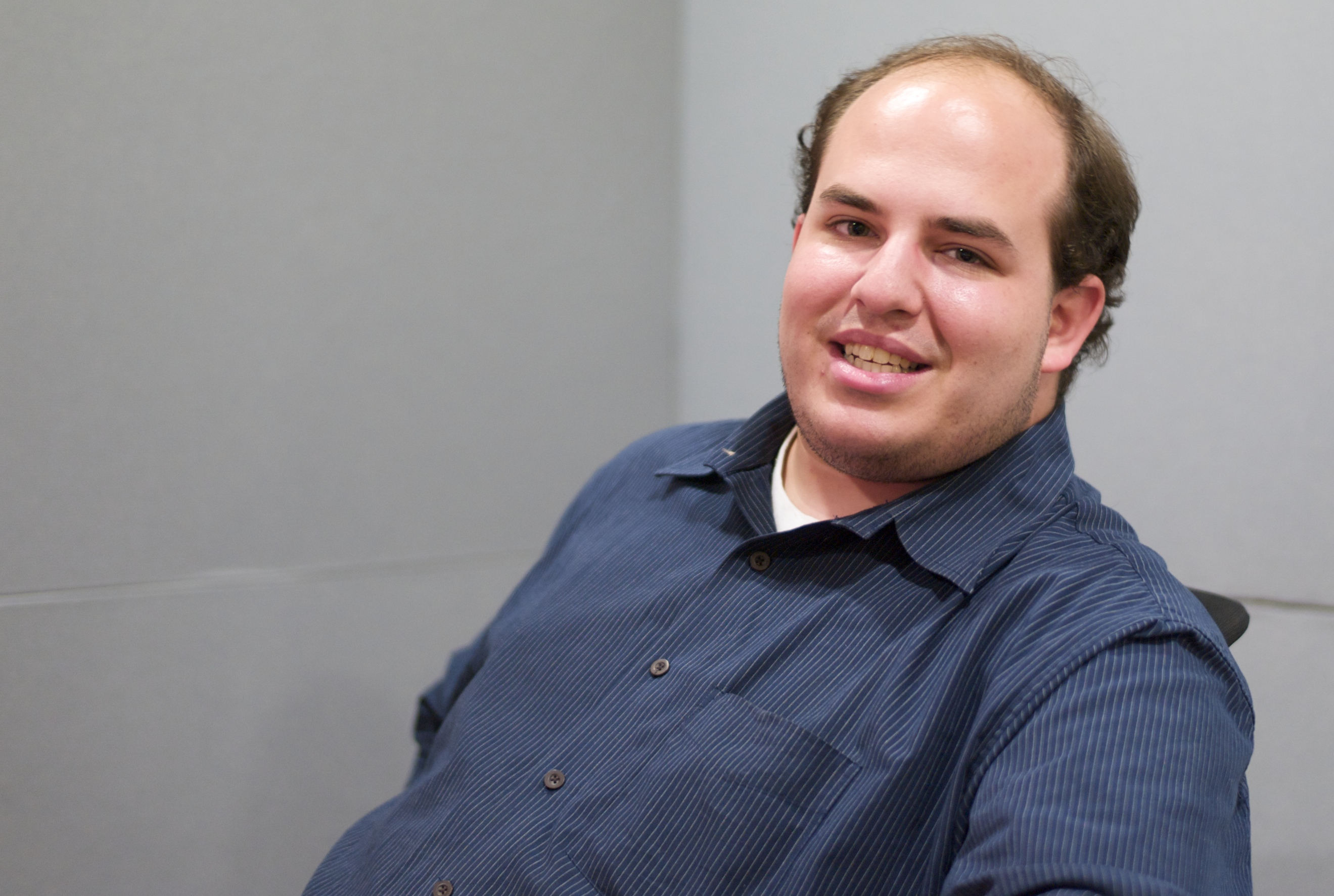
Stelter in 2009

Stelter was raised Methodist, and he is now nonreligious. Stelter dated CNBC anchor Nicole Lapin in 2011. He stated he had to inform his editor of the relationship, and he agreed not to cover CNBC while they were dating.

On February 22, 2014, he married Jamie Shupak, a traffic anchor for NY1. The couple married in a Jewish ceremony, and are raising their children in Shupak's Jewish faith. They live in Manhattan.

== Bibliography ==
- Top of the Morning (2013)
- Hoax: Donald Trump, Fox News and the Dangerous Distortion of Truth (2020)
- Network of Lies: The Epic Saga of Fox News, Donald Trump, and the Battle for American Democracy (2023)
