= Hoax (book) =

Book by Brian Stelter

Hoax: Donald Trump, Fox News and the Dangerous Distortion of Truth
- Author: Brian Stelter
- Language: English
- Publisher: Atria; One Signal Publishers
- Publication date: August 25, 2020
- Publication place: United States
- Media type: Print; e-book; audiobook
- Pages: 368
- ISBN: 978-1-9821-4244-5
- Followed by: Network of Lies: The Epic Saga of Fox News, Donald Trump, and the Battle for American Democracy

Hoax: Donald Trump, Fox News and the Dangerous Distortion of Truth is a nonfiction book by American journalist Brian Stelter, former CNN chief media correspondent. The book was first published on August 25, 2020, through Atria/One Signal Publishers and covers the entanglement of Donald Trump and Fox News.

== Synopsis ==
Stelter draws on over 250 sources, including 140 current staffers at Fox, to detail Trump's ties to Fox News and its evolution from a news network to what he describes as "state-supported TV". He charts the network's origins from its inception in 1996 under Roger Ailes to today, noting Trump's close relationship with the channel emerging back in 2012 when he was given a regular call-in spot on the show Fox & Friends, giving Trump a platform for the birtherism conspiracy and his eventual presidential run.

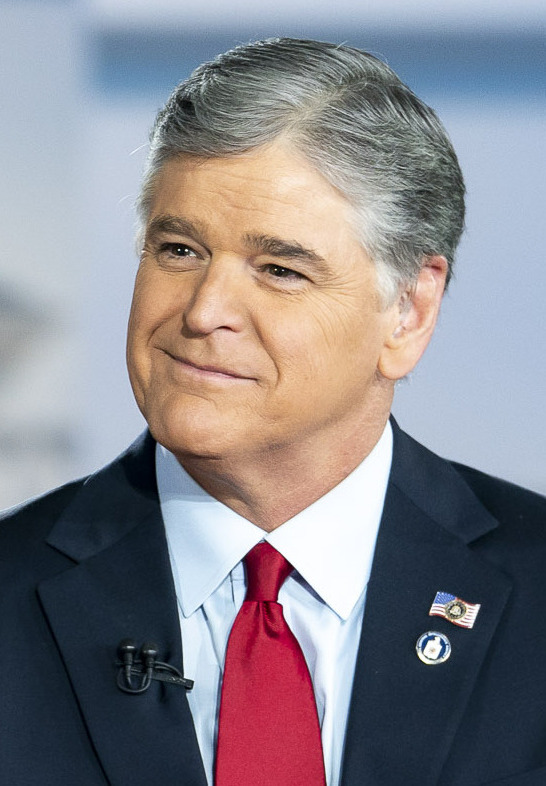
Sean Hannity

The book also details Trump's entwinement with Sean Hannity, with claims they speak almost daily, while building and sharing each other's rhetoric on such topics as rigged elections, immigration issues, the evils of the Democrats and the "fake news media". Stelter provides incidents in which Trump's campaign speeches and tweets use terminology taken from Hannity's program, and notes that Trump has used Hannity's program to test the ratings he might receive from his voter base on certain political stands or theories. Stelter also calls out Trump and the network's downplaying of the COVID-19 pandemic, with Fox News medical contributor Marc Siegel telling Hannity on March 6, 2020, that "at worst, at worst, worst case scenario, it could be the flu." Sean Hannity had at one time discouraged the use of social distancing to combat the spread of COVID-19. Stelter also credits Hannity with both pressuring FBI Director James Comey to investigate Hillary Clinton's laptop emails only days before the election as well as shifting public opinion against Hillary Clinton as a result of Comey's public statement that he was investigating the emails.

== Reception ==
Jane Eisner of Washington Post gave the book a mixed-yet-positive review, mentioning Stelter's partisan point of view that Eisner describes as "alarmist" and not detached or neutral. Eisner writes "Stelter shows Fox News accelerates and amplifies Trump's denigration of truth, disregard for facts and manipulation of a pliable public." Stelter writes “Hannity and Trump worked hand in hand to tar practically the entire American news media as ‘fake.’ Both men's hypnotic message was that Fox was the only legit network while everyone else was fraudulent,” and Eisner notes that that message is increasingly shaping the workings of the federal government. In particular, Eisner notes the books chronicle of 20 people who had jumped from the network to the White House, including a member of the Cabinet and a deputy chief of staff, concluding that the Fox worldview directly affects American policy. Eisner critiques that the book suffers from a reliance on assertions, blind quotes, and unverified accounts; though overall asserts that "the book (Hoax) exposes a collusion that threatens the pillars of our democracy."

David Bauder of the Associated Press gave a positive review, saying that the most disturbing parts of the book do not rely on insider access but are pulled directly from on-air broadcasts and the resulting Twitter feeds by Trump which very closely match the content of the broadcasts. These examples demonstrate Trump's continuous reliance on the station to directly mold much of his political stance on a variety of issues. Publishers Weekly provided a positive review, commenting that the book provides "a copious and alarming catalogue of the damage the 'Trump-Fox merger' has done to American journalism and politics." Lloyd Green of The Guardian positively reviewed the book, saying that "Brian Stelter of CNN has produced a well-sourced portrait of the symbiotic relationship between president and presenters" of Fox News. He draws attention to Stelter's message that "Fox News has deliberately and repeatedly downplayed the threat posed by Covid-19 for the sake of making Trump look good, even as the pandemic took hold in Arizona, Florida, Georgia and Texas, ie: Trump’s base."

David Enrich of The New York Times Book Review gave a mixed review, stating that Stelter excels when he explains the forces that caused Fox to embrace propaganda, while still stressing that as a CNN host, Stelter is a Fox competitor and far from impartial. Stelter has been the victim of criticism from Hannity and other hosts, but he clearly admits early on in Hoax that he is "shocked and angry" by what is happening at Fox, and that he is overtly emotional about the station's questionable relationship with facts and occasional reliance on conspiracy theories.
