= Steven Reddicliffe =

American journalist (born 1953)

- Born: 1953 (age 72–73)
- Status: married
- Occupations: editor, reporter, critic
- Notable credit(s): The New York Times, TV Guide, Parenting, Entertainment Weekly
- Spouse: Connie Reddicliffe
- Children: three children

Steven V. Reddicliffe (born 1953) is an American journalist who is the deputy editor of the travel section at The New York Times. He was the television editor for the newspaper's cultural news desk from September 2004 until early 2011.

== Career ==
After graduating from Northwestern University's Medill School of Journalism in 1975, Reddicliffe worked for several newspapers as a reporter, editor and television critic, including the Dallas Times Herald, the Miami Herald and the Baltimore News-American.

From 1989 to 1992, Reddicliffe was a founding senior editor then a general editor at Entertainment Weekly magazine, then moved with his family to San Francisco to become editor-in-chief of Parenting magazine. In August 1995, Reddicliffe became editor-in-chief of TV Guide. He stepped down from the post in 2002

== Personal ==
Reddicliffe is a son of Donald K. and Violet Reddicliffe. He and his wife, Connie, a former copy editor of the Times 's cultural news desk, have three children, James, Anna and Rebecca (triplets). They are graduates of Bates College, Colgate University, and Northwestern, respectively.
