= Zander Lehmann =

American television writer

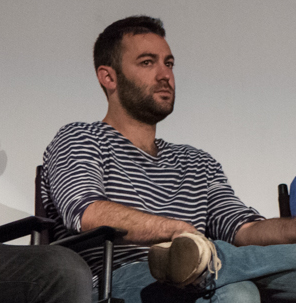
- Lehmann in 2016
- Born: Alexander Sutton Lehmann; July 13, 1987 (age 39); Santa Monica, California, United States
- Education: Washington University in St. Louis
- Occupation: TV writer
- Years active: 2015–present
- Known for: Casual
- Father: Michael Lehmann

Alexander "Zander" Sutton Lehmann (born July 13, 1987) is the creator, writer, and producer of the TV show Casual.

== Early life and education ==
Lehmann was born into a Jewish family in Santa Monica, California, the son of director Michael Lehmann and Holland Sutton. He has a younger sister.

Lehmann's family relocated to the Bay Area and in 2005, he graduated from Marin Country Day School. In 2009, Lehmann graduated from Washington University in St. Louis, where he played baseball, with a psychology degree. It was in college where Lehmann first took an interest in screenwriting, taking a class on the subject with the sole purpose of keeping his health insurance.

== Career ==
Lehmann got his start working in the mail room at ICM and then as a development assistant for four years. When he was 25 years old, Lehmann sold a pilot called Game Show to HBO. It was unproduced, although attached to director David Fincher, but led to further work in the industry.

In 2015, Lehmann's script The Beautiful Game was selected as one of the 10 best unproduced scripts, listed on The Hollywood Reporter's Black List. He sold the film to Focus Features, with Morgan Neville attached to direct.

In 2015, Lehmann was named as one of Variety's 10 TV Writers to Watch.

Lehmann got his start as a staff writer on the 2016 MTV show The Shannara Chronicles.

He sold a script to Lionsgate Television, which became the Jason Reitman-produced Hulu series Casual. Casual was Hulu's second original series. The show is co-produced with Helen Estabrook, Liz Tigelaar, and Jason Reitman – who directed the pilot as well as other episodes. It stars Michaela Watkins and Tommy Dewey as sister and brother, and Tara Lynne Barr as Watkins's daughter.

Lehmann said that Casual was inspired by his relationship with his sister, with whom he lived with for three years during their parents' divorce, and who started dating his best friend.

The series is unique in the industry as, in addition to executives and writers who are women, the majority of the episodes are directed by women. Directors include Lake Bell, Carrie Brownstein, Marielle Heller, Karyn Kusama, Gillian Robespierre, and Lynn Shelton. The show was positively received. Casual was nominated for a 2016 Golden Globe Award for Best Television Series – Musical or Comedy.

== Filmography ==
- 2015–2018: Casual (TV series) – Creator, writer, producer
- 2016: The Shannara Chronicles (TV series) – Writer (1 episode: "Pykon")
