= 3HO =

American new religious organization

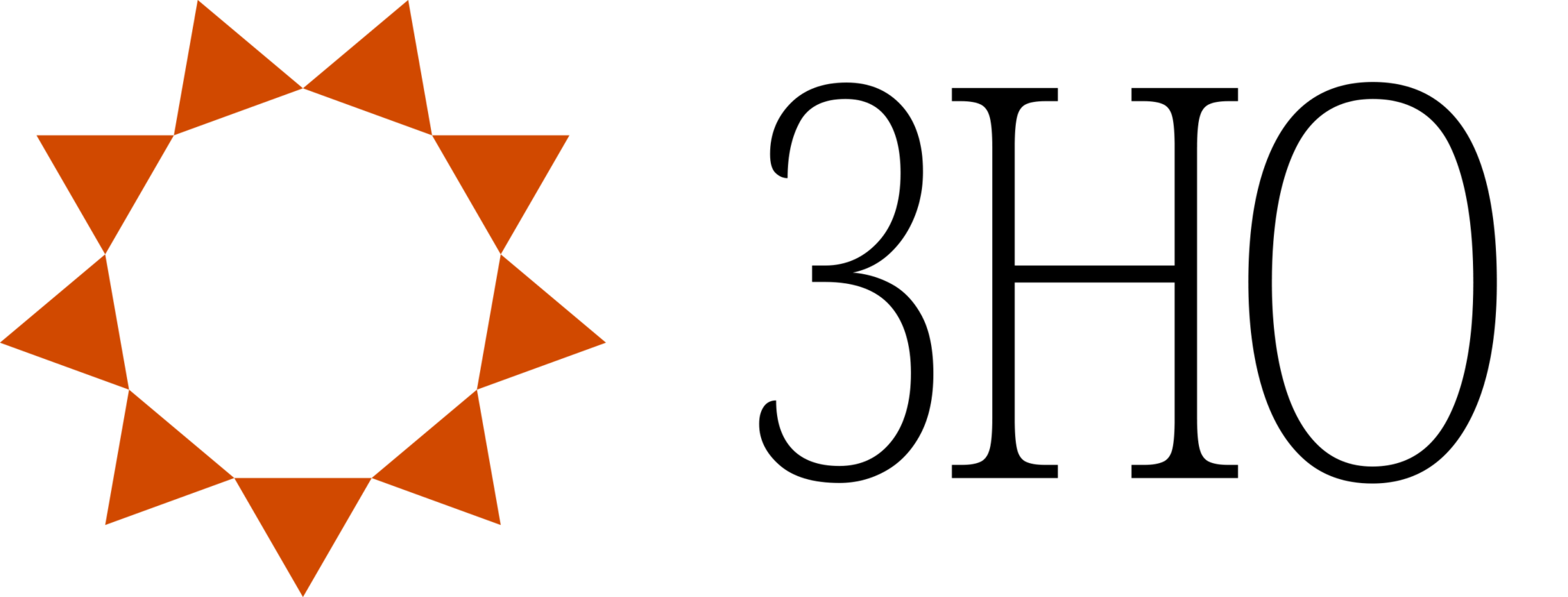

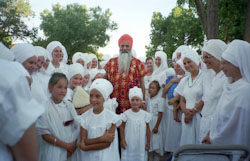
- Yogi Bhajan at Khalsa Women's Training Camp, New Mexico
- Abbreviation: 3HO
- Formation: 13 July 1969 (57 years ago) Los Angeles, United States
- Founder: Yogi Bhajan
- Type: Religious organisation
- Headquarters: Espanola, New Mexico
- Origins: Kundalini Yoga
- Region served: Worldwide
- Affiliations: Sikh Dharma International, Yogi Tea, Akal Security
- Website: www.3ho.org

3HO (Healthy, Happy, Holy Organization), also known as Sikh Dharma of the Western Hemisphere or Sikh Dharma International, is a controversial American organization founded in 1969 by Harbhajan Singh Khalsa, also called "Yogi Bhajan". Its adherents are called the Sikh Dharma Brotherhood. While referred to as the 3HO movement, "3HO" is strictly speaking the name only of the movement's educational branch. Scholars have defined 3HO as a new religious movement.

== Practices ==
The 3HO movement is known for including some practices found in certain Dharmic traditions such as meditation, vegetarianism, and yoga, particularly Kundalini yoga. 3HO believes openness to yoga and spiritual ideas are a source of strength. Both men and women wear turbans and often wear white clothes.

3HO requires its members to follow a strict lacto-vegetarian diet. The use of alcohol, recreational drugs, and tobacco is forbidden.

== Criticism ==
Although 3HO claims to practice Sikh teachings and values, the organization is largely condemned by the wider Sikh community, with some going as far as to call it a cult.

=== Condemnation by SGPC and Akal Takht ===
In 1977, Gurucharan Singh Tohra, former President of the Shiromani Gurdwara Parbandhak Committee (SGPC), stated that Harbhajan Singh was not the leader of Sikhism in the Western World as he claimed and denied Singh's claim that the SGPC had given him the title of Siri Singh Sahib.

Sikh High Priest Jaswant Singh stated that he and his council professed to be "shocked" at Bhajan's "fantastic theories." Yoga, Tantrism, and the "sexual practices" taught by Bhajan, the council declared, are "forbidden and immoral."

=== Sexual abuse allegations ===
In January 2020, Yogi Bhajan's former secretary Pamela Saharah Dyson (f.k.a. Premka) published her memoir Premka: White Bird in a Golden Cage: My Life with Yogi Bhajan, detailing the intimate non-professional, sexual relationships she and other women had with Harbhajan Singh. The release of this memoir prompted allegations of sexual, financial, and emotional abuse on the part of Yogi Bhajan and people close to him. These allegations culminated in a civil lawsuit in the city of Los Angeles against Bhajan and members of his circle. In response to the allegations 3HO hired An Olive Branch, a consultancy specializing in addressing misconduct in spiritual communities, to conduct a third-party investigation. Their report, compiled through extensive interviewing and research, determined that it was "more likely than not that Yogi Bhajan engaged in several types of sexual misconduct and abused his power as a spiritual leader."

=== Scholars' views on 3HO and Yogi Bhajan ===
Scholars including Verne A. Dusenbery and Pashaura Singh have concurred that Harbhajan Singh's introduction of Sikh teachings into the West helped identify Sikhism as a world religion while at the same time creating a compelling counter-narrative to that which identified Sikhs solely as a race with a shared history in India.

Sikh historian Trilochan Singh offered a contrasting perspective in his critical work entitled "Sikhism and Tantric Yoga." "I am extremely worried about the manner in which Yogi Bhajan teaches Sikhism to American young men and women whose sincerity, nobility of purpose, and rare passion for oriental wisdom and genuine mystical experiences is unquestionably unique. I do not care what fantastic interpretations of Kundalini Yoga he gives, the like of which I have never read in any Tantra text, nor known from any living Tantric scholar. I am not prepared to take seriously his newly invented Guru Yoga in which his pious and uncritical followers must concentrate on a particular picture of Yogi Bhajan, which practice is called mental beaming."

Philip Deslippe, a historian of American religion, wrote a 2012 article, "From Maharaj to Mahan Tantric: The Construction of Yogi Bhajan's Kundalini Yoga", using 3HO source archive material and news articles to reveal how Harbhajan Singh recreated his own story after his first trip back to India:

I set out to answer the question "where did Kundalini Yoga as taught by Yogi Bhajan (KYATBYB) come from?" and not much else. I tried to support my findings with as much evidence as possible, and for that evidence to be as clear, specific, verifiable, and close to the source, such as interviews with first hand witnesses (Pamela being one of them), quotes from Yogi Bhajan, contemporary newspaper accounts, and exercises taken from manuals. I concluded that in the early years of 3HO, Yogi Bhajan was using the physical yoga of Swami Dhirendra Brahmachari and the persona and mantra of Baba Virsa Singh, and that the figure of Sant Hazara Singh only became prominent after the first trip to India in 1970-1971 when Yogi Bhajan had a falling out with Virsa Singh.

— Philip Deslippe.

== Governance and control ==
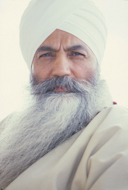
Yogi Bhajan (1985) founder of 3HO

Yogi Bhajan formed Sikh Dharma International as a California nonprofit religious corporation "organized to advance the religion of Sikh Dharma and as an association of religious organizations teaching principles of Sikh Dharma, including by ordination of ministers of divinity and operation of places of worship." During Yogi Bhajan's lifetime, Sikh Dharma International, along with related legal entities Siri Singh Sahib Corporation and Unto Infinity LLC, were held and controlled by Siri Singh Sahib of Sikh Dharma, a California "corporation sole" of which Yogi Bhajan was the only shareholder. Following the Yogi's death in 2004, a dispute ensued over the governance of those entities and assets. Yogi Bhajan's wife, Bibiji Inderjit Kaur Puri, alleged that she had been appointed to the board of Unto Infinity, and that she and their three children were appointed to the Siri Singh Sahib of Sikh Dharma board of directors (and thus in a position to exert significant control over all of the Sikh Dharma legal entities); but that following Yogi Bhajan's death the other board members of those entities improperly prevented them from taking part in governance. In January 2017, the 9th Circuit Court of Appeals determined that the lawsuit was not on its face an ecclesiastical dispute. However, in April 2018, Chief Judge Michael Mosman of the U.S. District Court for the District of Oregon dismissed the case. Judge Mosman concluded that there was significant evidence that the 3HO corporate entities were religious in character and thus that the dispute could not be adjudicated in civil court.

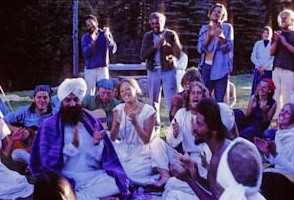
3HO summer solstice 1970

== Business ventures ==
According to anthropology professor and Sikh diaspora researcher Nicola Mooney, 3HO Sikhs have combined "ethic and capitalism" to their spiritual pursuits, with Sikh Dharma International and its associated corporate entities and directors creating and controlling the Yogi Tea and Akal Security brands with a worldwide presence.

Golden Temple of Oregon, a natural foods company that built the Peace Cereal and Yogi Tea brands, was owned by a corporate entity controlled by Yogi Bhajan, and was estimated to be worth around $100,000,000 at the time of his death. The company was transferred to Kartar Singh Khalsa for $100, sparking lawsuits over improper disposition of the assets. Golden Temple's cereal division was sold to Hearthside Food Solutions in May 2010 for $71 million; the executives were later ordered to return more than half of the sale price to a court-appointed receiver. Hearthside was later acquired by Post. Golden Temple was renamed East West Tea Company after that sale.

Another SDI-related company, Akal Security, initially hired 3HO members to guard shops and restaurants. It grew into a $500 million-a-year company with federal contracts to protect numerous government buildings in Washington, DC and elsewhere, including courthouses, airports, and embassies. The founders donated the company to the church in 1980.

Following the death of Yogi Bhajan, control over Golden Temple and Akal Security was contested in a series of lawsuits in Oregon.

=== Popular culture ===
In October 2024, HBO premiered the series Breath of Fire, which talks about the mental and sexual abuse of Yogi Bhajan, and 3HO.

== List of child organizations of 3HO ==
- Akal Security
- SikhNet
- SikhiWiki
- Yogi Tea
- Peace Cereal
