= Hari Jiwan Singh Khalsa =

American Sikh leader

Stephen J. Oxenhandler (Hari Jiwan Singh Khalsa)
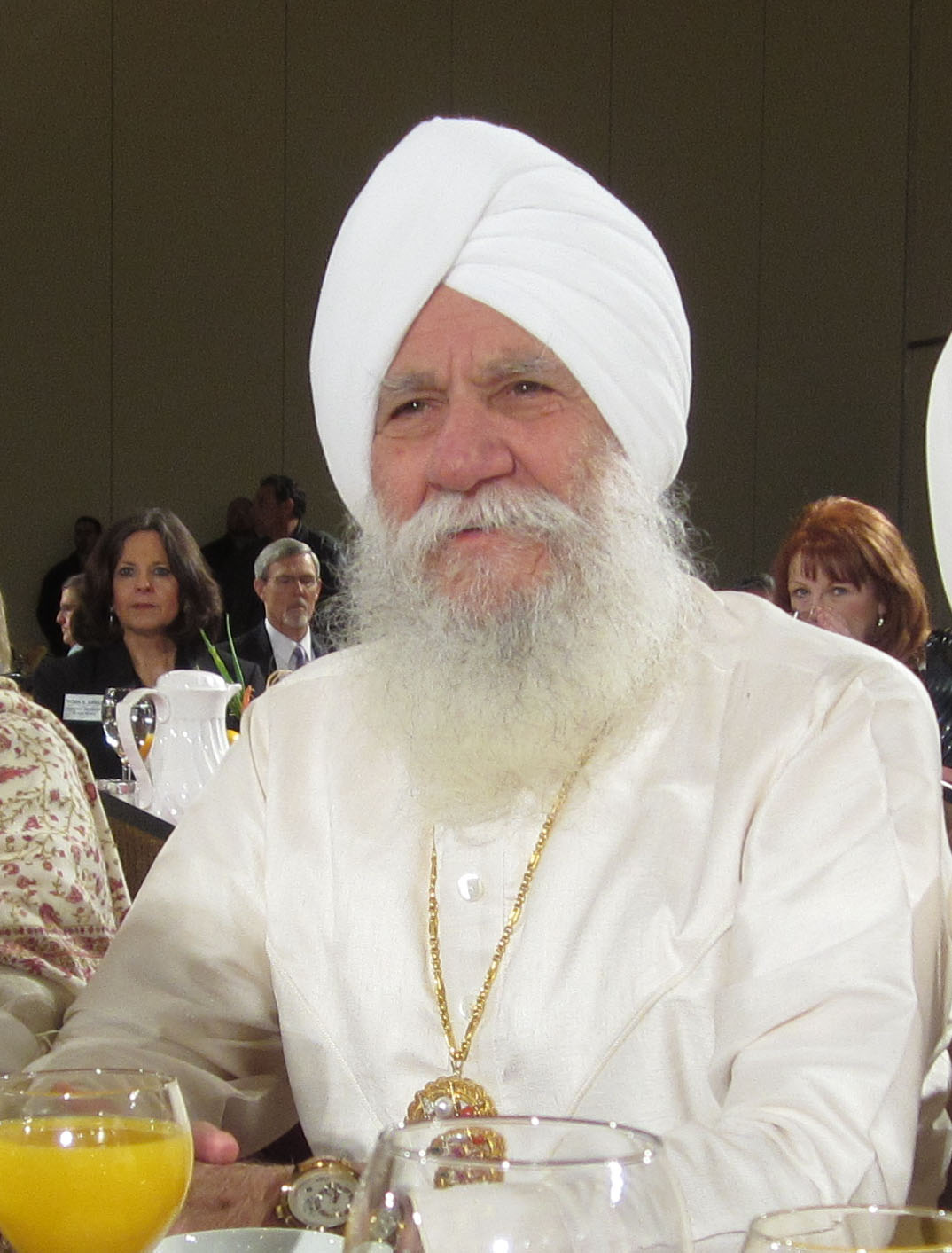
- Khalsa at Governor's Prayer Breakfast in 2012
- Born: St. Louis, Missouri, United States of America

Hari Jiwan Singh Khalsa is Chief of Protocol for the American Sikh group Sikh Dharma. In 2000 he was convicted on fraud charges, receiving the nickname "Toner Bandit."

== Early years ==
Khalsa (born Stephen Oxenhandler) was born September 29, 1942, in St. Louis, Missouri, to a well-to-do real estate development family. He was raised in a Reform Jewish community with whom he spent his youth between St. Louis and Palm Springs, California.

== Career ==
In connection with one enterprise, Sweet Song Corporation, Khalsa and his associates were sued by the FTC for a telemarketing scam in which they falsely representing the value of gemstone investments, and in 1998 were barred from engaging in any business related to collectibles investments.

In 2000 Harijiwan was sentenced to two years in federal prison for his involvement in a different telemarketing scam. The scam involved sending companies fraudulent invoices for toner, as a result of the crime Khalsa received the nickname "Toner Bandit."

Harijiwan has defended Kundalini master Yogi Bhajan against multiple allegations of rape and child abuse that emerged following his death. A 52-minute video titled “The Futile Flow of Fate” released on his website, and shared by Guru Jagat, begins, “Someone, I think, needs to speak on behalf of Yogi Bhajan.” In the video, Harijiwan claims that the accusations were made for financial gain.

== See also ==
- Breath of Fire (TV series)
