= Agnes Chu =

American businesswoman and producer

- Chu in 2026
- Born: San Diego, California
- Education: Harvard University (BA); Columbia Business School (MBA)
- Occupation: Businesswoman
- Board member of: Paley Los Angeles Board of Governors; Gold House

Agnes Chu is an American businesswoman and producer. She is most recognized for overseeing original content at the launch of Disney+ in 2019 and as president of Condé Nast Entertainment (CNE) including media brands such as GQ, The New Yorker and Vogue. In 2022, The Hollywood Reporter named her one of the "35 Most Powerful People in New York Media" and she is a member of the Academy of Motion Picture Arts and Sciences and the Academy of Television Arts and Sciences.

== Early life and education ==
Chu grew up in San Diego, California with parents who immigrated from Hong Kong. She became involved at the San Diego Junior Theatre at Balboa Park and directed productions of Stephen Sondheim and Neil Simon. Chu attended La Jolla Country Day School, graduating in 1998.

Her first language is Cantonese and she studied Mandarin during college. While attending Harvard University, she was the president of the Signet Society, and her photography was featured on the covers of The Harvard Advocate. Chu graduated from Harvard University in 2002 majoring in art, film and visual studies, and received an MBA from Columbia Business School in 2008.

== Career ==
She began her career at Alex Gibney's Jigsaw Productions, producing documentary films such as Enron: The Smartest Guys in the Room and The Blues docuseries with directors Martin Scorsese, Clint Eastwood and Wim Wenders. In 2008, Chu started working at Disney–ABC Television Group and managed the development and production of online video content for its various websites. She co-produced LOST: Mysteries of the Universe – The Dharma Initiative which was nominated for an Emmy in 2010. Chu later became the company's director of daytime and current programming for series such as General Hospital, Malibu Country and Don't Trust the B— in Apartment 23.

From 2013 to 2016, she was chief of staff for Bob Iger and vice president of his office as chairman and CEO. During this time, Chu worked with the Chinese government to open Shanghai Disney Resort, the first Disney park in the country. She became executive of story and franchise development for Walt Disney Imagineering and led the team developing attractions at Disney theme parks and other entertainment experiences. Chu was the first Disney executive to be pulled onto the company's Disney+ launch team. Working with the heads of Walt Disney Studios, Walt Disney Animation, Pixar Animation, Lucasfilm, Marvel Studios, National Geographic, Disney Branded Television and others, she set the content strategy, development and production of originals for Disney+.

As the senior vice president of content at Disney+, she was considered a "known commodity in Hollywood" and was announced to take over as president of CNE in September 2020. Chu moved from California to New York for the role, managing 450 employees. She led the company's development and production of film, television, social, livestream and audio media. Chu hired Helen Estabrook to lead CNE's film and television division, and most of her senior leadership team across film, television, audio and digital video was composed of women and people of color. Over three years as president, there were 70 film/television projects in development and 12 in production. Chu was also tasked with increasing the company's digital content and audience engagement, working to adapt region-specific content for global appeal and distribution. In 2023, CNE's digital video content generated more than 20 billion views and the Met Gala brought in 1.5 billion global video views. She left CNE in October 2023.

== Selected filmography ==
Year	Title	Role
2010	LOST: Mysteries of the Universe – The Dharma Initiative	Producer
2010	Grey's Anatomy: The Webisodes	Producer
2022	Spiderhead	Producer
2023	The Secrets of Hillsong	Executive producer
2023	High & Low: John Galliano	Executive producer
2024	Black Twitter: A People's History	Executive producer
2024	Breath of Fire	Executive producer
2026	Bedford Park (film)	Executive producer
2026	Bucking Fastard	Producer
