= SikhNet =

Sikh website

- Owner: 3HO
- Founder: Gurumustuk Singh Khalsa (website)
- Website: sikhnet.com
- Launched: 15 February 1996; 30 years ago (website)
- Current status: Active

SikhNet is a Sikh-centric website operated by the 3HO organization. SikhNet is a tax exempt 501(c)3 not-for-profit corporation in the U.S.A. It caters to what it has termed as the "cyber sangat" ("cyber congregation").

== History ==
=== Bulletin board system ===
The origins of SikhNet can be traced back to a bulletin board system (BBS) created by Guruka Singh, launched in 1983. Harbhajan Kaur and Mahan Singh in Millis, Massachusetts were the coordinators of the early SikhNet BBS. The server operated through GEnie with a 300 baud connection.

In February 1986, the SikhNet BBS server was upgraded and went online with a 10 Mhz IBM XT clone computer with a 1200 baud (later 9600 baud) modem. The SikhNet BBS was an early version of the open-source BBS software (RBBS v.15) that was hacked for customization purposes. There were around 100 users, with 20 of them being regulars. The SikhNet BBS's log-on screen contained artwork of a Khanda symbol made using ASCII art. A Clipper program was created by Ravi Har Singh Khalsa for accessing SikhNet, it was known as SikhNet-Zapper. The BBS contained a prototype-discussion forum and announcements from 3HO & Sikh Dharma International were posted for the users to view. There were also transcript recordings of Yogi Bhajan's lectures and talks stored on the BBS and daily quotations of the Guru Granth Sahib were displayed. The host-computer of the server shifted from Columbus, Ohio to Yosemite, California to Espanola, New Mexico, mirroring the moves of Guruka Singh and his family.

The SikhNet BBS became defunct in October 1994 after Guruka Singh could no longer serve as the Sysop (System Operator), thus the SikhNet BBS was taken offline.

=== Website ===
The SikhNet website was founded by Gurumustuk Singh Khalsa on 15 April 1996, coinciding with the Vaisakhi celebrations for that year. The website was founded for the purpose of education both Sikhs and non-Sikhs on the tenets of the Sikh religion in a user-friendly, peaceful, accessible, and faith-friendly manner. The website adopted the same name as the predecessor BBS system. Gurumustuk created the original HTML SikhNet website pages whilst in his early 20's for the purpose of providing a cyber space where Sikh youth from around the world could interact, hold dialogue, and support one another. The website sees itself as an avenue outside of the traditional familial and gurdwara spaces where Sikh communities could engage with each-other. The website currently has 16 employees, whom are based in the United States, Canada, India, the United Kingdom, and Peru. The website relies on donations, from its userbase, sponsors, and grantors, to operate.

The website serves as a clearing house for news articles and information on Sikh topics. The website hosts many features where Sikh liturgical texts can be examined by users. Furthermore, turban-tying tutorials can be found on the site. The website contains histories and hagiographies dating to the period of the Sikh gurus, recordings of kirtan (sacred hymns) and katha (interpretation), and positive stories of Sikhs from the U.K., Canada, and the U.S.

In 2011, the website launched an online game called Karma: the Ogre's Curse, whereby the player must maintain their Sikh religion when tempted by vices through meditation, good actions, and maintaining a Khalsa appearance.

=== Change in organizational structure ===
In April 2022, the founder Gurumustuk stepped down as CEO of SikhNet. This came as a result of serious allegations against 3HO leader Yogi Bhajan and Gurmustuk's drastic change from being a baptised Sikh to a clean-shaven man. Former bodyguard of Yogi Bhajan and 3HO critic, Gursant Singh, claimed Gurumustuk was paid a six-figure annual salary from SikhNet donations.

== Statistics ==
The website claims to have 900,000 visits per month, making it one of the largest Sikh websites globally.

== Services operated by SikhNet ==
- SikhiWiki
- SikhNet Play – the most popular service
- Daily Hukamnama
- SikhNet News
- SikhNet Animated Stories
- Siri Guru Granth Sahib online
- Matrimonial service
- Downloadable content, such as bani files, kirtan audios, Gurmukhi fonts, etc.

== Commentary ==
SikhNet is operated by 3HO (Sikh Dharma of the Western Hemisphere), an organization mostly composed of American-Sikhs of European-descent whom were influenced by Yogi Bhajan. These White Sikhs emphasize strongly upon the Khalsa's outward form by promoting the 5 Ks, wearing traditional Punjabi clothing that is white in-colour, and the wearing of a turban, for both men and women. Whilst the website was founded by White Sikhs, many users of SikhNet are of a traditional, mainstream Punjabi Sikh-background, in-addition to the 3HO Sikhs. SikhNet promotes an image of Punjabi Sikhs who may or may not cut their hair or tie a turban or White Sikhs who keep their hair uncut and wear a turban.

The website has been described as Khalsa-centric, a phenomenon described as "Khalsa-ism" by Sikhologist Doris Jakobsh. Doris Jakobsh states that the Sikh Internet is disproportionately influenced by White Sikhs of 3HO. For example, many of the freely available images of Sikhs online is of White Sikh women who converted to the 3HO sect of Sikhism. These portrayals may be misleading as 3HO White Sikh women usually wear turbans but the vast majority of Punjabi Sikh women, whom constitute the vast majority of Sikh women, rarely wear turbans. Furthermore, 3HO websites often depict Sikhs as those who wear turbans, even though many Sikh youth in the Punjab cut their hair and do not don a turban. Jakobsh states that even though 3HO White Sikh make-up a tiny percentage of the overall Sikh population, they dominate the Sikh Internet realm, stating that this minority acting as representatives for the wider faith has large ramifications.

After the September 11 attacks, the SikhNet homepage featured a collage with the wording “SIKHS” showcasing Sikh men, women, and children with American flags, and “Proud to be AMERICANS” written beneath.

Conner Singh VanderBeek contrasts websites like SikhNet with Khalistani-affiliated websites that once existed in the early decades of the World Wide Web. SikhNet promotes a peaceful, non-threatening, authority-abiding, and respect for politics, in its relationship with the concept of a nation-state, with websites like SikhNet serving as a "positive optic" for Sikhs in the West.
