= Akal Security =

American security company

Akal Security, Inc.
- Founder: Daya S. Khalsa; Gurutej Khalsa
- Headquarters: 7 Infinity Loop; Espanola, NM, United States
- Key people: Nirmal Kaur Khalsa (CEO); Daya S. Khalsa (President and founder)
- Number of employees: 12,000
- Subsidiaries: Coastal International Security
- Website: www.akalsecurity.com

Akal Security, Inc. is a security company which has federal contracts to guard immigration detention centers, federal courthouses, NASA facilities, federal buildings in Washington, D.C., and numerous embassies under construction. Akal Security and a subsidiary company, Coastal International Security, have received over $1 billion in federal security contracts. Akal Security is one of a number of companies owned and operated by the 3HO Sikh sangat, founded by Yogi Bhajan.

== History ==
Akal Security, Inc. was founded in 1980 by Gurutej Khalsa, who found that, though he had studied law enforcement, "his beard and turban prevented him from getting a job". At the advice of Yogi Bhajan, Gurutej Khalsa started the company with a $1,200 loan from co-founder Daya Singh Khalsa.

Akal Security had a large expansion in contracts after the September 11th attacks because it was able to recruit a large number of former law enforcement and military personnel. According to The New York Times, the company has benefited from the Army's low-price approach to determining contracts because Akal Security has low overhead and good past performances.
