= Breath of Fire (TV series) =

American documentary series

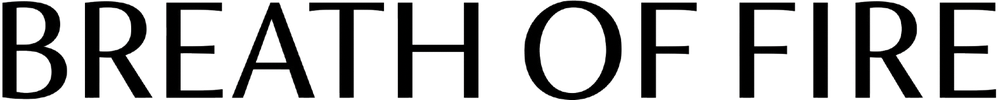
- Genre: Documentary
- Directed by: Hayley Pappas; Smiley Stevens
- Music by: Sarah Lipstate
- Country of origin: United States
- Original language: English
- No. of episodes: 4

Production
- Executive producers: Hayley Pappas; Smiley Stevens; Matt Ippolito; Agnes Chu; Helen Estabrook; Sarah Amos; Lexy Altman; Sonia Slutsky; Jennifer O’Connell; Lizzie Fox
- Cinematography: Cole Ellett; Adam Stone
- Editors: Eric F. Martin; Adam Ridley
- Running time: 51-64 minutes
- Production companies: HBO Documentary Films; Vanity Fair Studios; SecondNature

Original release
- Network: HBO
- Release: October 23 – November 13, 2024

Breath of Fire is an American documentary series directed and produced by Hayley Pappas and Smiley Stevens. It follows the life and career of Guru Jagat, including the life of Yogi Bhajan (her spiritual teacher) who was accused of sexual abuse. Additionally, the series explores the history and origins of Kundalini yoga.

It had its world premiere at the Tribeca Festival on June 12, 2024. and premiered on October 23, 2024, on HBO.

== Premise ==
The series explores the life and career of Guru Jagat, a Kundalini yoga teacher, whose spiritual empire is faced with accusations of abuse. Additionally the series explores the origins and history of Kundalini.

== Episodes ==
No.	Title	Directed by	Original release date	U.S. viewers (millions)
1	"Episode One"	Hayley Pappas; Smiley Stevens	October 23, 2024	N/A
2	"Episode Two"	Hayley Pappas; Smiley Stevens	October 30, 2024	N/A
3	"Episode Three"	Hayley Pappas; Smiley Stevens	November 6, 2024	N/A
4	"Episode Four"	Hayley Pappas; Smiley Stevens	November 13, 2024	N/A

== Production ==
In December 2021, it was announced HBO Max had greenlit a documentary series revolving around Guru Jagat, with Hayley Pappas and Smiley Stevens set to direct, based upon reporting from Vanity Fair who will also co-produce.

== Reception ==
John Anderson of The Wall Street Journal praised the series and its editing writing: "Breath of Fire” comes in four episodes that skip along briskly, a viewer being just as beguiled, or bewildered, by the rise and fall of Guru Jagat as they are by the gullibility of her followers." Joel Keller of Decider.com suggested viewing the series writing: "Breath Of Fire takes its entire first episode to set up the controversies surrounding the Kundalini Yoga movement and its two best-known leaders, but even after slogging through that first episode, we still want to learn more."

== See also ==
- Hari Jiwan Singh Khalsa
