= God Bless America (film) =

2011 film by Bobcat Goldthwait

- Promotional poster
- Directed by: Bobcat Goldthwait
- Written by: Bobcat Goldthwait
- Produced by: Sean McKittrick; Jeff Culotta
- Starring: Joel Murray; Tara Lynne Barr
- Cinematography: Bradley Stonesifer
- Edited by: Jason Stewart
- Music by: Matt Kollar
- Production company: Darko Entertainment
- Distributed by: Magnolia Pictures
- Release dates: September 9, 2011 (TIFF); April 6, 2012 (United States)
- Running time: 105 minutes
- Country: United States
- Language: English
- Box office: $123,000

God Bless America is a 2011 American black comedy film written and directed by Bobcat Goldthwait. Combining elements of political satire with dark humor, the film stars Joel Murray and Tara Lynne Barr as a middle-aged man and a teenage girl who go on a killing spree after bonding over their disgust of what American culture has become in a post-9/11 world.

== Plot ==
Frank Murdoch is a middle-aged insurance salesman who is sick of how America has fallen into a state of depravity based on pop culture, TV, the Internet, and talk radio. He fantasizes about killing his neighbors, whose screaming baby worsens his migraines and keeps him awake all night. The following day, the neighbor blocks his old car with their sports car, and he is frustrated when they act like he is imposing by asking them to move it. Meanwhile, Frank's ex-wife Alison has custody of their daughter Ava, who has become a spoiled brat. Frank is fired when he obtains a co-worker's address without permission to send her roses after she tells him she is feeling down. His uninterested doctor later tells him that he has a terminal brain tumor.

That evening, Frank watches television, and his attention is caught by American Superstarz, a talent show featuring an intellectually disabled man named Steven Clark, whom the judges mock for his attempts at singing. Frank prepares to shoot himself but stops when he sees a reality show about Chloe, an extremely spoiled teenager, which gives him an epiphany. He steals his neighbor's car and drives to Chloe's school; after unsuccessfully attempting to blow her up in her car, he simply shoots her through the window. Fellow student Roxanne "Roxy" Harmon witnesses this and applauds Frank despite initially chastising him because she thought he was a pervert spying on Chloe. Roxy follows Frank back to his motel, where he is once again preparing to shoot himself, and he agrees to let her watch him do so; instead, she decides to talk him out of it. Frank explains that he only wants terrible people to die, and Roxy suggests they kill Chloe's parents, who only mourn the financial loss their daughter's death has brought them.

The two travel to Chloe's home, where Frank shoots Chloe's father, and Roxy stabs Chloe's mother. Roxy convinces Frank to let her join his killing spree by revealing that she is trailer trash who is at the mercy of a drug-addicted mother and rapist stepfather. They watch a documentary about the Mỹ Lai Massacre in a cinema, where several teenagers begin acting obnoxiously. Frank and Roxy shoot all of them except for the one who did not do anything disruptive, and Frank thanks her for it after killing a man who is recording his actions on a cell phone. Frank and Roxy kill several more people, such as a rude man who double-parks his car, a group of far-right religious protesters, and a popular right-wing political commentator. Frank spares the life of his ex-wife's new fiancé, telling Roxy that death would be an easier fate than leaving the man alive to suffer with Frank's ex-wife and selfish daughter. Roxy suggests to Frank that they move to France and "go legit" with a plan to raise goats and make cheese while avoiding prosecution for the murders they have committed, as France would not extradite them.

Frank's doctor calls him and reveals that he has no tumor, as his MRI results were mixed up with that of a similarly named patient who does. While eating breakfast at a motel with Roxy, Frank's new lease on life is ruined when a man at the following table assumes that Roxy is an underage prostitute and that Frank is her pimp. Later, Frank sees a missing person report on the news in which Roxy's parents are revealed to be wholesome, middle-class, and concerned about her safety. Enraged at Roxy for lying to him, Frank takes out his anger on the man who wanted to hire Roxy for sex by strangling him to death. Frank tells Roxy that he knows the truth, and she confesses but explains that she wants to escape a life of bland conformity. Frank gives her the keys to his neighbor's car and leaves in the pickup truck of the man he just killed.

Frank buys an assault rifle from an arms dealer and sees another TV news report revealing that Roxy is back home with her parents and that police are searching for her apparent abductor. He gains access to the American Superstarz studio, kills several audience members and a judge, and holds everybody else in the studio hostage. As the police arrive, Roxy joins Frank onstage and apologizes for lying to him. Frank gives a speech in front of the TV camera about the negative behavior promoted in today's American society and mentions that he heard about the suicide attempt by Steven, the disabled singing man who is now in the studio as a guest performer; Steven reveals that he did not attempt suicide because they mocked him, but rather because they had no plans to put him back on TV. Frank turns to Roxy and tells her that she is pretty—a question he had refused to answer earlier due to her young age—and the two shoot Steven, the judges, and various audience members before being gunned down by the police.

== Cast ==
- Joel Murray as Frank Murdoch
- Tara Lynne Barr as Roxanne "Roxy" Harmon
- Mackenzie Brooke Smith as Ava
- Melinda Page Hamilton as Alison
- Rich McDonald as Brad
- Regan Burns as Michael Fuller
- Aris Alvarado as Steven Clark
- Maddie Hasson as Chloe
- Geoff Pierson as Frank's boss
- Larry Miller as Chloe's father
- Dorie Barton as Chloe's mother
- David Mendenhall as Mr. Harmon
- Andrea Harper as Mrs. Harmon
- Travis Wester as Ed
- Mike Tristano as Mike
- Sandra Vergara as Mercedes Paar
- Toby Huss as theater patron with cell phone
- Mo Gaffney as lounge singer
- Kirk Bovill as police captain
- Romeo Brown as John Tyler
- Michael Carbonaro as Robbie Barkley
- Bryce Johnson as co-worker
- Tom Kenny and Jill Talley as office staff
- Jack Plotnick and Tom Lenk as party planners
- Steve Agee as American Superstarz crew member

== Festivals ==
God Bless America was selected to screen at the Toronto International Film Festival, South By Southwest Film Festival, as well as the Maryland Film Festival and the Brisbane International Film Festival.

== Release ==
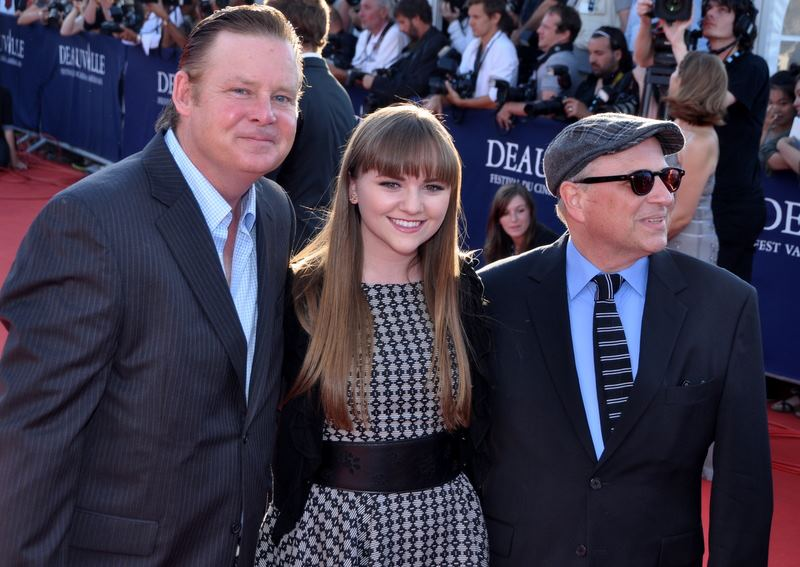
Joel Murray, Tara Lynne Barr, and Bobcat Goldthwait promoting the film at the 2012 Deauville American Film Festival

God Bless America premiered on September 9, 2011, at the 2011 Toronto International Film Festival, and was released video on demand on April 6, 2012, and in theatres on May 11, 2012. The DVD and Blu-ray for the film were released on July 3, 2012.

=== Critical response ===
As of June 2020, the film holds a 65% approval rating on the review aggregator website Rotten Tomatoes based on 114 reviews, and the average rating is 6.17/10. Its consensus reads: "A darkly comic polemic on modern culture, God Bless America is uneven and somewhat thin, but the ideas behind this revenge fulfillment journey have primal appeal." Metacritic, which assigns a rating out of 100 to reviews from mainstream critics, gave a weighted average score of 56 out of 100 based on 24 reviews, indicating "mixed or average" reviews.

Chicago Sun-Times critic Roger Ebert gave the film 2 stars out 4, and wrote: "this is a film that begins with merciless comic savagery and descends into merely merciless savagery. But wow, what an opening." James Berardinelli of Reelviews praised the film by giving 3 stars out of 4, calling it "funny but it is also at times uncomfortable". Owen Gleiberman of Entertainment Weekly gave a C, and described the film as "a burlesque that turns into a harangue that turns into a rampage." Ella Taylor of NPR gave a positive review, and wrote: "God Bless America ends with a couple of tale-twisting bullet orgies designed to take your preconceptions, as well as your nerve-endings, by surprise."

=== Accolades ===
Year	Award	Category	Recipient	Result	Ref.
2013	Young Artist Award	Best Performance in a Feature Film – Leading Young Actress	Tara Lynne Barr	Nominated	
