= Oscar Gomez (activist) =

Chicano activist (died 1994)

Oscar Gomez Jr. was a Mexican-American Chicano student activist, who was active in the 1990s while attending the University of California Davis. Gomez died in unexplained circumstances in 1994 while attending a student protest.

== Early life and education ==
Gomez was raised in Baldwin Park, California. He was born to father Oscar Gomez Snr.

He studied Chicano Studies and Behavioural Science at the University of California Davis from 1990 until his 1994 death.

Gomez led protests on the anniversary of the arrival of Christopher Columbus in 1992, and supported students who were hunger striking to draw attention to their desire for a Chicano studies department at University of California, Los Angeles in 1993. In 1994, he was critical of California's Proposition 187 initiative to prevent migrants from accessing healthcare and education. Adopting the stage-name of El Bandido (English: The Bandit) Gomez hosted the La Onda Xicana (English: The Mexican Wave) radio show on university radio station KDVS that featured interviews and music. El Bandito was named after the Mexican hero and American outlaw Joaquin Murrieta.

== Death ==
Gomez died at a student protest Santa Barbara on November 16, 1994. His body was discovered by the County Sheriff's Department just after midnight on the 17th near the shoreline. Police believe he fell from the cliffs, while his family suspect he was murdered.

The Santa Barbara coroner attributed his death to "severe cranial trauma" but did not categorise the death as either a suicide, accident, or homicide; due to an absence of witnesses or evidence, the manner of his death is reported as unknown.

== Aftermath ==
Gomez's funeral was held at the St. John The Baptist Church, Baldwin Park.

The LUCHA Foundation scholarship was launched in 2004 in tribute to Gomez. Gomez was the subject of a 2012 documentary, produced by film-maker Pepe Urquijo. Gomez was posthumously awarded his degree in March 2022. Later in 2022, Gomez's death was featured in season two of LAist's podcast Imperfect Paradise. During the 2022 Day of the Dead traditional holiday period, inspired by the podcast, University of California, Santa Barbara students held a vigil for Gomez and built an altar on the university's Manzanita Village campus.

== See also ==
- Chicano Movement
- List of unsolved deaths
