= Imperfect Paradise =

Podcast

- Season 1 logo

Presentation
- Genre: True crime, misinformation, social issues
- Language: English
- Length: 20–45 minutes

Production
- Production: LAist
- No. of seasons: 4

Publication
- Original release: 28 Jan 2022

Imperfect Paradise is a podcast series published by LAist Studios and funded by the Corporation for Public Broadcasting.

== Production and awards ==
Season one, episode one was released in January 2022.

Season three was shortlisted for a 2022 International Documentary Association Best Multi-Part Audio Documentary or Series.

== Seasons ==
1. Home is Life, 3 episodes about homelessness and housing in Orange County, California. Season 1 was hosted by Jill Replogle.
2. The Forgotten Revolutionary, 8 episodes about the life and death of activist and broadcaster Oscar Gomez. Season 2 was hosted by Adolfo Guzman-Lopez.
3. Sheriff Villanueva, 5 episodes about the election and work of Los Angeles County Sheriff Alex Villanueva. Season 3 was hosted by Frank Stoltze.
4. Yoga’s Queen of Conspiracies, 3 episodes focussing on the work of American yoga instructor Guru Jagat's adoption of QAnon conspiracy theories. Season 4 was produced and hosted by Emily Guerin.
