= SikhiWiki =

Sikh online encyclopedia

- Owner: SikhNet branch of 3HO
- Founders: Ash Singh; Gurumustuk Singh Khalsa
- Website: sikhiwiki.org
- Registration: Optional
- Users: 93,526 (July 2024)
- Launched: 2005; 21 years ago
- Current status: Active

SikhiWiki is a Sikh-centric online encyclopedia operated by the 3HO organization under its SikhNet umbrella.

== History ==
The idea of creating an online Sikh encyclopedia is attributed to Ash Singh after he had a television interview where the importance of documenting Sikh history, from both the distant past and present, was discussed. Ash Singh partnered with Gurumustuk Singh Khalsa, then webmaster of SikhNet, to create SikhiWiki. SikhiWiki was launched in 2005. The website was inspired by Wikipedia and claims to cover "Sikh philosophy, history, culture and lifestyle". The website is open to the wider community who can freely edit its pages. The operators used the term 'encyclomedia' to describe their website. SikhiWiki is maintained by SikhNet and most of the individuals maintaining it are volunteers.

== Statistics ==
As of March 2012, there were nearly 6,000 articles hosted on SikhiWiki. As of July 2024, the website contains 6,359 articles and 10,123 uploaded files, with 93,526 registered members.

== Commentary ==
According to Conner Singh VanderBeek, SikhiWiki provides "... the most comprehensive resource on basic terms, tenets, and histories of the Sikh faith". SikhiWiki does not absolve Sikh separatists as guiltless in its article covering the Khalistan movement. Doctrinal discussions and debates also occur on SikhiWiki, such as on the practice of vegetarianism.

SikhiWiki promotes a mainstream, normative, orthodox, Khalsa-orientated narrative of the Sikh religion. An example of this is on their article covering the heterodoxical Namdhari sect, which contains a disclaimer warning about sects and cults that evolved after the timeline of the Sikh gurus. This disclaimer is followed by a further explanation warning about sects, cults, "fake" babas, deras, "fake" Nihangs, Sanatan Dharmis, "pseudo" Akalis and Mahants, "pseudo" intellectuals and historians, leftists, and agnostics, which it claims are "not considered a part of Sikhism". SikhiWiki asserts that these above groups are distortions of Gurmat (the true teachings of Sikhism) created to damage Sikhism. It further claims that none of the above groups were created by a guru or bhagat. This leads to Sikhs belonging to heterodoxical, non-normative Sikh sects to go elsewhere for information.
