= Casual (TV series) =

2010s American TV series

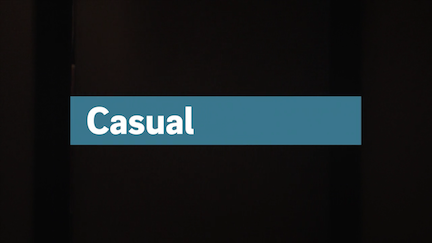
- Genre: Comedy drama
- Created by: Zander Lehmann
- Starring: Michaela Watkins; Tommy Dewey; Tara Lynne Barr; Nyasha Hatendi; Frances Conroy; Julie Berman
- Country of origin: United States
- Original language: English
- No. of seasons: 4
- No. of episodes: 44

Production
- Executive producers: Jason Reitman; Zander Lehmann; Helen Estabrook; Liz Tigelaar
- Camera setup: Single-camera
- Running time: 25–31 minutes
- Production companies: Right of Way Films; Lionsgate Television

Original release
- Network: Hulu
- Release: October 7, 2015 – July 31, 2018

Casual is an American television comedy drama television series that premiered on October 7, 2015, on Hulu. Created by Zander Lehmann and directed by Jason Reitman, it centers on Valerie (Michaela Watkins), a newly divorced single mother living with her brother Alex (Tommy Dewey) and her daughter Laura (Tara Lynne Barr). The cast also includes Frances Conroy and Nyasha Hatendi.

In advance of its premiere on Hulu, the first two episodes received a preview screening at the 2015 Toronto International Film Festival as part of the festival's new Primetime platform of selected television projects.

On October 19, 2017, Hulu renewed the series for a fourth and final season with all eight episodes released simultaneously on July 31, 2018.

== Cast and characters ==
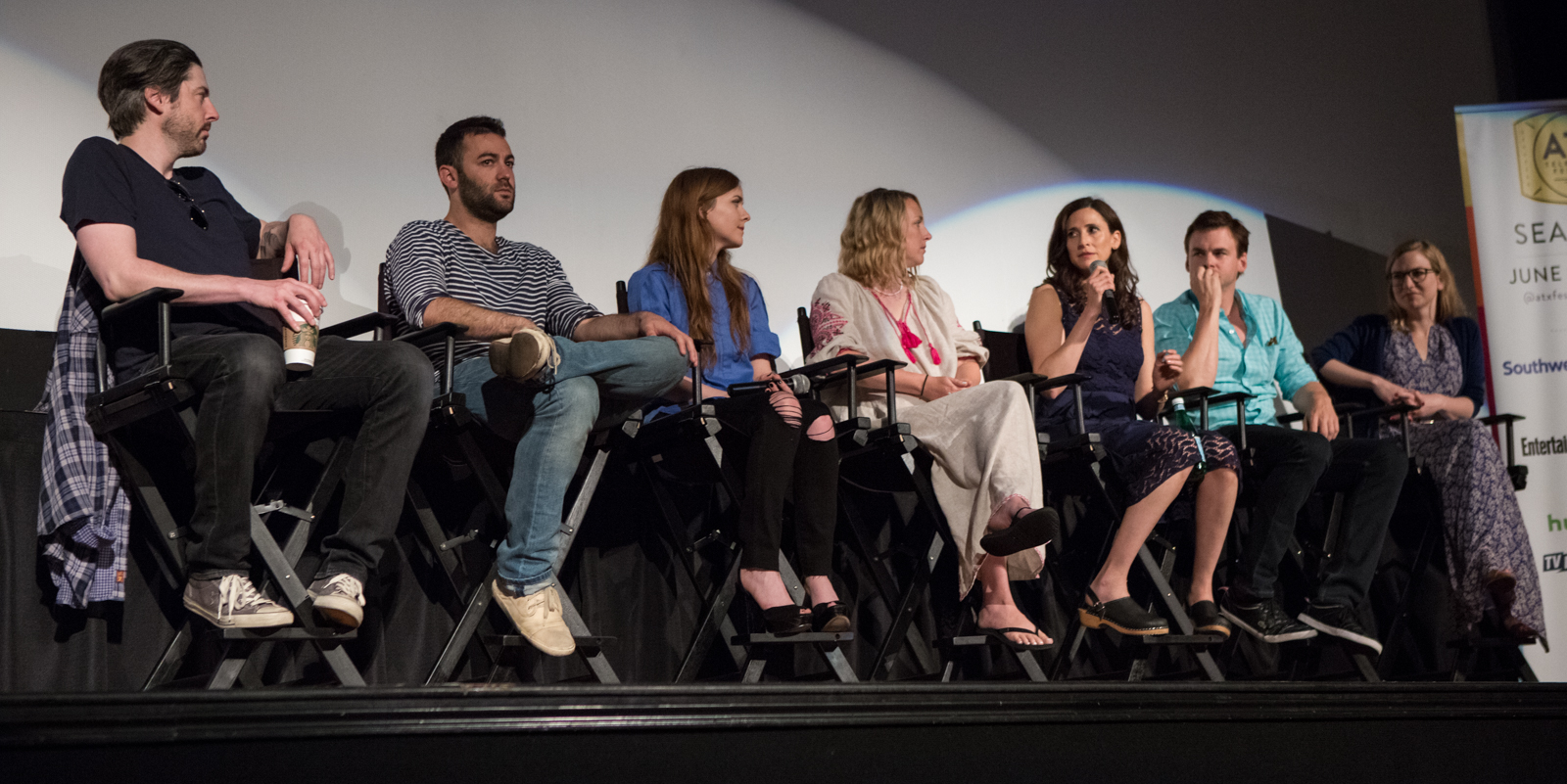
The cast & crew of the TV show Casual at the ATX TV Festival presentation for it. From left: Jason Reitman, Zander Lehmann, Tara Lynne Barr, Liz Tigelaar, Michaela Watkins, Tommy Dewey and Helen Estabrook

=== Main ===
- Michaela Watkins as Valerie, a successful therapist divorcing her husband after finding him with a younger woman
- Tommy Dewey as Alex, Valerie's younger brother who co-founded the popular dating site Snooger
- Tara Lynne Barr as Laura, Valerie's teenage daughter
- Nyasha Hatendi as Leon, Valerie's one-night stand whom Alex befriends
- Julie Berman as Leia, Valerie's assistant

=== Guest and recurring ===
- Fred Melamed as Charles, Valerie and Alex's hedonistic father
- Evan Crooks as Emile, Laura's ex-boyfriend
- Alisha Boe as Becca, Laura's friend
- Taylor Spreitler as Mia, Laura's friend
- Frances Conroy as Dawn, Valerie and Alex's mother
- Patrick Heusinger as Michael, Laura's photography teacher
- Zak Orth as Drew, Valerie's ex-husband
- Eliza Coupe as Emmy, Alex's free-spirited romantic interest
- Katie Aselton as Jennifer, a therapist who works in the same building as Valerie
- Dylan Gelula as Aubrey, a student in Laura's homeschool group
- Britt Lower as Sarah Finn, Alex's ex-girlfriend
- Vincent Kartheiser as Jordan Anderson, Alex's new partner in his company and Sarah's fiancé
- Britt Robertson as Fallon, Jordan's assistant
- Kyle Bornheimer as Jack, Valerie's love interest, friend of Jennifer
- Rhenzy Feliz as Spencer, Laura's classmate and boyfriend, who has terminal cancer
- Jamie Chung as Tina Valerie's landlord who becomes involved with Alex
- Nadine Nicole as Casey, Laura's boss and an environmental activist
- Maya Erskine as Rae, Alex's roommate and the mother of his daughter, Carrie
- Judy Greer as Judy, a single mom who also hires Alex to work in her company's IT department
- Lorenza Izzo as Tathiana, Laura's girlfriend she met while traveling
- Nicky Katt as Cyril, a mechanic. This was his last role before his untimely death in 2025. It was his first acting job in about 5 years.

== Episodes ==
=== Series overview ===
Season	Episodes	Originally released	
Season	Episodes	First released	Last released
1	10	October 7, 2015	December 2, 2015
2	13	June 7, 2016	August 23, 2016
3	13	May 23, 2017	August 1, 2017
4	8	July 31, 2018	

=== Season 1 (2015) ===
No. overall	No. in season	Title	Directed by	Written by	Original release date
1	1	"Pilot"	Jason Reitman	Zander Lehmann	October 7, 2015
Valerie and Alex go on dates based on matches on Alex's own dating website.
2	2	"Friends"	Jason Reitman	Zander Lehmann	October 7, 2015
Alex spends the day with Valerie's one night stand Leon, and winds up having a crazy night. Valerie goes out with a group of 20-something girls who coach her on dating young men. Laura gets in trouble at a high school house party.
3	3	"Animals"	Max Winkler	Zander Lehmann	October 14, 2015
Valerie decides to move out of Alex's house but is blind-sided by the financial repercussions of divorce. Alex adopts a dog. Laura fantasizes about her photography teacher Michael.
4	4	"..."	Max Winkler	Zander Lehmann	October 21, 2015
Valerie breaks Alex's rules of casual sex. Alex is interviewed about his dating site. Laura makes a move on her teacher Michael.
5	5	"Mom"	Michael Weaver	Sheila Callaghan	October 28, 2015
Valerie and Alex's mother shows up unannounced. Valerie gets good advice from an unlikely source. Laura and Michael share a moment after she sees her father out with his new girlfriend.
6	6	"Biden"	Michael Weaver	Liz Tigelaar	November 4, 2015
Alex's secret profile gets its first real match. Laura bonds with Michael after her sex tape goes viral at school. Valerie gets closure with her ex-husband.
7	7	"Home"	Tricia Brock	Harris Danow	November 11, 2015
Alex and Emmy (Eliza Coupe) have a foursome. Laura discovers Valerie has been seeing Michael and moves out.
8	8	"Bottles"	Tricia Brock	Zander Lehmann & Harris Danow	November 18, 2015
Laura invites her estranged grandparents and her father and his new girlfriend to Thanksgiving dinner without telling Valerie or Alex.
9	9	"Mars"	Fred Savage	Halsted Sullivan	November 25, 2015
Alex and Valerie attend their parents' wedding rehearsal dinner. Laura attends a gallery where Michael is showing some of his photographs.
10	10	"Dave"	Fred Savage	Zander Lehmann	December 2, 2015
Alex leaves the rehearsal dinner to spend the night at Leon's house. Valerie and Emmy spend the day trying to find him. Laura plans to move to Mexico.

=== Season 2 (2016) ===
No. overall	No. in season	Title	Directed by	Written by	Original release date
11	1	"Phase 3"	Jason Reitman	Zander Lehmann	June 7, 2016
Alex's troubling new obsession leads Valerie to take matters into her own hands. Laura investigates switching high schools.
12	2	"Trivial Pursuit"	Jason Reitman	Liz Tigelaar	June 7, 2016
Alex embraces his new role as Laura's teacher but his methods are questionable. Valerie reaches out to old friends and makes an unsettling discovery.
13	3	"Such Good Friends"	Karyn Kusama	Zander Lehmann	June 14, 2016
Valerie tries to take her friendship with fellow therapist Jennifer (Katie Aselton) to the next level. Alex considers an offer from a venture capitalist to keep Snooger from going under. Laura considers joining a homeschool study group.
14	4	"Big Green Egg"	Karyn Kusama	Harris Danow	June 21, 2016
Alex invites new investors to his house for barbecue, one of whom is engaged to Alex's ex-girlfriend, Sarah (Britt Lower). Jennifer plans to set Valerie up with one of her friends, but not all goes according to plan. Laura and Aubrey (Dylan Gelula) bond over a coffee.
15	5	"Bicycle Thieves"	Iain B. MacDonald	Zander Lehmann	June 28, 2016
Alex struggles to get along with his new business partner and receives a shocking fact about his past and Sarah from his father. Valerie considers freezing her eggs. Laura and Aubrey get high and kiss.
16	6	"100 Cows"	Iain B. MacDonald	Molly Smith Metzler	July 5, 2016
Alex wonders about the wedding gift for Sarah that can get her attention. Valerie goes out on a date with Harry, one of the friends of Jennifer. Laura and Aubrey take up a task of creating a care package for one of their classmates, Spencer (Rhenzy Feliz), who has cancer.
17	7	"Threesomes"	Lynn Shelton	Liz Tigelaar	July 12, 2016
Alex dates Fallon (Britt Robertson), Jordan's assistant, to make Sarah jealous, Fallon reveals that she's helping him because she's interested in Jordan herself. Valerie consults Jennifer about her dilemma of choosing Jack or Harry. Aubrey and Laura have a threesome with Spencer.
18	8	"The Magpie"	Lynn Shelton	Zander Lehmann	July 19, 2016
Alex, Jordan, and Sarah deal with the fall out of earlier events. Laura's growing feelings for Spencer creates problems in her relationship with Aubrey. Valerie is unsure about dealing with her feelings for Jack.
19	9	"The Lake"	Marielle Heller	Marguerite MacIntyre	July 26, 2016
Alex is served a notice for negligence by Jordan. Valerie goes to a hiking trip with Jack, but is distracted by Alex's problems. Laura continues her relationship with Spencer; Aubrey confronts her.
20	10	"Reunion"	Marielle Heller	Rosa Handelman	August 2, 2016
Alex is uncomfortable with Sarah's growing presence at his house. Jack and Valerie pretend to be a couple on their honeymoon and crash a high school reunion at the hotel. Laura grows closer to Spencer.
21	11	"Death and Taxes"	Michael Weaver	Harris Danow	August 9, 2016
Valerie and Drew file their divorce settlement papers and Valerie stalks one of her ex-patients. Alex seeks professional help for therapy. Laura and Spencer go funeral casket shopping for Spencer.
22	12	"40"	Michael Weaver	Liz Tigelaar	August 16, 2016
On Valerie's 40th birthday, Valerie and Drew rekindle their relationship. Alex tries to make up with Valerie by planning a surprise party, much to displeasure of Valerie. Spencer's trial is successful and cancer is in remission.
23	13	"The Great Unknown"	Fred Savage	Zander Lehmann	August 23, 2016
After Spencer's cancer goes into remission, Laura loses all love interest for him. Alex and Valerie's father turns up with his mind made. He's ready to die and he wants Alex's help. With the help of Valerie and Laura, they poison his drink. Valerie decides to move out of Alex's house.

=== Season 3 (2017) ===
On June 23, 2016, Hulu renewed the series for a 13-episode third season. The season premiered on May 23, 2017.

No. overall	No. in season	Title	Directed by	Written by	Original release date
24	1	"Ashes to Ashes"	Lynn Shelton	Zander Lehmann	May 23, 2017
In the wake of Charles' death, Alex and Valerie adjust to their new lives apart. Laura schemes to remove her tattoo. Dawn makes an unexpected announcement.
25	2	"Things to Do in Burbank When You're Dead"	Carrie Brownstein	Zander Lehmann	May 23, 2017
After the memorial, Alex and Valerie spend one last night roaming the streets of their old neighborhood and discussing where to scatter Charles' ashes.
26	3	"The Table"	Carrie Brownstein	Liz Tigelaar	May 23, 2017
Valerie enlists Leon's help to accept delivery of a new dining room table. Alex pitches his business idea to investors. Laura participates in a sex study.
27	4	"The Sprout"	Lake Bell	Marguerite MacIntyre	May 30, 2017
Alex reconnects with Emmy. Valerie upgrades her wardrobe before the first day of a storytelling class. Laura starts a new job collecting signatures for a ballot proposition.
28	5	"Look at Me"	Lake Bell	Harris Danow	June 6, 2017
Valerie's fling with her classmate gets more complicated than she had hoped. Laura uncovers troubling information about her ballot proposition. A date inspires Alex to consider his future.
29	6	"Troubleshooting"	Amy York Rubin	Molly Smith Metzler	June 13, 2017
Alex reacquaints himself with the demands of working full-time. Valerie catches up with Jennifer and learns an intriguing secret about Jack. Laura goes door-to-door collecting signatures, while interning for a new environmental group.
30	7	"The Rat King"	Amy York Rubin	Rosa Handelman	June 20, 2017
Rae's discovery of a rat in the bathroom sparks a hunt through Alex's house. Leon and Leia's relationship escalates.
31	8	"Venus"	Michael Weaver	Tommy Dewey and Michaela Watkins	June 27, 2017
Alex makes an unlikely friend at work while trying to unearth the identity of Valerie's brother. Laura's relationship with Casey intensifies. Valerie finds her new arrangement with Jack maddening.
32	9	"Fresno"	Michael Weaver	Marguerite MacIntyre	July 4, 2017
Valerie and Jack drive to Fresno to meet Valerie's half-brother. Laura considers whether to speak at a town council meeting. Alex's plan to impress a co-worker backfires when his house is taken over by a YouTube celebrity's photo shoot.
33	10	"Cake Walk"	Gillian Robespierre	Harris Danow	July 11, 2017
Alex searches for answers after losing his sexual prowess. Valerie obsesses over Jack's choices while planning a double date with Alex and Judy. Laura finds herself lost after a hard goodbye.
34	11	"Firesale"	Gillian Robespierre	Molly Smith Metzler and Rosa Handelman	July 18, 2017
Valerie is roped into being a bridesmaid for a wedding she thinks is ridiculous. Alex and Judy revel in their new romance. Laura raises money for a move to Sacramento.
35	12	"99"	Jason Reitman	Liz Tigelaar	July 25, 2017
It's 1999. A young Valerie and Alex prepare for an unexpected pregnancy. In present day, Laura visits Casey in Sacramento and Valerie's relationship with Jack reaches a breaking point.
36	13	"The Hermit & the Moon"	Jason Reitman	Zander Lehmann	August 1, 2017
Valerie tries to repair her relationship with Laura while confronting resentments she harbors towards Dawn. Alex resolves to embark on an epic camping trip—but is epically derailed.

=== Season 4 (2018) ===
On October 19, 2017, Hulu renewed the series for a fourth and final season with all 8 episodes being released simultaneously on July 31, 2018.

No. overall	No. in season	Title	Directed by	Written by	Original release date
37	1	"Carrie"	Gillian Robespierre	Zander Lehmann	July 31, 2018
Laura returns from a trip abroad and Valerie soon discovers that fixing their fractured relationship proves more difficult than she thought. Alex's attempts at keeping his new family order are thwarted when an unwelcome presence enters the equation.
38	2	"The Missing Piece"	Gillian Robespierre	Cara DiPaolo	July 31, 2018
A sudden death has Val questioning her life choices, while Alex struggles with Jeff's intrusion in his family. Laura finds it difficult to balance her relationship with her new career and Leon and Leia receive unexpected news.
39	3	"Virtual Reality"	Hannah Fidell	Zander Lehmann	July 31, 2018
The realities of Valerie's impulsive decision begin to take hold as Laura endures the fallout from her fight with Tathiana. Alex navigates the bizarre world of virtual dating and makes a surprising connection.
40	4	"Dreams Stay With You"	Hannah Fidell	Harris Danow	July 31, 2018
Alex embarks on a psychedelic getaway only to encounter an unpleasant figure from his past, while Valerie runs into an old flame during a night out with John. Laura maneuvers a new career opportunity around an inscrutable boss.
41	5	"The Last Super Bowl"	Zander Lehmann	Rosa Handelman	July 31, 2018
During Alex's 'Last Super Bowl' party gone awry, Valerie introduces John to the gang as Alex processes Rae's decision to move out. Laura has a chance run-in with Tathiana. Leon and Leia are at an impasse after Leia's recent revelation.
42	6	"Polytropos"	Helen Estabrook	Tess Morris	July 31, 2018
Following a day of misguided decisions, Alex, Valerie, and Laura begin their overdue pilgrimage to Dawn's. But when their road trip takes an accidental turn, each faces an obstacle that tests their willpower in different ways.
43	7	"All About You"	Michael Weaver	Nick Jones, Jr.	July 31, 2018
Alex's "first date" with Rae goes less smoothly than planned, while a stubborn John tries Val's patience. Laura returns to Tathiana with a newfound resolve, and Leon and Leia begin the process of mediation.
44	8	"Finale"	Michael Weaver	Zander Lehmann	July 31, 2018
Alex and Valerie grapple with Dawn's unexpected death, then put big life decisions on hold to go on a double date. Laura finds clarity in her love life. After Leia admits to Leon she can't and won't be without him no matter what, they reconcile. So do Laura and Tathiana--after Laura receives a job suggestion from a former colleague leaving the chaotically-run restaurant Laura quit. Alex finally departs for Austin to be with Rae.

== Reception ==
The first season received critical acclaim. On Metacritic the first season holds a rating of 77 out of 100 based on twenty critics’ reviews. Rotten Tomatoes gave the first season a 93% rating based on twenty-eight critics’ reviews, with the critical consensus reading, "Jason Reitman's Casual is a funny -- albeit very specific -- look at modern dating, sharpened by edgy dialogue and self-assured performances." For the 73rd Golden Globe Awards, the series was nominated in the category for Best Television Series - Musical or Comedy.

The second season received similar acclaim. It holds an 87% approval rating on review aggregator website Rotten Tomatoes, based on fifteen reviews, with an average rating of 8.8/10. The site's critical consensus reads, "Well-written and solidly acted, Casual offers a profane -- yet profound -- take on life's many challenges". On Metacritic, the season holds a rating of 88 out of 100, based on seven critics. The third season also has a critics' rating of 88%.

== See also ==
- List of original programs distributed by Hulu
