= Guru Jagat =

American yoga instructor (1979–2021)

- Born: Katie Griggs; August 30, 1979; Fort Collins, Colorado
- Died: August 1, 2021 (aged 41); Venice, Los Angeles
- Education: Antioch College
- Occupation: Yoga instructor
- Years active: 2013–2021
- Organization: Ra Ma Institute

Katie Griggs (August 30, 1979 – August 1, 2021), professionally known as Guru Jagat, was an American Kundalini yoga teacher, podcaster, author, and the owner of both a fashion brand and record label.

She was noted for sharing conspiracy theories and interviewing conspiracy theorists on her podcast.

== Early life and education ==
Katie Griggs was born in the summer of 1979 in Fort Collins, Colorado. Her mother was a farmer and a therapeutic clown, and brought her up surrounded by New Age teachings.

Before adopting the Guru Jagat moniker, she also used the aliases Athena Day, Katie Day, and Kundalini Katie. After initially dropping out of school, she obtained a degree from Antioch College. She studied Kundalini yoga in New Mexico under the mentorship of Harbhajan Singh Khalsa (Yogi Bhajan).

== Career and views ==
Griggs was the owner-operator of Kundalini yoga studio the Ra Ma Institute, located on Lincoln Boulevard in Venice, Los Angeles, which opened in 2013. Her clients included actor Kate Hudson, singer Alicia Keys, and actors Kelly Rutherford, Demi Moore, and Laura Dern. She opened her second yoga studio in Boulder, Colorado in the summer of 2014.

Griggs operated the podcast Reality Riffing with Guru Jagat. During the COVID-19 pandemic, she used her podcast to share conspiracy theories about COVID-19 being spread by chemtrails and artificial intelligence taking over. On the podcast she interviewed conspiracy theorist Arthur Firstenberg and conspiracy theorist and antisemite David Icke. Griggs did not follow California's public health rules during the pandemic and refused COVID-19 vaccines.

Griggs used social media to share supportive statements about her mentor, the late Harbhajan Singh Khalsa, more popularly known as Yogi Bhajan, who was accused of rape, child abuse, and financial impropriety. Griggs also shared QAnon conspiracy theories, including the Pizzagate conspiracy theory. In 2021, two former employees of Griggs accused her of running Ra Ma Institute as a cult, and calling a Black Lives Matter supporter a "cockroach".

Griggs owned the clothing line Robotic Disaster and the record label RA MA Records.

== Invincible Living (book) ==
In 2017, Harper Elixir published Griggs' book Invincible Living: The Power of Yoga, The Energy of Breath and Other Tools for a Radiant Life (ISBN 978-0062414984.) Invincible Living includes lessons previously shared by Griggs via her media outlet RA MA Media on the topic of Kundalini yoga. The illustrated book includes instruction on simple breathing and moving exercises as well as lifestyle and wellness advice. The book includes advice that claims to increase metabolism, improve mood, increase creativity, reduce stress, and slow aging. It also provides advice on financial prosperity and improving readers' sex lives.

== Personal life and death ==
Griggs married husband Teg Nam in a Sikh ceremony in Scotland in 2019.

Griggs died on August 1, 2021, at the age of 41. She died of a cardiac arrest caused by a pulmonary embolism following surgery on her left ankle. She is buried in the Hollywood Forever Cemetery.

== Legacy ==
HBO Max produced a documentary-series about her life called Breath of Fire, titled after one of the breathing techniques used in Kundalini yoga. It premiered on October 23, 2024, on HBO. LAist featured Griggs' story in season four of their Imperfect Paradise (podcast).

== See also ==
- Yoga in the United States
- Sexual abuse by yoga gurus
