= Yogi Tea =

American tea brand

- US logo of Yogi Tea
- Type: Private
- Industry: Beverage
- Founded: 1984
- Headquarters: Portland and Eugene, Oregon, U.S. and Hamburg, Germany
- Products: Tea/herbal infusions
- Number of employees: c. 325
- Website: yogitea.com yogiproducts.com

Yogi Tea is an American brand offering organic herbal, green and black tea blends. The company is privately held and operated in North America by East West Tea Company, LLC and YOGI TEA GmbH for Europe.

== History ==
Yogi Tea was established in 1973. Yogi Bhajan, a Kundalini yoga instructor influenced the original tea blend recipe, which is based on Ayurvedic medicine, that consists of cinnamon, cardamom, ginger, cloves and black pepper. East West Tea Company, LLC currently owns Yogi Tea.

== U.S. operations ==
In 2018, the brand moved its American manufacturing operations from Springfield, Oregon, to a new LEED-certified facility in Eugene, Oregon. The brand also has a satellite sales and marketing office in Portland, Oregon. Yogi Tea is a sponsor of NPR programs.

== European operations ==
Yogi Tea's European logo

In Europe, the company manufactures in Imola, Italy, and has offices in Hamburg, Germany. In Europe, the company name is YOGI TEA GmbH.
