= Tara Lynne Barr =

American actress (born 1993)

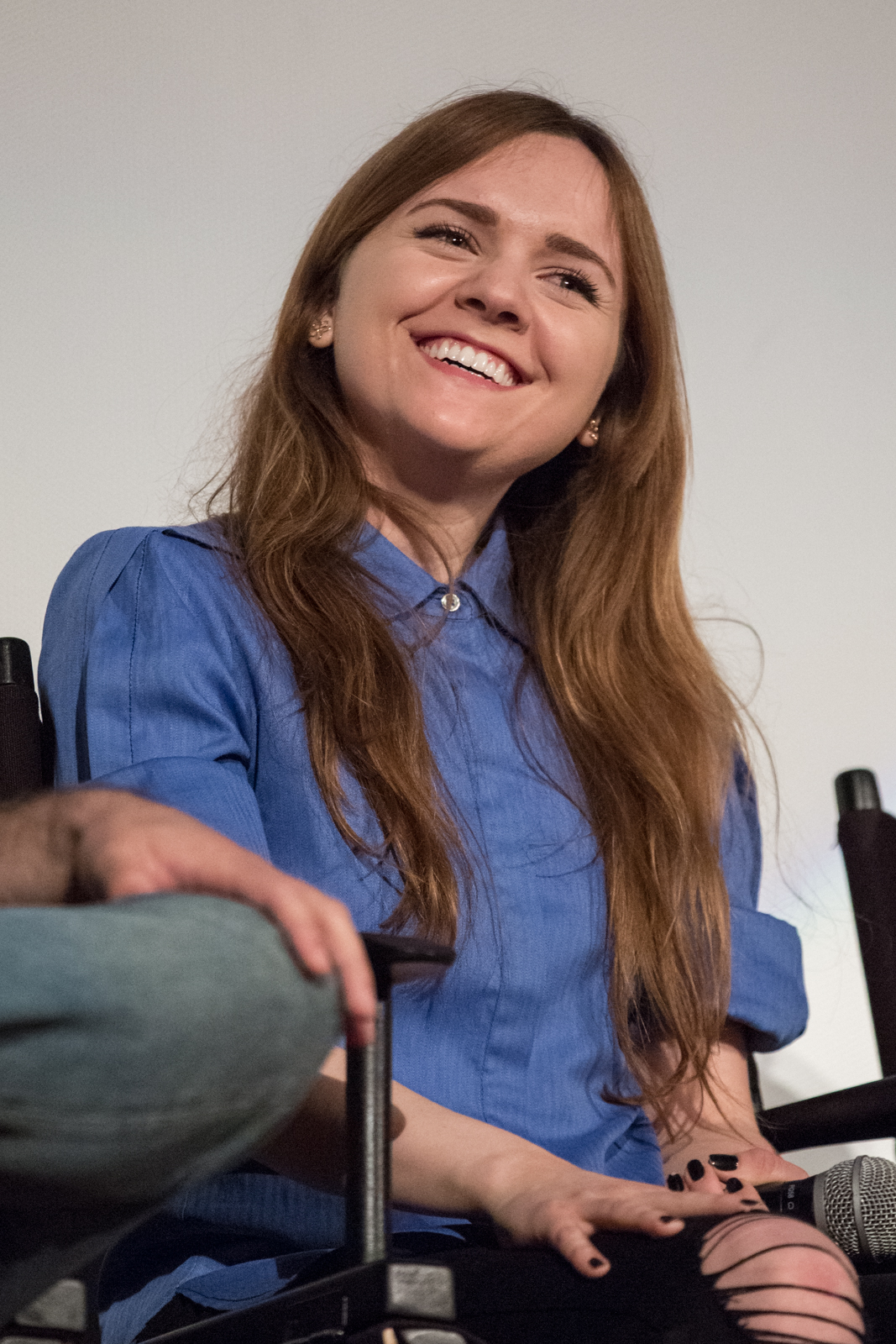
- Barr in 2016
- Born: October 2, 1993 (age 32); Orange County, California, U.S.
- Occupation: Actress
- Years active: 2003–present
- Website: www.taralynnebarr.com

Tara Lynne Barr (born October 2, 1993) is an American actress. She is best known for portraying Roxy in the dark comedy film God Bless America (2011), which earned her a Young Artist Award nomination for Best Leading Young Actress in a Feature Film, and Laura Meyers in the Hulu comedy-drama series Casual.

== Early life ==
Barr was born in Orange County, California, on October 2, 1993, and was raised in Fountain Valley, California. The daughter of long-time employees of Southern California Edison Company, her parents enrolled Barr and her older sister in the before- and after-school care program of the Boys & Girls Clubs of Huntington Valley. When the club began its Clubhouse Theater program, Barr's sister performed in several children's theater productions, inspiring Barr to take up acting. She was seven years old. Barr attended Fountain Valley public schools, and graduated from Fountain Valley High School in 2011. She was accepted to Chapman University's College of Performing Arts on the Dean's Scholarship, but left the school after a year to focus solely on her career.

== Career ==
Barr performed in local children's theater productions until, at the age of 10, she began to express interest in film and television work. Shortly thereafter she obtained an agent and started working professionally. At the age of 11, she starred in the short dark comedy film Road Kill, which won the Audience Choice Award at the 2005 New York City Horror Film Festival. While still not yet in her teens, she appeared as the host of Encore Channel's Fear Fest: 31 Nights of Horror, as well as in television series such as Joan of Arcadia, Crossing Jordan, Drake & Josh, Zoey 101, and The Suite Life of Zack & Cody.

After her high school graduation in 2011, Barr starred in the dark comedy film God Bless America, her break out role. Following this, Barr starred as the title role in the short film Dawn, Rose McGowan's directorial debut. This was followed by a major recurring role on the NBC series, Aquarius, starring David Duchovny, in which Barr portrayed the character Katie, who was based on real-life Manson Family member Patricia Krenwinkel. Barr left the series before its second season to star in the Hulu original series, Casual, as Laura Meyers. Casual aired for four seasons from 2015 to 2018. Barr was praised for her performance.

In 2020, Barr was cast in the AMC series Dispatches From Elsewhere to portray the young version of star Sally Field's character.

== Filmography ==
=== Film ===
| Year | Title | Role | Notes |
|---|---|---|---|
| 2005 | Rebound | Student | Uncredited |
| 2011 | God Bless America | Roxy | |
| 2014 | Dawn | Dawn | |
| 2016 | The Darkness | Kat | |

=== Television ===
| Year | Title | Role | Notes |
|---|---|---|---|
| 2004 | Joan of Arcadia | Jumping-Rope Girl | Episode: "Only Connect" |
| 2005 | Crossing Jordan | Sally Yates | Episode: "Murder in the Rue Morgue" |
| 2006 | Drake & Josh | Katie | Episode: "Megan's New Teacher" |
| 2006 | Zoey 101 | Sandy Baldwin | Episode: "Lola Likes Chase" |
| 2007–2008 | The Suite Life of Zack & Cody | Haley Grille | 2 episodes |
| 2007 | Disney Channel's 3 Minute Game Show | Herself | Episode: "High School Musical 2 Edition" |
| 2012 | The Bold and the Beautiful | Christine Johnson | |
| 2015 | Aquarius | Katie | 10 episodes |
| 2015–2018 | Casual | Laura Meyers | Series regular (44 episodes) |
| 2018 | Bobcat Goldthwait's Misfits & Monsters | Regina Bailey | Episode: "Face In The Car Lot" |
| 2018 | Co-ed | Ginny | Series regular (8 episodes) |
| 2020 | Dispatches From Elsewhere | Young Janice | 6 episodes |
| 2021 | Red Bird Lane | Rose | Series regular (unaired pilot) |

=== Video games ===
| Year | Title | Role | Notes |
|---|---|---|---|
| 2012 | The Secret World | Carter / Emilia | Voice |
| 2012 | Prototype 2 | Amaya Heller | Voice/Motion Capture |
| 2020 | Twin Mirror | Kayla | Voice |
| 2025 | Dune: Awakening | Ariste Atreides | Voice |
| 2025 | The Outer Worlds 2 | Various | Voice |

=== Audio ===
| Year | Title | Role | Notes |
|---|---|---|---|
| 2013 | A Midsummer Night's Dream | Hermia | L.A. Theatre Works / Audio Theatre Collection |
| 2013 | The Liar (Corneille) | Clarice | L.A. Theatre Works |
| 2013 | The Columnist | Abigail | L.A. Theatre Works |
| 2014 | August: Osage County | Jean Fordham | L.A. Theatre Works |
| 2018 | Stiff Upper Lip, Jeeves | Emerald Stoker | BBC Radio |
| 2019 | Please Continue | Margaret Hopson | L.A. Theatre Works |
| 2019 | Three Women (book) by Lisa Taddeo | Maggie Wilkin | Simon & Schuster Audio |
| 2022 | The Candy House by Jennifer Egan | Molly | Simon & Schuster Audio |
| 2022 | Twelfth Night | Olivia | L.A. Theatre Works |
| 2022 | Once Upon a Time in Nazi Occupied Tunisia | Loys | L.A. Theatre Works |
| 2025 | Circumstances Affecting the Heat of the Sun's Rays | Augusta Foote | L.A. Theatre Works |

== Awards and nominations ==
| Year | Award | Category | Work | Result | Ref. |
|---|---|---|---|---|---|
| 2013 | 34th Young Artist Awards | Best Performance in a Feature Film – Leading Young Actress | God Bless America | Nominated | |
| 2024 | Audie Award | Audio Drama | Once Upon a Time in Nazi Occupied Tunisia | Nominated | |
