= Helen Estabrook =

American film producer

- Education: Harvard College
- Occupation: Businesswoman

Helen Estabrook (born 1983) is an American film and television producer and executive. She is global head of film & television at Condé Nast Entertainment (CNE).

== Early life and education ==
Estabrook grew up in Champaign, Illinois. She attended University Laboratory High School after 6th grade. At the age of 16, she attended Harvard College where she studied sociology, graduating in 2003. As an undergraduate, Estabrook took film courses before entering the field of film production.

== Career ==
She worked in New York City as a production assistant and as an agency assistant before moving to Los Angeles.

She ran her own company, A Thousand Ships, and had 2-year first-look TV development deals with Hulu from September 2016 to 2018, and HBO from October 2018 to 2020. Estabrook started her work in television with Hulu's series Casual, developed The Front Runner (2018), Up In The Air, Jeff, Who Lives at Home, Demolition, Young Adult, and Tully. Her last independent series before moving to a studio position was as executive producer of the limited series Mrs. Fletcher for HBO. Her position with CNE was announced March 2021.

She is known for producing the film Whiplash (2014), which earned her a nomination for Academy Award for Best Picture at the 87th ceremony.
