= Yogi Bhajan =

American Sikh yogi (1929–2004)

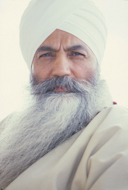
- In 1985
- Born: Harbhajan Singh Puri; August 26, 1929; Kot Harkarn, Punjab, British India
- Died: October 6, 2004 (aged 75); Española, New Mexico, United States
- Citizenship: India (1929–1976); United States (1976–2004)
- Education: Panjab University, New Delhi, India (Master of Economics, 1952), University for Humanistic Studies, Solana Beach, CA, USA (PhD, Psychology of Communication, 1980)
- Organizations: Healthy, Happy, Holy Organization (3HO), Sikh Dharma International, Kundalini Research Institute, Siri Singh Sahib Corporation
- Known for: Alleged serial sexual assault and abuse, promoting Kundalini yoga, Sikh missionary activities
- Title: Yogi, Siri Singh Sahib, Bhai Sahib, Panth Rattan
- Spouse: Bibi Inderjit Kaur
- Children: Ranbir Singh, Kulbir Singh, Kamaljit Kaur

Yogi Bhajan (born Harbhajan Singh Puri) (August 26, 1929 – October 6, 2004), also known as Siri Singh Sahib to his followers, was an American entrepreneur, yoga guru, and putative spiritual teacher. He introduced his version of Kundalini yoga to the United States. He was the spiritual director of the 3HO (Healthy, Happy, Holy Organization) foundation (and business ventures), with over 300 centers in 35 countries. He was accused of sexual abuse by several dozen of his female followers; an investigation called the Olive Branch Report found the allegations most likely true.

== Biography ==
=== Early life ===
Harbhajan Singh Khalsa was born on August 26, 1929, into a Sikh family in Kot Harkarn, Gujranwala district in the province of Punjab (now in Pakistan). His father, Dr. Kartar Singh Puri, served the British Raj as a medical doctor. His mother was named Harkrishan Kaur. His father was raised in the Sikh tradition and young Harbhajan was educated in a Catholic school run by nuns. Singh learned the fundamentals of Sikhism from his paternal grandfather, Sant Bhai Fateh Singh. Theirs was a well-to-do landlord family, owning most of their village in the foothills of the Himalayas.

Singh's schooling was interrupted in 1947 by the violent partition of India, when he and his family fled to New Delhi as refugees. There, Harbhajan Singh attended Camp College – a hastily put together arrangement for thousands of refugee students – and was an active member of the Sikh Students Federation in Delhi. Four years later, he graduated with a master's degree in economics.

In 1953, Singh entered the service of the Government of India. He served in the Revenue Department, where his duties took him all over India. Eventually, Harbhajan Singh was promoted to a customs inspector at Delhi Airport.

In his final years in India, he also learned from Baba Virsa Singh at Gobind Sadan Institute.

In 1968, Singh emigrated to Toronto, Canada equipped with an endorsement from that country's High Commissioner to India, James George, who was also a student of his. Harbhajan Singh made a considerable impact in the predominantly Anglo-Saxon metropolis. In three months, he established classes at several YMCAs, co-founded a yoga centre, was interviewed for national press and television, and helped set in motion the creation of eastern Canada's first Sikh temple in time for Guru Nanak's five hundredth birthday the following year.

=== Healthy, Happy, Holy Organization ===
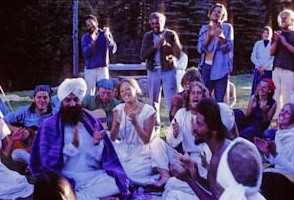
1970 gathering at Santa Clara Canyon, New Mexico

In 1969, Singh established the 3HO (Healthy, Happy, Holy Organization) Foundation in Los Angeles, California to further his missionary work. His brand of Sikhism appealed to the hippies who formed the bulk of his early converts. The Sikh practice of not cutting one's hair or beard was already accepted by the hippie culture. Singh encouraged vegetarianism even though Sikhs are traditionally meat eaters. Singh called the hippie youth 'searching souls' who wanted to experience elevated states of awareness and wanted to feel they were contributing to a world of peace and social justice. He offered them all these things with vigorous yoga, an embracing holistic vision, and an optimistic spirit of sublime destiny. Interest in yoga increased worldwide at this time. To serve the changing times, Singh created the International Kundalini Yoga Teachers Association, dedicated to setting standards for teachers and the propagation of the teachings.

In 1994, the 3HO Foundation joined the United Nations as a non-governmental organization in consultative status with the Economic and Social Council, representing women's issues, promoting human rights, and providing education about alternative systems of medicine.

=== Other activities ===
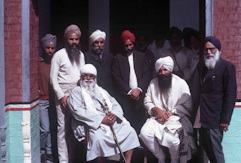
With Sant Fateh Singh 1971

Singh incorporated the storyline of the dawning new age into his teachings, a case of melding Western astrology with Sikh tradition. He proclaimed that "Guru Nanak was the Guru for the Aquarian Age." It was, he declared, to be an age where people first experienced God, then believed, rather than the old way of believing and then being liberated by one's faith.

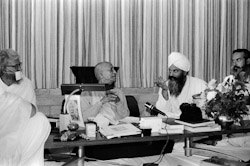
With A.C. Bhaktivedanta Swami Prabhupada and Sushil Kumar (Jain monk), San Francisco 1975

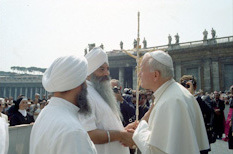
Meeting Pope John Paul II at the Vatican, 1984

In the summer of 1970, Singh participated in an informal "Holy Man Jam" at the University of Colorado at Boulder with Swami Satchidananda (another Eastern yogi who has been accused of sexual abuse of his students), Stephen Gaskin of The Farm in Tennessee, Zen Buddhist Jakusho Kwong, and other local spiritual leaders. A few weeks later, he organized a gathering of spiritual teachers to engage and inspire the 200,000 attendees of the Atlanta International Pop Festival on the stage between the performances of the bands.

When U.S. President Nixon called drugs America's "Number one domestic problem", Singh launched a pilot program with two longtime heroin addicts in Washington, D.C., in 1972. The program attempted to treat heroin addiction through the practice of yoga and the consumption of garlic juice.

In 1984 he started the Yogi Tea brand.

=== Death ===
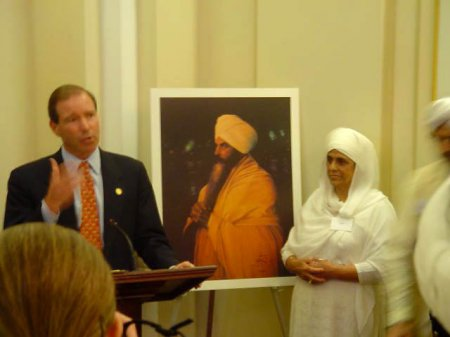
Congressman Tom Udall with Harbhajan Singh Khalsa's widow, "Bibiji"

Harbhajan Singh died of complications of heart failure at his home in Española, New Mexico, on October 6, 2004, aged 75. He was survived by his wife, sons, daughter and five grandchildren. Obituaries appeared in The Los Angeles Times, the Times of India, The New York Times, and Yoga Journal. Khalsa's passing was noted by the Shiromani Gurdwara Parbandhak Committee, which closed its offices to commemorate his death.

The State of New Mexico honoured him by renaming State Highway 106 as the Yogi Bhajan Memorial Highway. The New Mexico Government flew its flags at half-mast for two days (Oct 7–8) in his honour after his death on Oct 6, and declared Oct 23 "Yogi Bhajan Memorial Day".

== Allegations of sexual abuse ==
In 2019, Yogi Bhajan's former secretary Pamela Saharah Dyson published the book Premka: White Bird in a Golden Cage: My Life with Yogi Bhajan, reporting that she and other women had abusive sexual relationships with Harbhajan Singh.

In March 2020, the Siri Singh Sahib Corporation commissioned An Olive Branch (AOB) to look into allegations of sexual abuse and rape of female followers and assistants. The AOB report, published in August, found that it was "more likely than not" that Yogi Bhajan raped three women, injured eight women during sex, engaged in nonconsensual touching of nine people, showed pornography to minors, used sexually offensive language, directed women to shave their pubic hair, and directed women to have sex with other women, that his followers' claims that he was celibate were inaccurate, and that he "employed a variety of methods to control his students including compartmentalization, quid pro quo, promises, threats, slander, phone calls, guarding, and/or telling women they were his wife."

The report acknowledged "the convictions of Yogi Bhajan's Supporters as accurate representations of their beliefs" rather than deliberate falsehoods. Soon after, other media published stories based on the report that considered the allegations to be true.

== Reception ==
=== Media coverage ===
In 1977, Time published a critical article, titled "Yogi Bhajan's Synthetic Sikhism". The article alleged that Gurucharan Singh Tohra, former President of the Shiromani Gurdwara Parbandhak Committee (SGPC), had stated that Harbhajan Singh is not the leader of Sikhism in the Western World as he claimed, and that Tohra had denied the SGPC had ever given Singh the title of Siri Singh Sahib.

Harbhajan Singh is featured in books discussing the successes of Sikhs who migrated from India to the West, including Surjit Kaur's Among the Sikhs: Reaching for the Stars. and Gurmukh Singh's The Global Indian: The Sikhs.

=== Scholars' views ===
Scholars including Verne A. Dusenbery and Pashaura Singh have concurred that Harbhajan Singh's introduction of Sikh teachings into the West helped identify Sikhism as a world religion while at the same time creating a compelling counter-narrative to that which identified Sikhs solely as a race with a shared history in India.

Philip Deslippe, a historian of American religion, wrote a 2012 article "From Maharaj to Mahan Tantric: The Construction of Yogi Bhajan's Kundalini Yoga", using 3HO source archive material and news articles to reveal how Harbhajan Singh recreated his own story after his first trip back to India:

I set out to answer the question "where did Kundalini Yoga as taught by Yogi Bhajan (KYATBYB) come from?" and not much else. I tried to support my findings with as much evidence as possible, and for that evidence to be as clear, specific, verifiable, and close to the source, such as interviews with first hand witnesses (Pamela being one of them), quotes from Yogi Bhajan, contemporary newspaper accounts, and exercises taken from manuals. I concluded that in the early years of 3HO, Yogi Bhajan was using the physical yoga of Swami Dhirendra Brahmachari and the persona and mantra of Baba Virsa Singh, and that the figure of Sant Hazara Singh only became prominent after the first trip to India in 1970-1971 when Yogi Bhajan had a falling out with Virsa Singh.

— Philip Deslippe

=== Television ===
In 2024, HBO ran the series Breath of Fire, which explores Yogi Bhajan's mental and sexual abuse of his followers.
