= Background Briefing =

Background Briefing may refer to:

- Background Briefing, an Australian broadcast on the Radio National network
- Background Briefing, an American broadcast hosted by Ian Masters on the Pacifica Radio network
