= Primetime Emmy Award for Outstanding Supporting Actress in a Drama Series =

Primetime Emmy Award

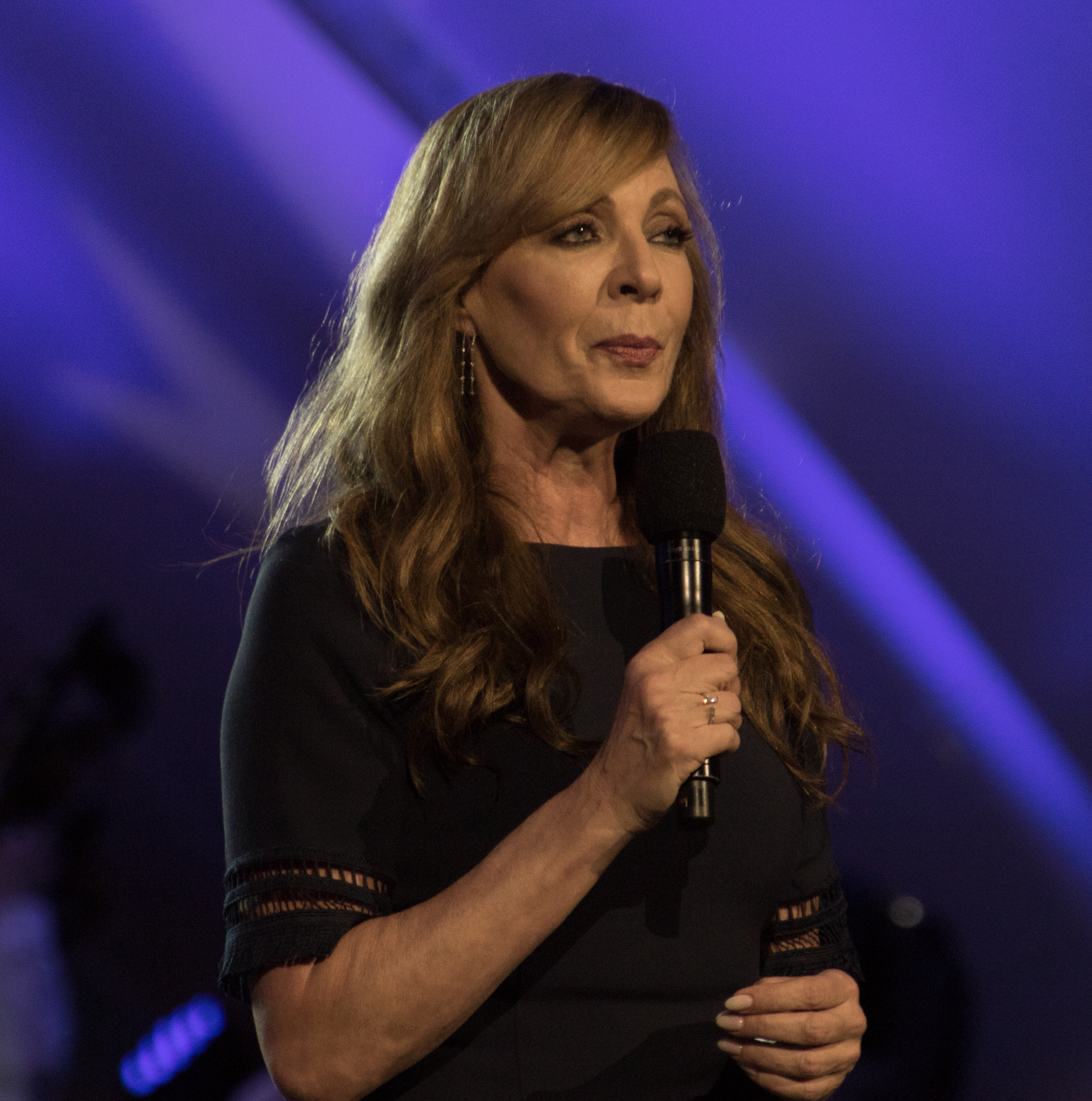
- The 2026 recipient: Allison Janney
- Awarded for: Outstanding Supporting Actress in a Drama Series
- Country: United States
- Presented by: Academy of Television Arts & Sciences
- First award: 1954
- Currently held by: Allison Janney, The Diplomat (2026)
- Website: emmys.com

The Primetime Emmy Award for Outstanding Supporting Actress in a Drama Series is an award presented by the Academy of Television Arts & Sciences (ATAS). In early Primetime Emmy Award ceremonies, the supporting categories were not always genre-, or even gender-, specific. Beginning with 1970, supporting actresses in drama have competed alone. However, these dramatic performances often included actresses from miniseries, telefilms, and guest performers competing against main cast competitors. Such instances are marked below:

- # – Indicates a performance in a miniseries or television film, prior to the category's creation in 1975
- § – Indicates a performance as a guest performer, prior to the category's creation in 1975

== Winners and nominations ==
=== 1950s ===
Year	Actress	Role	Program	Network
Best Series Supporting Actress
1954 (6th) (Note: Early Emmy ceremonies did not have genre-specific acting categories)
1954 (6th)	Vivian Vance	Ethel Mertz	I Love Lucy	CBS
1954 (6th)	Bea Benaderet	Blanche Morton	The George Burns and Gracie Allen Show	CBS
1954 (6th)	Ruth Gilbert	Various Characters	The Milton Berle Show	NBC
1954 (6th)	Marion Lorne	Mrs. Gurney	Mister Peepers	NBC
1954 (6th)	Audrey Meadows	Alice Kramden	The Jackie Gleason Show	CBS
Best Supporting Actress in a Regular Series
1955 (7th)
1955 (7th)	Audrey Meadows	Alice Kramden	The Jackie Gleason Show	CBS
1955 (7th)	Bea Benaderet	Blanche Morton	The George Burns and Gracie Allen Show	CBS
1955 (7th)	Jean Hagen	Margaret Williams	Make Room for Daddy	ABC
1955 (7th)	Marion Lorne	Mrs. Gurney	Mister Peepers	NBC
1955 (7th)	Vivian Vance	Ethel Mertz	I Love Lucy	CBS
Best Actress in a Supporting Role
1956 (8th)
1956 (8th)	Nanette Fabray	Various Characters	Caesar's Hour	NBC
1956 (8th)	Ann B. Davis	Charmaine Schultz	The Bob Cummings Show	CBS
1956 (8th)	Jean Hagen	Margaret Williams	Make Room for Daddy	ABC
1956 (8th)	Audrey Meadows	Alice Kramden	The Honeymooners	CBS
1956 (8th)	Thelma Ritter #	Aggie Hurley	Alcoa-Goodyear Playhouse	NBC
Best Supporting Performance by an Actress
1957 (9th)
1957 (9th)	Pat Carroll	Various Characters	Caesar's Hour	NBC
1957 (9th)	Ann B. Davis	Charmaine Schultz	The Bob Cummings Show	CBS
1957 (9th)	Audrey Meadows	Various Characters	The Jackie Gleason Show	CBS
1957 (9th)	Mildred Natwick #	Madame Arcati	Ford Star Jubilee	CBS
1957 (9th)	Vivian Vance	Ethel Mertz	I Love Lucy	CBS
Best Continuing Supporting Performance by an Actress in a Dramatic or Comedy Series
1958 (10th)
1958 (10th)	Ann B. Davis	Charmaine Schultz	The Bob Cummings Show	CBS & NBC
1958 (10th)	Pat Carroll	Various Characters	Caesar's Hour	NBC
1958 (10th)	Marion Lorne	Myrtle Banford	Sally	NBC
1958 (10th)	Verna Felton	Hilda Crocker	December Bride	CBS
1958 (10th)	Vivian Vance	Ethel Mertz	I Love Lucy	CBS
Best Supporting Actress (Continuing Character) in a Dramatic Series
1959 (11th)
1959 (11th)	Barbara Hale	Della Street	Perry Mason	CBS
1959 (11th)	Lola Albright	Edie Hart	Peter Gunn	NBC
1959 (11th)	Amanda Blake	Kitty	Gunsmoke	CBS
1959 (11th)	Hope Emerson	Mother	Peter Gunn	NBC

=== 1960s ===
Year	Actress	Role	Program	Network
Outstanding Performance by an Actress in a Series (Lead or Support)
1960 (12th)	Jane Wyatt	Margaret Anderson	Father Knows Best	CBS
1960 (12th)	Donna Reed	Donna Stone	The Donna Reed Show	ABC
1960 (12th)	Teresa Wright	Margaret Bourke-White	NBC Sunday Showcase	NBC
1960 (12th)	Loretta Young	Various Characters	The Loretta Young Show	NBC
Outstanding Performance in a Supporting Role by an Actor or Actress in a Series
1961 (13th)
1961 (13th)	Don Knotts	Barney Fife	The Andy Griffith Show	CBS
1961 (13th)	Abby Dalton	Lt. Martha Hale	Hennesey	CBS
1961 (13th)	Barbara Hale	Della Street	Perry Mason	CBS
Outstanding Performance in a Supporting Role by an Actress
1962 (14th)
1962 (14th)	Pamela Brown #	Princess Victoria of Saxe-Coburg-Saalfeld	Hallmark Hall of Fame	NBC
1962 (14th)	Jeanne Cooper §	Anna Medalle	Ben Casey	ABC
1962 (14th)	Colleen Dewhurst #	Gertrude Hart	Focus	NBC
1962 (14th)	Joan Hackett §	Ellen Parker	Ben Casey	ABC
1962 (14th)	Mary Wickes	Maxfield	The Gertrude Berg Show	CBS
1963 (15th)
1963 (15th)	Glenda Farrell §	Martha Morrison	Ben Casey	ABC
1963 (15th)	Davey Davison §	Laura Hunter	The Eleventh Hour	NBC
1963 (15th)	Nancy Malone	Libby Kingston	Naked City	ABC
1963 (15th)	Rose Marie	Sally Rogers	The Dick Van Dyke Show	CBS
1963 (15th)	Kate Reid #	Queen Victoria	Hallmark Hall of Fame	NBC
1964 (16th)
1964 (16th)	Ruth White #	Shelagh Mangan	Hallmark Hall of Fame	NBC
1964 (16th)	Martine Bartlett §	Miranda Ledoux Porter	Arrest and Trial	ABC
1964 (16th)	Anjanette Comer §	Annabelle Selinsky	Arrest and Trial	ABC
1964 (16th)	Rose Marie	Sally Rogers	The Dick Van Dyke Show	CBS
1964 (16th)	Claudia McNeil §	Mrs. Hill	The Nurses	CBS
Outstanding Individual Achievements in Entertainment - Actors and Performers
1965 (17th)
1965 (17th)	Leonard Bernstein	Conductor	New York Philharmonic Young People's Concerts with Leonard Bernstein	CBS
1965 (17th)	Lynn Fontanne	Fanny Bowditch Holmes	Hallmark Hall of Fame: "The Magnificent Yankee"	NBC
1965 (17th)	Alfred Lunt	Oliver Wendell Holmes	Hallmark Hall of Fame: "The Magnificent Yankee"	NBC
1965 (17th)	Barbra Streisand	Herself	My Name Is Barbra	CBS
1965 (17th)	Dick Van Dyke	Rob Petrie	The Dick Van Dyke Show	CBS
1965 (17th)	Julie Andrews	Herself	The Andy Williams Show	NBC
1965 (17th)	Johnny Carson	Himself	The Tonight Show Starring Johnny Carson	NBC
1965 (17th)	Gladys Cooper	Margaret St. Clair	The Rogues	NBC
1965 (17th)	Robert Coote	Timmy St. Clair	The Rogues	NBC
1965 (17th)	Richard Crenna	James Slattery	Slattery's People	CBS
1965 (17th)	Julie Harris	Florence Nightingale	Hallmark Hall of Fame: "The Holy Terror"	NBC
1965 (17th)	Bob Hope	Himself	Chrysler Presents A Bob Hope Comedy Special	NBC
1965 (17th)	Dean Jagger	Principal Albert Vane	Mr. Novak	NBC
1965 (17th)	Danny Kaye	Himself	The Danny Kaye Show	CBS
1965 (17th)	David McCallum	Illya Kuryakin	The Man from U.N.C.L.E.	NBC
1965 (17th)	Red Skelton	Himself	The Red Skelton Hour	CBS
Outstanding Performance by an Actress in a Supporting Role in a Drama Series
1966 (18th)
1966 (18th)	Lee Grant	Stella Chernak	Peyton Place	ABC
1966 (18th)	Diane Baker #	Rachel Brown	Hallmark Hall of Fame	NBC
1966 (18th)	Pamela Franklin #	Betsy Balcombe	Hallmark Hall of Fame	NBC
1966 (18th)	Jeanette Nolan §	Helen Robinson	I Spy	NBC
1967 (19th)
1967 (19th)	Agnes Moorehead §	Emma Valentine	The Wild Wild West	CBS
1967 (19th)	Tina Chen #	Vietnamese Girl	CBS Playhouse	CBS
1967 (19th)	Ruth Warrick	Hannah Cord	Peyton Place	ABC
1968 (20th)
1968 (20th)	Barbara Anderson	Officer Eve Whitfield	Ironside	NBC
1968 (20th)	Linda Cristal	Victoria Cannon	The High Chaparral	NBC
1968 (20th)	Tessie O'Shea #	Tessie O'Toole	The Strange Case of Dr. Jekyll and Mr. Hyde	ABC
Outstanding Continued Performance by an Actress in a Supporting Role in a Series
1969 (21st)
1969 (21st)	Susan Saint James	Peggy Maxwell	The Name of the Game	NBC
1969 (21st)	Barbara Anderson	Officer Eve Whitfield	Ironside	NBC
1969 (21st)	Agnes Moorehead	Endora	Bewitched	ABC

=== 1970s ===
Year	Actress	Role	Program	Network
Outstanding Performance by an Actress in a Supporting Role in Drama
1970 (22nd)
1970 (22nd)	Gail Fisher	Peggy Fair	Mannix	CBS
1970 (22nd)	Barbara Anderson	Officer Eve Whitfield	Ironside	NBC
1970 (22nd)	Susan Saint James	Peggy Maxwell	The Name of the Game	NBC
1971 (23rd)
1971 (23rd)	Margaret Leighton #	Gertrude	Hamlet: Hallmark Hall of Fame	NBC
1971 (23rd)	Gail Fisher	Peggy Fair	Mannix	CBS
1971 (23rd)	Susan Saint James	Peggy Maxwell	The Name of the Game	NBC
1971 (23rd)	Elena Verdugo	Consuelo Lopez	Marcus Welby, M.D.	ABC
1972 (24th)
1972 (24th)	Jenny Agutter #	Frith	The Snow Goose: Hallmark Hall of Fame	NBC
1972 (24th)	Gail Fisher	Peggy Fair	Mannix	CBS
1972 (24th)	Elena Verdugo	Consuelo Lopez	Marcus Welby, M.D.	ABC
1973 (25th)
1973 (25th)	Ellen Corby	Esther Walton	The Waltons	CBS
1973 (25th)	Gail Fisher	Peggy Fair	Mannix	CBS
1973 (25th)	Nancy Walker	Mildred	McMillan & Wife	NBC
Best Supporting Actress in Drama
1974 (26th)
1974 (26th)	Joanna Miles #	Laura Wingfield	The Glass Menagerie	ABC
1974 (26th)	Ellen Corby	Esther Walton	The Waltons	CBS
1974 (26th)	Nancy Walker	Mildred	McMillan & Wife	NBC
Outstanding Continuing Performance by a Supporting Actress in a Drama Series
1975 (27th)
1975 (27th)	Ellen Corby	Esther Walton	The Waltons	CBS
1975 (27th)	Angela Baddeley	Mrs. Bridges	Upstairs, Downstairs	PBS
1975 (27th)	Nancy Walker	Mildred	McMillan & Wife	NBC
1976 (28th)
1976 (28th)	Ellen Corby	Esther Walton	The Waltons	CBS
1976 (28th)	Angela Baddeley	Mrs. Bridges	Upstairs, Downstairs	PBS
1976 (28th)	Susan Howard	Maggie Petrocelli	Petrocelli	NBC
1976 (28th)	Dorothy McGuire #	Mary Jordache	Rich Man, Poor Man	ABC
1976 (28th)	Sada Thompson #	Mary Todd Lincoln	Sandburg's Lincoln	NBC
1977 (29th)
1977 (29th)	Kristy McNichol	Letitia "Buddy" Lawrence	Family	ABC
1977 (29th)	Meredith Baxter	Nancy Lawrence Maitland	Family	ABC
1977 (29th)	Ellen Corby	Esther Walton	The Waltons	CBS
1977 (29th)	Lee Meriwether	Betty Jones	Barnaby Jones	CBS
1977 (29th)	Jacqueline Tong	Daisy Peel	Upstairs, Downstairs	PBS
1978 (30th)
1978 (30th)	Nancy Marchand	Margaret Pynchon	Lou Grant	CBS
1978 (30th)	Meredith Baxter	Nancy Lawrence Maitland	Family	ABC
1978 (30th)	Tovah Feldshuh #	Helena Slomova	Holocaust	NBC
1978 (30th)	Linda Kelsey	Billie Newman	Lou Grant	CBS
1978 (30th)	Kristy McNichol	Letitia "Buddy" Lawrence	Family	ABC
Outstanding Supporting Actress in a Drama Series
1979 (31st)
1979 (31st)	Kristy McNichol	Letitia "Buddy" Lawrence	Family	ABC
1979 (31st)	Linda Kelsey	Billie Newman	Lou Grant	CBS
1979 (31st)	Nancy Marchand	Margaret Pynchon	Lou Grant	CBS

=== 1980s ===
Year	Actress	Role	Program	Network
1980 (32nd)
1980 (32nd)	Nancy Marchand	Margaret Pynchon	Lou Grant	CBS
1980 (32nd)	Nina Foch §	Mrs. Polk	Lou Grant	CBS
1980 (32nd)	Linda Kelsey	Billie Newman	Lou Grant	CBS
1980 (32nd)	Jessica Walter	Melanie McIntyre	Trapper John, M.D.	CBS
1981 (33rd)
1981 (33rd)	Nancy Marchand	Margaret Pynchon	Lou Grant	CBS
1981 (33rd)	Barbara Barrie	Evelyn Stroller	Breaking Away	ABC
1981 (33rd)	Barbara Bosson	Fay Furillo	Hill Street Blues	NBC
1981 (33rd)	Linda Kelsey	Billie Newman	Lou Grant	CBS
1981 (33rd)	Betty Thomas	Sgt. Lucille Bates	Hill Street Blues	NBC
1982 (34th)
1982 (34th)	Nancy Marchand	Margaret Pynchon	Lou Grant	CBS
1982 (34th)	Barbara Bosson	Fay Furillo	Hill Street Blues	NBC
1982 (34th)	Julie Harris	Lilimae Clements	Knots Landing	CBS
1982 (34th)	Linda Kelsey	Billie Newman	Lou Grant	CBS
1982 (34th)	Betty Thomas	Sgt. Lucille Bates	Hill Street Blues	NBC
1983 (35th)
1983 (35th)	Doris Roberts §	Cora	St. Elsewhere	NBC
1983 (35th)	Barbara Bosson	Fay Furillo	Hill Street Blues	NBC
1983 (35th)	Christina Pickles	Nurse Helen Rosenthal	St. Elsewhere	
1983 (35th)	Madge Sinclair	Nurse Ernestine Shoop	Trapper John, M.D.	CBS
1983 (35th)	Betty Thomas	Sgt. Lucille Bates	Hill Street Blues	NBC
1984 (36th)
1984 (36th)	Alfre Woodard §	Doris Robson	Hill Street Blues	NBC
1984 (36th)	Barbara Bosson	Fay Furillo	Hill Street Blues	NBC
1984 (36th)	Piper Laurie §	Fran Singleton	St. Elsewhere	NBC
1984 (36th)	Madge Sinclair	Nurse Ernestine Shoop	Trapper John, M.D.	CBS
1984 (36th)	Betty Thomas	Sgt. Lucille Bates	Hill Street Blues	NBC
1985 (37th)
1985 (37th)	Betty Thomas	Sgt. Lucille Bates	Hill Street Blues	NBC
1985 (37th)	Barbara Bosson	Fay Furillo	Hill Street Blues	NBC
1985 (37th)	Christina Pickles	Nurse Helen Rosenthal	St. Elsewhere	NBC
1985 (37th)	Doris Roberts	Mildred Krebs	Remington Steele	NBC
1985 (37th)	Madge Sinclair	Nurse Ernestine Shoop	Trapper John, M.D.	CBS
1986 (38th)
1986 (38th)	Bonnie Bartlett	Ellen Craig	St. Elsewhere	NBC
1986 (38th)	Allyce Beasley	Agnes DiPesto	Moonlighting	ABC
1986 (38th)	Christina Pickles	Nurse Helen Rosenthal	St. Elsewhere	NBC
1986 (38th)	Betty Thomas	Sgt. Lucille Bates	Hill Street Blues	NBC
1987 (39th)
1987 (39th)	Bonnie Bartlett	Ellen Craig	St. Elsewhere	NBC
1987 (39th)	Allyce Beasley	Agnes DiPesto	Moonlighting	ABC
1987 (39th)	Christina Pickles	Nurse Helen Rosenthal	St. Elsewhere	NBC
1987 (39th)	Susan Ruttan	Roxanne Melman	L.A. Law	NBC
1987 (39th)	Betty Thomas	Sgt. Lucille Bates	Hill Street Blues	NBC
1988 (40th)
1988 (40th)	Patricia Wettig	Nancy Krieger Weston	Thirtysomething	ABC
1988 (40th)	Bonnie Bartlett	Ellen Craig	St. Elsewhere	NBC
1988 (40th)	Polly Draper	Ellyn Warren	Thirtysomething	ABC
1988 (40th)	Christina Pickles	Nurse Helen Rosenthal	St. Elsewhere	NBC
1988 (40th)	Susan Ruttan	Roxanne Melman	L.A. Law	NBC
1989 (41st)
1989 (41st)	Melanie Mayron	Melissa Steadman	Thirtysomething	ABC
1989 (41st)	Michele Greene	Abby Perkins	L.A. Law	NBC
1989 (41st)	Lois Nettleton	Joanne St. John	In the Heat of the Night	NBC
1989 (41st)	Amanda Plummer	Alice Hackett	L.A. Law	NBC
1989 (41st)	Susan Ruttan	Roxanne Melman	L.A. Law	NBC

=== 1990s ===
Year	Actress	Role	Program	Network
1990 (42nd)
1990 (42nd)	Marg Helgenberger	Karen "K. C." Koloski	China Beach	ABC
1990 (42nd)	Sherilyn Fenn	Audrey Horne	Twin Peaks	ABC
1990 (42nd)	Melanie Mayron	Melissa Steadman	Thirtysomething	ABC
1990 (42nd)	Diana Muldaur	Rosalind Shays	L.A. Law	NBC
1990 (42nd)	Susan Ruttan	Roxanne Melman	L.A. Law	NBC
1991 (43rd)
1991 (43rd)	Madge Sinclair	Empress Josephine	Gabriel's Fire	ABC
1991 (43rd)	Marg Helgenberger	Karen "K. C." Koloski	China Beach	ABC
1991 (43rd)	Piper Laurie	Catherine Martell	Twin Peaks	ABC
1991 (43rd)	Melanie Mayron	Melissa Steadman	Thirtysomething	ABC
1991 (43rd)	Diana Muldaur	Rosalind Shays	L.A. Law	NBC
1992 (44th)
1992 (44th)	Valerie Mahaffey §	Eve	Northern Exposure	CBS
1992 (44th)	Mary Alice	Marguerite Peck	I'll Fly Away	NBC
1992 (44th)	Barbara Barrie §	Mrs. Bream	Law & Order	NBC
1992 (44th)	Conchata Ferrell	Susan Bloom	L.A. Law	NBC
1992 (44th)	Cynthia Geary	Shelly Tambo	Northern Exposure	CBS
1992 (44th)	Marg Helgenberger	Karen "K. C." Koloski	China Beach	ABC
1992 (44th)	Kay Lenz	Maggie Zombro	Reasonable Doubts	NBC
1993 (45th)
1993 (45th)	Mary Alice	Marguerite Peck	I'll Fly Away	NBC
1993 (45th)	Cynthia Geary	Shelly Tambo	Northern Exposure	CBS
1993 (45th)	Kay Lenz	Maggie Zombro	Reasonable Doubts	NBC
1993 (45th)	Kellie Martin	Rebecca Thatcher	Life Goes On	ABC
1993 (45th)	Peg Phillips	Ruth-Anne Miller	Northern Exposure	CBS
1994 (46th)
1994 (46th)	Leigh Taylor-Young	Rachel Harris	Picket Fences	CBS
1994 (46th)	Amy Brenneman	Janice Licalsi	NYPD Blue	ABC
1994 (46th)	Jill Eikenberry	Ann Kelsey	L.A. Law	NBC
1994 (46th)	Sharon Lawrence	Sylvia Costas	NYPD Blue	ABC
1994 (46th)	Gail O'Grady	Donna Abandando	NYPD Blue	ABC
1995 (47th)
1995 (47th)	Julianna Margulies	Carol Hathaway	ER	NBC
1995 (47th)	Barbara Babcock	Dorothy Jennings	Dr. Quinn, Medicine Woman	CBS
1995 (47th)	Tyne Daly	Alice Henderson	Christy	CBS
1995 (47th)	Sharon Lawrence	Sylvia Costas	NYPD Blue	ABC
1995 (47th)	Gail O'Grady	Donna Abandando	NYPD Blue	ABC
1996 (48th)
1996 (48th)	Tyne Daly	Alice Henderson	Christy	CBS
1996 (48th)	Barbara Bosson	Miriam Grasso	Murder One	ABC
1996 (48th)	Sharon Lawrence	Sylvia Costas	NYPD Blue	ABC
1996 (48th)	Julianna Margulies	Carol Hathaway	ER	NBC
1996 (48th)	Gail O'Grady	Donna Abandando	NYPD Blue	ABC
1997 (49th)
1997 (49th)	Kim Delaney	Diane Russell	NYPD Blue	ABC
1997 (49th)	Laura Innes	Kerry Weaver	ER	NBC
1997 (49th)	CCH Pounder	Angela Hicks	ER	NBC
1997 (49th)	Della Reese	Tess	Touched by an Angel	CBS
1997 (49th)	Gloria Reuben	Jeanie Boulet	ER	NBC
1998 (50th)
1998 (50th)	Camryn Manheim	Ellenor Frutt	The Practice	ABC
1998 (50th)	Kim Delaney	Diane Russell	NYPD Blue	ABC
1998 (50th)	Laura Innes	Kerry Weaver	ER	NBC
1998 (50th)	Della Reese	Tess	Touched by an Angel	CBS
1998 (50th)	Gloria Reuben	Jeanie Boulet	ER	NBC
1999 (51st)
1999 (51st)	Holland Taylor	Roberta Kittleson	The Practice	ABC
1999 (51st)	Lara Flynn Boyle	Helen Gamble	The Practice	ABC
1999 (51st)	Kim Delaney	Diane Russell	NYPD Blue	ABC
1999 (51st)	Camryn Manheim	Ellenor Frutt	The Practice	ABC
1999 (51st)	Nancy Marchand	Livia Soprano	The Sopranos	HBO

=== 2000s ===
Year	Actress	Role	Program	Episode Submissions	Network
2000 (52nd)
2000 (52nd)	Allison Janney	C. J. Cregg	The West Wing	"Celestial Navigation" + "Lies, Damn Lies, and Statistics"	NBC
2000 (52nd)	Stockard Channing	Abbey Bartlet	The West Wing	"The State Dinner" + "He Shall, from Time to Time..."	NBC
2000 (52nd)	Tyne Daly	Maxine Gray	Judging Amy	"Shaken, Not Stirred" + "Gray vs. Gray"	CBS
2000 (52nd)	Nancy Marchand	Livia Soprano	The Sopranos	"Do Not Resuscitate" + "Funhouse"	HBO
2000 (52nd)	Holland Taylor	Roberta Kittleson	The Practice	"Legacy" + "Oz"	ABC
2001 (53rd)
2001 (53rd)	Allison Janney	C. J. Cregg	The West Wing	"In the Shadow of Two Gunmen" (Part 2) + "Galileo"	NBC
2001 (53rd)	Stockard Channing	Abbey Bartlet	The West Wing	"Bartlet's Third State of the Union" + "The War at Home"	NBC
2001 (53rd)	Maura Tierney	Abby Lockhart	ER	"Fear of Commitment" + "Where the Heart Is"	NBC
2001 (53rd)	Tyne Daly	Maxine Gray	Judging Amy	"Unnecessary Roughness" + "Water World"	CBS
2001 (53rd)	Aida Turturro	Janice Soprano	The Sopranos	"Proshai, Livushka" + "Employee of the Month"	HBO
2002 (54th)
2002 (54th)	Stockard Channing	Abbey Bartlet	The West Wing	"Dead Irish Writers" + "Gone Quiet"	NBC
2002 (54th)	Janel Moloney	Donna Moss	The West Wing	"On the Day Before" + "War Crimes"	NBC
2002 (54th)	Mary-Louise Parker	Amy Gardner	The West Wing	"The Women of Qumar" + "H. Con-172"	NBC
2002 (54th)	Lauren Ambrose	Claire Fisher	Six Feet Under	"The Trip" + "The Plan"	HBO
2002 (54th)	Tyne Daly	Maxine Gray	Judging Amy	"Come Back Soon"	CBS
2003 (55th)
2003 (55th)	Tyne Daly	Maxine Gray	Judging Amy	"Maxine, Interrupted" + "Requiem"	CBS
2003 (55th)	Lauren Ambrose	Claire Fisher	Six Feet Under	"Nobody Sleeps" + "Twilight"	HBO
2003 (55th)	Rachel Griffiths	Brenda Chenowith	Six Feet Under	"Timing & Space" + "The Opening"	HBO
2003 (55th)	Stockard Channing	Abbey Bartlet	The West Wing	"Privateers" + "Twenty Five"	NBC
2003 (55th)	Lena Olin	Irina Derevko	Alias	"Passage (Part 2)" + "A Dark Turn"	ABC
2004 (56th)
2004 (56th)	Drea de Matteo	Adriana La Cerva	The Sopranos	"Irregular Around the Margins" + "Long Term Parking"	HBO
2004 (56th)	Stockard Channing	Abbey Bartlet	The West Wing	"7A WF 83429" + "No Exit"	NBC
2004 (56th)	Janel Moloney	Donna Moss	The West Wing	"No Exit" + "Gaza"	NBC
2004 (56th)	Tyne Daly	Maxine Gray	Judging Amy	"Ex Parte of Five" + "Roadhouse Blues"	CBS
2004 (56th)	Robin Weigert	Calamity Jane	Deadwood	"Deep Water" + "No Other Sons or Daughters"	HBO
2005 (57th)
2005 (57th)	Blythe Danner	Isabelle "Izzy" Huffstodt	Huff	"Is She Dead?" + "Christmas Is Ruined"	Showtime
2005 (57th)	Stockard Channing	Abbey Bartlet	The West Wing	"Third-Day Story" + "The Wake Up Call"	NBC
2005 (57th)	Tyne Daly	Maxine Gray	Judging Amy	"Early Winter" + "Too Little, Too Late"	CBS
2005 (57th)	Sandra Oh	Cristina Yang	Grey's Anatomy	"No Man's Land" + "Save Me"	ABC
2005 (57th)	CCH Pounder	Claudette Wyms	The Shield	"Doghouse" + "Tar Baby"	FX
2006 (58th)
2006 (58th)	Blythe Danner	Isabelle "Izzy" Huffstodt	Huff	"Maps Don't Talk (Part 2)" + "So... What Brings You to Armageddon?"	Showtime
2006 (58th)	Sandra Oh	Cristina Yang	Grey's Anatomy	"Deny, Deny, Deny" + "Grandma Got Run Over by a Reindeer"	ABC
2006 (58th)	Chandra Wilson	Miranda Bailey	Grey's Anatomy	"Deny, Deny, Deny" + "As We Know It"	ABC
2006 (58th)	Candice Bergen	Shirley Schmidt	Boston Legal	"The Ass Fat Jungle" + "Live Big"	ABC
2006 (58th)	Jean Smart	Martha Logan	24	"Day 5: 5:00 a.m. – 6:00 a.m." + "Day 5: 6:00 a.m. – 7:00 a.m."	Fox
2007 (59th)
2007 (59th)	Katherine Heigl	Izzie Stevens	Grey's Anatomy	"Time After Time"	ABC
2007 (59th)	Sandra Oh	Cristina Yang	Grey's Anatomy	"From a Whisper to a Scream"	ABC
2007 (59th)	Chandra Wilson	Miranda Bailey	Grey's Anatomy	"Oh, the Guilt"	ABC
2007 (59th)	Lorraine Bracco	Jennifer Melfi	The Sopranos	"The Blue Comet"	HBO
2007 (59th)	Aida Turturro	Janice Soprano	The Sopranos	"Soprano Home Movies"	HBO
2007 (59th)	Rachel Griffiths	Sarah Walker	Brothers & Sisters	"Bad News"	ABC
2008 (60th)
2008 (60th)	Dianne Wiest	Dr. Gina Toll	In Treatment	"Week 6: Paul and Gina"	HBO
2008 (60th)	Candice Bergen	Shirley Schmidt	Boston Legal	"The Mighty Rogues"	ABC
2008 (60th)	Rachel Griffiths	Sarah Walker	Brothers & Sisters	"Domestic Issues"	ABC
2008 (60th)	Sandra Oh	Cristina Yang	Grey's Anatomy	"The Becoming"	ABC
2008 (60th)	Chandra Wilson	Miranda Bailey	Grey's Anatomy	"Lay Your Hands on Me"	ABC
2009 (61st)
2009 (61st)	Cherry Jones	Allison Taylor	24	"Day 7: 7:00 a.m. – 8:00 a.m."	Fox
2009 (61st)	Rose Byrne	Ellen Parsons	Damages	"Trust Me"	FX
2009 (61st)	Hope Davis	Mia Nesky	In Treatment	"Week 6: Mia"	HBO
2009 (61st)	Sandra Oh	Cristina Yang	Grey's Anatomy	"Elevator Love Letter"	ABC
2009 (61st)	Chandra Wilson	Miranda Bailey	Grey's Anatomy	"Stairway to Heaven"	ABC
2009 (61st)	Dianne Wiest	Dr. Gina Toll	In Treatment	"Week 6: Gina"	HBO

=== 2010s ===
Year	Actress	Role	Program	Episode Submissions	Network
2010 (62nd)
2010 (62nd)	Archie Panjabi	Kalinda Sharma	The Good Wife	"Hi"	CBS
2010 (62nd)	Christine Baranski	Diane Lockhart	The Good Wife	"Bang"	CBS
2010 (62nd)	Rose Byrne	Ellen Parsons	Damages	"Your Secrets Are Safe"	FX
2010 (62nd)	Sharon Gless	Madeline Westen	Burn Notice	"Devil You Know"	USA
2010 (62nd)	Christina Hendricks	Joan Harris	Mad Men	"Guy Walks Into an Advertising Agency"	AMC
2010 (62nd)	Elisabeth Moss	Peggy Olson	Mad Men	"Love Among the Ruins"	AMC
2011 (63rd)
2011 (63rd)	Margo Martindale	Mags Bennett	Justified	"Brother's Keeper"	FX
2011 (63rd)	Christine Baranski	Diane Lockhart	The Good Wife	"Silver Bullet"	CBS
2011 (63rd)	Michelle Forbes	Mitch Larsen	The Killing	"Pilot"	AMC
2011 (63rd)	Christina Hendricks	Joan Harris	Mad Men	"The Summer Man"	AMC
2011 (63rd)	Kelly Macdonald	Margaret Thompson	Boardwalk Empire	"Family Limitation"	HBO
2011 (63rd)	Archie Panjabi	Kalinda Sharma	The Good Wife	"Getting Off"	CBS
2012 (64th)
2012 (64th)	Maggie Smith	Violet Crawley	Downton Abbey	"Episode 201"	PBS
2012 (64th)	Christine Baranski	Diane Lockhart	The Good Wife	"Alienation of Affection"	CBS
2012 (64th)	Joanne Froggatt	Anna Bates	Downton Abbey	"Episode 207"	PBS
2012 (64th)	Anna Gunn	Skyler White	Breaking Bad	"Cornered"	AMC
2012 (64th)	Christina Hendricks	Joan Harris	Mad Men	"The Other Woman"	AMC
2012 (64th)	Archie Panjabi	Kalinda Sharma	The Good Wife	"The Dream Team"	CBS
2013 (65th)
2013 (65th)	Anna Gunn	Skyler White	Breaking Bad	"Fifty-One"	AMC
2013 (65th)	Morena Baccarin	Jessica Brody	Homeland	"State of Independence"	Showtime
2013 (65th)	Christine Baranski	Diane Lockhart	The Good Wife	"The Seven Day Rule"	CBS
2013 (65th)	Emilia Clarke	Daenerys Targaryen	Game of Thrones	"And Now His Watch Is Ended"	HBO
2013 (65th)	Christina Hendricks	Joan Harris	Mad Men	"A Tale of Two Cities"	AMC
2013 (65th)	Maggie Smith	Violet Crawley	Downton Abbey	"Episode 301"	PBS
2014 (66th)
2014 (66th)	Anna Gunn	Skyler White	Breaking Bad	"Ozymandias"	AMC
2014 (66th)	Christine Baranski	Diane Lockhart	The Good Wife	"The Last Call"	CBS
2014 (66th)	Joanne Froggatt	Anna Bates	Downton Abbey	"Episode 404"	PBS
2014 (66th)	Lena Headey	Cersei Lannister	Game of Thrones	"The Lion and the Rose"	HBO
2014 (66th)	Christina Hendricks	Joan Harris	Mad Men	"The Strategy"	AMC
2014 (66th)	Maggie Smith	Violet Crawley	Downton Abbey	"Episode 408"	PBS
2015 (67th)
2015 (67th)	Uzo Aduba	Suzanne "Crazy Eyes" Warren	Orange Is the New Black	"Hugs Can Be Deceiving"	Netflix
2015 (67th)	Christine Baranski	Diane Lockhart	The Good Wife	"Loser Edit"	CBS
2015 (67th)	Emilia Clarke	Daenerys Targaryen	Game of Thrones	"The Dance of Dragons"	HBO
2015 (67th)	Joanne Froggatt	Anna Bates	Downton Abbey	"Episode 508"	PBS
2015 (67th)	Lena Headey	Cersei Lannister	Game of Thrones	"Mother's Mercy"	HBO
2015 (67th)	Christina Hendricks	Joan Harris	Mad Men	"Lost Horizon"	AMC
2016 (68th)
2016 (68th)	Maggie Smith	Violet Crawley	Downton Abbey	"Episode 606"	PBS
2016 (68th)	Emilia Clarke	Daenerys Targaryen	Game of Thrones	"Book of the Stranger"	HBO
2016 (68th)	Lena Headey	Cersei Lannister	Game of Thrones	"The Winds of Winter"	HBO
2016 (68th)	Maura Tierney	Helen Solloway	The Affair	"204"	Showtime
2016 (68th)	Maisie Williams	Arya Stark	Game of Thrones	"No One"	HBO
2016 (68th)	Constance Zimmer	Quinn King	UnREAL	"Mother"	Lifetime
2017 (69th)
2017 (69th)	Ann Dowd	Aunt Lydia	The Handmaid's Tale	"Offred"	Hulu
2017 (69th)	Uzo Aduba	Suzanne "Crazy Eyes" Warren	Orange Is the New Black	"People Persons"	Netflix
2017 (69th)	Millie Bobby Brown	Eleven	Stranger Things	"Chapter Seven: The Bathtub"	Netflix
2017 (69th)	Chrissy Metz	Kate Pearson	This Is Us	"Pilot"	NBC
2017 (69th)	Thandiwe Newton	Maeve Millay	Westworld	"Trace Decay"	HBO
2017 (69th)	Samira Wiley	Moira	The Handmaid's Tale	"Night"	Hulu
2018 (70th)
2018 (70th)	Thandiwe Newton	Maeve Millay	Westworld	"Akane no Mai"	HBO
2018 (70th)	Millie Bobby Brown	Eleven	Stranger Things	"Chapter Three: The Pollywog"	Netflix
2018 (70th)	Alexis Bledel	Emily / Ofsteven	The Handmaid's Tale	"Unwomen"	Hulu
2018 (70th)	Ann Dowd	Aunt Lydia	The Handmaid's Tale	"June"	Hulu
2018 (70th)	Lena Headey	Cersei Lannister	Game of Thrones	"The Dragon and the Wolf"	HBO
2018 (70th)	Vanessa Kirby	Princess Margaret	The Crown	"Beryl"	Netflix
2018 (70th)	Yvonne Strahovski	Serena Joy Waterford	The Handmaid's Tale	"Women's Work"	Hulu
2019 (71st)
2019 (71st)	Julia Garner	Ruth Langmore	Ozark	"The Gold Coast"	Netflix
2019 (71st)	Gwendoline Christie	Brienne of Tarth	Game of Thrones	"A Knight of the Seven Kingdoms"	HBO
2019 (71st)	Lena Headey	Cersei Lannister	Game of Thrones	"The Bells"	HBO
2019 (71st)	Fiona Shaw	Carolyn Martens	Killing Eve	"Nice and Neat"	BBC America
2019 (71st)	Sophie Turner	Sansa Stark	Game of Thrones	"Winterfell"	HBO
2019 (71st)	Maisie Williams	Arya Stark	Game of Thrones	"The Long Night"	HBO

=== 2020s ===
Year	Actress	Role	Program	Episode Submissions	Network
2020 (72nd)
2020 (72nd)	Julia Garner	Ruth Langmore	Ozark	"In Case of Emergency"	Netflix
2020 (72nd)	Helena Bonham Carter	Princess Margaret	The Crown	"Cri de Coeur"	Netflix
2020 (72nd)	Laura Dern	Renata Klein	Big Little Lies	"Tell-Tale Hearts"	HBO
2020 (72nd)	Thandiwe Newton	Maeve Millay	Westworld	"The Winter Line"	HBO
2020 (72nd)	Fiona Shaw	Carolyn Martens	Killing Eve	"Management Sucks"	BBC America
2020 (72nd)	Sarah Snook	Siobhan "Shiv" Roy	Succession	"The Summer Palace"	HBO
2020 (72nd)	Meryl Streep	Mary Louise Wright	Big Little Lies	"I Want to Know"	HBO
2020 (72nd)	Samira Wiley	Moira Strand	The Handmaid's Tale	"Sacrifice"	Hulu
2021 (73rd)
2021 (73rd)	Gillian Anderson	Margaret Thatcher	The Crown	"Favourites"	Netflix
2021 (73rd)	Helena Bonham Carter	Princess Margaret	The Crown	"The Hereditary Principle"	Netflix
2021 (73rd)	Madeline Brewer	Janine Lindo	The Handmaid's Tale	"Testimony"	Hulu
2021 (73rd)	Ann Dowd	Aunt Lydia	The Handmaid's Tale	"Progress"	Hulu
2021 (73rd)	Aunjanue Ellis-Taylor	Hippolyta Freeman	Lovecraft Country	"I Am."	HBO
2021 (73rd)	Emerald Fennell	Camilla Parker Bowles	The Crown	"Fairytale"	Netflix
2021 (73rd)	Yvonne Strahovski	Serena Joy Waterford	The Handmaid's Tale	"Home"	Hulu
2021 (73rd)	Samira Wiley	Moira Strand	The Handmaid's Tale	"Vows"	Hulu
2022 (74th)
2022 (74th)	Julia Garner	Ruth Langmore	Ozark	"Sanctified"	Netflix
2022 (74th)	Patricia Arquette	Harmony Cobel	Severance	"What's for Dinner?"	Apple TV+
2022 (74th)	Jung Ho-yeon	Kang Sae-byeok	Squid Game	"Gganbu"	Netflix
2022 (74th)	Christina Ricci	Misty Quigley	Yellowjackets	"Sic Transit Gloria Mundi"	Showtime
2022 (74th)	Rhea Seehorn	Kim Wexler	Better Call Saul	"Hit and Run"	AMC
2022 (74th)	J. Smith-Cameron	Gerri Kellman	Succession	"The Disruption"	HBO
2022 (74th)	Sarah Snook	Siobhan "Shiv" Roy	Succession	"Chiantishire"	HBO
2022 (74th)	Sydney Sweeney	Cassie Howard	Euphoria	"Ruminations: Big and Little Bullys"	HBO
2023 (75th)
2023 (75th)	Jennifer Coolidge	Tanya McQuoid-Hunt	The White Lotus	"Arrivederci"	HBO
2023 (75th)	Elizabeth Debicki	Princess Diana	The Crown	"Couple 31"	Netflix
2023 (75th)	Meghann Fahy	Daphne Sullivan	The White Lotus	"Arrivederci"	HBO
2023 (75th)	Sabrina Impacciatore	Valentina	The White Lotus	"Abductions"	HBO
2023 (75th)	Aubrey Plaza	Harper Spiller	The White Lotus	"That's Amore"	HBO
2023 (75th)	Rhea Seehorn	Kim Wexler	Better Call Saul	"Waterworks"	AMC
2023 (75th)	J. Smith-Cameron	Gerri Kellman	Succession	"Living+"	HBO
2023 (75th)	Simona Tabasco	Lucia Greco	The White Lotus	"That's Amore"	HBO
2024 (76th)
2024 (76th)	Elizabeth Debicki	Princess Diana	The Crown	"Dis-Moi Oui"	Netflix
2024 (76th)	Christine Baranski	Agnes van Rhijn	The Gilded Age	"In Terms of Winning and Losing"	HBO
2024 (76th)	Nicole Beharie	Christine Hunter	The Morning Show	"White Noise"	Apple TV+
2024 (76th)	Greta Lee	Stella Bak	The Morning Show	"The Green Light"	Apple TV+
2024 (76th)	Lesley Manville	Princess Margaret	The Crown	"Ritz"	Netflix
2024 (76th)	Karen Pittman	Mia Jordan	The Morning Show	"Love Island"	Apple TV+
2024 (76th)	Holland Taylor	Cybil Reynolds	The Morning Show	"White Noise"	Apple TV+
2025 (77th)
2025 (77th)	Katherine LaNasa	Dana Evans	The Pitt	"9:00 P.M."	HBO Max
2025 (77th)	Patricia Arquette	Harmony Cobel	Severance	"Sweet Vitirol"	Apple TV+
2025 (77th)	Julianne Nicholson	Samantha "Sinatra" Redmond	Paradise	"Sinatra"	Hulu
2025 (77th)	Parker Posey	Victoria Ratliff	The White Lotus	"Full-Moon Party"	HBO
2025 (77th)	Carrie Coon	Laurie Duffy	The White Lotus	"Amor Fati"	HBO
2025 (77th)	Natasha Rothwell	Belinda Lindsey	The White Lotus	"Amor Fati"	HBO
2025 (77th)	Aimee Lou Wood	Chelsea	The White Lotus	"Amor Fati"	HBO
2026 (78th)
2026 (78th)	Allison Janney	President Grace Penn	The Diplomat	"Amagansett"	Netflix
2026 (78th)	Taylor Dearden	Dr. Melissa "Mel" King	The Pitt	"5:00 P.M."	HBO Max
2026 (78th)	Fiona Dourif	Dr. Cassie McKay	The Pitt	"5:00 P.M."	HBO Max
2026 (78th)	Katherine LaNasa	Dana Evans	The Pitt	"1:00 P.M."	HBO Max
2026 (78th)	Sepideh Moafi	Dr. Baran Al-Hashimi	The Pitt	"9:00 P.M."	HBO Max
2026 (78th)	Julianne Nicholson	Samantha "Sinatra" Redmond	Paradise	"Exodus"	Hulu
2026 (78th)	Karolina Wydra	Zosia	Pluribus	"Charm Offensive"	Apple TV

== Programs with multiple wins ==
4 wins

- Lou Grant (3 consecutive)

3 wins

- Ozark (2 consecutive)
- St. Elsewhere (2 consecutive)
- The Waltons (2 consecutive)
- The West Wing (consecutive)

2 wins

- Breaking Bad (consecutive)
- Caesar's Hour
- The Crown
- Downton Abbey
- Family
- Hill Street Blues (consecutive)
- Huff (consecutive)
- The Practice (consecutive)
- thirtysomething (consecutive)

== Programs with multiple nominations ==
13 nominations

- Hill Street Blues

12 nominations

- Game of Thrones

11 nominations

- Lou Grant
- The West Wing

10 nominations

- Grey's Anatomy
- The Handmaid's Tale
- L.A. Law
- NYPD Blue
- St. Elsewhere

9 nominations

- The Good Wife
- The White Lotus

8 nominations

- The Crown
- ER

7 nominations

- Downton Abbey
- Mad Men

6 nominations

- Judging Amy
- The Sopranos

5 nominations

- Family
- The Pitt
- The Practice
- thirtysomething
- The Waltons

4 nominations

- I Love Lucy
- Mannix
- The Morning Show
- Northern Exposure
- Succession
- Trapper John, M.D.

3 nominations

- Ben Casey
- The Bob Cummings Show
- Breaking Bad
- Caesar's Hour
- China Beach
- In Treatment
- Ironside
- The Jackie Gleason Show
- McMillan & Wife
- The Name of the Game
- Ozark
- Six Feet Under
- Upstairs, Downstairs
- Westworld

2 nominations

- 24
- Arrest and Trial
- Better Call Saul
- Big Little Lies
- Boston Legal
- Brothers & Sisters
- Christy
- Damages
- The Dick Van Dyke Show
- The George Burns and Gracie Allen Show
- Huff
- I'll Fly Away
- Killing Eve
- Make Room for Daddy
- Marcus Welby, M.D.
- Mister Peepers
- Moonlighting
- Orange Is the New Black
- Paradise
- Perry Mason
- Peter Gunn
- Peyton Place
- Reasonable Doubts
- Severance
- Stranger Things
- Touched by an Angel
- Twin Peaks

== Performers with multiple wins ==
4 wins

- Nancy Marchand (3 consecutive)

3 wins

- Ellen Corby (2 consecutive)
- Julia Garner (2 consecutive)
- Allison Janney (2 consecutive)

2 wins

- Bonnie Bartlett (consecutive)
- Tyne Daly
- Blythe Danner (consecutive)
- Anna Gunn (consecutive)
- Kristy McNichol
- Maggie Smith

== Performers with multiple nominations ==
8 nominations

- Tyne Daly

7 nominations

- Christine Baranski
- Nancy Marchand
- Betty Thomas

6 nominations

- Barbara Bosson
- Stockard Channing
- Christina Hendricks

5 nominations

- Ellen Corby
- Lena Headey
- Linda Kelsey
- Sandra Oh
- Christina Pickles

4 nominations

- Gail Fisher
- Susan Ruttan
- Madge Sinclair
- Maggie Smith
- Chandra Wilson

3 nominations

- Barbara Anderson
- Bonnie Bartlett
- Emilia Clarke
- Kim Delaney
- Ann Dowd
- Joanne Froggatt
- Julia Garner
- Rachel Griffiths
- Anna Gunn
- Marg Helgenberger
- Allison Janney
- Sharon Lawrence
- Melanie Mayron
- Kristy McNichol
- Thandiwe Newton
- Gail O'Grady
- Archie Panjabi
- Susan Saint James
- Holland Taylor
- Nancy Walker
- Samira Wiley

2 nominations

- Uzo Aduba
- Mary Alice
- Lauren Ambrose
- Patricia Arquette
- Angela Baddeley
- Barbara Barrie
- Meredith Baxter
- Allyce Beasley
- Candice Bergen
- Helena Bonham Carter
- Millie Bobby Brown
- Rose Byrne
- Blythe Danner
- Elizabeth Debicki
- Cynthia Geary
- Barbara Hale
- Laura Innes
- Katherine LaNasa
- Piper Laurie
- Kay Lenz
- Camryn Manheim
- Julianna Margulies
- Janel Moloney
- Diana Muldaur
- Julianne Nicholson
- CCH Pounder
- Della Reese
- Gloria Reuben
- Doris Roberts
- Rhea Seehorn
- Fiona Shaw
- J. Smith-Cameron
- Sarah Snook
- Yvonne Strahovski
- Maura Tierney
- Aida Turturro
- Elena Verdugo
- Dianne Wiest
- Maisie Williams

== See also ==
- Primetime Emmy Award for Outstanding Lead Actor in a Comedy Series
- Primetime Emmy Award for Outstanding Lead Actress in a Comedy Series
- Primetime Emmy Award for Outstanding Supporting Actor in a Comedy Series
- Primetime Emmy Award for Outstanding Supporting Actress in a Comedy Series
- Primetime Emmy Award for Outstanding Lead Actor in a Drama Series
- Primetime Emmy Award for Outstanding Lead Actress in a Drama Series
- Primetime Emmy Award for Outstanding Supporting Actor in a Drama Series
- Primetime Emmy Award for Outstanding Lead Actor in a Limited or Anthology Series or Movie
- Primetime Emmy Award for Outstanding Lead Actress in a Limited or Anthology Series or Movie
- Primetime Emmy Award for Outstanding Supporting Actor in a Limited or Anthology Series or Movie
- Primetime Emmy Award for Outstanding Supporting Actress in a Limited or Anthology Series or Movie
- Golden Globe Award for Best Supporting Actress – Series, Miniseries, or Television Film
