= Olga Masters =

Australian author

- Born: Olga Lawler; 28 May 1919; Pambula, New South Wales, Australia
- Died: 27 September 1986 (aged 67); Wollongong, New South Wales, Australia
- Occupations: Novelist; short story writer; journalist
- Spouse: Charles Masters
- Children: 7, including Roy Masters, Ian Masters, Chris Masters, Sue Masters

Olga Masters née Lawler (28 May 1919 – 27 September 1986) was an Australian writer, journalist, novelist and short story writer. Masters' children went on to be notable figures in journalism, media and film making.

== Early life ==
Olga Masters was born in Pambula, New South Wales, the second of eight children. Her early life was characterised by the poverty of the depression era, her family moving around the South Coast region in search of work. Masters herself began working as a journalist at the age of 15 on the Cobargo Chronicle, a weekly newspaper serving the south coastal area between Bega and Moruya.

In 1937, at the age of 18 she moved to Sydney, where she worked in office jobs and met Charles Masters, a teacher, whom she married in 1940. With him, she again travelled around country towns, including Grafton, Lismore and Urbenville, before returning to Sydney.

== Career ==
Masters wrote as a journalist for most of her life, and supplemented the family income by writing for local newspapers in the towns she lived in with her husband. On their return to Sydney, she wrote for papers such as The Manly Daily and The Sydney Morning Herald.

While she wanted to write fiction from an early age, she was not published as a writer of fiction until the late 1970s. During this decade she wrote several radio plays, receiving many rejections, but on 29 April 1977, her radio play The Penny Ha-penny Stamp was broadcast. However, with the publication of her short story, Call me Pinkie, in The Sydney Morning Herald in 1978, she moved from writing drama to prose fiction. Between 1979 and 1980, she won nine awards for her short stories. She wrote fiction full-time from 1982, after the publication of The Home Girls.

Due to her late start from age 58 and her relatively early death 11 years later, Masters' published output is small but her impact was disproportionate in that her style and writings about writing inspired many others to take up the craft.

In an interview, Masters described her fiction: "All my writing is about human behaviour. There's not much drama, no great happenings in it. No violence. It's about the violence that's inside the human heart, I think, more than anything else." In the same interview she also credits her journalistic career for helping her creative writing: "You would sometimes take quite an ordinary and humble person and write a story about them, and you'd be surprised at the quality that there was in the ordinary human being ... I learned a lot about human nature, and human behaviour, as a journalist ... there is more in life, more in situations, than meets the eye."

Webby, in discussing The Home Girls, states that her writing is not experimental, that its "virtues are the classic ones of tight dramatic structure, strong characterisation and believable dialogue". In listing her books for adults and senior students to read, Shapiro wrote that Masters "has been called one of the best writers of fiction in Australia. Comedies of manners written with sensitivity, wit, and exuberance. Novels about mothers and daughters, fathers and sons. A very special novelist who only began writing novels and short stories in her fifties after raising a large family."

== Awards ==
- 1977: Tasmanian Literary Awards for The Creek Way
- 1978: Grenfell Henry Lawson Awards, 2nd prize for A Dog that Squeaked
- 1979: Fellowship of Australian Writers, Qld (FAWQ), R. Carson Gold Award for The Snake and Bad Tom
- 1980: The South Pacific Association for Commonwealth Language and Literature Studies Award for The Rages of Mrs Torrens (jointly with Elizabeth Jolley)
- 1983: National Book Council Award for The Home Girls

== Bibliography ==
=== Short stories ===
- The Home Girls (1982) Review
- The Rose Fancier (1988)
- Reporting Home (1990) [Journalism]
- Collected Stories of Olga Masters (1996)
- "The Snake and bad Tom"

=== Novels ===
- Loving Daughters (1984)
- A Long Time Dying (1985) Published as a novel, it can also be described as connected short stories.
- Amy's Children (1987)

=== Drama ===
- The Working Man's Castle (1988)

== Family ==
Olga and Charles had seven children:

- Roy Masters, rugby league coach and journalist
- Ian Masters, radio broadcaster
- Quentin Masters, (1946 – ) film maker
- Chris Masters, (1948 – ) journalist
- Sue Masters media producer
- Deb Masters, media producer
- Michael Masters, ( – 1989)

== Death ==
Olga Masters died of a brain tumour in Wollongong Hospital in 1986.
