= Roy Masters (rugby league) =

Australian RL coach and former rugby league footballer

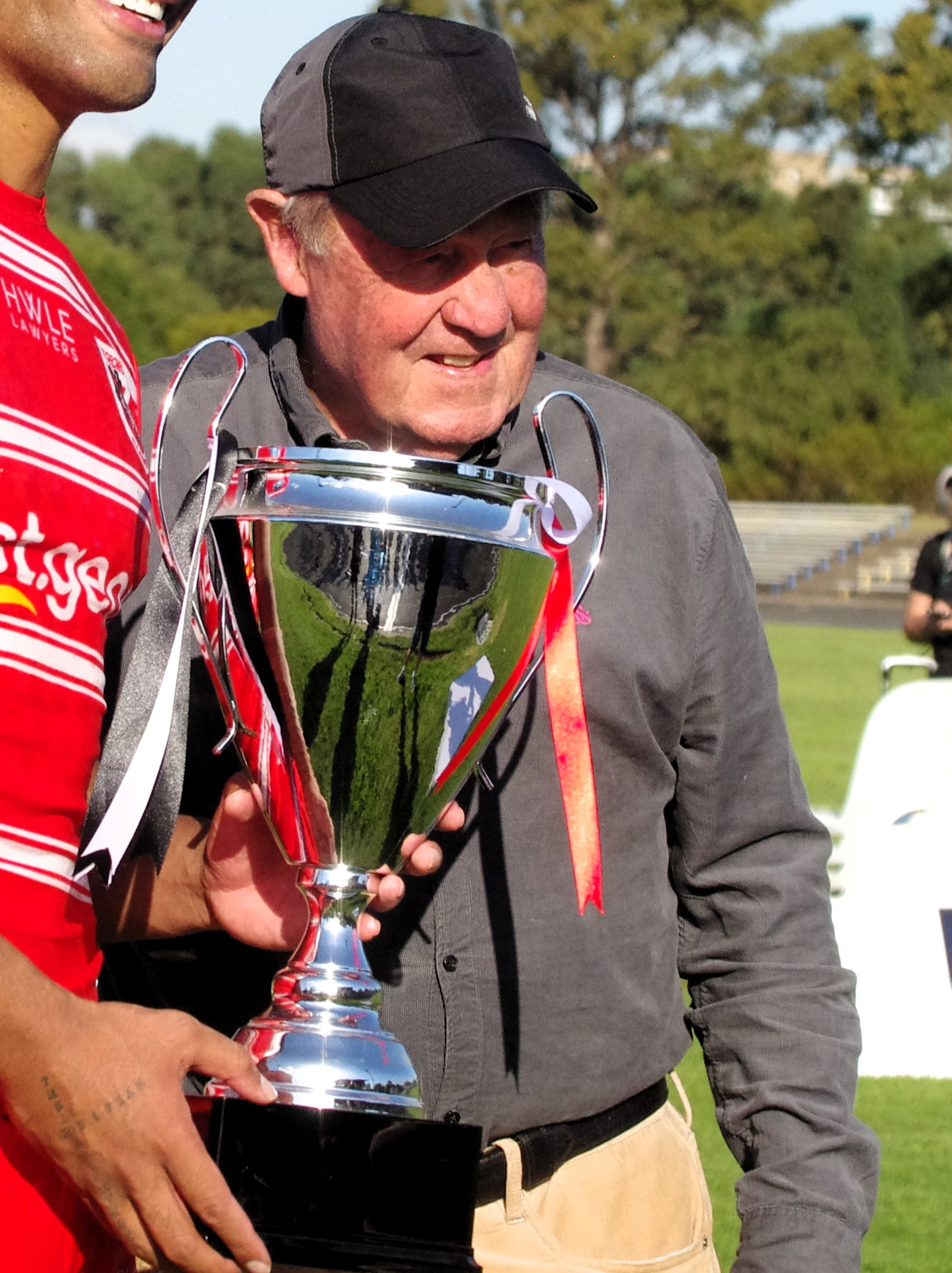

Personal information
- Full name: Roydon John Masters
- Born: 15 October 1941 (age 85); Newtown, New South Wales, Australia

Coaching information
Club
Years	Team	Gms	W	D	L	W%
1978–81	Western Suburbs	94	56	2	36	60
1982–87	St. George Dragons	156	86	8	62	55
	Total	250	142	10	98	57
- Mother: Olga Masters
- Relatives: Chris Masters (brother); Ian Masters (brother); Sue Masters (sister)

Roydon John Masters AM (born 15 October 1941) is an Australian sports journalist and former rugby league football coach. He is a sports columnist for the Sydney Morning Herald. He was a school teacher with an interest in team psychology who enjoyed some success as a schoolboy coach before embarking on a professional coaching career in the NSWRFL Premiership.

== Family and early life ==
Roy was the eldest of seven children to author and journalist Olga Masters and her school teacher husband. His siblings include current affairs journalist Chris Masters, Ian Masters, a Los Angeles radio show host, Quentin Masters, a London-based film producer, Sue Masters television Producer and Deb Masters.

== Coaching ==
Masters had little experience as a professional rugby league footballer having played country football as a hooker of "only average ability" during his early teaching years at Tweed River High. He qualified as a teacher in 1963 and following posts at Tweed River and Armidale, Masters taught at Tamworth High School and coached their rugby league side to victory in the prestigious University Shield schoolboys competition. In 1972 he was selected as coach of the inaugural Australian Schoolboys representative side which featured such future stars as Ian Schubert, Craig Young, Les Boyd and Royce Ayliffe. The side toured Great Britain, going undefeated on the tour and scoring 108 tries in their 11 games to their opponents one.

Masters' senior coaching career in the NSWRL commenced with a minor role with the Penrith Panthers in 1974 as one of five members of the coaching panel. At the time he was still a social science teacher at Doonside High School. In 1976 he shifted to the Western Suburbs Magpies to coach their under 23s side when Don Parish was the head coach.

"People say that Roy was a motivator and not a tactical coach, but that is very wrong. He was both, but he was the best motivator I played under. He was one of us. He was like a father to us all."

— −Tommy Raudonikis

In 1978 he was appointed as head coach largely due to the support of senior players Tommy Raudonikis and Les Boyd. Masters re-built the Magpies, who had been in decline since suffering three successive grand final losses to St George from 1961 to 1963. He coached the Magpies to a minor premiership in 1978 and they played with consistent high quality during this period. Many acclaimed players blossomed under his tutelage, including Boyd, John Dorahy and John "Dallas" Donnelly; while the tough, uncompromising halfback Tommy Raudonikis led the side on-field.

Masters was a master of psychology, famously terming the Western Suburbs the "fibros" (a type of asbestos sheeting commonly used in houses in the area) in contrast to their rivals of the period the Manly-Warringah Sea Eagles, whom he described as the "silvertails". This reflected both the socio-economics of the respective Sydney suburbs and the financial situations of the clubs. He created this term after a fiery exhibition match between the two sides in Melbourne when Masters was happy to spread a false rumour that the Sea Eagles had stayed at a luxury resort while Wests had to make do with a two-star hotel.

"I've been a battler all my life. I can communicate with a team like Wests. I form a close personal relationship with each of my players because I'm one of their kind." Masters said of his time at the club. Masters left Western Suburbs when it emerged that the Magpies' affiliated leagues club at Ashfield would no longer be able to support the incomes of his key "fibros" players.

Masters moved on to St. George Dragons in 1982, reaching the Grand Final in 1985 but losing to Canterbury-Bankstown 7–6. Masters is regarded as one of the finest coaches to have never won a premiership because he was seemingly able to help financially struggling clubs to perform above their ability. He was awarded the Dally M coach of the year in 1985.

In September 2004 Masters was named as coach of the Western Suburbs Magpies team of the century.

== Journalism ==
Masters is a columnist at The Sydney Morning Herald, and also appears on the ABC-TV sports panel show Offsiders. He was also a Rugby League Commentator for Channel Seven when the Seven network had the free to air TV rights for Australian Tests from 1990 to 1993.

Masters did not support Super League when it emerged in 1995 and is well known for his support for rugby league traditions. He is also respected for his analytical skill, and is highly regarded by current players, a rarity for a member of the media. Masters also covers soccer, boxing and a variety of other sports, famously criticising American jingoism at the opening ceremony of the 2002 Salt Lake City Winter Olympic Games.

He is a strong supporter of John O'Neill, the Australian Rugby Union chief executive (and former Football Federation Australia CEO) who led the federation to the 2006 FIFA World Cup. However, Masters has criticised FFA chairman Frank Lowy in a series of articles detailing Australian soccer's financial problems, in spite of the Socceroos' success at the World Cup. He questioned whether Lowy, Australia's second richest man, would repay an Australian Sports Commission loan of over A$3 million, to help develop a national league. In a letter to the Sydney Morning Herald, Lowy questioned Masters' journalistic credibility, saying among other things that Masters was a "Rugby League commentator". Masters then revealed that his great uncle James "Judy" Masters was a former captain of the Australian national team.

In 2005 Masters gave the 7th annual Tom Brock Lecture. He also made an appearance in the 2007 rugby league drama film The Final Winter. In 2012 he was appointed as a Member of the Order of Australia for services to sport and journalism.

Whilst continuing to write articles for The Sydney Morning Herald, in 2010 Masters released a book, Higher, Richer, Sleazier: How Drugs and Money Are Changing Sport Forever.

In 2011, he was awarded Australian Sports Commission Media Award for Lifetime Achievement.

== Published sources ==
- Apter, Jeff The Coaches : The Men Who Changed Rugby League (2014), The Five Mile Press Scoresby, Victoria
