= Sue Masters =

Australian television producer

Sue Masters is an Australian television producer who is currently the executive producer of drama for Special Broadcasting Service (SBS).

== Family ==
Master's mother Olga Masters was a journalist and writer. Her siblings Roy, Ian, Quentin, Chris and Deb have all been notably involved in media, television and film.

== Career ==
From 1983 to 2000, Masters worked at the Australian Broadcasting Corporation (ABC). During her career, Masters has produced and executive produced multi-award-winning drama series, including Brides of Christ, SeaChange, The Road from Coorain and Changi.

From 2000 to 2009, Masters was executive producer of Drama for Channel Ten. Under her stewardship, successful series The Secret Life of Us and White Collar Blue were commissioned.

In 2009, Masters returned to work with the ABC, and in 2014 she joined SBS.

Masters features in a 2011 Australian Story episode that details her work with members of the controversial Bra Boys "gang" Macario De Souza, Richie Vaculik and Mark Mathews.
