= Christina Pickles =

British actress (born 1935)

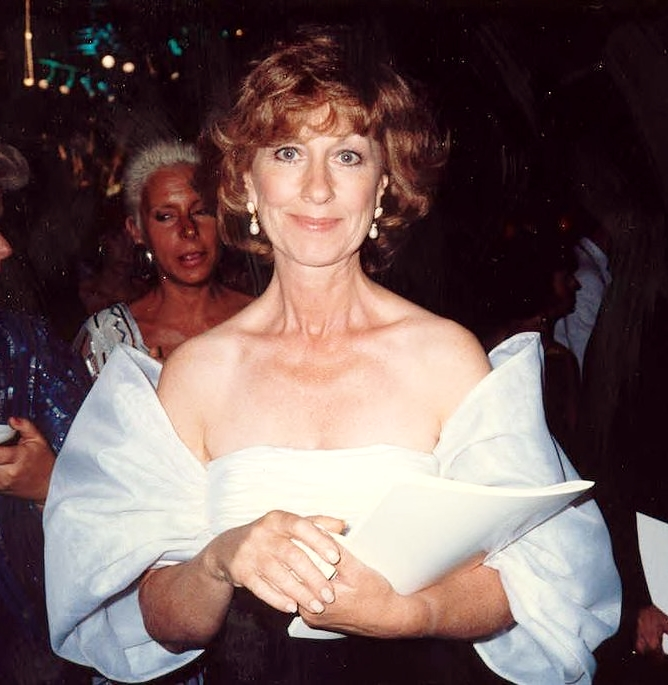
- Pickles in 1987
- Born: Christine Pickles; 17 February 1935 (age 91); Halifax, West Riding of Yorkshire, England
- Occupation: Actress
- Years active: 1961–present
- Known for: St. Elsewhere; Friends
- Spouses: Victor Lobl (m. 1962; div. 1985) Ian Masters (m. 2005)
- Partner: Herb Edelman (1984–1996, his death)
- Children: 2
- Relatives: Carolyn Pickles (niece); Wilfred Pickles (uncle); James Pickles (brother)

Christina Pickles (born 17 February 1935) is an English actress, known for her work in the United States. She is known for her role as Nurse Helen Rosenthal in the NBC medical drama St. Elsewhere (1982–1988), for which she received five nominations for the Primetime Emmy Award for Outstanding Supporting Actress in a Drama Series. She is also known for her recurring role as Judy Geller on the NBC sitcom Friends (1994, 1996–2003), for which she was nominated for the 1995 Primetime Emmy Award for Outstanding Guest Actress in a Comedy Series.

Pickles appeared in Broadway plays in the 1960s and 1970s, including The Misanthrope (1968) and Sherlock Holmes (1975), and starred on the daytime soap operas Guiding Light (1970–1972, 2007) and Another World (1977–1979). Her film appearances include Masters of the Universe (1987), Legends of the Fall (1994), Romeo + Juliet (1996), and The Wedding Singer (1998). She won the 2018 Primetime Emmy Award for Outstanding Actress in a Short Form Comedy or Drama Series for the Vimeo series Break a Hip.

== Early life ==
Christina Pickles was born in Halifax, West Riding of Yorkshire in England.

She began attending the Royal Academy of Dramatic Art in London at age 14 and studied alongside Albert Finney, Peter O’Toole, and Brian Bedford. After graduating, she moved to New York City in the late 1950s, initially living with friend and classmate Donald Moffat and his wife.

== Career ==
In 1961, Pickles began her acting career in Look Back in Anger at the Arena Stage in Washington, DC. She performed in Measure for Measure in Joe Papp’s Shakespeare in the Park, then won the lead role in George Devine's The Way of the World, despite auditioning for the maid's role. After her Broadway debut in A Severed Head in 1964, other Broadway productions followed, including Inadmissible Evidence, You Can't Take It with You, War and Peace, The Misanthrope, Hamlet, and Sherlock Holmes.

At the same time, Pickles debuted on television, playing Linell Conway on Guiding Light (1970–1972, 2007). She played Countess Elena dePoulignac on the NBC soap opera Another World (1977–1979). She appeared in such feature films as Seizure (1974) and Rush It (1977). After moving from New York City to Los Angeles, Pickles was cast as Nurse Helen Rosenthal in the NBC medical drama St. Elsewhere. The series aired from 1982 to 1988. She remained on St. Elsewhere for its entire six-year run and was nominated for five Primetime Emmy Award for Outstanding Supporting Actress in a Drama Series for her work on the series.

She later was a regular on the short-lived CBS sitcom The People Next Door, which aired in 1989. She went to appear on Family Ties, Who's the Boss?, In the Heat of the Night, Matlock, The Nanny, Murder, She Wrote, and Touched by an Angel.

From 1994 to 2003, Pickles played the recurring role of Judy Geller, the mother of Ross and Monica Geller (David Schwimmer and Courteney Cox), in the NBC sitcom Friends, making appearances throughout the 10-year run of the series. She received a Primetime Emmy Award for Outstanding Guest Actress in a Comedy Series nomination for this role in 1995. Pickles played the mother of Harmon Rabb in the CBS drama series JAG from 1998 to 2000. From 1999 to 2000, she starred in the short-lived Fox comedy-drama series Get Real.

Pickles has appeared in many films, including Masters of the Universe (1987), Revenge of the Nerds IV: Nerds in Love (1994), Legends of the Fall (1994) directed by Edward Zwick, Grace of My Heart (1996), Baz Luhrmann's Romeo + Juliet (1996), The Wedding Singer (1998), Sol Goode (2003), George of the Jungle 2 (2003), and Atlas Shrugged: Part I (2011). She has had roles in a number of made-for-television movies.

In the 2000s, Pickles appeared in a few episodes of How I Met Your Mother as Lily Aldrin's grandmother, and guest-starred on The Division, Medium, and Childrens Hospital. In 2016, she was cast in the ABC drama pilot The Death Of Eva Sofia Valdez, starring Gina Torres in a title role. In 2018, she received her seventh Emmy nomination (in category for "Outstanding Actress in a Short Form Comedy or Drama Series"), and her first in 23 years, for the comedic web series Break a Hip.

== Personal life ==
Pickles was married to producer/director Victor Lobl for 23 years, divorcing in 1985. She was romantically linked to actor Herbert Edelman, who also played her significant other on St. Elsewhere, from the mid-1980s until his death in 1996.

In 2005, she married Australian-American journalist Ian Masters.

== Filmography ==
=== Film ===
| Year | Title | Role | Notes |
|---|---|---|---|
| 1974 | Seizure | Nicole Blackstone | |
| 1978 | Rush It | Eve | |
| 1984 | It Came Upon the Midnight Clear | Chris | |
| 1987 | Masters of the Universe | Sorceress of Castle Grayskull | |
| 1989 | The Hijacking of the Achille Lauro | Charlotte | Television film |
| 1992 | Nightmare in the Daylight | Sarah Jenner | Television film |
| 1993 | A Twist of the Knife | Marilyn Cabot | Television film |
| 1994 | Revenge of the Nerds IV: Nerds in Love | Tippy | |
| 1994 | Legends of the Fall | Isabel Ludlow | |
| 1996 | Grace of My Heart | Mrs. Buxton | |
| 1996 | Romeo + Juliet | Caroline Montague | |
| 1996 | No Easy Way | Mrs. Livingston | |
| 1997 | Weapons of Mass Distraction | Mrs. Frieda Messinger | Television film |
| 1997 | The Land Before Time V: The Mysterious Island | Elsie (voice) | |
| 1998 | The Wedding Singer | Angie Sullivan | |
| 1998 | Monday After the Miracle | Kate Keller | |
| 1998 | Murder She Purred: A Mrs. Murphy Mystery | Mim Sanburne | Television film |
| 1999 | Valerie Flake | Meg Darnell | |
| 1999 | Poseidon's Fury: Escape from the Lost City | Goddess | Short film |
| 2002 | Angels Don't Sleep Here | Angela Porter | |
| 2003 | Sol Goode | Sol's Mom | |
| 2003 | George of the Jungle 2 | Beatrice Stanhope | |
| 2007 | The Family Holiday | Mrs. Pendergast | |
| 2008 | Collectibles | Narrator | |
| 2008 | Immigrants | Harriet (voice) | |
| 2009 | Flower Girl | Evangeline Walker | |
| 2011 | Atlas Shrugged: Part I | Mother Rearden | |
| 2013 | Live at the Foxes Den | Mrs. Ducksworth | |
| 2014 | Wild & Precious | Bea | Short film |

=== Television ===
| Year | Title | Role | Notes |
|---|---|---|---|
| 1970–1972, 2007 | Guiding Light | Linell Conway | Regular role |
| 1977 | The Andros Targets | Mrs. Fuller | Episode: "In the Event of My Death" |
| 1977–1979 | Another World | Countess Elena DePoulignac | Regular role; 52 episodes |
| 1981 | The White Shadow | Christine | Episode: "Psyched Out" |
| 1982 | Lou Grant | Elsa | Episode: "Suspect" |
| 1982–1988 | St. Elsewhere | Nurse Helen Rosenthal | Regular role; 123 episodes |
| 1985 | Space | Mrs. McKellar | Episodes: "Part I" and "Part III" |
| 1988 | Roseanne | Perfume Saleswoman | Episode: "We're in the Money" |
| 1988 | Family Ties | Ruth Hobart | Episodes: "Heartstrings: Parts 1 & 2" |
| 1988 | Who's the Boss? | Laura | Episode: "A Spirited Christmas" |
| 1989 | The People Next Door | Cissy MacIntyre | All 10 episodes |
| 1990 | Mancuso, F.B.I. | Judge Laura Kinney | Episode: "Daryl Ross & the Supremes" |
| 1991 | In the Heat of the Night | Dr. Lureen Allcott | Episode: "An Execution of Trust" |
| 1991 | Veronica Clare | Kelsey Horne | 3 episodes |
| 1992 | Matlock | Diana Huntington | Episodes: "The Picture: Parts 1 & 2" |
| 1992 | Laurie Hill | Mary | Episodes: "Grasshopper" and "Walter and Beverly" |
| 1994 | Love & War | Mrs. Tynan | Episode: "A Lonely Nation Turns Its Eyes to You" |
| 1994, 1996–2003 | Friends | Judy Geller | Recurring guest star; 19 episodes |
| 1994 | Sisters | Didi Poncell | Episode: "Blinders" |
| 1995 | Cybill | Betty | Episode: "As the World Turns to Crap" |
| 1995 | The Nanny | Nurse | Episode: "Close Shave" |
| 1995 | Murder, She Wrote | Susan McGregor | Episode: "Frozen Stiff" |
| 1996 | Diagnosis: Murder | Bea Michaels | Episode: "Left-Handed Murder" |
| 1998, 2000 | JAG | Trish Burnett | 3 episodes |
| 1999–2000 | Get Real | Elizabeth Parker | All 22 episodes |
| 2000 | The Wild Thornberrys | Mali (voice) | Episode: "Forget Me Not" and "Birthday Quake" |
| 2000 | Tucker | Tucker's Grandmother | Episode: "The Family Tree" |
| 2002 | As Told by Ginger | Carl's Art Teacher (voice) | Episode: "New Girl in Town" |
| 2003 | Dragnet | Helena Rosemont | Episode: "Well Endowed" |
| 2004 | The Division | Florence Hayes | Episode: "The Fall of the House of Hayes" |
| 2004 | Father of the Pride | Barbara Walters (voice) | Episode: "Larry's Debut, and Sweet Darryl Hannah Too" |
| 2006 | Medium | Mrs. Walker | Episode: "Blood Relation" |
| 2009 | Privileged | Mrs. Bennington | Episode: "All About What Lies Beneath" |
| 2009, 2011 | How I Met Your Mother | Rita | 2 episodes |
| 2011 | Retired at 35 | Judy | Episode: "The Matchmakers" |
| 2011 | Friends with Benefits | Hazel | Episode: "The Benefit of Being Shallow" |
| 2012 | Childrens Hospital | Glenn's Mom | Episode: "Ladies Night" |
| 2013 | Animal Practice | Sabrina French | Episode: "Wingmen" |
| 2014 | Growing Up Fisher | Dr. La Croix | Episode: "Secret Lives of Fishers" |
| 2014 | Rush | Mrs. Atchison | Episode: "Where Is My Mind?" |
| 2015–2018 | Break a Hip | Biz | All 16 episodes |
| 2016 | Bella and the Bulldogs | Doris Mekkena | Episode: "Bad Grandma" |
| 2017–2018 | Family Guy | Queen Elizabeth II, Additional voices | 3 episodes |
| 2017 | Great News | Mildred Marlock | 2 episodes |
| 2017 | Doubt | Gail Meyers | 3 episodes |
| 2017 | 9JKL | Lenore | Episode: "It Happened One Night" |
| 2019 | Dollface | Silvia Goldwyn | Episode: "Feminist" |
| 2021 | Friends: The Reunion | Herself | HBO Max special |
| 2021 | Tuca & Bertie | The Lighthouse Keeper (voice) | Episode: "The Flood" |

== Awards and nominations ==
| Year | Award | Category | Work | Result |
|---|---|---|---|---|
| 1983 | Primetime Emmy Award | Outstanding Supporting Actress in a Drama Series | St. Elsewhere | Nominated |
| 1985 | Primetime Emmy Award | Outstanding Supporting Actress in a Drama Series | St. Elsewhere | Nominated |
| 1986 | Primetime Emmy Award | Outstanding Supporting Actress in a Drama Series | St. Elsewhere | Nominated |
| 1987 | Primetime Emmy Award | Outstanding Supporting Actress in a Drama Series | St. Elsewhere | Nominated |
| 1988 | Primetime Emmy Award | Outstanding Supporting Actress in a Drama Series | St. Elsewhere | Nominated |
| 1995 | Primetime Emmy Award | Outstanding Guest Actress in a Comedy Series | Friends | Nominated |
| 2018 | Primetime Emmy Award | Outstanding Actress in a Short Form Comedy or Drama Series | Break a Hip: Season 2 | Won |
