= Love Island (The Morning Show) =

- The Morning Show episode
- Episode no.: Season 3 Episode 5
- Directed by: Stacie Passon
- Written by: Zander Lehmann
- Cinematography by: Tami Reiker
- Editing by: Henk Van Eeghen
- Original release date: October 4, 2023
- Running time: 53 minutes

Guest appearances
- Joe Tippett as Hal Jackson; Natalie Morales as Kate Danton; Sasha Alexander as Salma; Clive Standen as Andre Ford; Shari Belafonte as Julia; Theo Iyer as Kyle

Episode chronology
← Previous "The Green Light"	Next → "The Stanford Student"

"Love Island" is the fifth episode of the third season of the American drama television series The Morning Show, inspired by Brian Stelter's 2013 book Top of the Morning. It is the 25th overall episode of the series and was written by co-executive producer Zander Lehmann, and directed by Stacie Passon. It was released on Apple TV+ on October 4, 2023.

The series follows the characters and culture behind a network broadcast morning news program, The Morning Show. After allegations of sexual misconduct, the male co-anchor of the program, Mitch Kessler, is forced off the show. It follows Mitch's co-host, Alex Levy, and a conservative reporter Bradley Jackson, who attracts the attention of the show's producers after a viral video. In the episode, Bradley's relationship with Laura is depicted at the beginning of 2020, while also detailing Cory's relationship with his realtor.

The episode received mixed reviews from critics, who were divided by the writing and themes of the episode. For the episode, Reese Witherspoon and Karen Pittman received nominations at the 76th Primetime Emmy Awards.

== Plot ==
In March 2020, during the COVID-19 pandemic, Bradley (Reese Witherspoon) continues co-hosting the show with Laura (Julianna Margulies), who is hosting from her house in Montana. Bradley has also informed Cory (Billy Crudup) that despite his love confession, she is just interested in being his friend, devastating him.

Bradley later moves to Montana to stay with Laura at her house. They co-host the show together, raising rumors about their possible relationship. which they later confirm during a broadcast. They report many events such as the summer wildfires, the lockdowns in Pennsylvania, and Ruth Bader Ginsburg's death. While they can enjoy time together, Bradley is offended that Laura does not believe her family is a good influence on her. Some time later, Bradley is devastated to learn that her mother died from COVID and gets into a heated argument with Laura. When Laura insults her mother, Bradley decides to leave the house.

Cory looks to buy a house in the Hamptons and ends up dating his realtor, Salma (Sasha Alexander). She in turn introduces him to his neighbor, Paul Marks (Jon Hamm). Needing content for UBA+, he convinces Stella (Greta Lee) to air the documentary with Mitch's last interview, despite her protests. Mia (Karen Pittman) spends time with her boyfriend, Andre (Clive Standen), but they get into an argument over the toxic nature of the network. This prompts Andre to ignore COVID protocols and go to a bar, forcing her to sleep at the station. Later, Andre announces that he will leave for a project in Afghanistan, upsetting her.

Bradley moves to Washington, D.C. to report the 2020 presidential election. She is in the Capitol on January 6, 2021, when a mob forces its way inside. As she records the events, she is shocked to find Hal (Joe Tippett) as one of the protestors. She takes him to her hotel room, confronting him as he could face life in prison for attacking an officer. Hal confesses that his girlfriend is pregnant, prompting Bradley to delete the video showing Hal in the Capitol. She delivers the rest of the material to Stella, but the FBI requests all of the video footage. She visits Cory at his house to explain that she had to delete Hal's video. An angry Cory agrees to cover for her to the FBI by giving them pre-existing videos, but coldly dismisses her from his house.

== Development ==
=== Production ===
The episode was written by co-executive producer Zander Lehmann, and directed by Stacie Passon. This was Lehmann's first writing credit, and Passon's first directing credit.

== Critical reviews ==
"Love Island" received mixed reviews from critics. Max Gao of The A.V. Club gave the episode a "C+" grade and wrote, "Given that TMS is such a timely show, it isn't surprising that the show's creative team would attempt to recreate an event like the Capitol attack (albeit on a much smaller scale), but it doesn't make it any less jarring to watch two and a half years later."

Maggie Fremont of Vulture gave the episode a 3 star rating out of 5 and wrote, "No one asked for this. This?! To relive one of the bleakest swathes of time in recent memory? It is the hardest of passes, okay? And I'm not just talking about how this rewind to March 2020 and the year that followed means we're diving into the first few chaotic, terrifying months of a global pandemic, George Floyd's murder and the reckoning that followed, and January 6th, 2021 — but The Morning Show, who just can't help itself it seems, peppers in fun reminders of other terrible things going on at the time as a little treat, like ravaging wildfires and Ruth Bader Ginsburg's death. It's like, we get it, it was awful. Please do not force us to go back there again. We just got out. No one asked for this." Kimberly Roots of TVLine wrote, "When you think about it, the big revelation on this week's The Morning Show makes perfect sense. Of COURSE Hal was dumb enough to get so caught up in anti-Biden sentiment that he stormed the United States Capitol on Jan. 6, 2021. And, because he's Hal, of COURSE he got caught beating up a law-enforcement officer. If there's a bad choice to be made, Hal's your guy."

Nicole Gallucci of Decider wrote, "Don't get me wrong, I 1000% want to see what happens to Bradley, Hal, and the network after this damning Episode 5 reveal. I'm not done with this wild insurrection storyline yet. All I'm asking — nay, all I'm begging — is that we keep it in the present from now on, and that any future flashback episodes on the show consider omitting the worst year of many of our lives." Lacy Baugher of Telltale TV gave the episode a 3.5 star rating out of 5 and wrote, "Despite the fact that The Morning Show is really a very expensive soap opera — and honestly works so much better that way — the show still goes through these bizarre phases where it wants to do nothing more than cosplay as a Very Serious Drama that Wrestles with Real Life Issues, even though it is absolutely not the kind of show that is equipped to tell those kinds of stories in a nuanced (or often even coherent) way."

=== Accolades ===
TVLine named Reese Witherspoon and Julianna Margulies the "Performer of the Week" for the week of October 7, 2023, for their performances in the episode. The site wrote, "Witherspoon's declaration that Laura actually hated, not loved Bradley, was painful in its brokenness. Margulies' raised voice and indignant scowl as she countered that it was actually Bradley who loathed her mom made it clear that Laura was done being a punching bag. We're still smarting from the A-listers' work in the brutally good scene."

Reese Witherspoon submitted the episode to support her nomination for Outstanding Lead Actress in a Drama Series, while Karen Pittman submitted it for her nomination for Outstanding Supporting Actress in a Drama Series at the 76th Primetime Emmy Awards. Witherspoon would lose to Anna Sawai for Shōgun, while Pittman would lose to Elizabeth Debicki for The Crown.
