= Ghost in the Machine (The Morning Show) =

- The Morning Show episode
- Episode no.: Season 3 Episode 2
- Directed by: Mimi Leder
- Written by: Michelle Denise Jackson
- Cinematography by: John Grillo
- Editing by: Plummy Tucker
- Original release date: September 13, 2023
- Running time: 49 minutes

Guest appearances
- Holland Taylor as Cybil Reynolds; Hannah Leder as Isabella; Shari Belafonte as Julia; Victoria Tate as Rena Robinson; Andrea Bendewald as Valérie; Tara Karsian as Gayle Berman; Eli Bildner as Joel Rapkin; Amber Friendly as Layla Bell; Mike Ostroski as Victor; Clive Standen as Andre Ford; Maria Canals-Barrera as Mercedes; Joe Marinelli as Donny Spagnoli; Choni Francis as RJ Smith; Aflamu Johnson as Aflamu; Joe Pacheco as Bart Daley; Theo Iyer as Kyle; Jack Conley as Earl; Will Arnett as Doug Klassen; Stephen Fry as Leonard Cromwell

Episode chronology
← Previous "The Kármán Line"	Next → "White Noise"

"Ghost in the Machine" is the second episode of the third season of the American drama television series The Morning Show, inspired by Brian Stelter's 2013 book Top of the Morning. It is the 22nd overall episode of the series and was written by producer Michelle Denise Jackson, and directed by executive producer Mimi Leder. It was released on Apple TV+ on September 13, 2023, airing back-to-back with the previous episode, "The Kármán Line".

The series follows the characters and culture behind a network broadcast morning news program, The Morning Show. After allegations of sexual misconduct, the male co-anchor of the program, Mitch Kessler, is forced off the show. It follows Mitch's co-host, Alex Levy, and a liberal reporter Bradley Jackson, who attracts the attention of the show's producers after a viral video. In the episode, UBA becomes victim of a cyberattack, while Cory fights for the merger.

The episode received positive reviews from critics, who praised the character development and performances. For the episode, Billy Crudup won Outstanding Supporting Actor in a Drama Series at the 76th Primetime Emmy Awards.

== Plot ==
As the TMS staff work to gain back the connection to the shuttle, the signal finally comes back after a few seconds off the air. After the flight, they land safely on Earth. However, Paul (Jon Hamm) is upset with Cory (Billy Crudup) for Alex (Jennifer Aniston) abandoning them, and that the public perception of the rocket will be negative due to the signal loss.

Returning to New York, Alex informs Cybil (Holland Taylor) about Cory's deal with Paul. She is shocked, and promises to take a look into it, while pretending to be on Cory's side over suspending Alex for abandoning the flight. During the show's broadcast, the staff finds that their systems are not working and have been locked inside the cabin, forcing Chip (Mark Duplass) to smash the door. The lights on the building go out, forcing affiliates to pick up the rest of air time. They come to realize that it is a massive cyberattack, with the hackers request $50 million ransom so the extracted confidential information of the employees would not spill further into the Internet.

Cory attends a board meeting to discuss the cyberattack; Cory suggests paying the $50 million as the potential damage can exceed their losses, but Cybil refuses to engage out of fear of losing advertisers. The board agrees with Cybil's proposition, and she also warns him that any buyout has to go through the whole board, upsetting him. As news of the cyberattack will be reported soon, Stella asks Bradley (Reese Witherspoon) to inform it during the evening news edition.

Arriving home, Alex is shocked when she finds Chip and Isabella (Hannah Leder) almost having sex. They reiterate that they informed HR about their decision, and that it is consensual. As Bradley reports the cyberattack, Corey and Stella stay at their office to drink and discuss their frustrations. Inspired by their conversation, Cory has Earl (Jack Conley) leak a report documenting the potential merger with Paul Marks.

== Development ==
=== Production ===
The episode was written by producer Michelle Denise Jackson, and directed by executive producer Mimi Leder. This was Jackson's first writing credit, and Leder's ninth directing credit.

== Critical reviews ==
"Ghost in the Machine" received positive reviews from critics. Max Gao of The A.V. Club gave the episode a "B" grade and wrote, "Stella gets her phone back and just so happens to find a picture of her and Marks when they were younger, suggesting that they were once professionally or romantically linked!?"

Maggie Fremont of Vulture gave the episode a 4 star rating out of 5 and wrote, "Maybe the key to making a chaotic show work is to purposefully toss all of its characters into absolute chaos. The Morning Show is never better than when everyone is in total crisis mode, stomping around the building, screaming “What is going on?!” at each other, and barfing in the bathroom — and that is exactly how we find our little UBA babes in “Ghost in the Machine,” when the company is under cyber attack." Kimberly Roots of TVLine wrote, "This iteration of The Morning Show, under new showrunner Charlotte Stoudt, is unafraid to go big, bold and bats–t. Watching it is a profoundly enjoyable experience."

Lacy Baugher of Telltale TV gave the episode a 4 star rating out of 5 and wrote, "The first two episodes are wildly ridiculous in places, the show still has too many characters, and stars Jennifer Anniston and Reese Witherspoon don't share the screen enough for my taste. But suddenly watching The Morning Show no longer feels like homework. The prospect of next week's episode is actually kind of thrilling. And when's the last time we were able to say any of that?" Carissa Pavlica of TV Fanatic gave the episode a 4.25 star rating out of 5 rating and wrote, "Just when you think that there isn't any good TV to sink your teeth into, The Morning Show returns with everything we've been craving. We can't wait to see what's next."

=== Accolades ===
Billy Crudup submitted the episode to support his nomination for Outstanding Supporting Actor in a Drama Series at the 76th Primetime Emmy Awards. He would win the award, becoming his second win for the series.
