= White Noise (The Morning Show) =

- The Morning Show episode
- Episode no.: Season 3 Episode 3
- Directed by: Thomas Carter
- Written by: Joshua Allen
- Cinematography by: Tami Reiker
- Editing by: J. Kathleen Gibson
- Original release date: September 20, 2023
- Running time: 53 minutes

Guest appearances
- Holland Taylor as Cybil Reynolds; Tig Notaro as Amanda Robinson; Hannah Leder as Isabella; June Diane Raphael as Ashley Andrews; Alano Miller as Marcus Hunter; Maria Canals-Barrera as Mercedes; Jack Conley as Earl; Victoria Tate as Rena Robinson; Shari Belafonte as Julia; Eli Bildner as Joel Rapkin; Amber Friendly as Layla Bell; Joe Marinelli as Donny Spagnoli; Aflamu Johnson as Aflamu; Theo Iyer as Kyle; Stephen Fry as Leonard Cromwell

Episode chronology
← Previous "Ghost in the Machine"	Next → "The Green Light"

"White Noise" is the third episode of the third season of the American drama television series The Morning Show, inspired by Brian Stelter's 2013 book Top of the Morning. It is the 23rd overall episode of the series and was written by co-executive producer Joshua Allen, and directed by Thomas Carter. It was released on Apple TV+ on September 20, 2023.

The series follows the characters and culture behind a network broadcast morning news program, The Morning Show. After allegations of sexual misconduct, the male co-anchor of the program, Mitch Kessler, is forced off the show. It follows Mitch's co-host, Alex Levy, and a conservative reporter Bradley Jackson, who attracts the attention of the show's producers after a viral video. In the episode, the UBA leaks build tensions on set, as Cybil gets involved after a remark surfaces.

The episode received positive reviews from critics, who praised the themes and performances. For the episode, Nicole Beharie and Holland Taylor received nominations for Outstanding Supporting Actress in a Drama Series at the 76th Primetime Emmy Awards.

== Plot ==
The UBA leaks are reported by the news media, which highlight a toxic environment. One of the e-mails revolves around Cybil (Holland Taylor) comparing new co-host Christine Hunter (Nicole Beharie) with Aunt Jemima, leading to tensions on set. The staff is also frustrated when they realize that non-white employees are paid less than white employees.

Cory (Billy Crudup) calls Paul (Jon Hamm) to maintain that his initial offer is still standing, hoping the leaks can convince the board to approve it. He also tries to get Christine patient on the situation by offering her a bonus, but she turns it down, and demands an on-air interview with Cybil over the e-mail. Cybil asks Alex (Jennifer Aniston) to help her, but she refuses. Nevertheless, Alex convinces Cory and Stella (Greta Lee) in getting the interview take place in Alex Unfiltered. But Christine convinces them in changing the interview so it can take place in The Morning Show.

Stella meets with the staff to discuss the aftermath of the e-mails, but the meeting fails when Yanko (Néstor Carbonell) criticizes the racial views of some of his colleagues. Afterwards, Mia (Karen Pittman) and Stella go drinking and drunkenly admit to each other they think Yanko is hot. During the interview, Cybil apologizes for her remarks and maintains the network will be more strict, but Christine challenges her view as the comment could fall to anyone in the staff. Cybil suddenly declares that she should be grateful for getting the co-host position, ruining her image.

After the interview, Cybil loses her position through a no confidence vote and is replaced by Leonard Cromwell (Stephen Fry). This delights Cory, who now can get the merger to go through without her interference. That night, he visits Paul at a private event in SoHo to inform him that the board approved the decision. However, Paul surprises him by pulling back on his offer, as UBA's toxic environment changed his mind. A shaken Cory leaves and walks off.

== Development ==
=== Production ===
The episode was written by co-executive producer Joshua Allen, and directed by Thomas Carter. This was Allen's first writing credit, and Carter's first directing credit.

== Critical reviews ==
"White Noise" received positive reviews from critics. Max Gao of The A.V. Club gave the episode a "B+" grade and wrote, "Let's be honest: Who really thought it was a good idea to acquire a media conglomerate that has managed to be the news more than report on the news for the last three years? We all know he'll come back to the table at some point. After all, the writers and producers wouldn't get an actor of Jon Hamm's stature to guest star in only a couple of episodes. But if Paul had any good business sense, he would stay as far away from UBA as possible."

Maggie Fremont of Vulture gave the episode a 3 star rating out of 5 and wrote, "I'm glad that The Morning Show is having a little more fun with the absurdity of it all this season. That transition from the story about long-lost twins finding each other during a pie eating contest to “up next, a conversation about race in corporate America” is a perfectly crafted doozy, and both Alex and Yanko look worn out after trying to manage that “fucking tough pivot.”" Kimberly Roots of TVLine wrote, "At least the network's systematically racist pay structure is exposed, and Chris looks like an absolute boss as she deftly navigates a situation she never should have been thrown into in the first place. But still, ugh."

Lacy Baugher of Telltale TV gave the episode a 4 star rating out of 5 and wrote, "Given that The Morning Show cast Jon Hamm to play Marks, there's absolutely no way this is the end of this plot and somehow Cory is 100% going to figure out a way to get what he wants in the end. But it sure is satisfying to watch him get taken down a peg for once and, honestly, he probably deserves worse." Carissa Pavlica of TV Fanatic gave the episode a 4.5 star rating out of 5 rating and wrote, ""White Noise" was a tour de force that showcased the deep bench of talent on this series, from the writing staff to the actors bringing the stories to life."

=== Accolades ===
Nicole Beharie and Holland Taylor both submitted the episode to support their nomination for Outstanding Supporting Actress in a Drama Series at the 76th Primetime Emmy Awards. They would both lose to Elizabeth Debicki for The Crown.
