= The Green Light (The Morning Show) =

- The Morning Show episode
- Episode no.: Season 3 Episode 4
- Directed by: Tucker Gates
- Written by: Kimi Howl Lee
- Cinematography by: John Grillo
- Editing by: Bjørn T. Myrholt
- Original release date: September 27, 2023
- Running time: 52 minutes

Guest appearances
- Retta as Herself; Hannah Leder as Isabella; Fortune Feimster as Herself; Tom Irwin as Fred Micklen; Clive Standen as Andre Ford; Choni Francis as RJ Smith; Theo Iyer as Kyle; Anthony DeVito as Coney Island Vendor; Stephen Fry as Leonard Cromwell

Episode chronology
← Previous "White Noise"	Next → "Love Island"

"The Green Light" is the fourth episode of the third season of the American drama television series The Morning Show, inspired by Brian Stelter's 2013 book Top of the Morning. It is the 24th overall episode of the series and was written by Kimi Howl Lee, and directed by Tucker Gates. It was released on Apple TV+ on September 27, 2023.

The series follows the characters and culture behind a network broadcast morning news program, The Morning Show. After allegations of sexual misconduct, the male co-anchor of the program, Mitch Kessler, is forced off the show. It follows Mitch's co-host, Alex Levy, and a conservative reporter Bradley Jackson, who attracts the attention of the show's producers after a viral video. In the episode, Alex tries to get Paul to accept Cory's offer, while Cory and Stella try to match the network's ad buy for a loan.

The episode received mixed reviews from critics, particularly for the pacing. For the episode, Jon Hamm and Greta Lee received nominations at the 76th Primetime Emmy Awards.

== Plot ==
Cory (Billy Crudup) participates in the Upfronts, an advertising buy party hosted by comediennes who make jokes about racism and same-sex relationships to the groans of the audiences. Despite Cory's confidence, his associates inform him that since Q1 revenue is down 23% year to date and 48% of the revenue comes from advertising, UBA must match the previous year's ad buy or they won't underwrite the loan.

When Alex (Jennifer Aniston) complains that Alex Unfiltered was not prioritized during the event, Cory finally reveals that the deal with Paul (Jon Hamm) fell through. She apologizes for abandoning the flight, and decides to win Paul back by taking him to an amusement park in Coney Island. During this, Cory hosts a party at his house in the Hamptons, where Bradley (Reese Witherspoon) and Laura (Julianna Margulies) meet to catch up about their recent events. Stella (Greta Lee) also meets with Cory's associates to negotiate a lucrative deal. The associates agree to a $200,000 per spot ad buy, but only if Stella forces their waitress to lick up a spilled drink on the table, to which she reluctantly agrees. Following the incident, Stella guiltily texts Cory that the loan was successful.

Mia (Karen Pittman) is contacted by her boyfriend, Andre Ford (Clive Standen), who is staying in Ukraine and tries to bring vital information for UBA. While he obtains evidence that Russian military men are killing civilians, he asks her to delay the news until he safely leaves, which she agrees. Stella finds out about the news, and convinces Mia to let UBA run the exclusive, despite it putting Andre's safety in jeopardy. Alex tries to get Paul to re-consider Cory's offer, but he is not interested. However, he comes to defend Alex when a vendor calls her out for Mitch's death, and is surprised when he finds that Alex is willing to let people yell anything at her.

At the party, Cory runs into Fred (Tom Irwin), who reveals that he works for Sloan Management, Cory's new loan provider, meaning that Cory will have to report to Fred, much to his chagrin. Unwilling to work again with Fred, Cory tells Stella he will find a different loan. Suddenly, a helicopter lands on the beach behind the house. When the passengers are revealed to be Alex and Paul, Cory is delighted.

== Development ==
=== Production ===
The episode was written by Kimi Howl Lee, and directed by Tucker Gates. This was Lee's first writing credit, and Gates' third directing credit.

== Critical reviews ==
"The Green Light" received mixed reviews from critics. Max Gao of The A.V. Club gave the episode a "C+" grade and wrote, "[Alex has] been around long enough to know that any kind of systemic change will take a long time, so how much change will be "enough" for her to realistically move on from this hellhole? At this point, I don't even know if the show has the answer to that abstract question yet."

Maggie Fremont of Vulture gave the episode a 3 star rating out of 5 and wrote, "Whoever made the decision to use "Stayin' Alive" as the song playing over Cory's manic stroll backstage of UBA Upfronts deserves a major pat on the back. It is both chaotic and obvious and it made me cackle. It is so perfectly on the nose in the most Morning Show way. I will not elaborate on that — if you watch this show, you know exactly what I mean."

Nicole Gallucci of Decider wrote, "As was often true with Succession, the already squirm-worthy reality gets even worse when Cory learns Fred is tied to the loan, he’ll have to find the capital elsewhere, and Stella's trip to the dark side was essentially for nothing. Instead of a dramatic swelling of Succession strings, a morally defeated Stella walks out to Lizzo’s “Truth Hurts,” but the aftertaste is just as bitter." Lacy Baugher of Telltale TV gave the episode a 4 star rating out of 5 and wrote, "The Morning Show Season 3 Episode 4, “The Green Light,” isn't as tensely dramatic as last week's installment, choosing to chronicle the messy drama of UBA's annual network Upfronts event rather than wrestling with the long-tail impact of racism in legacy media."

=== Accolades ===
Jon Hamm submitted the episode to support his nomination for Outstanding Supporting Actor in a Drama Series, while Greta Lee submitted it for her nomination for Outstanding Supporting Actress in a Drama Series at the 76th Primetime Emmy Awards. Hamm would lose to his co-star Billy Crudup, while Lee would lose to Elizabeth Debicki for The Crown.
