= List of St. Elsewhere characters =

This is a list of characters from the medical drama St. Elsewhere.

== Staff and doctors of St. Eligius ==
=== Introduced in Season 1 ===
==== Stayed entire series ====
===== Dr. Donald Westphall =====
Portrayed by Ed Flanders (regular cast member, 1982–1987; recurring appearances, 1987–1988)

Kindly Dr. Donald Westphall was Director of Medicine at St. Eligius, the hospital where St. Elsewhere was set, and was one of the two principal characters of the series. He was the person other characters went to for a kindly word and a pat on the back – although he also displayed flashes of anger, and was fully capable of dressing down anyone who he thought was not performing up to their best level. Dr. Westphall started his association with the hospital as a troubled youth under the influence of hospital founder Fr. Joseph McCabe (Edward Herrmann). Raising two children alone after the death of his wife Maureen from a car crash, which occurred seven years before the series began (a death recounted in flashback in the 2-part season 4 episode "Time Heals"), Westphall struggled to keep up with the demands his colleagues, staff and residents placed on him, while still trying to be a good father. He initially resigned in 1985 and travelled to Africa to do some volunteer work. However, upon his return from Africa, he was brought back as Director of Medicine. During his second stint, Westphall became noticeably more demanding on the residents and the hospital board. He pushed for residents to complete community service and asked for funds to open a new hospital ward that would feed the hungry. Once again feeling burnt out and pressured by the new hospital owners, Westphall quit his job and left the hospital three episodes into Season 6. His delivery of his resignation (in which he told John Gideon, "You can kiss my ass, pal") is one of the most famous and controversial scenes in American television, as it shows Westphall with his pants down and his rump exposed. The scene was preserved by NBC censors as it was not considered erotic (the episode was titled "A Moon for the Misbegotten"). Westphall made recurring appearances during that 6th and final season, including the series finale in which he was asked to take charge of St. Eligius again; he also appeared in that episode's famous final scene, which suggested that the entire world of St. Elsewhere was, in fact, just the product of his autistic son Tommy's imagination.

===== Dr. Mark Craig =====
Portrayed by William Daniels

Irritable and irascible, Dr. Mark Craig was the hospital's lone superstar, who was also another principal character of the series. An arrogant but brilliant heart surgeon, Craig's tenure with the hospital went back to the 1950s when he was an intern under the similarly intolerant Dr. David Domedion (Jackie Cooper). Feeling he was too good for St. Eligius, he initially took a position at rival Boston General. However, he was lured back to St. Eligius in the mid-1960s with the promise of high-tech equipment and a higher salary. While he could have left at any time after that, he chose not to and stayed on to act as mentor to and tormentor of the hospital's young doctors, especially to his protege Dr. Victor Ehrlich. Dr. Craig did not hesitate to toss a bullying and sarcastic barb at any doctor, nurse, administrator or patient who happened to pass his way — although when it came to his professional duties, he was undeniably excellent, and just as demanding of himself as he was of everyone else. Craig's celebrity status and exposure should have been boosted when he performed a heart transplant on Eve Leighton (Marian Mercer). Though the transplant was initially successful, Leighton died from complications of the surgery. A few years later, Dr. Craig developed an artificial heart (the "Craig 9000"), which he eventually tested on a human subject. The failure of the heart brought a fleeting moment of self-reflection to the otherwise supremely confident doctor. In one of St. Elsewhere's most compelling moments, Dr. Craig witnessed the autopsy of his only son, Steven (Scott Paulin), from whom he had been estranged due to his own autocratic ways and his son's drug abuse. Holding his son's heart, Dr. Craig spoke tenderly of the times when he used to read Green Eggs and Ham to his son. Together, he says, the two would read the final lines of the book. Mark Craig was #41 in TV Guide's 1999 ranking of the "50 Greatest TV Characters of All Time." Daniels appeared in 129 of the series' 137 episodes, more than anyone else.

===== Dr. Daniel Auschlander =====
Portrayed by Norman Lloyd (recurring 1982–1983; main cast 1983–1988); James Stephens as young Daniel in "Time Heals" episode, 1985

Dr. Daniel Auschlander was the Chief of Services at St. Eligius, and had ties to the hospital from its very beginning. Fair and kind, he was well thought of by nearly everyone at St. Eligius. He was the most approachable of the three administrators because he was not uptight and serious like Dr. Westphall and not abrasive or intolerant like Dr. Craig. He had been diagnosed with metastatic liver cancer shortly before the series began, and his long-term survival was not expected. However, he underwent an intensive course of chemotherapy during season 2 and into season 3, which sent his cancer into remission. He often served as a confidant and mentor to Westphall as well as, occasionally, to Craig. In a flashback episode, it was revealed that during his early years at the hospital, he had faced serious prejudice for being Jewish. He had also first met his wife, Katherine (Devon Ericson in the flashback; Jane Wyatt throughout the series), while working at the hospital. Their marriage was portrayed as a very strong one throughout the series. During season 5, it was revealed that, before meeting Katherine, Dr. Auschlander had a child with a former flame, Margaret (Geraldine Fitzgerald), who gave it up for adoption and never told him. In season 6, Auschlander finally met his son (Lawrence Pressman) who decided it would be best not to stay in contact. Auschlander was on the verge of facilitating a deal in which the Boston diocese would buy back the hospital and bring Dr. Westphall back as administrator. However, a severe stroke (not related to his cancer) finally claimed his life in the final episode.

===== Nurse Helen Rosenthal =====
Portrayed by Christina Pickles

A head nurse on a ward, Helen was caring and extremely competent, and was one of the most senior nurses at St. Eligius. She always kept things running smoothly, despite staffing shortages, general chaos, and a computer system which seemed to be always malfunctioning. Helen developed breast cancer during the first season and underwent a mastectomy (in what was one of television's first dramatic breast cancer storylines). Helen had been married four times, but during a nurses' strike during season 3, began an affair with the union mediator, Richard Clarendon (Herbert Edelman), which ultimately led to the end of her fourth marriage. (Her relationship with Richard continued for the remainder of the series.) She briefly transferred to the ER during the latter part of season 3, but ultimately decided she preferred the ward, and returned, despite the fact that Lucy Papandreo had taken over the head nurse position. Rosenthal and Papandreo battled bitterly for the better part of two seasons, before Rosenthal was promoted to Director of Nurses in Training. A prescription pill addiction during the final season nearly ended her nursing career, but after receiving treatment in St. Eligius' Chemical Dependency Unit, she was reinstated to her position. She was especially close friends with Westphall; indeed, she was the only non-physician at the hospital on a first-name basis with Drs. Westphall, Craig, and Auschlander.

===== Dr. Victor Ehrlich =====
Portrayed by Ed Begley, Jr.

Gangly and flippant, with a penchant for wearing aloha shirts with ties, Ehrlich was regarded as a talented physician but an annoying individual who frequently boasted to his colleagues that he was a Californian who had studied medicine at Berkeley. Ehrlich was self-absorbed, insensitive and a brown-noser (A catchphrase among his colleagues during early seasons was "You're a pig, Ehrlich!") He was disliked by most because of his incessant misplaced wisecracks. Though his mentor and idol, Dr. Craig, secretly thought Ehrlich to be a promising and gifted young surgeon, the very conservative Craig disliked Ehrlich's loud clothes and flip personality and vilified Ehrlich in the OR and around the hospital; Ehrlich, in turn, became especially clumsy and awkward whenever Craig was nearby. Bad luck seemed to follow Ehrlich around, including during his first solo surgery, when an armed, pregnant woman (Judith Light) took the surgical team hostage. Ehrlich and Wayne Fiscus were close friends, though their friendship was tested when they attempted to become roommates; they also competed to win over nurse Shirley Daniels, whom Ehrlich asked out, but who ended up dating Fiscus instead. Ehrlich was briefly married during season two to a young and equally neurotic candystriper named Roberta (Jean Bruce Scott), a marriage that ended within weeks. In one of the show's occasionally comedic moments, Roberta, oblivious to the fact that the hospital Public Address system was still on, confided to a colleague about her sex life and marital problems with Ehrlich. He matured as the series went on, and during season 5, he agreed to accompany Lucy Papandreo to a family gathering as her date; Victor and Lucy began dating, and eventually married toward the end of season 5. Lucy became pregnant in season 6 but ultimately miscarried. Ehrlich originally believed that he was an orphan. His parents died in an auto accident when he was 5 years old and he was raised by his aunt (Louise Lasser). However, during season 5, Ehrlich found out that his parents were still alive. At the Oliver Twist banquet awards, he was visited by his long-lost parents (Steve Allen and Jayne Meadows Allen) who were actually government spies. Later in life, Dr. Ehrlich moved to Baltimore, where he was seen trying to save the life of mayoral candidate Al Giardello in the 2000 finale to the television series Homicide: Life on the Street.

===== Dr. Jack "Boomer" Morrison =====
Portrayed by David Morse

Tall and blond, soft-voiced and often too compassionate, Jack Morrison (nicknamed "Boomer") was occasionally accused of becoming so involved in his patients' cases that he could not objectively treat them. (His competency was often questioned even by those senior doctors who most admired his big-heartedness.) Jack had a difficult time early on, juggling his home life with the demands of being a first-year resident. His troubles were exacerbated by the sudden death of his wife Nina (Deborah White) early in season 2 (Nina's heart was transplanted into a patient of Dr. Craig's), leaving Morrison alone to care for his infant son Pete while trying to keep up with his residency. By the end of his first year of residency, Morrison was cut. However, Dr. Armstrong's death had freed up a spot and Dr. Westphall decided to bring him back. He subsequently dated an independent young woman, Clancy Williams (Helen Hunt), though their relationship eventually ended. He also had to endure a number of professional setbacks, particularly when he was forced to acknowledge that the presumed "accelerated" track he took at a Mexican medical school was not entirely legal, effectively disqualifying him from being a physician; he was forced to complete all the course work he had not done in medical school, while still keeping up with his residency. During season 4, Morrison was assigned to work in a prison's medical office as part of Westphall's community outreach program, only to be raped by a male prisoner in the midst of a riot. The incident so traumatized Morrison that he was sent home to Seattle and did not reappear for the rest of that season (his absence was done to accommodate actor David Morse's request to take time off from the series to film the 1987 movie Personal Foul). Jack married again (to Joanne McFadden (Patricia Wettig)) during season 5, though he contemplated a fling with Carol Novino during the series' final few episodes. During the ceremony it is revealed that Jack's full name is John Steinbeck Morrison, a nod to the author. He ultimately decided in the finale to instead leave Boston and move back to Seattle to be with Joanne, who had moved back there earlier in the final season.

===== Dr. Wayne Fiscus =====
Portrayed by Howie Mandel

Known initially as much for his clownish behavior and unorthodox methods (including, for a time, eschewing a solid white hospital lab coat in favor of a Boston Red Sox jersey) as for his clinical skills, Fiscus nevertheless was regarded as a first-rate ER doctor, always able to treat even the worst emergency patients. He had a love-hate relationship with Dr. Westphall and later Dr. Gideon. Westphall believed he was a skilled doctor but felt that Fiscus was immature and spent too much time chasing women. Fiscus made a bad first impression on Gideon by lying to him about a patient's status. He got suspended for putting superglue all over Gideon's desk as a prank on his 30th birthday. He enjoyed a fling with ER nurse Shirley Daniels, though their relationship ended when Fiscus had sex with pathology resident Cathy Martin (whom he'd already had an affair with shortly after arriving at St. Eligius). Fiscus also tried to seduce Dr. Cavanero. Despite his flirtatious nature, he had a close friendship with Jacqueline Wade. He was also briefly engaged to an OR nurse named Mona (Leah Ayres), but their relationship eventually ended. Wayne was accidentally shot and briefly died before being resurrected during surgery (season 5's "After Life"); the incident led him to reassess his life and moderate his juvenile ways. As he matured, Fiscus eventually became something of a mentor to some of the more junior residents, particularly Elliot Alexrod. Following the completion of his residency, he relocated to Nicaragua to work in a field hospital.

===== Dr. Phillip Chandler =====
Portrayed by Denzel Washington

Capable and motivated, Phil Chandler seemed more mature and focused than many of his colleagues (particularly Fiscus and Ehrlich). Initially he was a history major at Yale University with plans of becoming a history professor. However, his father pressured him to change his major to pre-med and become a physician. Chandler was very confident in his medical skills and diagnoses, sometimes to the point of coming off as arrogant to anyone who disagreed with him. Growing up in an African-American family in an affluent suburb of Cleveland, Shaker Heights, he suffered something of an identity crisis (once describing himself as being "too white for his black friends, but too black to be accepted by his white friends"), and this was particularly apparent in his interactions with some of the hospital's African-American nursing and support staff (most notably orderly Luther Hawkins and nurse Eleanor Skilling (Vivian Bonnell)). He briefly dated a young physical therapist (Rosanne Katon) during season 2, but she quickly found him to be stiff and pompous. Chandler began dating Dr. Roxanne Turner during season 4, and they remained together for the remainder of the series.

Chandler was named Chief Resident during the final year of his residency. As Chief Resident, he helped Dr. Gideon implement many changes in the hospital. This put him in conflict with Dr. Novino and Dr. Kiem, as neither of them were receptive to the changes. After completing his residency, Chandler was promoted to attending physician and seemed destined for a long career at St. Eligius. However, late in the final season, Chandler stunned everyone by resigning his position and announcing he was leaving the field of medicine altogether, having realized that a life in medicine had been more his father's dream than his own. He moved to Mississippi with Roxanne Turner to begin a new life.

===== Dr. Virindakumar Jutswahtla "VJ" Kochar =====
Portrayed by Kavi Raz (main cast, 1982–1984; recurring, 1984–1988)

Kochar was an anesthesiologist from India. He had the misfortune of frequently working with Dr. Craig, who missed no opportunity to assault Kochar with bigoted, condescending remarks in the OR. (Kochar was perhaps Craig's second favorite target, after Ehrlich.) However, despite Craig's behavior, Kochar saved Craig's feet from frostbite when the two men were stranded during a blizzard, treating him for hypothermia and ensuring that he made it safely to St. Eligius. This was also the only episode to confirm what Kochar's first and middle name were. Kochar was seen less frequently in the later seasons and then quietly disappeared.

===== Dr. Jacqueline Wade =====
Portrayed by Sagan Lewis (1982–1988)

A sweet-natured young surgical resident from Lewiston, Maine with a sweet tooth and a tendency to crack a joke like close friend Wayne Fiscus. Wade was married very young (18 or 19) and her husband Robert (who was never seen on-camera) helped put her through medical school. However, the long hours of residency eventually took their toll on the marriage and Robert left her for another woman at the beginning of season 5. She and Seth Griffin shared a tentative romance: after spending the night together, though, she decided that she wasn't ready for a new relationship, although they remained friends through the remainder of the series. Professionally, Wade was extremely competent and was promoted to Chief Resident after Phillip Chandler decided to give up medicine. When the Craigs briefly separated, she accompanied her mentor Dr. Craig to a banquet. Although regularly featured throughout the entire run of the series, appearing from the first episode, Sagan Lewis was only promoted to the opening credits in the sixth and final season.

===== Luther Hawkins =====
Portrayed by Eric Laneuville (1982–1983 recurring; 1983–1988 main cast)

Luther began the show as a hospital orderly, then became a certified paramedic and ended the show as a student physician assistant. His mother worked in the hospital when she was pregnant with him and when he was a child. He formed a bond with Helen Rosenthal one day while he was waiting for his mother. His father died in the mid 1970s while participating in a Boston busing desegregation demonstration. As an adult, Luther had no immediate family and had pet birds at his apartment. He formed bonds with many of the long-term patients. In the later seasons, Luther grew unhappy with his position as an orderly and with life in general. He began to lash out more at people. He trained to become a paramedic but ultimately was dissatisfied with that position. With the help of Dr. Auschlander, he was able to get specialized training on the fast track to becoming a physician assistant while taking courses at Northeastern University. In the final season, he was married to Penny Franks (Stacey Dash) with Dr. Auschlander as a witness.

===== Nurse Lucy Papandreo-Ehrlich =====
Portrayed by Jennifer Savidge (recurring 1982–1986; series regular 1986–1988)

Originally a minor character who appeared briefly in the operating room during the series' first episode, the sarcastic, street-smart Lucy was initially a nurse on a ward and was promoted to head nurse when Rosenthal moved to the ER during season 3. However, when Rosenthal decided she wanted to return to the ward, she and Lucy battled bitterly over the head nurse position and their differences of opinion over running of the ward (the two women had previously been on good terms). She sued Rosenthal after Rosenthal slapped her during a heated argument (the suit was later dropped). Papandreo's battle with Rosenthal continued until the final episode of the series. Though Lucy traded sarcastic barbs with Ehrlich whenever the chance presented itself, the two began dating and were eventually married during season 6. During later years of the series, Papandreo became much like Dr. Craig in her harsh and judgmental attitude towards others with whom she disagreed.

===== Dr. Steven Kiley =====
Portrayed by Frank Dent (1982–1988)

Steven Kiley was a young doctor who often worked with Dr. Craig in the OR. Mainly a background character, his screen time mostly consisted of his being scolded by Craig during surgery, besting the luckless Ehrlich during rounds, or appearing at the lunch table with the other residents.

===== Dr. Oliver London =====
Oliver London was a cardiac surgeon, and a colleague (and adversary) of Mark Craig. London was an oft-mentioned, but virtually unseen doctor, known to viewers mostly through Craig's frequent insulting comments ("I wouldn't trust Oliver London to wind my watch, never mind perform heart surgery" or "he puts Sweeney Todd to shame" and "he would operate for the common cold"). It is unknown to viewers whether Craig's low opinion of him was due to professional jealousy or London genuinely being incompetent ... although when other doctors mentioned London, they did not deem him incompetent. London's face was never clearly seen in two brief appearances: as an assisting surgeon to Ehrlich in the Season 1 episode "Baron Von Munchausen" (then played by Walter Brooke) and being shoved into a locker by a clothes thief in the Season 4 episode "Remembrance of Things Past", though he was heard arguing with Craig in another Season 4 episode. A "young" Oliver was featured in "Time Heals" as a colleague of the young Craig and Westphall. In the final episode of the series, we learn that London was the pilot of the airplane that crash-landed into the hospital.

==== Left after Season 1 ====
===== Dr. Ben Samuels =====
Portrayed by David Birney (1982–1983)

Handsome and suave, though something of a heartbreaker, Samuels was a surgeon who seemed to spend as much time pursuing his female colleagues as treating patients. (In the pilot episode, he learned that he had contracted gonorrhea, and was forced to break the news to his many sex partners at St. Eligius.) He was, however, conscientious and caring about his patients (particularly 11-year-old Robby Durant (Jeremy Licht), who later died after a routine surgery). After Robby's death, Ben went to a bar, got drunk, and told a girl (a young Ally Sheedy) at a bar about his ex-wife Cynthia and his late son, Billy. After their divorce, Cynthia had bought a gun, and 9-year old Billy accidentally killed himself with it. Toward the end of season 1, his former lover (Dorothy Fielding) arrived at St. Eligius (after having spent time in the Peace Corps), and they renewed their relationship. Ultimately they drifted apart, as the factors that led them to break up the first time again become apparent. He later had a fling with Annie Cavanero. Samuels had disappeared, without explanation, when season 2 began.

===== Dr. Hugh Beale =====
Portrayed by G.W. Bailey (1982–1983)

Hugh Beale was a psychiatrist during season 1. He was well liked and highly regarded by his colleagues, even if his methods were sometimes unorthodox. He could not swim and begged Ben Samuels to teach him; this ended in disaster. One of his notable patients was Ralph (Richard Marcus), an intelligent middle aged man who thought he was a bird. Beale disappeared at the beginning of season 2 without explanation.

==== Left after Season 2 ====
===== Dr. Wendy Armstrong =====
Portrayed by Kim Miyori (1982–1984)

Born in Tallahassee, Florida, Wendy Armstrong was an overachiever, bright and pretty but uptight and intense. She was regarded as an especially good doctor, but sometimes had trouble connecting with patients and colleagues on a personal level. Staff frequently commented on her ability to eat anything she wanted and never gain weight, though it was later revealed that she suffered from bulimia. Depression and stress weakened Armstrong, as did an attempted rape by Peter White, and a serious misdiagnosis on her part (leading to a pregnant patient having a miscarriage). She committed suicide through a prescription drug overdose near the end of season 2; when she was brought into the ER, Fiscus, Shirley Daniels, and Jackie Wade attempted to save her life, but to no avail.

==== Left after Season 3 ====
===== Dr. Annie Cavanero =====
Portrayed by Cynthia Sikes (1982–1985)

A young attending physician, Cavanero often empathized with many of the residents, having completed her own residency not long before. Her feminist leanings seemed to frequently elicit crude, sexist remarks (particularly from Fiscus and Ehrlich), primarily to get a reaction from her. Her work and desire to maintain her independence seemed to prevent her from a long-term relationship, save a brief fling with a rather insensitive, abusive colleague, and a bit later an affair with Ben Samuels. She was suspected of having a lesbian affair with a visiting doctor, Dr. Christine Holtz (Caroline McWilliams), by many of the hospital staff. However, it was clear by the end of the episode arc that they were only friends. She abruptly disappeared from the series without explanation.

===== Dr. Cathy Martin =====
Portrayed by Barbara Whinnery (recurring 1982–1985; guest 1986)

Cathy Martin, a pathology resident regarded as eccentric, was known for having sexually pursued a number of male and female residents and other staff members at St. Eligius, most notably the virginal anesthesiologist Kochar (to whom she proposed sex on the night before he was to be married. He fainted and nothing happened) and Fiscus. Cathy also developed an infatuation with Dr. Craig shortly after Eve Leighton's heart transplant. However, Peter White, one of the few male residents she seemed to have no interest in, raped her during season 2. Following her rape, Cathy tried to refocus on her work, switching from pathology to psychiatry, but a second rape a few months later put her into a near catatonic state. She was admitted (putting her residency on hold), and when she eventually returned to her residency, she returned to psychiatry, wanting to help others as she had been helped. In one of her last appearances, she revealed to Fiscus that she was dating Kochar. The character disappeared toward the end of season 4; she later wandered into the ER during a brief cameo in the season four finale, though no attempt was made to explain what had become of her.

===== Dr. Peter White =====
Portrayed by Terence Knox (1982–1985)

Tall, dark, and handsome, White, a graduate of Brown University, was a very troubled individual and was regarded initially by colleagues, particularly Dr. Chandler, as an inept, substandard physician who made flagrant, even life-threatening, mistakes in his treatment of patients. His unstable personal life hindered his ability to perform as a resident. Impulsive and defiant, he alienated his wife Myra (Karen Landry), who made him leave their apartment. White, who sometimes relied on prescription pills for energy or relaxation, began a self-destructive cycle of drug and alcohol abuse and promiscuous sex with nurses at St. Eligius, as well as with prostitutes. During season 2, White was arrested for drunk driving, and placed on probation at the hospital. Dr. Westphall seriously considered dismissing him from the residency program, noting his overall lack of progress. Instead, he chose to work with White in an attempt improve his medical skills. Under Westphall's mentorship, White began to significantly improve. He eventually earned the respect of Westphall and the other residents, developing a reputation as a gifted diagnostician and radiologist. He was later caught up in an undercover operation at St. Eligius, which resulted his being censured by the state medical board and having his license to prescribe narcotics suspended for two years.

When a number of women reported rapes or attempted rapes at St. Eligius, including Cathy Martin and Wendy Armstrong, White turned out to be the culprit, and he was charged with the crimes. Though eventually acquitted, White was discharged from the residency program by an enraged Westphall, who was disgusted with White's crimes and felt personally betrayed by him. Through a lawsuit, Dr. Westphall was forced to eventually bring him back. Convinced that White was guilty of all the rapes, Westphall had relegated him to jobs where he had little contact with hospital staff and patients.

During White's second stint with the hospital, the rapes continued despite no evidence that he had committed any of them; these other attacks were later revealed to be the work of a copycat rapist. White's behavior became even more sociopathic. He tauntingly reminded Dr. Martin of the fact he got away with raping her, he gleefully disrupted Westphall's rounds with the other residents, and even physically threatened Westphall at one point when Westphall accused him of attempting to rape Dr. Cavanero.

He was generally shunned by everyone at the hospital except for Dr. Morrison. Morrison had been long-time friends with Peter and Myra White and believed that White was not capable of such horrible acts. White was shot and killed by Shirley Daniels (in the hospital's morgue) during season three. Before Daniels shot him, White, while denying the recent rapes, did admit to raping Dr. Martin the first time, stating she was his favourite victim.

Morrison organized a memorial for White where he eulogized him. Although some of his critics, namely Chandler, Dr. Fiscus, and Dr. Auschlander, attended the memorial, Westphall pointedly refused to go, telling Auschlander that this was the first time he lost a colleague but felt nothing whatsoever.

White did make two more appearances on the show, as a ghost in two dreamlike episodes (season three's "Sweet Dreams" and season five's "After Life").

===== Nurse Shirley Daniels =====
Portrayed by Ellen Bry (1982–1985)

Capable and confident, wholesome-looking Shirley Daniels had everyone's respect as an ER nurse. She was not put off by the sometimes sophomoric humor of some of the ER residents, particularly Fiscus, whom she dated for a few months. Though Shirley was angry when pathology resident Cathy Martin slept with Fiscus, she later came to Martin's aid after she was raped by Peter White, eventually shooting White and killing him early in season 3. Charged with White's murder, Shirley was released on bail and, while awaiting trial, returned to St. Eligius, first as an appendectomy patient and then briefly as a nurse after suing the hospital to reinstate her in her old position. Shirley worked only one shift after her reinstatement, however, firing a (fake) gun at Dr. Jack Morrison and wandering out of the ER afterwards and into the night. It was later revealed that Dr. Auschlander never gave her the go ahead to begin working at the hospital again. Shirley was convicted of White's murder, but returned to St. Eligius in a 1986 episode as a prisoner of the state, brought in for treatment unavailable at Framingham State Prison. During this episode, Shirley was again accused of murder when her hospital roommate mysteriously died. That incident, combined with a botched "welcome back" party thrown by the staff (she was given a picture/sampler that reads "We Hate You"), led Shirley to realize that St. Eligius would never fully welcome her back, and she bitterly exited the series chained to a wheelchair for the trip back to prison.

=== Introduced in Season 2 ===
==== Dr. Robert Caldwell ====
Portrayed by Mark Harmon (1983–1986)

Handsome plastic surgeon Robert "Bobby" Caldwell arrived at St. Eligius at the beginning of season 2, and it was later revealed that he had been having an ongoing affair with hospital administrator Joan Halloran. Towards the end of that season, Bobby ended the relationship because he felt it was largely based on superficial factors and he wanted a more intimate relationship. However, he ultimately became much more superficial and promiscuous (going against typical character development), and ended up having a series of flings and one-night stands (one of whom was an unstable woman who slashed his face with a razor blade, leaving him with a large scar). Shortly after this, Bobby was diagnosed with HIV (the first instance of an ongoing character contracting the virus on US network television, and one of the earliest depictions of a heterosexual character contracting the virus). When his HIV status became known to others, Bobby was told he could no longer be involved in patient care at the hospital, though he initially refused to leave. Devastated at his diagnosis and the effect it had on his career, he almost committed suicide, but was interrupted by a neighbor's child knocking at his door requesting his help. He then decided to go on with his life, but he left St. Eligius, and Boston, towards the end of season 4, to work part-time in an AIDS hospice on the West Coast. Bobby's former St. Eligius colleagues and friends were informed of his death during a season 6 episode; several of them held a memorial for him in St. Eligius's chapel.

==== Dr. Michael Ridley ====
Portrayed by Paul Sand (1983–1984)

Adolescent psychiatrist. He examined Tommy Westphall and gave some advice to Donald about dealing with Tommy's condition. He also helped Dr. Cathy Martin cope after her first rape at the hands of Peter White.

==== Dr. Samuel Weiss ====
Portrayed by Philip Sterling (1983–1988)

Psychiatrist who treated numerous patients and staff, including Victor Ehrlich's girlfriend Roberta (season 2), the Craigs (season 5) and Helen Rosenthal (season 6).

==== Dr. Elliot Axelrod ====
Portrayed by Stephen Furst (1983–1988)

Axlerod first visited St. Eligius during an elective while finishing medical school, and later joined as a resident. Overweight and awkward, he had a difficult time initially, but eventually proved himself as capable and competent. Though the more senior residents found him to be annoying, he was eventually accepted, particularly bonding with Fiscus. Axlerod was one of the few at St. Eligius who were able to connect with ill-tempered patient Mrs. Hufnagel, to the point where she named him in her will. He briefly dated Helen Rosenthal's oldest daughter Marcie, though a series of events prevented their relationship from progressing. Axelrod suffered a heart attack and died after surgery towards the end of season 6. Axelrod's lack of respect was apparent when his colleagues could not even clear their schedules to plan a memorial service for him. Fiscus was the only resident who was shaken by Elliot's death. When the morgue attendant put a sandwich next to Elliot's corpse, the normally jovial Fiscus chastised him for his lack of sensitivity.

==== Orderly Warren Coolidge ====
Portrayed by Byron Stewart (1984–1988)

Warren Coolidge is an orderly and a colleague of Luther Hawkins. He is well liked and regarded as competent at his job. He was a former basketball player who was forced to quit due to an injury. His large size was sometimes used to comic effect when paired with Luther (who is shorter and smaller-framed). He was found to be a very skilled at construction when the Craigs hired him and Luther to renovate the Craigs' kitchen. In one of his most memorable scenes, the normally easy-going Coolidge, upset that Dr. Gideon was not being fair to the orderlies, picked up and smashed Gideon's model replica of the hospital.

Coolidge was originally a supporting character on The White Shadow.

=== Introduced in Season 4 ===
==== Dr. Roxanne Turner ====
Portrayed by Alfre Woodard (1985–1987)

Roxanne Turner was an OB-GYN who joined St. Eligius at the beginning of season 4 (presumably to take over for Annie Cavanero, who had abruptly disappeared at the end of the previous season). One of her first cases was Ken and Terri Valeri (George Deloy and Deborah May), an infertile couple trying to conceive. Roxanne spent a great deal of time helping them. She also delivered the Craigs' only grandchild, Barbara. She began dating Chandler, whom she continued to be involved with for most of the remainder of the series. Roxanne and Chandler's relationship was challenged when she returned to her hometown in rural Mississippi to serve as their physician, after receiving word that her childhood doctor had died. She returned to St. Eligius at the beginning of season 5, and they resumed their relationship. She again returned to Mississippi toward the latter part of the final season, realizing she preferred practicing medicine in a small town. Chandler accompanied her there.

In 1998, Woodard reprised the role for a sixth-season episode of Homicide: Life on the Street entitled "Mercy." This episode revealed that Dr. Turner had moved to Baltimore and was now working at a hospice. She was suspected of euthanizing several of her terminally ill patients, but no criminal charges were ever filed against her.

=== Introduced in Season 5 ===
==== Dr. David Domedion ====
Portrayed by Dean Jagger (1985), Jackie Cooper (1986)

David Domedion was a long-time director of surgery at St. Eligius. He was the highly respected mentor of Dr. Craig and was first referred to by Craig as being deceased. However, in the third season, Craig realized that Domedian was still alive and went to visit him. When Craig arrived at his house, it was apparent that Domedion was in very poor health and suffering from advanced dementia. He failed to recognize Craig at first but, during a brief moment, he acknowledged his former student. He appeared again in the fourth season via flashback to 1955. During the flashback, it's revealed that the Domedion-Craig relationship mirrors the Craig-Ehrlich relationship. Just like Ehrlich, a young Craig was a brownnoser who longed for attention and, just like the older Craig, Domedion was a no-nonsense perfectionist who insisted on tough love to his staff and hurled some of the same insults to Craig as Craig did to Ehrlich. Dr. Craig bragged to Westphall that Domedion gave him a valuable surgical instrument. However, when Domedion asked Craig where the instrument was, Craig feigned innocence. When Craig returned to St. Eligius in 1965, he was told that his departure had devastated Domedion.

==== Dr. Seth Griffin ====
Portrayed by Bruce Greenwood (1986–1988)

Handsome, cocky resident Seth Griffin arrived at St. Eligius during season 5, and quickly alienated veteran nurse Helen Rosenthal, attempting to blame her for a patient's death for which he was actually responsible. He also attempted to play Carol Novino and another female first-year resident, Susan Birch, against one another. Conflicts with other attendings, nurses and residents followed, leading to his reputation as being "difficult." Griffin did not help his own case when he began dating Westphall's headstrong daughter, Lizzie. Lizzie became pregnant and aborted the child with very little support from Griffin. After this episode, Westphall tried to not let his personal feelings toward Griffin boil over into their professional relationship. He once remarked to Griffin, "I just cannot understand how such a good doctor could be such a lousy human being". However, Griffin later proved himself as a doctor, and matured a bit as time passed. In season six he accidentally pricked himself with a needle while drawing blood from AIDS patient Brett Johnston. Frightened of the possibility that he may have contracted the disease himself, he became a born-again Christian. In the final episode, he initially tested positive for HIV but it was later revealed to be false positive.

==== Dr. Susan Birch ====
Portrayed by Jamie Rose (1986)

Susan Birch was a first-year resident who joined St. Eligius for her residency at the beginning of season 5. Having the misfortune of being paired with reckless, narcissistic Seth Griffin, Susan was first caught in the crossfire when Seth took it upon himself to let a terminal, elderly patient die (and then subsequently tried to blame Rosenthal for the death). He went on to play Birch against fellow first-year Carol Novino, creating animosity and drama between the two women, ultimately resulting in Novino being reprimanded and Birch being suspended from the residency program over the death of a patient.

==== Dr. Paulette Kiem ====
Portrayed by France Nuyen (1986–1988)

Paulette Kiem was a Vietnamese surgeon from Baltimore who arrived at St. Eligius during season 5, hired by the hospital to take over for Mark Craig when a hand injury prevented Craig from performing surgery. Paulette was very well thought of as a surgeon and was regarded as kind and gracious, even despite Craig's often boorish (and frequently racist) behavior toward her. When Craig recovered from his injury and returned to his old position, Dr. Kiem stayed on as Director of Education. Kiem had a long-distance marriage. Her husband (John Astin) lived in Maryland and they saw each other on weekends.

==== Dr. Carol Novino ====
Portrayed by Cindy Pickett (1986–1988)

Carol Novino, a former nurse, left St. Eligius to attend medical school. She returned as a resident, and eventually began dating Westphall (his first serious relationship since his wife's death a decade earlier). Their relationship further alienated Novino from her fellow residents, who were nearly a decade her junior. Novino also offended Rosenthal, Papendreo and other members of the nursing staff, when she said she told them she decided to go to medical school because she didn't want to settle for being "just a nurse." She eventually became more confident and comfortable in her new role, and was accepted by most of her colleagues.

=== Introduced in Season 6 ===
==== Dr. John Gideon ====
Portrayed by Ronny Cox (1987–1988)

Dr. Gideon was the pragmatic, authoritarian administrator who was assigned to St. Eligius after the hospital was taken over by Ecumena (later renamed Weigert), a health maintenance organization, during St. Elsewhere's final season. An oncologist, Gideon demonstrated his medical skill when he did a follow-up exam on one of Dr. Westphall's patients (Judge Farnham), irritating Dr. Westphall. Gideon, however, quickly determined that Farnham had been misdiagnosed by Dr. Westphall, and in fact had stage four pancreatic cancer (much to Westphall's embarrassment).

Gideon proved equally adept at hospital politics. When Westphall became too demanding in his efforts to establish an AIDS clinic at St. Eligius (which sharply conflicted with the business-minded approach of both Gideon and Weigert), Gideon orchestrated a showdown between Westphall and his superiors at Weigert, which resulted in Westphall being fired. Gideon did offer to go to bat for Westphall and get him reinstated ... if he agreed to abandon his efforts regarding the AIDS clinic. Frustrated by the way both Gideon and Weigert were trying to manipulate him, Westphall angrily rejected Gideon's offer by mooning him.

Though Gideon was well-meaning and sincere in his desire to improve St. Eligius, his approach to medicine contrasted sharply with the community minded, Catholic social justice traditions of the hospital. This, and his tendency to come off as abrasive on occasion, led to conflicts with some members of the hospital's staff.

Gideon hired Ellen Craig as the hospital nutritionist. Recently separated from Dr. Craig, Ellen began a torrid romance with Gideon, much to the chagrin of Dr. Craig and his colleagues. Though Gideon wanted to pursue his romance with Ellen, she still had conflicted feelings for Mark, and ultimately reconciled with him.

His relationship with Dr. Auschlander was complicated. Though the two did develop a mutual respect for each other's professional abilities, and were able to work well together at times, they frequently clashed over the direction and policies Gideon advocated for the hospital.

After a year at St. Eligius, Gideon, despite his best efforts, reluctantly concluded that St. Eligius and Weigert were not compatible. Gideon and Auschlander worked together one last time to resolve the situation. Gideon convinced Weigert to return control of St. Eligius to the Catholic Church, while Auschlander brokered a deal with the archdiocese by which it would purchase St. Eligius, with Dr. Westphall as administrator. Westphall sincerely apologized to Gideon for mooning him the previous year, and even publicly praised him for his efforts to help St. Eligius during the past year. Both men were united in their grief over Dr. Auschlander's sudden death from a stroke.

Gideon subsequently relocated to San Jose, California to serve as an administrator for a Weigert-owned medical facility.

== Other characters ==
=== Introduced in Season 1 ===
==== Mrs. Ellen Craig (nee Harper) ====
Portrayed by Bonnie Bartlett (Recurring character, 1982–85; series regular, 1985–88)

Ellen Craig was Dr. Mark Craig's long-suffering wife. (She was played by Bonnie Bartlett, off-screen wife to William Daniels, who portrayed Mark Craig.) Though only a minor character initially, she proved popular with viewers and she became a series regular at the beginning of season 4 and was featured on the opening credits beginning at season 5. She eventually tired of Mark's obsessive perfectionism and overbearing personality, and became further alienated from him after the death of their son Steven. Ellen left him during season 5 and had an affair with John Gideon, though she and Mark reconciled toward the end of the final season. In the final episode, Ellen was offered a position as Director of Food Services at a major hospital in Cleveland. Mark, who'd finally come to appreciate the many sacrifices that Ellen had made for him through the years, agreed to relocate to Cleveland with her so that she could take the position.

==== Myra White ====
Portrayed by Karen Landry (1982–1985)

Myra was Peter White's wife. Though she loved Peter, she could not bear his self-destructive path, and left him toward the later part of season 1. Though she eventually agreed to a reconciliation, she was devastated to learn that Peter was in fact the "ski mask" rapist. She moved out with their two children around that time. She returned to St. Eligius to have her baby (after Peter's death). The hospital staff gave her a baby shower shortly after the birth. The shower was halted after she opened up a gift which turned out to be a ski mask from an anonymous person (later revealed to be Shirley Daniels). She was not seen or mentioned after that.

==== Elizabeth "Lizzie" Westphall ====
Portrayed by Dana Short (1982–1988); Melanie Gaffin portrayed nine-year old Lizzie in the "Time Heals" episode

Lizzie Westphall was Donald's teenage daughter. Having had to help take care of her autistic brother Tommy after their mother's death, she was unusually mature and responsible for her age, and generally good-natured; she did have a defiant side, which became especially apparent through her argumentative tone with a number of the Westphalls' housekeepers (who she felt were not caring for Tommy appropriately). Lizzie went away to college, eventually bringing a boyfriend home with her for a weekend and expecting him to sleep with her in her bedroom, something Dr. Westphall objected to (with Lizzie responding that she was not a baby anymore). Toward the end of the series, Lizzie began dating Seth Griffin, a much older resident at St. Eligius, much to her father's displeasure. Lizzie become pregnant by Seth and underwent an abortion.

=== Introduced in Season 2 ===
==== Katherine Auschlander ====
Portrayed by Jane Wyatt (1983–1988); Devon Ericson as young Katherine in "Time Heals" episode, 1985

Wife of Dr. Auschlander, they were married since the 1940s. A longtime volunteer at St. Eligius, Katherine led the Women's Auxiliary, which coordinated the annual "Doctor of the Year" event. Katherine remained supportive when it was revealed that, prior to their marriage, Daniel had had a son with a former girlfriend (who gave him up for adoption, and never informed Daniel of his existence).

==== Joan Halloran ====
Portrayed by Nancy Stafford (1983–1984, 1985, 1986)

An administrator brought in by the City of Boston to evaluate and improve efficiency at the hospital. She frequently clashed with Westphall, Auschlander and Craig, particularly when she tried to prevent Craig from performing a heart transplant during season 2. She was romantically involved with Bobby Caldwell for a time, though he ended the affair towards the end of season 2. Soon afterwards, she was removed from her position by the City. Initially considered an adversary of the hospital administration, she eventually gained their respect. So much so, that when Dr. Auschlander was looking for assistant in season 3, he ultimately gave up the interview process and hired Joan. She appeared once more during season 4 in 1986, blissfully engaged to a man with a family. Bobby Caldwell called in to see her with the bad news that he'd recently tested HIV positive and, as one of his former partners, recommended that she get herself tested for the virus. Though horrified at the prospect, she was relieved to find out she was not infected.

==== Ira Rosenthal ====
Portrayed by Alan Oppenheimer (1983–1984)

Helen Rosenthal's fourth husband, and father of her youngest son Jeffrey. He loved her and was extremely supportive after her mastectomy, but angrily left Helen after finding out about her affair with Richard. He was sometimes mentioned in later seasons, sometimes depicted as an absentee father (in one episode, neglecting to pick Jeffrey up for a planned custodial visit).

==== Tommy Westphall ====
Portrayed by Chad Allen (1983–1988)

Tommy Westphall was the autistic son of Dr. Donald Westphall and his deceased wife. The demands of caring for Tommy, combined with the frustrations of a changing St. Eligius, led Donald to leave the hospital in season 6, after which he relocated with Tommy to a quiet life in New Hampshire (as depicted in season 6's "Their Town"). Tommy's autism took on added significance during St. Elsewhere's final moments.

=== Introduced in Season 3 ===
==== Mrs. Hufnagel ====
Portrayed by Florence Halop (1984–1985)

Mrs. Hufnagel was a surly and miserable old lady who was repeatedly admitted for a series of ailments over the course of Season 3. She insulted nearly everyone who tried to help her, and was disliked by nearly the entire St. Eligius staff. She died presumably after being crushed when her hospital bed closed on her, though it was later revealed that her death was due to an error on Dr. Craig's part during a surgery.

==== Judge Farnham ====
Portrayed by Jack Dodson (1984–1988)

Somewhat crusty Boston judge who also sat on St. Eligius' board. A good friend of Auschlander, he developed pancreatic cancer during season 6, and was accidentally killed when Rosenthal neglected to place a regulator on his morphine drip.

=== Introduced in Season 4 ===
==== John Doe No. 6 ====
Portrayed by Oliver Clark (1985–1986)

John Doe was an amnesia patient who'd been admitted to St. Eligius' psych unit, where he spent a great deal of time trying to recall his former life and identity. During his run on St. Elsewhere, Doe masqueraded as a reviewer with a re-credentialing committee visiting St. Eligius, passed himself off as other random people (including, in one episode, John McEnroe), and believed he was The Mary Tyler Moore Show's Mary Richards and took up Mary's bubbly persona ("I can turn the world on with a smile!"); it was during this last incident that Doe encountered visiting doctor Gloria Neal and greeted her as "Sue Ann," with Dr. Neal informing him that he must have her confused with someone else. (Dr. Neal was played by Betty White, who played Sue Ann Nivens on Moore.) In the same episode, "Close Encounters", the series is revealed to exist in the same universe as The Bob Newhart Show, suggesting that John Doe may be Oliver Clark's character, Ed Herd; fellow in-patient Elliot Carlin (Jack Riley) verbally abuses him in the same manner as when Carlin and Herd were patients of Dr. Robert Hartley (or "some quack in Chicago," as he is referred to in the episode). Toward the middle of season 4, Doe departed St. Eligius after being "claimed" by an aristocratic southern couple as their relative, with Dr. Auschlander later learning that a psychiatric hospital in Louisiana reported that two inpatients had escaped and were thought to be heading for Boston to look up an old friend. During Season 5, Auschlander assigned Doe to assist Dr. Craig after Craig demanded that Auschlander find him a secretary to type his memoirs. Despite Craig's initial dismay, Doe proved himself to be a fantastic typist (over 100 words-a-minute), and actually pushed Craig to quit his memoirs and write a novel instead (part of which he found on scrap paper). However, Doe began to copy Craig's persona, even wrapping his hand in bandages, wearing surgical scrubs and drawing a mustache with permanent marker (to match Craig's mustache). Doe later disappeared from St. Eligius along with Dr. Craig's novel and got it published under a pseudonym. Dr. Craig eventually confronted him and, after punching him in the face, he brokered a deal with Doe allowing him to remain being the "front" for the book.

==== Richard Clarendon ====
Portrayed by Herb Edelman (1984–1988)

Richard was a union mediator called in to help with the nurses' strike during season 3. After the strike was settled, he began an affair with Helen Rosenthal, which ultimately led to the end of Helen's fourth marriage. However, Richard later moved in with Helen and her children. He asked her to marry him when it appeared that Helen was pregnant; when it turned out Helen was not pregnant, but entering menopause, they decided not to marry, and instead continued to live together.

==== Clancy Williams ====
Portrayed by Helen Hunt (1984–1986)

Clancy was an anthropology student and anti-nuclear activist who began dating "Boomer" Morrison toward the end of season 2, after the death of his wife. When Clancy became pregnant, she decided to terminate the pregnancy, despite Morrison's objections. She briefly moved in with Boomer after her apartment was burglarized, but quickly moved out again due to her need for independence. They continued to date, though Clancy eventually found herself to be little more than a babysitter for the busy Morrison's son and broke up with him. Despite this, they remained friends. She briefly dated Wayne Fiscus (in the episode "Family Affair").

==== Ken and Terri Valere ====
Portrayed respectively by George Deloy and Deborah May (1985–1986)

Ken Valere was an upwardly mobile stockbroker who, along with his wife Terri, sought advice from Roxanne Turner in season 4 as to why they were having trouble conceiving a child. After many dramatically failed attempts they eventually gave up. However, the stars finally aligned when Dr. Turner found them a baby to adopt.

=== Introduced in Season 5 ===
==== Joanne McFadden ====
Portrayed by Patricia Wettig (1986–1988)

Joanne was a friend of Jack and Nina Morrison from Seattle, from before they'd relocated to Boston for Jack's residency. After Nina's death, Jack reconnected with Joanne during a visit to Seattle, and on a whim, she followed him back to Boston and they impulsively decided to elope. Jack had to then adjust to making a life with Joanne and her two children. However, after a few months, Joanne's ex-husband sued for custody of their children to bring them back with him to Seattle (after a violent encounter with Nick Moates). Unable to cope with the loss of her children, Joanne also returned to Seattle, leaving Jack behind. When Jack completed his residency, he relocated to Seattle to reconcile with Joanne.
