= Ian Masters (journalist) =

Australian-American journalist

- Born: Australia
- Occupations: Journalist, radio show host
- Spouse: Christina Pickles (m. 2005)

Ian Masters is an Australian-born, BBC-trained American broadcast journalist, commentator, author, screenwriter and documentary filmmaker.

Masters hosted the KPFK, Pacifica Radio program Background Briefing which deals with American politics, foreign policy as well as domestic American security issues. Masters has hosted a once weekly episode of Background Briefing since 1980; in 2009, the program was expanded to five days per week. It is broadcast on more than forty radio stations across the US, and is also available as a podcast.

Masters resigned from his position hosting "Background Briefing" at KPFK and now produces the show at his home in Santa Monica as an online podcast. His shows are no longer aired on FM radio station KPFK. Instead, they now air on KPFA in Berkeley, California, US.

Ian Masters returned his podcast to KPFK after the station instituted reforms under interim station manager Maggie LaPique at the beginning of 2025.

== Personal life ==
Masters is married to British-American actress Christina Pickles.
