= List of St. Elsewhere episodes =

The following is a list of episodes for the American medical drama television series St. Elsewhere. The series ran on NBC from October 26, 1982, to May 25, 1988, with a total of 137 episodes produced, spanning 6 seasons.

== Series overview ==
Season	Episodes	Originally released	
Season	Episodes	First released	Last released
1	22	October 26, 1982	May 3, 1983
2	22	October 26, 1983	May 16, 1984
3	24	September 19, 1984	March 27, 1985
4	24	September 18, 1985	May 7, 1986
5	23	September 24, 1986	May 27, 1987
6	22	September 16, 1987	May 25, 1988

== Episodes ==
=== Season 1 (1982–83) ===
No. overall	No. in season	Title	Directed by	Written by	Original release date	Prod. code
1	1	"Pilot"	Thomas Carter	Joshua Brand & John Falsey	October 26, 1982	2313
While the doctors of St. Eligius search for a missing mental patient, paramedics bring in the victims of a terrorist bombing. Debut episode: Seen in the opening credits (in the following order) were Ed Flanders as Dr. Donald Westphall, David Birney as Dr. Ben Samuels, G.W. Bailey as Dr. Hugh Beale, Ed Begley Jr. as Dr. Victor Ehrlich, Terence Knox as Dr. Peter White, Howie Mandel as Dr. Wayne Fiscus, David Morse as Dr. Jack Morrison, Christina Pickles as Nurse Helen Rosenthal, Kavi Raz as Dr. V.J. Kochar, Cynthia Sikes as Dr. Annie Cavanero, Denzel Washington as Dr. Philip Chandler, and William Daniels as Dr. Mark Craig. The following actors were seen in the debut episode, but would not be promoted to the opening credits until later seasons: Norman Lloyd as Dr. Daniel Auschlander, Barbara Whinnery as Dr. Cathy Martin, Kim Miyori as Dr. Wendy Armstrong, Ellen Bry as Nurse Shirley Daniels, Eric Laneuville as Luther Hawkins, Sagan Lewis as Dr. Jacqueline Wade, and Jennifer Savidge as Nurse Lucy Papandrao.
2	2	"Bypass"	Thomas Carter	Joshua Brand & John Falsey	November 9, 1982	2301
As Morrison reluctantly treats the bomber (Tim Robbins), Ehrlich has his first OR session with Craig and Beale takes a swimming lesson from Samuels.
3	3	"Down's Syndrome"	Mark Tinker	Story by : Joshua Brand & John Falsey and Tom Fontana; Teleplay by : Tom Fontana	November 16, 1982	2304
A couple (Tony Bill, Maureen Anderman) learn their unborn child has Down's syndrome, while Westphall plays host to hospital board members.
4	4	"Cora and Arnie"	Mark Tinker	Story by : Joshua Brand & John Falsey and Neil Cuthbert; Teleplay by : Neil Cuthbert	November 23, 1982	2305
Morrison informs a bag lady (Doris Roberts) with sore feet that she has a life-threatening condition and a parolee in pain (Lionel Smith) learns that he's been shot.
5	5	"Samuels and the Kid"	Thomas Carter	Story by : Joshua Brand & John Falsey and John Masius; Teleplay by : John Masius	November 30, 1982	2303
As Chandler accuses a nurse (Vivian Bonnell) of incompetence and Cavanero instructs a teenager (Henry Celis) on delivering a baby over the phone, Samuels befriends an 11-year-old boy (Jeremy Licht) with a football injury. Debut episode: Bonnie Bartlett as Ellen Craig.
6	6	"Legionnaires: Part 1"	Thomas Carter	Story by : Joshua Brand & John Falsey and Joel Surnow; Teleplay by : Joel Surnow	December 7, 1982	2306
Westphall considers closing a ward after patients die of Legionnaires' disease, while a nurse (Rita Taggart) expresses contempt for Cavanero.
7	7	"Legionnaires: Part 2"	Mark Tinker	Story by : Joshua Brand & John Falsey and Charles Rosin; Teleplay by : Charles Rosin	December 14, 1982	2309
As Fiscus is mugged in the ER and Beale discovers his patient (Laraine Newman) got pregnant during her stay, Westphall's decision to close the ward puts his job on the line.
8	8	"Tweety and Ralph"	Mark Tinker	Story by : Joshua Brand & John Falsey and Elizabeth Diggs; Teleplay by : Elizabeth Diggs	December 21, 1982	2307
While a patient (Molly Cheek) celebrates her upcoming hysterectomy, Ralph (Richard Marcus) makes a nest in the storeroom.
9	9	"Rain"	Victor Hsu	Story by : Joshua Brand & John Falsey and Tom Fontana; Teleplay by : Tom Fontana	January 4, 1983	2308
As Morrison takes a house call he later regrets, Fiscus pulls his gun on a patient (Ray Liotta) and White's daughter (Candace Cameron) swallows mothballs.
10	10	"Hearts"	Mark Tinker	Story by : Joshua Brand & John Falsey and John Masius; Teleplay by : John Masius	January 11, 1983	2310
While Ralph poses as a staffer and a woman (Conchata Ferrell) learns she has labor pains, Ehrlich experiences another moment of truth assisting Craig.
11	11	"Graveyard"	Victor Lobl	Story by : Joshua Brand & John Falsey; Teleplay by : Joshua Brand & John Falsey and John Masius and Tom Fontana	January 18, 1983	2302
Samuels tries to save a critically wounded patient (Tom Hulce), while a Chinese couple perform a ritual on their dying son (Rummel Mor) and Ralph (Richard Marcus) decides to leave St. Eligius, by flying away.
12	12	"Release"	Victor Lobl	Story by : Joshua Brand & John Falsey; Teleplay by : Tom Fontana and David Assael	February 1, 1983	2311
As Craig's college roommate (Andy Romano) checks in for a sex change operation, White tries to get his first autopsy consent form and Chandler helps a shooting victim (Tom Hulce) regain his memory.
13	13	"Family History"	Kevin Hooks	Story by : Joshua Brand & John Falsey; Teleplay by : Andrew Laskos	February 8, 1983	2312
White hopes to reconcile with his wife (Karen Landry), while the amnesiac shooting victim (Tom Hulce) meets his parents (Alan Feinstein, Claire Malis) and Armstrong attempts to correct an embarrassing oversight.
14	14	"Remission"	Mark Tinker	Story by : Joshua Brand & John Falsey; Teleplay by : Leigh Curran	February 22, 1983	2314
As Auschlander considers chemotherapy, a victim of a racially-motivated assault (David Elliott) is brought in, a female flasher (Janis Paige) roams the halls and Fiscus - recently evicted from his apartment - convinces Ehrlich to take him in.
15	15	"Monday, Tuesday, Sven's Day"	Bruce Paltrow	Story by : Joshua Brand & John Falsey; Teleplay by : John Masius and Tom Fontana	March 1, 1983	2315
While Ehrlich gets mismatched for a party at Craig's house, Morrison learns that the assault victim (David Elliott) was not beaten up due to racial issues and tricks are played on Luther for his birthday.
16	16	"The Count"	Kevin Hooks	Joshua Brand & John Falsey	March 8, 1983	2316
Cavanero and Samuels help a porn star (Michael Halsey) hide from a summons server (William Schilling), while Armstrong suspects a surgeon (Peter Michael Goetz) of needlessly inserting pacemakers in patients.
17	17	"Brothers"	Mark Tinker	Story by : Joshua Brand & John Falsey; Teleplay by : Mark Tinker & John Tinker	March 15, 1983	2317
As Ehrlich asks Nurse Daniels for a second chance, and Rosenthal faces a mastectomy, a man (Pat Hingle) asks the doctors to end his terminally ill brother's suffering.
18	18	"Dog Day Hospital"	Victor Lobl	Story by : Joshua Brand & John Falsey; Teleplay by : John Ford Noonan	March 22, 1983	2318
A pregnant woman (Judith Light) with a gun interrupts Ehrlich's first solo operation when she demands to see the doctor who gave her husband (Tom Atkins) a vasectomy, while Fiscus's feisty "aunt" (Elizabeth Kerr) tours the hospital.
19	19	"Working"	Bruce Paltrow	Story by : Joshua Brand & John Falsey; Teleplay by : Dennis Cooper	April 5, 1983	2320
The family of a patient (Alan Haufrect) who died in an elevator sues Chandler, and an attractive surgeon (Rita Zohar) reveals a different side of Craig.
20	20	"Craig in Love"	Victor Lobl	Story by : Joshua Brand & John Falsey; Teleplay by : Steve Lawson	April 12, 1983	2321
Craig continues to enjoy the warmth of Dr. Anya (Rita Zohar) while his wife is away and Chandler grows increasingly sensitive due to the malpractice charge. Final episode: David Birney as Dr. Ben Samuels. (Though credited in the following two episodes, this is Samuels' final appearance.)
21	21	"Baron Von Munchausen"	Victor Hsu	Story by : Joshua Brand & John Falsey; Teleplay by : David Assael and Paul Schiffer	April 19, 1983	2319
As a crazy woman (Micole Mercurio) attacks Daniels, and Craig addresses a group of minority med students, Morrison and Ehrlich clash over whether to operate on a man (Louis Giambalvo) whose test results differ from his condition.
22	22	"Addiction"	Mark Tinker	John Masius and Tom Fontana	May 3, 1983	2322
White is suspected of stealing drugs, Auschlander gets into a fist fight, Craig's med-student son (Scott Paulin) has a different reaction to medicine, and Morrison's wife (Deborah White) goes into labor. Final episode: G.W. Bailey as Dr. Hugh Beale.

=== Season 2 (1983–84) ===
No. overall	No. in season	Title	Directed by	Written by	Original release date	Prod. code
23	1	"Ties That Bind"	Bruce Paltrow	John Masius and Tom Fontana	October 26, 1983	3301
City-budget advisor Joan Halloran clashes with Craig over funds for a heart transplant, while a man (Alan Arkin) refuses to leave his wife (Piper Laurie) after driving her to the ER. Debut episode: Nancy Stafford as Joan Halloran.
24	2	"Lust Et Veritas"	Mark Tinker	Story by : John Masius and Tom Fontana and Dennis Cooper; Teleplay by : Dennis Cooper	November 2, 1983	3302
Singleton (Alan Arkin) goes too far to rehabilitate his wife (Piper Laurie) and a plastic surgeon sees a good side to Halloran. Debut episode: Mark Harmon as Dr. Robert Caldwell, Stephen Furst as Dr. Elliot Axelrod. (Harmon was in the credits of the previous episode, but did not actually appear in the show until this episode.)
25	3	"Newheart"	Mark Tinker	John Masius and Tom Fontana and Garn Stephens & Emilie R. Small	November 9, 1983	3303
As Fran Singleton (Piper Laurie) refuses to see her husband (Alan Arkin), Halloran faces strong opposition to the proposed participation in a nuclear contingency plan.
26	4	"Qui Transtulit Sustinet"	Victor Lobl	Story by : John Masius and Tom Fontana; Teleplay by : John Tinker & Mark Tinker	November 16, 1983	3304
The heart-transplant team being led by Craig faces complications, while Luther asks Fiscus to join him in a silver-futures investment.
27	5	"A Wing and a Prayer"	Bruce Paltrow	Raymond DeLaurentis & Robert DeLaurentis	November 23, 1983	3305
The staff of St. Eligius plan their own Thanksgiving dinner, leading to Craig and Ehrlich having a competition for best turkey.
28	6	"Under Pressure"	David Anspaugh	Story by : John Masius and Tom Fontana; Teleplay by : Steve Bello	November 30, 1983	3307
Two Irish teenagers (Eric Stoltz, Thomas Dewier) cause trouble at the hospital, while Rosenthal gets arrested just before her breast surgery and a lounge singer (Austin Pendleton) sets up in an elevator.
29	7	"Entrapment"	Mark Tinker	Story by : Tom Fontana and John Masius and Steve Bello; Teleplay by : Steve Bello	December 7, 1983	3308
As Craig finds the answer to Eve's post-operative blues, a Protestant youth runs down a Catholic and White has a drug relapse.
30	8	"All About Eve"	David Anspaugh	John Masius and Tom Fontana	December 14, 1983	3309
Caldwell reveals his relationship with Halloran during his treatment, while Westphall tells his autistic son (Chad Allen) that their housekeeper (Penny Santon) is leaving.
31	9	"AIDS and Comfort"	Victor Lobl	Story by : John Masius and Tom Fontana and Steve Lawson; Teleplay by : Steve Lawson	December 21, 1983	3306
White reveals that he's treating a patient with AIDS (Michael Brandon) just as the hospital is having difficulty organizing a blood drive during a blizzard.
32	10	"A Pig Too Far"	Linda Day	John Tinker and James Kahn	January 11, 1984	3310
Halloran investigates transfer practices when an indigent is brought in from a private hospital, while Ehrlich experiences the neuroses that come with being in love.
33	11	"Blizzard"	Kevin Hooks	Steve Lawson and Jamie Horton	January 18, 1984	3311
During a blizzard, Craig has a hard time getting to the hospital, Martin has a date, a computer hacker (David Knell) makes trouble for Luther and the roof falls in on Cavanero.
34	12	"Hearing"	Charles Braverman	Story by : Steve Bello and Robert Daniels; Teleplay by : Steve Bello	February 1, 1984	3312
As Luther and Fiscus use chemical relief to treat Auschlander and a radiology supervisor (Raymond Singer) criticizes a deaf employee (Robert Daniels), the futures of Daniels and White at St. Eligius are decided at a hearing.
35	13	"In Sickness and in Health"	Mark Tinker	John Masius and Tom Fontana	February 8, 1984	3313
Halloran's father (William Windom) comes to the hospital, while Craig's mother-in-law (Lurene Tuttle) and Ehrlich's aunt (Louise Lasser) are among the guests at Roberta (Jean Bruce Scott) and Ehrlich's wedding.
36	14	"Drama Center"	David Anspaugh	Story by : John Masius and Tom Fontana; Teleplay by : John Tinker	February 15, 1984	3314
A rape happens outside the hospital, Westphall's son and White each struggle to deal with change and a TV crew follows Craig.
37	15	"Attack"	Kevin Hooks	Story by : John Masius and Tom Fontana; Teleplay by : Cynthia Darnell & Douglas Brooks West	February 22, 1984	3315
As a construction worker (Dan Hedaya) keeps quiet about his medical history to avoid losing work time and Auschlander enjoys the company of an old girlfriend (Geraldine Fitzgerald), the rapist finds a new victim inside the hospital.
38	16	"After Dark"	Eric Laneuville	Story by : John Masius and Tom Fontana and Steve Lawson; Teleplay by : Steve Lawson	February 29, 1984	3316
While Craig expects to win the "Doctor of the Year" award and Caldwell and Ehrlich make decisions about their romantic relationships, the rapist strikes again.
39	17	"Vanity"	Mark Tinker	Story by : John Masius and Tom Fontana; Teleplay by : John Tinker and Raymond DeLaurentis and Jorge Zamacona	March 7, 1984	3317
Craig wants to put a stop to the TV documentary, Rosenthal has reconstructive breast surgery and Mr. Entertainment (Austin Pendleton) finds his true calling.
40	18	"Equinox"	David Anspaugh	Story by : John Masius and Tom Fontana; Teleplay by : Channing Gibson & Charles H. Eglee	March 14, 1984	3318
As Cavanero faces the task of telling a student he has cancer, White is let go from his reduced assault charge and returns to the hospital - only to face a hostile staff, including Martin.
41	19	"The Women"	Bruce Paltrow	Story by : John Masius and Tom Fontana; Teleplay by : John Ford Noonan	March 28, 1984	3319
The staff of St. Eligius makes friends with an octogenarian (Eva Le Gallienne), an erratic mother (Brenda Vaccaro) and a nose-job recipient (Blythe Danner).
42	20	"Cramming"	Tim Matheson	Steve Lawson and Steve Bello	May 2, 1984	3320
As Armstrong makes a fatal misdiagnosis and White takes a polygraph test, Ehrlich attempts to send Aunt Charice (Louise Lasser) away as he crams for the National Boards.
43	21	"Rough Cut"	Eric Laneuville	Story by : Steve Lawson and Steve Bello; Teleplay by : Susan Lindner & Mitchell Fink	May 9, 1984	3321
While Fiscus gains popularity from his modeling debut and Caldwell tries to prepare for a weekend in Paris, the residents wait to hear who will be dropped from the program. Final episode: Kim Miyori as Dr. Wendy Armstrong. (Miyori is seen in the credits of the following episode, but this episode is her final appearance.)
44	22	"Hello and Goodbye"	Linda Day	John Masius and Tom Fontana	May 16, 1984	3322
The ER is shut down for repairs as Morrison goes on his first date since his wife's death, Craig's son (Scott Paulin) returns home after conquering his drug problem and Auschlander collapses in a stalled elevator. Debut episode: Byron Stewart as Warren Coolidge.

=== Season 3 (1984–85) ===
No. overall	No. in season	Title	Directed by	Written by	Original release date	Prod. code
45	1	"Playing God: Part 1"	Bruce Paltrow	John Masius and Tom Fontana	September 19, 1984	4301
A mother superior (Michael Learned) argues with Westphall over the fate of a critically injured nun (Priscilla Morrill), while the nurses may go on strike since Rosenthal and Auschlander can't negotiate a contract and three firemen are brought in with severe burns and injuries. Clancy (Helen Hunt) tells Morrison important news. Fiscus gives the new residents a tour of the hospital.
46	2	"Playing God: Part 2"	Bruce Paltrow	John Masius and Tom Fontana	September 26, 1984	4302
Westphall bans Sister Domenica (Michael Learned) from the hospital as Fiscus meets a young patient's fairy godmother (Tammy Grimes). Rosenthal brings a mediator (Herbert Edelman) into the negotiations and White comes back to work. Clancy (Helen Hunt) decides to have an abortion against Morrison's wishes.
47	3	"Two Balls and a Strike"	David Anspaugh	Story by : John Masius and Tom Fontana and John Tinker; Teleplay by : John Tinker	October 3, 1984	4303
As the rapist strikes again, Daniels stays behind when Rosenthal leads the nurses on strike. The Craigs see a therapist and Luther discovers the reason behind a firefighter's slow recovery.
48	4	"Strikeout"	Mark Tinker	Story by : John Masius and Tom Fontana and Steve Bello; Teleplay by : Steve Bello	October 17, 1984	4304
As Martin becomes the rapist's latest victim, the city threatens to close St. Eligius if the nurses' strike isn't settled and Lucy leaves the picket line to help with an emergency surgery with one of the fire fighters (Ernie Hudson). Because of the strike, Warren and Luther get extra work replastering the Craigs' kitchen walls.
49	5	"Breathless"	Eric Laneuville	Story by : John Masius and Tom Fontana; Teleplay by : Joel Surnow	October 24, 1984	4305
A psychiatric patient (Jim Lefebvre) confesses to the rapes, while the firefighter (John Hammond) who's been using drugs faces complications. An employee (Al Ruscio) gets asbestosis and Ehrlich gets divorced.
50	6	"My Aim is True"	Mark Tinker	Story by : John Masius and Tom Fontana; Teleplay by : Charles H. Eglee & Channing Gibson	October 31, 1984	4306
One firefighter gets a new face (Stephen Elliott), another develops claustrophobia. Auschlander hires an assistant, a cop loses his gun in the ER and Elliot becomes a hypochondriac while disagreeing with Wade over a patient. Shirley flirts with White.
51	7	"Fade to White"	David Anspaugh	Story by : John Masius and Tom Fontana; Teleplay by : Cynthia Darnell	November 7, 1984	4307
Morrison discovers the cause of a child's (Taliesin Jaffe) asthma attacks, while residents interview for a job in television and the surviving firefighters (Ernie Hudson, Stephen Elliott) celebrate their recovery. Doctors try to save White. A new orderly makes her presence known.
52	8	"Sweet Dreams"	Mark Tinker	John Masius and Tom Fontana	November 14, 1984	4308
The doctors and patients of St. Eligius have sleeping problems.
53	9	"Up on the Roof"	Eric Laneuville	Story by : John Tinker and Charles H. Eglee; Teleplay by : Steve Bello and Channing Gibson	November 21, 1984	4309
As a bone-marrow specialist (Caroline McWilliams) arrives to perform a transplant on feuding brothers (Harold Gould, Bill Macy), an accident happens while Morrison's neighbor watches Pete and Caldwell bids farewell to the last firefighter (Stephen Elliott). Shirley gives Cathy an important letter and finds herself on the roof.
54	10	"Girls Just Want to Have Fun"	Bruce Paltrow	Story by : Charles H. Eglee and Steve Bello; Teleplay by : Channing Gibson and John Tinker	November 28, 1984	4310
Auschandler proposes a risky procedure for Alexis (Brandy Gold), while the rumor Cavanero started comes back to hunt her and Chandler turns in a woman (Beah Richards) who's been illegally practicing medicine. Morrison and Fiscus are haunted by Shirley.
55	11	"Homecoming"	David Anspaugh	Story by : Steve Bello and Channing Gibson; Teleplay by : John Tinker and Charles H. Eglee	December 5, 1984	4311
A woman (Mimi Kennedy) returns home from a trip to find her ex-husband (John Schuck) getting weaker from the procedure he's going through to save their daughter (Brandy Gold), while Martin gives Fiscus a letter that could determine Daniels' fate.
56	12	"The Children's Hour"	William Daniels	Story by : Channing Gibson and John Tinker; Teleplay by : Charles H. Eglee and Steve Bello	December 12, 1984	4312
Westphall decides his son's future, while Martin leaves the psychiatric ward to help a fellow patient (Richard Maynard). Ehrlich helps a woman (Anne-Marie Martin) with an active libido and Rosenthal is confronted by her lover's wife (Beverly Sanders).
57	13	"Dr. Wyler, I Presume"	Mark Tinker	Story by : John Masius and Tom Fontana; Teleplay by : Cynthia Darnell	December 19, 1984	4313
The search for a kidney donor reunites Auschlander with a doctor (David Wayne) who's been in Africa for 40 years and Craig and Ehrlich find removing a bullet from a patient to be a very risky procedure.
58	14	"Whistle, Wyler Works"	David Anspaugh	Story by : John Masius and Tom Fontana; Teleplay by : Duncan Smith	January 2, 1985	4314
As Ehlrich stands by during Shalla's kidney transplant, Luther is recruited by a Caribbean medical school with questionable credentials that already has a "graduate" working at the hospital. Chandler treats a patient (Jay Tarses) who has one wife too many. Victor and Ellen have a heart to heart chat.
59	15	"Bye, George"	Mark Tinker	John Masius and Tom Fontana	January 9, 1985	4315
While Halloran tries to defend Morrison and Mrs. Hufnagel (Florence Halop) proposes marriage, a tragedy convinces Wyler (David Wayne) to leave Boston.
60	16	"Saving Face"	Charles Braverman	Story by : John Masius and Tom Fontana; Teleplay by : Jorge Zamacona and Norma Safford Vela	January 16, 1985	4316
Caldwell cares for a woman (Ann Hearn) with a disfigured disease, while Craig's 30th-anniversary celebration includes a visit from his brother (Lou Richards) and a new doctor (Karen Austin) takes over the ER.
61	17	"Give the Boy a Hand"	Janet Greek	Story by : John Masius and Tom Fontana; Teleplay by : Mitchell Fink & Marc Ross	January 23, 1985	4317
As Westphall tries to counsel his daughter (Dana Short) on her college pressures and Ehrlich ends his TV career, Woodley (Karen Austin) befriends a runaway pregnant woman (Lycia Naff), whose boyfriend (Timothy Van Patten) has set up a drug deal.
62	18	"Any Portrait in a Storm"	Leo Penn	Story by : John Masius and Tom Fontana; Teleplay by : Lyle Kessler	January 30, 1985	4318
Dean (Timothy Van Patten) leaves for Florida just as Maddy (Lycia Naff) goes into labor, while a phone repairman (John Corey) gets electrocuted in the hospital and Auschlander cancels his own tribute. Cathy returns to work.
63	19	"Red, White, Black and Blue"	Bruce Paltrow	Story by : John Masius and Tom Fontana; Teleplay by : Channing Gibson	February 13, 1985	4319
As Ehrlich reports a case of suspected child abuse and Shirley Daniels returns to St. Eligius, the staff goes on alert mode when the First Lady's motorcade passes through the area, while Westphall faces an ethical dilemma.
64	20	"Amazing Face"	Janet Greek	Story by : John Masius and Tom Fontana; Teleplay by : Charles H. Eglee	February 20, 1985	4320
While Westphall puts his house on the market and Daniels returns to the scene of the crime, the bandages are removed from a woman (Ann Hearn) operated on for disfigurement just as Mrs. Hufnagel (Florence Halop) is about to go under the knife herself.
65	21	"Murder, She Rote"	Mark Tinker	Tom Fontana and John Masius and Steve Bello	February 27, 1985	4321
Elliot goes on a date, Caldwell tries to get his patient (Ann Hearn) to leave her room, Mrs. Hufnagel (Florence Halop) finally leaves the hospital and Daniels is declared fit to return to work. Westphall sells his house.
66	22	"Tears of a Clown"	Janet Greek	Story by : Steve Bello, John Tinker, Charles H. Eglee and Channing Gibson; Teleplay by : John Masius and Tom Fontana	March 13, 1985	4322
A clown's multiple sclerosis gets worse, while Craig helps Westphall find a condo and Morrison's responsibilities take their toll on him. Fiscus meets Cathy's new lover. Axelrod finds out he is included in Mrs. Hufnagel's will.
67	23	"Bang the Eardrum Slowly"	David Anspaugh	Story by : John Masius and Tom Fontana; Teleplay by : Stephen Willey	March 20, 1985	4324
As Morrison learns the cause of his troubles and Elliot meets Mrs. Hufnagel's son (Boyd Bodwell) while mourning her passing with Auschlander, Luther's hearing is damaged in an explosion. Final episode: Cynthia Sikes as Dr. Annie Cavanero. (Sikes is seen in the credits of the following episode, but this episode is her final appearance.)
68	24	"Cheers"	Bruce Paltrow	John Masius and Tom Fontana and John Tinker	March 27, 1985	4323
Craig, Auschlander and Westphall have drinks at Cheers as they ponder the meaning of life. Katherine (Jane Wyatt) faces major surgery. Luther needs an Easter Bunny for the annual Easter egg hunt.

=== Season 4 (1985–86) ===
No. overall	No. in season	Title	Directed by	Written by	Original release date	Prod. code
69	1	"Remembrance of Things Past"	Bruce Paltrow	John Masius, Bruce Paltrow and Tom Fontana	September 18, 1985	5309
The hospital review board acquires a new member from the psychiatric floor; Chandler experiences long-suppressed resentments when he treats a Vietnamese patient (Le Tuan) and Dr. Turner counsels an upwardly mobile couple (George Deloy, Deborah May) who can't conceive a child. Debut episode: Alfre Woodard as Dr. Roxanne Turner.
70	2	"Fathers and Sons"	Mark Tinker	Story by : John Masius & Tom Fontana; Teleplay by : Duncan Smith	September 25, 1985	5302
The Craigs meet their pregnant daughter-in-law, Yvonne (Suzanne Lederer); the Valeres (George Deloy, Deborah May) continue to explore ways of having a child; Westphall's new policies irritate the residents and Auschlander; and Luther rides with a paramedic team (Adam Arkin, Melanie Chartoff) preoccupied with their personal grievances.
71	3	"Haunted"	Mark Tinker	Story by : John Masius & Tom Fontana; Teleplay by : Charles H. Eglee, Channing Gibson & John Tinker	October 23, 1985	5310
The Craigs face a tremendous loss as their first grandchild is born; a newly inspired Dr. Westphall returns to work full of ideas; and Fiscus invites himself up to Dr. Caldwell's Cape Cod retreat, where he sees a different side to the surgeon. Elliot and Marcy (Jeannie Elias) discover a common interest in food.
72	4	"The Naked and the Dead"	Leo Penn	Story by : John Masius & Tom Fontana; Teleplay by : Russ Woody	October 30, 1985	5303
Dr. Westphall tries to deal with his critical sister-in-law (Tanya Berezin) and a reluctant hospital board; Luther becomes Axelrod's personal trainer; Roxanne asks Chandler to her recital; Rosenthal worries over the threats of an assaulted teenager (Robert Romanus); Dr. Caldwell's questionable behavior continues at the hospital; and Dr. Craig proves to be of little help to his grieving wife.
73	5	"Slice O'Life"	Eric Laneuville	Story by : Tom Fontana, John Masius & John Tinker; Teleplay by : John Tinker	November 6, 1985	5304
Dr. Westphall drives himself too hard and is hospitalized; Yvonne's parents (Ramon Bieri, K Callan) arrive to see their daughter (Suzanne Lederer) and to claim their grandchild; Terri (Deborah May) has in-vitro fertilization; Fiscus makes a donation; and Dr. Caldwell picks up the wrong woman (Cristen Kauffman). Helen goes back to work on the floor. Dr. Westphall's insightful moving man (Todd Susman) checks into the hospital.
74	6	"Lost and Found in Space"	Robert Becker	Story by : John Masius & Tom Fontana; Teleplay by : Bob Rosenfarb	November 13, 1985	5305
An astronaut (David Ackroyd) lecturing in Boston collapses and is brought to St. Eligius; Papandrao and Rosenthal continue to clash; Axelrod loses both Marcy (Jeannie Elias) and his battle with the bulge; Dr. Craig impatiently assumes the responsibility for explaining the facts of life to an intellectually disabled young woman (Amanda Wyss); and Dr. Westphall hears some hard to take truths from his sister-in-law (Tanya Berezin).
75	7	"Close Encounters"	Eric Laneuville	Story by : John Masius & Tom Fontana; Teleplay by : Norma Safford Vela	November 20, 1985	5306
Dr. Craig arranges to take Yvonne (Suzanne Lederer) home to her parents; Ehrlich advises a plastic surgery patient behind Dr. Caldwell's back; Capt. Neal (Betty White) arrives to evaluate the astronaut's condition and to supervise his transfer to Walter Reed, despite Westphall and Morrison's objections; Chandler and Dr. Turner plan a vacation together; and John Doe #6 (Oliver Clark) decides he's Mary Richards and plans a party to celebrate.
76	8	"Watch the Skies"	Beth Hillshafer	Story by : John Masius & Tom Fontana; Teleplay by : Charles H. Eglee	November 27, 1985	5307
Mr. Galecki (Ramon Bieri) brings Barbara back to the Craigs; Dr. Turner leaves unexpectedly for her sleepy hometown down South; Rosenthal slaps Lucy; Jack takes his remedial exam and Colonel Cochrane (David Ackroyd) reconciles himself with God.
77	9	"Sanctuary"	Eric Laneuville	Story by : Tom Fontana, Channing Gibson & John Masius; Teleplay by : Channing Gibson	December 4, 1985	5308
Dr. Westphall learns that his new housekeeper (Edith Diaz) is an illegal immigrant who was tortured by the death squads in El Salvador; a nervous Ehrlich tries to get out of his OB-GYN rotation, and later delivers a baby; crackdowns on the homeless unearth a sarcophagus (Leah Ayres) and an old acquaintance of Wayne's (Mark Casella); Dr. Caldwell is chastised for letting his joking comments to Papandrao go too far in front of a patient.
78	10	"Loss of Power"	Mark Tinker	Story by : Bruce Paltrow & Mark Tinker; Teleplay by : John Masius & Tom Fontana	December 11, 1985	5323
A blackout brings past patients to the hospital. Fiscus proposes to Mona (Leah Ayres). Westphall is trapped in an elevator. Axelrod treats a patient (Richard Gilliland) who thinks he's a vampire. Caldwell receives bad news about a friend's mother. Rosenthal receives papers about a past mistake. John Doe (Oliver Clark) calls the FBI.
79	11	"Santa Claus is Dead"	Leo Penn	Charles H. Eglee, John Masius & Tom Fontana	December 18, 1985	5314
Axelrod tries to keep Santa Claus (Aaron Fletcher) alive after he collapses at a children's party; Ehrlich tries to brighten the holiday for his only obstetrical patient (Judyann Elder); Lizzie's boyfriend (Casey Siemaszko) finds the Westphalls' Christmas depressing; and Dr. Craig overindulges at his Christmas party.
80	12	"The Boom Boom Womb"	Nicholas Mele	Story by : John Masius & Tom Fontana; Teleplay by : Michael Moody	January 8, 1986	5312
An anti-abortionist (Rob Garrison) targets the hospital for bomb threats and Chandler is involved in trouble at the Boston Women's Clinic; Rosenthal decides what she must do with her youngest son (Ian Fried); Luther loses his favorite racing pigeon, whom he left in Axelrod's care; and Morrison tries to explain abortion to Pru (Amanda Wyss). Dr. Westphall's housekeeper (Edith Diaz) has her INS hearing. Mona (Leah Ayres) and Wayne quarrel.
81	13	"To Tell the Truth"	Mark Tinker	Story by : John Masius & Tom Fontana; Teleplay by : Steve Lawson	January 15, 1986	5313
Fiscus does his community outreach work with two cantankerous elderly people (John McIntire, Jeanette Nolan). An eccentric couple (Ellis Rabb, Carrie Nye) come to the hospital to claim John Doe (Oliver Clark). The Valeres (George Deloy, Deborah May) fight about adoption. Phil finds himself at the wrong place and the wrong time.
82	14	"Family Ties"	Allan Arkush	Story by : John Masius & Tom Fontana; Teleplay by : Judith Kahan	January 22, 1986	5315
The wealthy matriarch of an old Massachusetts family (Dorothy McGuire) is admitted for tests. Auschlander is cold towards Mrs. Endicott. Morrison prepares for his upcoming knee surgery. The Valeres (George Deloy, Deborah May) interview a surrogate (Annette McCarthy).
83	15	"Family Feud"	Mark Tinker	Story by : John Masius & Tom Fontana; Teleplay by : Frank Dandridge	January 29, 1986	5316
Augusta Endicott (Dorothy McGuire) learns that her family's medical problems are hereditary. A shooting occurs in the chapel. As Dr. Caldwell prepares for surgery to eliminate his facial scar, he discovers that he's been infected with the HIV virus.
84	16	"Family Affair"	Bruce Paltrow	Story by : John Masius & Tom Fontana; Teleplay by : Eric Overmyer	February 12, 1986	5317
The Endicotts try to adjust to losing a family member but gain good news about another; Dr. Caldwell's diagnosis of AIDS causes concern for his friends and a cooling in Fiscus and Clancy's relationship; and Ehrlich's outreach assignment involves the normal sized son (Adam Rich) of dwarf parents (Tommy Madden, Marcia DeRousse). Final episode: Nancy Stafford as Joan Halloran, Mark Harmon as Dr. Robert Caldwell. (Harmon is seen in the opening credits of the following two episodes, but this is his final appearance.)
85	17	"Time Heals (Part 1)"	Mark Tinker	Tom Fontana, John Masius & John Tinker	February 19, 1986	5318
St. Eligius' 50th anniversary spurs memories, including: its opening in 1935 under the leadership of Father Joseph McCabe (Edward Herrmann), the arrival of recently emigrated Helen Rosenthal and Mark's return as chief of surgery, Mark's bypass on Patrick O'Casey (William Russ) and the death of Maureen Westphall (Anita Gillette). Morrison struggles to diagnose a difficult patient (Brian Kerwin) and cope with the loss of Pete to a kidnapper. In 1997, TV Guide ranked this episode (along with part two) #44 on its list of the 100 Greatest Episodes. In 2009, it moved to #23.
86	18	"Time Heals (Part 2)"	Mark Tinker	Tom Fontana, John Masius & John Tinker	February 20, 1986	5301
St. Eligius' 50th anniversary spurs memories, including: the growing up of Donald Westphall, the arrival of young Daniel Auschlander (James Stephens) and his first meeting with Katharine (Devon Ericson), a drunken and embittered Father McCabe's departure, and the residency of Mark Craig under Dr. David Domedion (Jackie Cooper). The O'Casey family's long history with St. Eligius leads Morrison to a diagnosis. Pete is returned. In 1997, TV Guide ranked this episode (along with part one) #44 on its list of the 100 Greatest Episodes. In 2009, it moved to #23.
87	19	"Out on a Limb"	Eric Laneuville	Story by : John Masius & Tom Fontana; Teleplay by : Judith Kahan	February 26, 1986	5319
A former nurse, Carol Novino, returns to the hospital as a medical student. Morrison faces telling a young boy (R.J. Williams) he must have his arm amputated due to bone cancer. Ellen Craig is still grieving Steven while caring for her granddaughter. Axelrod and Fiscus go on a trip to Los Angeles. Debut episode: Cindy Pickett as Dr. Carol Novino.
88	20	"Come Home, Oh Sapien"	Allan Arkush	Story by : John Masius & Tom Fontana; Teleplay by : Michael Duggan	March 5, 1986	5320
Chandler receives a suicide call on his first night of outreach work on a crisis hotline. Ellen and Mark Craig separate. Novino has dinner with the Westphalls. Thanks to an endowment by the Endicotts, artist Alex Corey (Jeff Allin) returns. Rosenthal tells Axelrod news about Marcy (Jeannie Elias).
89	21	"Cheek to Cheek"	Helaine Head	Story by : John Masius & Tom Fontana; Teleplay by : Eric Overmyer	March 12, 1986	5321
Ehrlich tries to avoid giving a pelvic examination to Mrs. Craig on the last day of his OB/GYN rotation. Novino treats her favorite cartoonist (Eric Christmas) who is dying of lung cancer. Violence erupts when Morrison does his outreach work at a local prison and sees a familiar face (John Dennis Johnston).
90	22	"Black's Magic"	Beth Hillshafer	Charles H. Eglee, Tom Fontana, Channing Gibson, John Masius & John Tinker	March 19, 1986	5324
Dr. Turner returns to the hospital, and Phil Chandler spends the day searching for her. Luther questions his plan to become a paramedic. Auschlander finds himself in a crack house.
91	23	"The Equalizer"	Mark Tinker	Charles H. Eglee, Tom Fontana, Channing Gibson, John Masius & John Tinker	April 30, 1986	5325
Rosenthal is visited by her first husband (Dick Shawn) and youngest son (Ian Fried). Chandler is arrested at an anti-apartheid demonstration. Auschlander is disappointed Westphall won't back resident housing. Barbara is baptized.
92	24	"E.R."	Mark Tinker	Tom Fontana, Channing Gibson & John Masius	May 7, 1986	5326
The residents worry about who will be asked to return next year. A mugging victim (Patrick Collins) called Boston Massachusetts comes into the emergency room for treatment. Dr. Auschlander fears his own death. Westphall spends the night in a hotel. Craig lashes out and puts his career on the line. Final episode: Barbara Whinnery as Dr. Cathy Martin.

=== Season 5 (1986–87) ===
No. overall	No. in season	Title	Directed by	Written by	Original release date	Prod. code
93	1	"Where There's Hope, There's Crosby"	Bruce Paltrow	John Masius & Tom Fontana	September 24, 1986	6301
Father McCabe (Edward Herrmann), suffering from ALS, visits the hospital before being transferred to a convalescent home. Craig seeks the opinion of his medical school classmate, Dr. Todd Sweeney (Dakin Matthews), on treatment for his injured hand. Morrison comes back after his assault, then receives a surprise visitor.
94	2	"When You Wish Upon a Scar"	Mark Tinker	Story by : John Masius, Tom Fontana & John Tinker; Teleplay by : John Tinker	October 1, 1986	6302
The new resident, Seth Griffin, quickly winds up on Rosenthal's bad side. Jackie Wade tries to deal with her marital problems. Morrison introduces his new family to his St. Eligius family. Craig freezes during surgery. Debut episode: Bruce Greenwood as Dr. Seth Griffin. (Greenwood is seen in the opening credits of the previous episode, but this is his first appearance.)
95	3	"A Room With a View"	Eric Laneuville	Story by : Tom Fontana, Channing Gibson & John Masius; Teleplay by : Channing Gibson	October 8, 1986	6303
An elderly woman (Rosemary DeCamp) who watches Dr. Craig from her apartment across the street from the hospital becomes distressed when she sees that he is leaving. Dr. Birch treats a woman (Helen Page Camp) who has an unusual side effect from past chemotherapy. Fiscus helps two daughters (Christine Healy, Kathleen Lloyd) decide what to do with their dying father (George Petrie). Craig is rude to his replacement, Dr. Kiem. Debut episode: France Nuyen as Dr. Paulette Kiem.
96	4	"Brand New Bag"	Beth Hillshafer	Story by : Tom Fontana, John Masius & Eric Overmyer; Teleplay by : Eric Overmyer	October 15, 1986	6304
The Craigs try out yet another new maid (Elke Sommer); fellow employees stab Luther in the back; Axelrod is embarrassed and rude about a patient's colostomy; and Fiscus helps Mr. Ewell's daughter (Christine Healy) to take him home to die.
97	5	"You Beta Your Life"	Mark Tinker	Tom Fontana, John Masius & Mark Tinker	October 29, 1986	6305
After causing the death of a patient, Griffin plays Birch and Novino against each other in order to avoid taking blame. Westphall helps a dying boy (Jason Bateman) and his parents. Craig starts his memoirs.
98	6	"Not My Type"	Allan Arkush	Story by : Tom Fontana, John Masius & John Tinker; Teleplay by : Ann Reckling	November 5, 1986	6306
Turner operates on a patient (Rosalind Chao) whose religion forbids blood transfusions. Griffin shifts the blame for the patient's death to Birch, who is forced to resign but not before she punches Griffin in the face. John Doe #6 (Oliver Clark) returns as Dr. Craig's new typist.
99	7	"Up and Down"	Mark Tinker	Story by : Tom Fontana, Channing Gibson & John Masius; Teleplay by : Johnny Dawkins	November 12, 1986	6307
Westphall's daughter, Elizabeth (Dana Short), goes out with Griffin. Luther befriends a bag lady (Kathy Bates) with Tourette's syndrome. John Doe #6 (Oliver Clark) disappears and takes Dr. Craig's manuscript with him.
100	8	"Nothing Up My Sleeve"	Allan Arkush	Story by : Tom Fontana, John Masius & Eric Overmyer; Teleplay by : Norma Safford Vela	November 19, 1986	6308
Mandatory drug testing causes a deep division of opinion; Morrison is haunted by his day at the prison and refuses to tell Joanne (Patricia Wettig) what really happened; Axelrod is assigned to guide a 14-year-old medical student (Wil Wheaton) around; Griffin gets a warning from Dr. Westphall about hurting Lizzie (Dana Short); and Dr. Craig tries to perform magic tricks for some young patients and his housekeeper (Elke Sommer).
101	9	"After Life"	Mark Tinker	Tom Fontana, John Masius & John Tinker	November 26, 1986	6309
The hospital staff work to save the life of Wayne Fiscus after he's shot. In a coma, Fiscus dreams he's in heaven and reunited with a number of people from his past who have died, including Peter White (departed in season 3: "Up On The Roof"), Ralph (Richard Marcus) (departed in season 1: "Graveyard"), Eve Leighton (Marian Mercer) (departed in season 2: "All About Eve"), Murray Robbin (Murray Rubin) (departed in season 3: "Bye, George"). The hospital's namesake, Saint Eligius, makes an appearance. Saving Fiscus necessitates Craig's overcoming his hand injury.
102	10	"Once Upon a Mattress"	Helaine Head	Story by : Tom Fontana, John Masius & Channing Gibson; Teleplay by : Channing Gibson	December 3, 1986	6310
Fiscus is deeply depressed after his surgery, and no one can cheer him up except his hospital roommate (Todd Susman) who's just had a penile implant. Craig returns to the hospital and has another run-in with Dr. Kiem. Westphall makes a visit to an old friend, then decides to make an important purchase.
103	11	"Lost Weekend"	Eric Laneuville	Story by : Tom Fontana, John Masius & Eric Overmyer; Teleplay by : Eric Overmyer	December 10, 1986	6311
Dr. Westphall tries to help an alcoholic poet (Milo O'Shea) he once admired; Dr. Craig puts his usual worst foot forward as he tries to persuade the Soviets to release Masha's husband; Rosenthal confronts McPhail (Melinda Culea) about her drug problem; and Ehrlich makes friends with Papandrao's new boyfriend (Gregory Itzin) who suffers from narcolepsy.
104	12	"Cold War"	Peter Medak	Story by : Tom Fontana, Channing Gibson & John Masius; Teleplay by : Christopher Whitesell	January 7, 1987	6312
Dr. Turner finds her confidence shaken when she learns her new patient (Gayle Harbor), about to undergo a risky transfusion procedure, has a malpractice suit pending at another hospital; Dr. Peltrovich (Elya Baskin) arrives but has trouble getting licensed to practice medicine; and Morrison explodes during a mock war with paint guns.
105	13	"Russian Roulette"	Helaine Head	Story by : John Masius, Tom Fontana & John Tinker; Teleplay by : Ann Reckling	January 14, 1987	6313
Dr. Craig becomes jealous when Dr. Peltrovich (Elya Baskin) is finally allowed to pursue his work with lasers; Fiscus experiences an emotional rollercoaster as he returns to work with a critical leukemia patient (Mary McCusker); and Ehrlich hits highs and lows as he accepts his "Orphan of the Year" award.
106	14	"Visiting Daze"	Eric Laneuville	Story by : Tom Fontana & John Masius and Eric Overmyer; Teleplay by : D. Keith Mano	January 21, 1987	6314
Axelrod defers to Griffin and Novino. Luther visits Polly (Kathy Bates) and Dr. Kiem is unhappy with her long-distance marriage. Victor has visitors.
107	15	"Getting Ahead"	Allan Arkush	Tom Fontana, John Masius & Eric Overmyer	January 28, 1987	6315
Novino discovers that a hospital pathologist (Dierk Torsek) is selling body parts. John Doe #6 (Oliver Clark) has a book on the best-sellers list, the novel that was written by Dr. Craig. Dr. Craig runs into a college chum (Gerald Hiken). Fiscus has an ethical dilemma. Lizzie (Dana Short) has news for Griffin.
108	16	"Jose, Can You See?"	Eric Laneuville	Story by : Tom Fontana, John Masius & John Tinker; Teleplay by : John Tinker	February 4, 1987	6316
Novino gives shelter to a blind homeless man (Ray Charles). Auschlander finds out he has a son by former girlfriend Margaret Ryan (Geraldine Fitzgerald). Wade finds out she's farsighted. Ellen objects when Craig decides to redecorate Steven's old room and make it a nursery for Barbara.
109	17	"Schwarzwald"	Allan Arkush	Story by : John Masius, Tom Fontana & Chan Gibson; Teleplay by : James Kramer & Richard Kramer	February 11, 1987	6317
Rosenthal is shocked when she sees how much weight Marcy (Jeannie Elias) has gained. A fetal ultrasound reveals less than perfect results for a couple (Tony Goldwyn, Jane Daly) hoping for a perfect baby. Fiscus deals with a difficult patient (Harry Groener). Axelrod's veterinarian father (Louis Nye) comes on an official visit. Morrison receives a windfall and news about Nick Moats (John Dennis Johnston).
110	18	"You Again?"	Ron Abbott	Story by : Tom Fontana, John Masius & John Tinker; Teleplay by : Susan Kander	February 18, 1987	6318
Morrison testifies at Nick Moats' parole hearing; Dr. Kiem buries herself in work when she learns her son (Kenneth Jezek) has taken off from home and is missing; Fiscus diagnoses multiple sclerosis in an old college friend (Željko Ivanek); and the rumors fly that St. Eligius is about to become a billing center for Boston General.
111	19	"Rites of Passage"	Eric Laneuville	Tom Fontana, Channing Gibson & John Masius	February 25, 1987	6319
A woman (Patricia Gaul) artificially inseminated with Fiscus's sperm gives birth. Three young boys (Thomas Wilson Brown, Christian Hoff, Ian Giatti) bond while sharing a room. Westphall is reunited with an old friend who reminds him that he broke a promise. Morrison finds out Nick Moats (John Dennis Johnston) was granted parole.
112	20	"Women Unchained"	Michael Fresco	Story by : Tom Fontana, John Masius & Eric Overmyer; Teleplay by : Russ Woody	March 4, 1987	6320
Shirley Daniels returns to the hospital as a patient; Mrs. Craig offers Griffin a place to stay; Chandler and Novino compete to see who can correctly diagnose a difficult patient; and Ehrlich and Papandrao face wedding rumors when they return from Mexico. Morrison receives a phone call by Nick Moats (John Dennis Johnston). Final episode: Ellen Bry as Shirley Daniels.
113	21	"Good Vibrations"	Bruce Paltrow	Tom Fontana, Channing Gibson, John Masius & John Tinker	May 13, 1987	6323
Flashbacks occur as a representative from the hospital's new owner comes to visit.
114	22	"Slip Sliding Away"	John Heath	Story by : John Masius & Tom Fontana; Teleplay by : John Tinker, Channing Gibson & Eric Overmyer	May 20, 1987	6321
Luther tries to find out who is responsible for the mercy killings at St. Eligius. Turner performs risky fetal heart surgery. Yvonne (Suzanne Lederer) comes to the Craig's home to take Barbara back to Clinton. Morrison gets a gun to protect himself and his family. Everyone gets an unwelcome surprise with their paychecks.
115	23	"Last Dance at the Wrecker's Ball"	Eric Laneuville	Tom Fontana & John Masius	May 27, 1987	6322
Auschlander tries to stop the demolition of St. Eligius. Nick Moats (John Dennis Johnston) makes a final visit to the Morrisons. Ellen embarrasses Craig at a party.

=== Season 6 (1987–88) ===
No. overall	No. in season	Title	Directed by	Written by	Original release date	Prod. code
116	1	"Resurrection"	Bruce Paltrow	Channing Gibson & John Tinker	September 16, 1987	7301
St. Eligius reopens after the hospital is bought by the Ecumena corporation, led by Chief of Services John Gideon. Craig begins work designing an artificial heart. Residents come back, some happy to return, others less so. Debut episode: Ronny Cox as Dr. John Gideon.
117	2	"The Idiot and the Odyssey"	Mark Tinker	Channing Gibson, John Masius & John Tinker	September 23, 1987	7303
Westphall and John Gideon lock horns over a proposed AIDS clinic. Dr. Kiem uses hypnosis as a surgical anesthetic. Morrison has a confrontation with Joanne's ex husband (Allen Williams). Final episode: Kavi Raz as Dr. Vijay Kochar.
118	3	"A Moon For the Misbegotten"	Mark Tinker	Story by : Channing Gibson & John Tinker; Teleplay by : Tom Fontana	September 30, 1987	7302
Fed up with Gideon's refusal to set up an AIDS clinic, Westphall quits but not before he moons Gideon. Fiscus's mother (Lainie Kazan) visits the emergency room, and Luther tries to keep a man (Richard Kline) who thinks he's pregnant out of the psychiatric unit.
119	4	"Ewe Can't Go Home Again"	Eric Laneuville	Channing Gibson, Eric Overmyer & John Tinker	October 21, 1987	7304
Craig gives Ehrlich marital advice while his own marriage is falling apart. The staff takes their grievances against John Gideon to Dr. Auschlander. Rosenthal learns that one of her nurses (Penelope Ann Miller) is epileptic. Lizzie (Dana Short) cleans out her dad's office.
120	5	"Night of the Living Bed"	Michael Fresco	Channing Gibson, John PiRoman & John Tinker	October 28, 1987	7305
Chandler tries to diagnose a friend (Hector Elias) of John Gideon's in his campaign to become chief resident. Ellen Craig meets Gideon, who takes a liking to her. The hospital bed in which Mrs. Hufnagel (Florence Halop) died appears to be haunted.
121	6	"The He-Man Woman Hater's Club"	Eric Laneuville	Story by : Channing Gibson & John Tinker; Teleplay by : Emily Potter	November 4, 1987	7306
Craig and Ehrlich attend a meeting of an all-male medical society. Gideon offers Ellen a job in the hospital, and Chandler is appointed chief resident.
122	7	"Handoff"	David Morse	Story by : Channing Gibson & John Tinker; Teleplay by : Glen Merzer	November 11, 1987	7307
Novino, Ehrlich, and Chandler screen candidates for Craig's artificial heart. Ellen has lunch with Gideon in the hospital cafeteria.
123	8	"Heart On"	Michael Fresco	Channing Gibson & John Tinker	November 18, 1987	7308
Craig proceeds with the artificial heart implant, but the patient (John Kellogg) develops complications. Brett Johnson and his partner are beaten up in a gay bashing incident, causing Griffin to have a change of heart.
124	9	"Weigh In, Way Out"	Mark Tinker	Tom Fontana, Channing Gibson & John Tinker	December 2, 1987	7309
Fiscus pulls one last prank on Gideon before turning thirty; Morrison and Novino compete to deliver the 100,000th baby at St. Eligius; Dr. Craig puts on the boxing gloves again; and Lucy walks the Freedom Trail with a dying man (Charles Lane).
125	10	"No Chemo, Sabe?"	Eric Laneuville	Story by : Channing Gibson & John Tinker; Teleplay by : Douglas Steinberg	December 9, 1987	7310
Axelrod's cousin Pee-Wee (Matt Frewer) checks in and checks out Novino; Fiscus tries to help his father (Bill Dana) deal with his stroke; Mr. Spooner (John Kellogg) takes his first post surgery steps with the media in full attendance; and Dr. Auschlander considers his future medical treatment.
126	11	"A Coupla White Dummies Sitting Around Talking"	David Morse	Story by : Channing Gibson & John Tinker; Teleplay by : D. Keith Mano	December 16, 1987	7311
A man (Alan Young) claiming to be the true inventor of the Craig 9000 kidnaps Ehrlich; AIDS patient Brett Johnston's rib injuries have led to pneumonia and he is now determined to break with his lover; Dr. Kiem helps Amy Jeffries (Rosemary DeCamp), a lonely St. Eligius neighbor; Griffin treats a driven young broker (Joseph Kell) determined to make a million before he dies; Lucy worries that she might be pregnant; Helen returns to work; the company that owns the hospital finds itself sued for infringement and Mrs. Spooner (Neva Patterson) ends her husband's suffering.
127	12	"Final Cut"	Beth Hillshafer	Story by : Channing Gibson & John Tinker; Teleplay by : Jim Kramer	January 6, 1988	7312
A patient (Todd Susman) returns to the hospital to have his circumcision reversed. Morrison is upset when his son is rejected by an exclusive private school.
128	13	"Heaven's Skate"	Mark Tinker	Story by : Channing Gibson & John Tinker; Teleplay by : Ann Reckling	January 13, 1988	7313
Judge Farnham (Jack Dodson) is helped by newcomer chaplain Claire McCabe (Shelly Gibson). Craig goes on a date, and Rosenthal is upset when she learns of Bobby Caldwell's death from AIDS. Griffin has a spiritual awakening.
129	14	"Curtains"	John Heath	Story by : Channing Gibson & John Tinker; Teleplay by : Lydia Woodward	February 3, 1988	7314
Morrison treats a family affected by Huntington's disease. Rosenthal's drug abuse escalates. A trustee (Jeff Allin) of the hospital loses a battle.
130	15	"Fairytale Theater"	Michael Fresco	Story by : Channing Gibson & John Tinker; Teleplay by : Grace McKeaney & Lydia Woodward	February 10, 1988	7315
Craig is uncharacteristically upset when his sheep dies. Novino treats a patient (Marie Denn) who has been asleep for sixty years.
131	16	"Down and Out On Beacon Hill"	Eric Laneuville	Channing Gibson & John Tinker	February 17, 1988	7316
Ehrlich tries to console Lucy when she loses the baby. Fiscus treats a patient (Olivia Barash) with cystic fibrosis. Gideon suspends Craig due to the Spooner family's malpractice suit, and Rosenthal checks herself in to the chemical dependency unit.
132	17	"Their Town"	Mark Tinker	Story by : Tom Fontana, Channing Gibson & John Tinker; Teleplay by : Sagan Lewis	April 20, 1988	7317
Westphall, now living in New Hampshire, has visitors for his birthday. Ellen walks around her hometown. Novino gets into a work dispute between three carpenters (Candy Clark, Jack Kehler, Doug Dirkson).
133	18	"The Naked Civil Surgeon"	Michael Fresco	Story by : Channing Gibson & John Tinker; Teleplay by : Grace McKeaney	April 27, 1988	7318
Surgeons are forced to operate in the nude during an infection study. Auschlander receives a visit from the son (Lawrence Pressman) he never knew.
134	19	"Requiem for a Heavyweight"	Bill Molloy	Story by : Channing Gibson & John Tinker; Teleplay by : Lydia Woodward	May 4, 1988	7319
Axelrod undergoes surgery after suffering a heart attack. Ellen ends her relationship with Gideon.
135	20	"Split Decision"	John Heath	Story by : Channing Gibson & John Tinker; Teleplay by : Aram Saroyan	May 11, 1988	7320
Craig returns to work while Rosenthal wonders if she'll ever work again. The residents have little time to mourn one of their own.
136	21	"The Abby Singer Show"	Eric Laneuville	Story by : Channing Gibson & John Tinker; Teleplay by : Tom Fontana	May 18, 1988	7321
Roxanne Turner returns, and Chandler decides to leave medicine and move to Mississippi with her. A fire disrupts the Doctor of the Year banquet, which was also honoring the third year residents, some of whom are leaving St. Eligius to become attendings. A number of the residents' parents visit for the dinner, including Jack's father (Tom Poston), Victor's parents (Steve Allen and Jayne Meadows Allen), Fiscus' mother (Lainie Kazan), while Axelrod's father (Louis Nye) arrives to clean out his son's belongings. Craig and Ellen discuss reconciliation. Wade deals with difficult parents (William Sadler, Cristine Rose) of a dying child, Debbie Oppeheimer (Judith Barsi). First year residents await results of boards and if they will be back next year. Final episode: Alfre Woodard as Dr. Roxanne Turner, Denzel Washington as Dr. Philip Chandler. (Washington is seen in the opening credits of the following episode, but this is his final series appearance.) Note: The episode title is an industry in-joke, which references St. Elsewhere crew member Abby Singer. In industry parlance, the "Abby Singer shot" is the next-to-last shot of the day, while this show is the next-to-last show of the series.
137	22	"The Last One"	Mark Tinker	Story by : Tom Fontana & Channing Gibson & John Tinker; Teleplay by : Bruce Paltrow & Mark Tinker	May 25, 1988	7322
Westphall agrees to take over the running of St. Eligius when Weigert sells the hospital back to the Boston diocese. Ellen is offered a job in Cleveland, and Craig agrees to go along with her. The hospital and the people who work there are revealed to be figments in the mind of an autistic boy who stared at a snowglobe with the hospital building inside of it. Note: A show known for black comedy and inside jokes, the series finale is filled with such, from the opening moment of Fiscus telling ER patient "General Sarnoff... cut down on the time you spend watching television" (the president of RCA, who launched NBC in 1926), to Orderly Coolidge dealing with (The Fugitive's) Dr. Richard Kimble and the One-Armed Man, to (The Andy Griffith Show's) Floyd the Barber working in the hospital, and numerous others.
