= List of awards and nominations received by St. Elsewhere =

List of awards won by St. Elsewhere
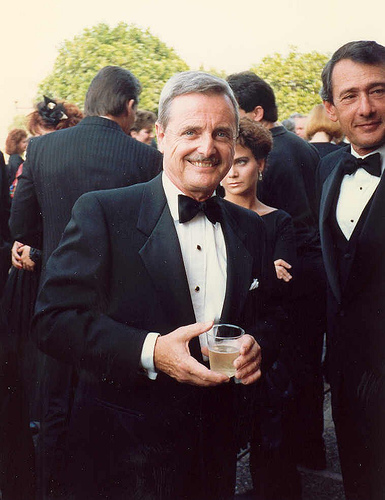
- William Daniels received many awards and nominations for his performance as Dr. Mark Craig
Awards and nominations
	Wins	Nominations
American Cinema Editors Awards	2	3
Artios Awards	1	4
Directors Guild of America Awards	0	5
Emmy Awards	13	62
Golden Globe Awards	0	5
Humanitas Prize	1	7
Peabody Award	1	1
People's Choice Awards	1	1
TCA Awards	1	7
Q Awards	3	4
Writers Guild of America Award	1	7

Totals
Awards won	24
Nominations	106
- References

St. Elsewhere is an American television medical drama series created by Joshua Brand and John Falsey and produced by MTM Enterprises. The show originally aired in the United States on NBC between October 26, 1982 and May 25, 1988, with 137 episodes split over six seasons. The series follows the day-to-day life of the staff at St. Eligius Hospital, which is nicknamed "St. Elsewhere" for housing the rejects of the more prestigious hospitals.

St. Elsewhere amassed 106 nominations for various industry awards. This includes 62 Emmy awards (with 13 wins), 5 Golden Globe awards, 7 TCA awards (with one win), 4 Q awards (with three wins), 7 Directors Guild of America awards (one win) and 7 Writers Guild of America awards (one win). William Daniels, who portrayed Dr. Mark Craig, received the most awards and nominations, winning two Emmy Awards and two Q awards.

== ACE Eddie Awards ==
Presented since 1962, the Eddie Award is an annual accolade that was created by American Cinema Editors to award outstanding achievements in editing in television and film. St. Elsewhere received three nominations for the award for Best Edited Episode from a Television Series, winning twice for episodes edited by Robert P. Suppey.

Year	Category	Nominee	Episode	Result	Ref.
1986	Best Edited Episode from a Television Series	Robert P. Suppey	"Haunted"	Won	
1987	Best Edited Episode from a Television Series	John Heath	"Afterlife"	Nominated	
1988	Best Edited Episode from a Television Series	Robert P. Suppey	"The Idiot and the Odyssey"	Won	

== Artios Awards ==
Presented by the Casting Society of America, the Artios Award is an annual accolades honoring outstanding achievements in casting. St. Elsewhere received four nominations during its tenure, winning once in 1986.

Year	Category	Nominee	Result	Ref.
1985	Best Casting for TV, Comedy Episodic	Eugene Blythe	Nominated	
1986	Best Casting for TV, Comedy Episodic	Eugene Blythe	Won	
1987	Best Casting for TV, Comedy Episodic	Eugene Blythe	Nominated	
1988	Best Casting for TV, Comedy Episodic	Eugene Blythe	Nominated	

== Directors Guild of America Awards ==
The Directors Guild of America Award is an annual accolade presented by the Directors Guild of America (DGA) which awards outstanding achievements in the field of directing. St. Elsewhere received five nominations during its tenure.

Year	Category	Nominee	Episode	Result	Ref.
1985	Outstanding Directorial Achievement in a Drama Series	David Anspaugh	"Fade to White"	Nominated	
1985	Outstanding Directorial Achievement in a Drama Series	Mark Tinker	"Sweet Dreams"	Nominated	
1987	Outstanding Directorial Achievement in a Drama Series	Mark Tinker	"Afterlife"	Nominated	
1988	Outstanding Directorial Achievement in a Drama Series	Mark Tinker	"Weigh In, Way Out"	Nominated	
1989	Outstanding Directorial Achievement in a Drama Series	Mark Tinker	"The Last One"	Nominated	

== Emmy Awards ==
Presented by the Academy of Television Arts & Sciences since 1949, the Primetime Emmy Award is an annual accolade that honors outstanding achievements in various aspects of television such as acting, directing and writing. St. Elsewhere received 62 nominations, winning thirteen awards. William Daniels and Ed Flanders each received five nominations for Outstanding Lead Actor in a Drama Series, with Daniels winning twice and Flanders winning once. In the supporting actor categories, Doris Roberts and Bonnie Bartlett won for Outstanding Supporting Actress in a Drama Series while James Coco won for Outstanding Supporting Actor in a Drama Series. Ed Begley, Jr. was nominated for Outstanding Supporting Actor in a Drama Series every year the series was broadcasting while Christina Pickles was nominated for Outstanding Supporting Actress in a Drama Series five times. The series won the award for Outstanding Writing for a Drama Series twice in 1984 and 1986 while winning in 1988 for Outstanding Directing for a Drama Series.

The Creative Arts Emmy Award is a branch of the Primetime Emmy Awards that recognizes performances in technical areas in television such as cinematography, costume design, theme music and sound mixing. The series received 12 nominations in the area, winning three awards in 1986 for Outstanding Achievement in Costuming for a Series, Outstanding Art Direction for a Series, and Outstanding Sound Mixing for a Drama Series.

=== Primetime Emmy Awards ===
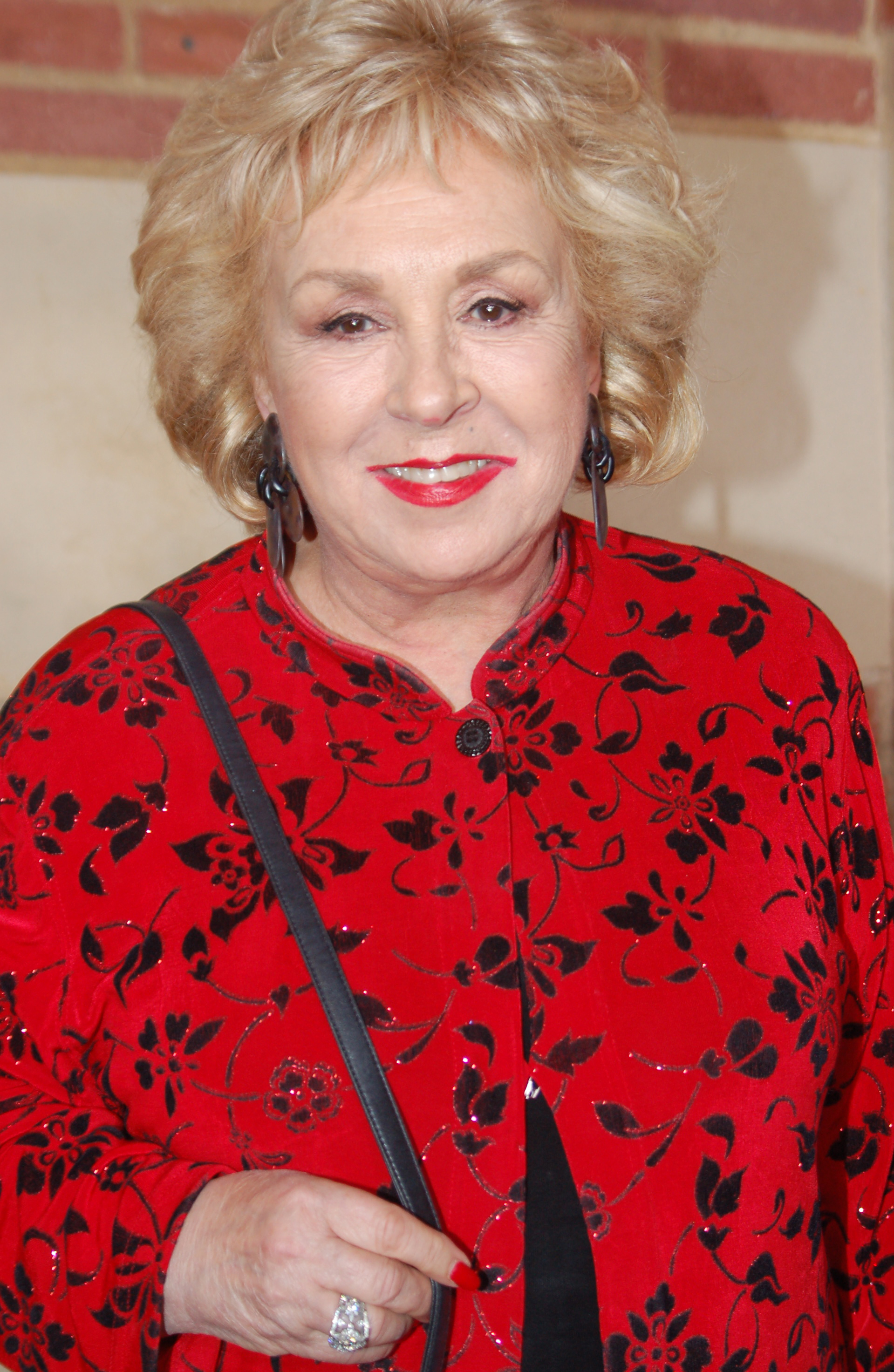
Doris Roberts won in 1983 for her role as Cora.

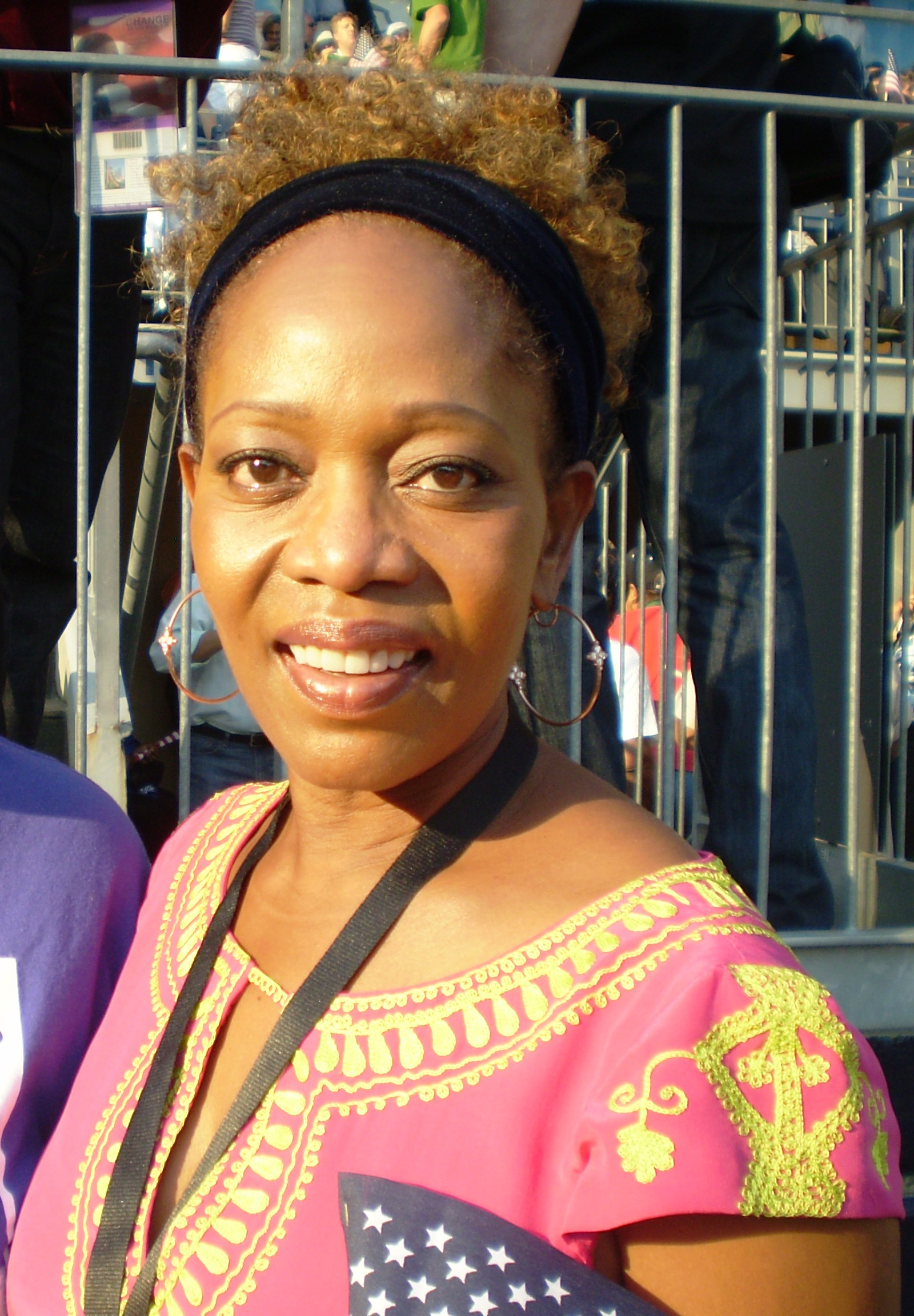
Alfre Woodard was nominated for Outstanding Lead Actress and Outstanding Guest Actress in a Drama Series for her role as Dr. Roxanne Turner.

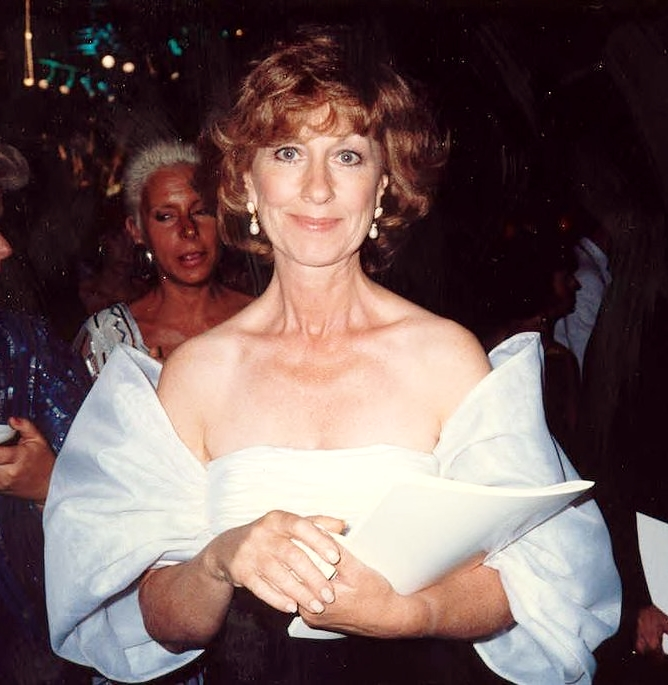
Christina Pickles was nominated five times for her performance on the series.

Year	Category	Nominee(s)	Result	Ref.
1983	Outstanding Drama Series	Joshua Brand, John Falsey, John Masius, Bruce Paltrow, and Mark Tinker	Nominated	
1983	Outstanding Lead Actor in a Drama Series	William Daniels	Nominated	
1983	Outstanding Lead Actor in a Drama Series	Ed Flanders	Won	
1983	Outstanding Supporting Actor in a Drama Series	Ed Begley Jr.	Nominated	
1983	Outstanding Supporting Actor in a Drama Series	James Coco as Arnie for "Cora and Arnie"	Won	
1983	Outstanding Supporting Actress in a Drama Series	Christina Pickles as Nurse Helen Rosenthal	Nominated	
1983	Outstanding Supporting Actress in a Drama Series	Doris Roberts as Cora for "Cora and Arnie"	Won	
1984	Outstanding Drama Series	Tom Fontana, John Masius, Bruce Paltrow, Abby Singer, and Mark Tinker	Nominated	
1984	Outstanding Lead Actor in a Drama Series	William Daniels	Nominated	
1984	Outstanding Lead Actor in a Drama Series	Ed Flanders	Nominated	
1984	Outstanding Supporting Actor in a Drama Series	Ed Begley Jr.	Nominated	
1984	Outstanding Supporting Actress in a Drama Series	Piper Laurie as Fran Singleton for "Lust et Veritas"	Nominated	
1984	Outstanding Writing in a Drama Series	Tom Fontana and John Masius for "All About Eve"	Nominated	
1984	Outstanding Writing in a Drama Series	John Ford Noonan, John Masius and Tom Fontana for "The Women"	Won	
1984	Outstanding Writing in a Drama Series	John Masius, Tom Fontana, Garn Stephens, Emilie R. Small for "Newheart"	Nominated	
1984	Outstanding Writing in a Drama Series	Mark Tinker, John Tinker, John Masius and Tom Fontana for "Qui Transulit Sustinet"	Nominated	
1985	Outstanding Drama Series	Tom Fontana, John Masius, Bruce Paltrow, Abby Singer, and Mark Tinker	Nominated	
1985	Outstanding Lead Actor in a Drama Series	William Daniels	Won	
1985	Outstanding Lead Actor in a Drama Series	Ed Flanders	Nominated	
1985	Outstanding Supporting Actor in a Drama Series	Ed Begley Jr.	Nominated	
1985	Outstanding Supporting Actress in a Drama Series	Christina Pickles	Nominated	
1985	Outstanding Writing in a Drama Series	Tom Fontana, John Masius and Steve Bello for "Murder, She Rote"	Nominated	
1985	Outstanding Writing in a Drama Series	Tom Fontana and John Masius for "Sweet Dreams"	Nominated	
1986	Outstanding Drama Series	Tom Fontana, John Masius, Bruce Paltrow, Abby Singer, and Mark Tinker	Nominated	
1986	Outstanding Lead Actor in a Drama Series	William Daniels as Dr. Mark Craig for "Haunted"	Won	
1986	Outstanding Lead Actor in a Drama Series	Ed Flanders as Dr. Donald Westphall	Nominated	
1986	Outstanding Lead Actress in a Drama Series	Alfre Woodard as Dr. Roxanne Turner	Nominated	
1986	Outstanding Supporting Actor in a Drama Series	Ed Begley Jr.	Nominated	
1986	Outstanding Supporting Actress in a Drama Series	Bonnie Bartlett as Ellen Craig	Won	
1986	Outstanding Supporting Actress in a Drama Series	Christina Pickles	Nominated	
1986	Outstanding Writing in a Drama Series	Charles H. Eglee, John Tinker, Channing Gibson, John Masius, and Tom Fontana for "Haunted"	Nominated	
1986	Outstanding Writing in a Drama Series	Tom Fontana, John Tinker, John Masius for "Time Heals"	Won	
1987	Outstanding Drama Series	Tom Fontana, John Masius, Bruce Paltrow, Abby Singer, and Mark Tinker	Nominated	
1987	Outstanding Lead Actor in a Drama Series	William Daniels	Nominated	
1987	Outstanding Lead Actor in a Drama Series	Ed Flanders	Nominated	
1987	Outstanding Supporting Actor in a Drama Series	Ed Begley Jr.	Nominated	
1987	Outstanding Supporting Actress in a Drama Series	Bonnie Bartlett as Ellen Craig	Won	
1987	Outstanding Supporting Actress in a Drama Series	Christina Pickles	Nominated	
1987	Outstanding Guest Performer in a Drama Series	Steve Allen as Lech Osoranski for "Visiting Daze"	Nominated	
1987	Outstanding Guest Performer in a Drama Series	Edward Herrmann as Father Joseph McCabe for "Where There's Hope, There's Crosby"	Nominated	
1987	Outstanding Guest Performer in a Drama Series	Jayne Meadows as Holga Oseransky for "Visiting Daze"	Nominated	
1987	Outstanding Writing in a Drama Series	John Tinker, Tom Fontana, and John Masius for "Afterlife"	Nominated	
1988	Outstanding Drama Series	Channing Gibson, John Masius, Bruce Paltrow, Abby Singer, and Mark Tinker	Nominated	
1988	Outstanding Supporting Actor in a Drama Series	Ed Begley Jr.	Nominated	
1988	Outstanding Supporting Actress in a Drama Series	Bonnie Bartlett for "Their Town"	Nominated	
1988	Outstanding Supporting Actress in a Drama Series	Christina Pickles for "Down and Out of Beacon Hill"	Nominated	
1988	Outstanding Guest Performer in a Drama Series	Lainie Kazan as Frieda Fiscus for "The Abby Singer Show"	Nominated	
1988	Outstanding Guest Performer in a Drama Series	Alfre Woodard for "The Abby Singer Show"	Nominated	
1988	Outstanding Directing in a Drama Series	Mark Tinker for "The Abby Singer Show" "Weigh In, Weigh Out"	Won	
1988	Outstanding Writing in a Drama Series	Bruce Paltrow, Mark Tinker, Tom Fontana, John Tinker and Channing Gibson for "The Abby Singer Show" "The Last One"	Nominated	

=== Creative Arts Emmy Awards ===
Year	Category	Nominee(s)	Episode	Result	Ref.
1983	Outstanding Art Direction for a Series	Ernie Bishop, Michele Guiol, James Hulsey, and Jacqueline Webber	"Pilot"	Nominated	
1983	Outstanding Film Sound Editing for a Series	Don Ernst, Avram Gold, Jere Goling, Sam Horta, Constance Kazmer and Gary Krivacek	"Working"	Nominated	
1983	Outstanding Film Sound Mixing for a Series	John B. Asman, William Nicholson, Ken S. Polk and Dean S. Vernon	"The Count"	Nominated	
1984	Outstanding Achievement in Music Composition for a Series (Dramatic Underscore)	J. A. C. Redford	"In Sickness and Health"	Nominated	
1984	Outstanding Art Direction for a Series	Patricia S. Bruner and Jacqueline Webber	"After Dark"	Nominated	
1985	Outstanding Film Sound Mixing for a Series	John B. Asman, William Nicholson, Ken S. Polk and Dean S. Vernon	"Sweet Dreams"	Nominated	
1985	Outstanding Music Composition for a Series (Dramatic Underscore)	J. A. C. Redford	"Fade to White"	Nominated	
1986	Outstanding Achievement in Costuming for a Series	Charles Drayman, Robert M. Moore, Kathy O'Rear, Susan Smith-Nashold and Anne Winsor	"Time Heals"	Won	
1986	Outstanding Art Direction for a Series	Norman Rockett and Jacqueline Webber	"Time Heals"	Won	
1986	Outstanding Film Sound Editing for a Series	Mark Crookston, Dan Garde, Andrew Horta, Constance Kazner, Brian F. Mars, John Robinson and Kevin Spears	"Time Heals", Part I	Nominated	
1986	Outstanding Sound Mixing for a Drama Series	William Gazecki, Andrew MacDonald, Bill Nicholson and Blake Wilcox	"Time Heals", Part II	Won	
1987	Outstanding Editing for a Series (Single Camera Production)	John Heath	"Afterlife"	Nominated	

== Golden Globe Awards ==
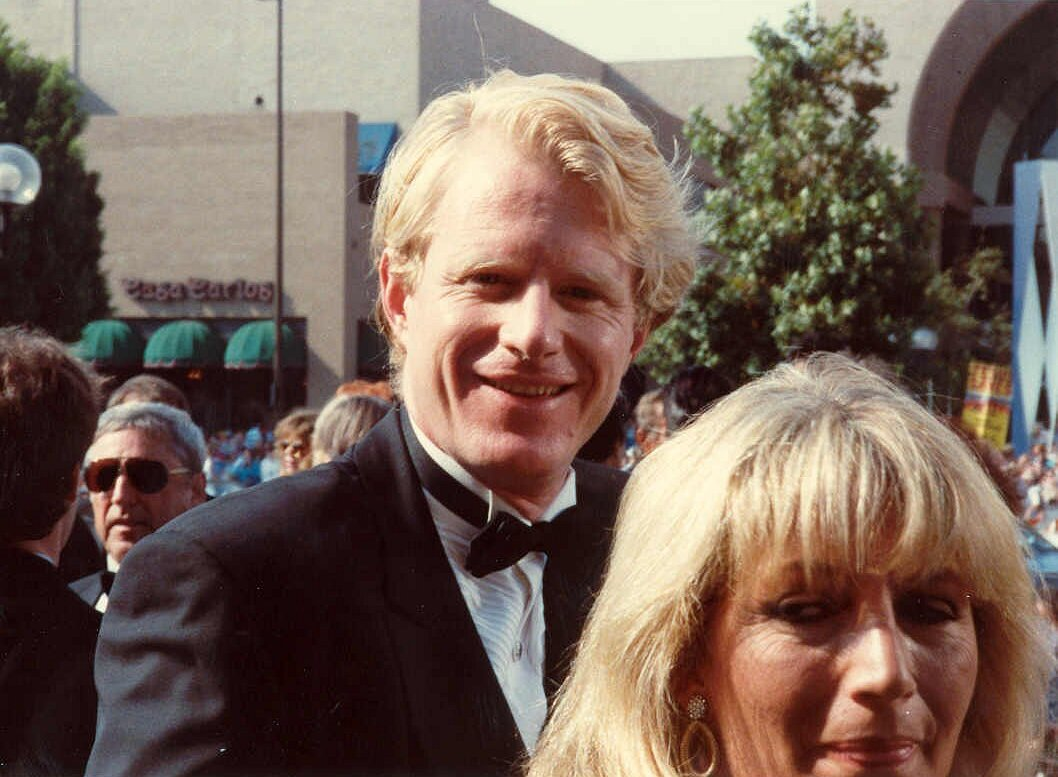
Ed Begley, Jr. was nominated for a Golden Globe in 1986

The Golden Globe Award is an annual accolade presented by the Hollywood Foreign Press Association (HFPA) which honors the best performances in television and film. St. Elsewhere was nominated four consecutive times for Best Television Series – Drama while Ed Begley, Jr. was nominated once for Best Supporting Actor – Series, Miniseries or Television Film.

Year	Category	Nominee	Result	Ref.
1984	Best Television Series – Drama		Nominated	
1985	Best Television Series – Drama		Nominated	
1985	Best Supporting Actor – Series, Miniseries or Television Film	Ed Begley Jr.	Nominated	
1986	Best Television Series – Drama		Nominated	
1987	Best Television Series – Drama		Nominated	

== Humanitas Prize ==
Awarded since 1974, the Humanitas Prize is an annual accolade that recognizes outstanding achievement of writers in film and television whose work promotes human dignity, meaning and freedom. St. Elsewhere received seven nominations for the award in the 60 Minute Category, winning once in 1985.

Year	Category	Nominee(s)	Episode	Result	Ref.
1983	60 Minute Category	Tom Fontana (teleplay and story), John Falsey (story), Joshua Brand (story)	"Rain"	Nominated	
1984	60 Minute Category	John Masius and Tom Fontana	"All About Eve"	Nominated	
1984	60 Minute Category	John Masius and Tom Fontana	"Ties That Bind"	Nominated	
1985	60 Minute Category	John Masius and Tom Fontana		Won	
1986	60 Minute Category	Channing Gibson (teleplay and story), John Masius (story), Tom Fontana (story)	"Sanctuary"	Nominated	
1987	60 Minute Category	Channing Gibson (teleplay and story), John Masius (story), Tom Fontana (story)	"A Room with a View"	Nominated	
1987	60 Minute Category	John Masius and Tom Fontana	"Where There's Hope, There's Crosby"	Nominated	

== Peabody Awards ==
Awarded since 1940, the Peabody Award, named after American banker and philanthropist George Peabody, is an annual award the recognizes excellence in storytelling across mediums including television, radio, television networks, and online videos. St. Elsewhere won the award for the year of 1984, with the award committee praising it as "distinguished television, set apart from other dramatic series by its depth of characterization, crisp and believable dialogue, and unusual variety in lighting, staging and photography."

Year	Nominee	Result	Ref.
1984	NBC Television, MTM Enterprises	Won	

== People's Choice Awards ==
The People's Choice Awards are an annual awards show, presented since 1975, which recognize the people and work of popular culture. St. Elsewhere won the award for Favorite New TV Dramatic Program in 1983.

Year	Category	Result	Ref.
1983	Favorite New TV Dramatic Program	Won	

== Television Critics Association Awards ==
Awarded by Television Critics Association since 1985, the Television Critics Association Award (TCA Award) is an annual accolade that recognizes outstanding achievements in television programming and acting performances. St. Elsewhere has received seven nominations—four for Outstanding Achievement in Drama and three for Program of the Year. The series won in 1988 for Outstanding Achievement in Drama.

Year	Category	Result	Ref.
1985	Program of the Year	Nominated	
1985	Outstanding Achievement in Drama	Nominated	
1986	Outstanding Achievement in Drama	Nominated	
1987	Program of the Year	Nominated	
1987	Outstanding Achievement in Drama	Nominated	
1988	Program of the Year	Nominated	
1988	Outstanding Achievement in Drama	Won	

== Viewers for Quality Television Awards ==
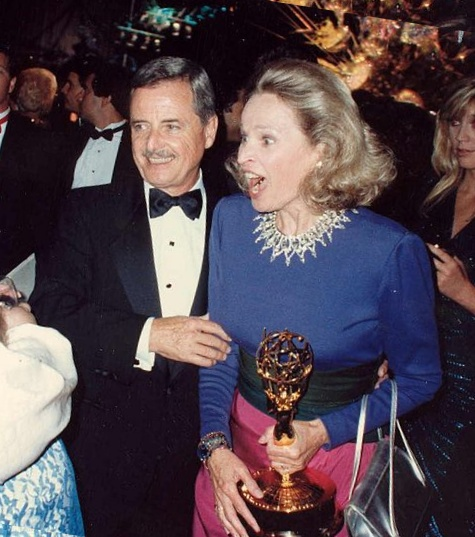
Husband and wife William Daniels and Bonnie Bartlett won 3 Q awards between them.

The Q Award, presented by the Viewers for Quality Television since 1986, recognizes critically acclaimed programs and performers for their outstanding achievements in television. St. Elsewhere received four nominations, winning three awards—two for Best Actor in a Quality Drama Series, awarded to William Daniels, and one for Best Supporting Actress in a Quality Drama Series, awarded to Bonnie Bartlett.

Year	Category	Nominee	Result	Ref.
1986	Best Actor in a Quality Drama Series	William Daniels	Won	
1987	Best Actor in a Quality Drama Series	William Daniels	Won	
1987	Best Supporting Actress in a Quality Drama Series	Bonnie Bartlett	Won	
1988	Best Actor in a Quality Drama Series	William Daniels	Nominated	

== Writers Guild of America Awards ==
Presented by the Writers Guild of America (WGA), the Writers Guild of America Award is an annual accolade that recognizes outstanding achievement of writers in film, television, radio, promotional writing and videogames. St. Elsewhere received seven nominations for Television: Episodic Drama, winning once in 1986.

Year	Category	Nominee(s)	Episode	Result	Ref.
1983	Television: Episodic Drama	John Masius and Tom Fontana	"Addiction"	Nominated	
1984	Television: Episodic Drama	John Ford Noonan (teleplay and story), John Masius (story) and Tom Fontana (story)	"The Women"	Nominated	
1984	Television: Episodic Drama	John Masius and Tom Fontana	"Hello, Goodbye"	Nominated	
1985	Television: Episodic Drama	John Masius and Tom Fontana	"Sweet Dreams"	Nominated	
1986	Television: Episodic Drama	John Masius, Bruce Paltrow and Tom Fontana	"Remembrance of Things Past"	Won	
1987	Television: Episodic Drama	Channing Gibson (teleplay and story), John Masius (story) and Tom Fontana (story)	"A Room with a View"	Nominated	
1988	Television: Episodic Drama	Tom Fontana (teleplay and story), John Tinker (story) and Channing Gibson (story)	"A Moon for the Misbegotten"	Nominated	
