= Fire Sale (film) =

1977 film by Alan Arkin

- Directed by: Alan Arkin
- Written by: Robert Klane; Based on his novel
- Produced by: Marvin Worth
- Starring: Alan Arkin; Rob Reiner; Vincent Gardenia; Anjanette Comer; Kay Medford; Sid Caesar; Byron Stewart
- Cinematography: Ralph Woolsey
- Edited by: Richard Halsey
- Music by: Dave Grusin
- Distributed by: 20th Century Fox
- Release date: June 8, 1977 (Los Angeles)
- Running time: 88 minutes
- Country: United States
- Language: English
- Budget: $1.5 million

Fire Sale is a 1977 American comedy film starring Alan Arkin (who also directed) as Ezra Fikus, Rob Reiner as his brother Russell, Vincent Gardenia as their father Benny, Sid Caesar as Benny's brother Sherman, Anjanette Comer as Marion (Ezra's wife), and Kay Medford as Ruth (Benny's wife).

== Plot ==
Benny Fikus decides to cash in on his business' fire insurance by committing arson. Benny plans to have Sherman, who is in a mental hospital believing that World War II is still being fought, escape and burn down Benny's failing Fikus & Son Department Store which he has made Sherman believe is a Nazi military headquarters.

During a vacation trip with Marion, Benny has a heart attack, and his sons Ezra and Russell take over the store. The low self-esteemed Russell wants to expand the store and marry his girlfriend, while Ezra needs money to adopt an orphaned 6'8" African-American teenage boy named Booker T (Byron Stewart). Ezra needs Booker T. to play on the Alfonso Bedoya High School basketball team he coaches because he has only won a total of two games in seven years as a coach, and therefore is in danger of losing his job.

Russell discovers that his father is bankrupt, with his only asset being the surrender value of the store's fire insurance policy. Russell cashes in the policy and splits it with Ezra, using the money to buy more store inventory. Back at home, Benny is practically comatose after his heart attack. An "in denial" Marion is told by house painters helping with a home redecoration project that her husband is "very sick" which she interprets as Benny being already dead. She then decides to change redecoration plans to prepare for funeral services.

Meanwhile, Sherman has escaped and is on his way to burn down the "Nazi headquarters" (as he believes the store is). Benny recovers from his heart attack, and informs Russell that Sherman is on his way to burn down the store, expecting to collect the fire insurance, that they no longer have.

Hilarity ensues as Ezra has his wife run his basketball team while he and Russell attempt to stop Sherman from his quest to fight the "Nazis" "by any means necessary".

== Cast ==
- Alan Arkin as Ezra Fikus
- Rob Reiner as Russell Fikus
- Vincent Gardenia as Benny Fikus
- Anjanette Comer as Marion Fikus
- Kay Medford as Ruth Fikus
- Barbara Dana as Virginia
- Sid Caesar as Sherman
- Alex Rocco as Al
- Oliver Clark as Mr. Blossom

== Background ==
The film was based on the book of the same name by Robert Klane, who had previously collaborated with producer Marvin Worth on the film adaptation of Where's Poppa?

This was Byron Stewart's first ever acting role and, per Ken Howard's commentary on The White Shadow Season 1 DVDs, got him the role of Warren Coolidge.

== Reception ==
The film was panned by critics. Gene Siskel of the Chicago Tribune gave the film half of one star out of four, calling it "a hideous comedy" with "tired racial slurs" in its script. On his year-end list of the worst films of 1977 in "decreasing order of lousiness," he named Fire Sale first. Arthur D. Murphy of Variety declared, "Alan Arkin's alleged comedy is a consummate sophomoric vulgarity [ . . . ] There's something basically loathsome about insensitive comedy which derives from physical and mental illness." Kevin Thomas of the Los Angeles Times called it "a lethally crass, singularly unfunny comedy" and "about as funny as arson." Gary Arnold of The Washington Post described the film as "boorish" and "animated by naked hostility and vindictiveness rather than satirical perception or adroitness." Leonard Maltin's film guide assigned its lowest possible grade of BOMB and called it "Truly unbearable."
