= Sagan Lewis =

American actress (1952–2016)

- Born: Susan Jane Lewis; November 30, 1952; Omaha, Nebraska, U.S.
- Died: August 7, 2016 (aged 63); Manhattan, New York City, U.S.
- Education: University of California, San Diego (MFA)
- Occupation(s): Actress, teacher
- Years active: 1977–2009
- Known for: Dr. Jacqueline Wade on St. Elsewhere; Judge Susan Aandahl on Homicide: Life on the Street
- Spouses: Tom Fontana (m. 1982; div. 1993) (m. 2015)
- Children: 1

Susan Jane Lewis (November 30, 1952 – August 7, 2016) was an American actress, best known for co-starring as Dr. Jacqueline Wade on the NBC medical drama St. Elsewhere. Her other television credits included a multiple-episode recurring role as Judge Susan Aandahl on NBC's Homicide: Life on the Street during the 1990s, and the television films Cocaine: One Man's Seduction (1983) and Full Ride.

Lewis was born in Omaha, Nebraska, and raised across the river in Council Bluffs, Iowa. She received her master of fine arts from the graduate acting program at the University of California, San Diego.

Lewis began acting professionally during the late 1970s. She met her future husband, television producer and screenwriter Tom Fontana, in 1978 while auditioning at the Williamstown Theatre Festival in Massachusetts. Fontana was working as an assistant to the theatre festival's artistic director at the time of their meeting.

In 1980, Lewis moved to Los Angeles when Fontana became a writer on the NBC drama, St. Elsewhere. She was soon co-starring on St. Elsewhere, when the showrunner, Bruce Paltrow, created the role of Dr. Jacqueline Wade specifically for her. She played Dr. Wade, a sensible, competent doctor with a sneakily impish sense of humor, throughout the show's six-year run; initially a rather minor recurring character, Dr. Wade became more prominent in later seasons. Using the name "S.J. Lewis", Lewis also wrote the teleplay for the sixth season St. Elsewhere episode "Their Town" -- an episode in which her character of Dr. Wade does not appear.

As she was working on St. Elsewhere, Lewis was seen in the final half hour of the series finale of M*A*S*H, "Goodbye, Farewell and Amen", in 1983. Lewis also appeared in several television films throughout the 1980s, including Cocaine: One Man's Seduction (1983), which starred Dennis Weaver, Dan Aykroyd, and Jeffrey Tambor.

Lewis was cast in a multiple-episode recurring role as Judge Susan Aandahl on Homicide: Life on the Street from 1995 to 1999.

Sagan Lewis and Tom Fontana married for the first time on December 18, 1982, at ceremony held at the Santa Monica home of Bruce Paltrow and his wife, actress Blythe Danner. They divorced in 1993. Following the divorce, Lewis moved to Maui and then to Sedona, Arizona, where she taught at the Zaki Gordon Institute of Independent Film (now known as the Sedona Film School) and served as the program director of the Sedona International Film Festival for seven years. She also gave birth to her son, Jade Scott Lewis, about three years after her divorce.

However, Lewis and Fontana later reconnected when her son went to graduate school in New York. Fontana proposed to her over the Christmas holiday in 2014. They remarried in July 2015 and remained together until her death from cancer in 2016. In an interview with the New York Times, published in the article "You Married Them Once, but What About Twice?" in March 2016, Lewis talked about her divorce and remarriage to Fontana, explaining, "I was sad when we split up. It was hard for both of us, but we knew it was necessary. He understood that I needed to explore other worlds." They held wedding parties in Tribeca (New York City), Los Angeles, Omaha (her hometown), and Buffalo, New York (Fontana's hometown). Lewis and Fontana wrote on their invitations, "After 22 years, the divorce didn't work out."

After a six-year battle with cancer, Lewis died at her home in Manhattan on August 7, 2016, at the age of 63.
