= Byron Stewart =

American actor

Byron Craig Stewart (born May 1, 1956 in Baxter Springs, Kansas) is an American actor best known for his portrayal of Warren Coolidge in the television series The White Shadow and the television medical drama St. Elsewhere.

Stewart's first credited acting role came in 1977 at age 21 in the movie Fire Sale, a comedy in which a Jewish basketball coach adopts a tall African-American teenage boy (played by Stewart) to help him win games. Ken Howard stated in The White Shadow season 1 DVD commentary that, after seeing a re-run of Fire Sale, he immediately phoned Bruce Paltrow and said he wanted Stewart for a role as one of his basketball players. Howard wanted at least one "player" taller than himself for the "team."

Stewart, who is 6'8" tall, later reprised the role of Warren Coolidge in another Paltrow-directed series, St. Elsewhere. The explanation was that Coolidge had to give up basketball because of an injury while in his sophomore year at Boston College. Due to his injury, he lost his scholarship, dropped out and became an orderly at St. Eligius Hospital.

Today, Stewart is a grandfather of eight living in Riverside County, California. He still occasionally reads for acting roles. He is divorced with four children.
