= St. Elsewhere =

American medical drama television series (1982–1988)

- Title card of season 1
- Genre: Medical drama
- Created by: Joshua Brand; John Falsey
- Developed by: Mark Tinker; John Masius
- Starring: Ed Flanders; David Birney; G. W. Bailey; Ed Begley Jr.; Terence Knox; Howie Mandel; David Morse; Christina Pickles; Kavi Raz; Cynthia Sikes Yorkin; Denzel Washington; William Daniels; Norman Lloyd; Ellen Bry; Mark Harmon; Eric Laneuville; Kim Miyori; Nancy Stafford; Stephen Furst; Bonnie Bartlett; Bruce Greenwood; Cindy Pickett; Ronny Cox; Sagan Lewis; France Nuyen; Jennifer Savidge; Byron Stewart
- Theme music composer: Dave Grusin
- Composers: Dave Grusin; J. A. C. Redford
- Country of origin: United States
- Original language: English
- No. of seasons: 6
- No. of episodes: 137 (list of episodes)

Production
- Executive producers: Mark Tinker; Bruce Paltrow
- Producers: John Masius; Tom Fontana
- Production locations: CBS Studio Center; Studio City, Los Angeles, California
- Running time: 45–48 minutes
- Production company: MTM Enterprises

Original release
- Network: NBC
- Release: October 26, 1982 – May 25, 1988

St. Elsewhere is an American medical drama television series created by Joshua Brand and John Falsey that originally ran on NBC from October 26, 1982, to May 25, 1988. The series stars Ed Flanders, Norman Lloyd, and William Daniels as teaching doctors at an aging, run-down Boston hospital who give interns a promising future in making critical medical and life decisions. The series was produced by MTM Enterprises, which had success with a similar NBC series, the police drama Hill Street Blues, during that same time. The series were often compared to each other for their use of ensemble casts and overlapping serialized storylines (an original ad for St. Elsewhere quoted a critic that called the series "Hill Street Blues in a hospital").

Recognized for its gritty, realistic drama, St. Elsewhere gained a small yet loyal following (the series never ranked higher than 47th place in the yearly Nielsen ratings) over its six-season, 137-episode run; however, the series also found a strong audience in Nielsen's 18–49 age demographic, a demo later known as a young, affluent audience that TV advertisers were eager to reach. The series also earned critical acclaim during its run, earning 13 Emmy Awards for its writing, acting, and directing, and is widely regarded as one of the greatest television shows of all time.

== Overview ==
St. Elsewhere was set at the fictional St. Eligius Hospital, a decaying urban teaching hospital in Boston's South End neighborhood. (The South End's Franklin Square House Apartments, formerly known as the St. James Hotel and located next to Franklin and Blackstone Squares, stood in for the hospital in establishing shots, including the series' opening sequence.)

In the pilot episode, surgeon Dr. Mark Craig (William Daniels) informs his colleagues that the local Boston media had bestowed the derogatory nickname upon St. Eligius since they perceived the hospital as "a dumping ground, a place you wouldn't want to send your mother-in-law." In fact, the hospital was so poorly regarded that its shrine to Saint Eligius was commonly defiled by the hospital's visitors and staff. Despite the hospital's reputation, they employed some first-rate doctors—including Craig, a world-class heart surgeon. As well, their administrative staff was shown to care deeply about the hospital's mission, even as they dealt with a lack of up-to-date equipment, funding, and experienced personnel.

Just as in Hill Street Blues, St. Elsewhere employed a large ensemble cast, a gritty, "realistic" visual style, and a multitude of interlocking serialized stories, many of which continued over the course of multiple episodes or seasons. In the same way Hill Street was regarded as a groundbreaking police drama, St. Elsewhere also broke new ground in medical dramas, creating a template that influenced ER, Chicago Hope, and other later shows in the genre. St. Elsewhere portrayed the medical profession as an admirable but less-than-perfect endeavor; the St. Eligius staff, while mostly having good intentions in serving their patients, all had their own personal and professional problems, with the two often intertwining. The staff's problems, and those of their patients (some of whom did not survive), were often contemporary in nature, with storylines involving breast cancer, AIDS, and addiction. Though the series dealt with serious issues of life, death, the medical profession, and the human effects of all three, a substantial number of comedic moments, inside jokes, and references to television history were included, as well as tender moments of humanity.

The producers for the series were Bruce Paltrow, Mark Tinker, John Masius, Tom Fontana, John Falsey and Abby Singer. Tinker, Masius, Fontana, and Paltrow wrote a number of episodes as well; other writers included John Tinker, John Ford Noonan, Charles H. Eglee, Eric Overmyer, Channing Gibson, and Aram Saroyan.

The cast of St. Elsewhere (season one)

The show's main and end title theme was composed by famed jazz musician and composer Dave Grusin. Noted film and TV composer J. A. C. Redford wrote the music for the series (except for the pilot, which was scored by Grusin). No soundtrack was ever released, but the theme was released in two different versions: the original TV mix and edit appeared on TVT Records' compilation Television's Greatest Hits, Vol. 3: 70s & 80s, and Grusin recorded a full-length version for inclusion on his Night Lines album, released in 1983.

== Main cast ==
Along with established actors Ed Flanders, Norman Lloyd and William Daniels, St. Elsewhere's ensemble cast included Ed Begley Jr., Stephen Furst, Bruce Greenwood, Mark Harmon, Howie Mandel, David Morse, Christina Pickles, Kyle Secor, Denzel Washington, and Alfre Woodard. Notable guest stars include Tim Robbins, whose first major role was in the series' first three episodes as domestic terrorist Andrew Reinhardt, and Doris Roberts and James Coco, who each earned Emmy Awards for their season-one appearance as a bag lady and her mentally challenged husband.

Actor	Character	Seasons					
Actor	Character	1	2	3	4	5	6
Starring
Ed Flanders	Dr. Donald Westphall	Main	Main	Main	Main	Main	Main
David Birney	Dr. Ben Samuels	Main					
Norman Lloyd	Dr. Daniel Auschlander	Recurring	Main	Main	Main	Main	Main
Ronny Cox	Dr. John Gideon						Main
William Daniels	Dr. Mark Craig	Main	Main	Main	Main	Main	Main
Also Starring
G. W. Bailey	Dr. Hugh Beale	Main					
Ed Begley Jr.	Dr. Victor Ehrlich	Main	Main	Main	Main	Main	Main
Terence Knox	Dr. Peter White	Main	Main	Main		Guest	
Howie Mandel	Dr. Wayne Fiscus	Main	Main	Main	Main	Main	Main
David Morse	Dr. Jack Morrison	Main	Main	Main	Main	Main	Main
Christina Pickles	Nurse Helen Rosenthal	Main	Main	Main	Main	Main	Main
Kavi Raz	Dr. Vijay Kochar	Main	Main	Recurring	Guest	Guest	Guest
Cynthia Sikes Yorkin	Dr. Annie Cavanero	Main	Main	Main			
Denzel Washington	Dr. Phillip Chandler	Main	Main	Main	Main	Main	Main
Ellen Bry	Nurse Shirley Daniels	Recurring	Main	Main		Guest	
Mark Harmon	Dr. Robert Caldwell		Main	Main	Main		
Eric Laneuville	Luther Hawkins	Recurring	Main	Main	Main	Main	Main
Kim Miyori	Dr. Wendy Armstrong	Recurring	Main				
Nancy Stafford	Joan Halloran		Main	Recurring	Guest		
Stephen Furst	Dr. Elliot Axelrod		Recurring	Main	Main	Main	Main
Bonnie Bartlett	Ellen Craig	Recurring	Recurring	Recurring	Recurring	Main	Main
Bruce Greenwood	Dr. Seth Griffin					Main	Main
Cindy Pickett	Dr. Carol Novino				Recurring	Main	Main
Sagan Lewis	Dr. Jacqueline Wade	Recurring	Recurring	Recurring	Recurring	Recurring	Main
France Nuyen	Dr. Paulette Kiem					Recurring	Main
Jennifer Savidge	Nurse Lucy Papandreo	Recurring	Recurring	Recurring	Recurring	Recurring	Main
Recurring
Barbara Whinnery	Dr. Cathy Martin	Recurring	Recurring	Recurring	Guest		
Byron Stewart	Warren Coolidge		Guest	Recurring	Recurring	Recurring	Recurring
Alfre Woodard	Dr. Roxanne Turner				Recurring	Recurring	Guest

== Episodes ==
Season	Episodes	Originally released	
Season	Episodes	First released	Last released
1	22	October 26, 1982	May 3, 1983
2	22	October 26, 1983	May 16, 1984
3	24	September 19, 1984	March 27, 1985
4	24	September 18, 1985	May 7, 1986
5	23	September 24, 1986	May 27, 1987
6	22	September 16, 1987	May 25, 1988

St. Elsewhere ran for six seasons and 137 episodes; the first season (1982–83) aired Tuesdays at 10 p.m. (ET), with remaining seasons airing Wednesdays at 10 p.m.

St. Elsewhere was noteworthy for featuring episodes with unusual aspects or significant changes to the series' status quo. Some of those episodes included:

=== "Qui Transtulit Sustinet" ===
Original air date: November 16, 1983

Dr. Morrison learns of the death of his wife, Nina (with whom he had an argument midway through the previous episode, which was the last time he saw her alive), after slipping and hitting her head. Nina's heart is donated to a heart transplant patient—a patient of Dr. Craig. The poignant final scene of the episode finds Morrison entering the patient's room and, with a stethoscope, hearing the patient's new heart—Nina's heart—steadily beating.

=== "Cheers" ===
Original air date: March 27, 1985

St. Elsewhere ended its 3rd season with this TV crossover that found Drs. Westphall, Auschlander, and Craig getting together at Cheers. The scene, which was filmed on the main Cheers soundstage (Stage 25 at the Paramount Studios lot), finds Cliff Clavin trying and failing to gain free medical advice from the doctors, Auschlander confronting his former accountant Norm Peterson, and barmaid Carla Tortelli voicing her displeasure with the doctors regarding her stay in St. Eligius two years earlier for the birth of her baby. The scene ends with Westphall announcing to his two colleagues that he has decided to leave St. Eligius and medicine, a short-lived departure, as he returned in the Season 4 premiere.

The merger of Cheers' and St. Elsewhere's universes created a discontinuity with the second season finale, "Hello, Goodbye", in which Dr. Morrison and his young son spend a day on the town and visit the real-world Bull and Finch Pub, the banners out front celebrating it as the inspiration for (and exterior view of) Cheers.

=== "Time Heals" ===
Original air date: February 19 and 20, 1986

This two-part episode featured storylines that fleshed out the 50-year history of St. Eligius, each sequence taped in a different style (i.e. black-and-white for the 1930s setting, muted colors for the 1940s). The storylines included the hospital's 1936 founding by Fr. Joseph McCabe (played by Edward Herrmann), the arrivals of Dr. Auschlander and Nurse Rosenthal, the early struggles of Mark Craig and his relationship with his mentor (which mirrored Craig's later mentoring of Dr. Ehrlich), the death of Dr. Westphall's wife, and Dr. Morrison simultaneously dealing with an overdose patient, a knee injury, and the disappearance of his son. TV Guide ranked "Time Heals" No. 44 on its 1997 list of "100 Greatest Episodes of All Time", calling the episode "a masterwork of dramatic writing."

=== "After Life" ===
Original air date: November 26, 1986

This episode deals with the shooting of Dr. Wayne Fiscus, who is critically wounded after being shot by the vengeful wife of a patient he is treating in the ER. As the staff frantically try to save him, Fiscus ventures back-and-forth between Hell (where he meets a former colleague, rapist Peter White), Purgatory, and Heaven, where he has a conversation with God, who presents Himself as a spitting image of Fiscus. Just as Fiscus shakes hands with Lou Gehrig, his colleagues successfully revive him.

=== "Last Dance at the Wrecker's Ball" ===
Original air date: May 27, 1987

In the season-five finale, all attempts to save St. Eligius from closing seem to have failed. As demolition begins, a frail Dr. Auschlander, accidentally left in the hospital after a relapse, attempts to escape.

=== "A Moon For the Misbegotten" ===
Original air date: September 30, 1987

St. Eligius is saved (and any damage from the above-mentioned "Wrecker's Ball" repaired), but it falls under the new ownership of Ecumena Corporation, a national managed health care concern. (The use of "Ecumena" garnered some real-life controversy, as Humana thought the use of that name sounded too much like its own. The trademark-infringement lawsuit that ensued prompted NBC to begin airing post-episode disclaimers stating that Ecumena was indeed fictional, and to change the corporate name mid-season to "Weigert".) Ecumena's choice to head St. Eligius, Dr. John Gideon, did not get along well with the St. Eligius staff, especially Dr. Westphall, who, in the final scene of this episode (and Ed Flanders's last moment as a St. Elsewhere series regular), delivers his resignation "in terms you can understand"—by dropping his pants and exposing his bare buttocks to Gideon ("You can kiss my ass, pal"). This scene, which would normally be considered controversial, was preserved by NBC's censors as they did not consider Westphall's display to be erotic in nature.

=== "Their Town" ===
Original air date: April 20, 1988

In a somewhat change-of-pace episode, Drs. Craig and Novino, Ellen Craig, and Lizzie Westphall visit Donald and Tommy Westphall (Lizzie's father and brother, respectively), who appear to be enjoying the quiet life in small town New Hampshire. The episode features Dr. Westphall occasionally breaking the fourth wall and speaking directly to the viewer, a la the "Stage Manager" character in Our Town (the episode title and its location are nods to the Thornton Wilder play). The teleplay for "Their Town" was written by St. Elsewhere cast member Sagan Lewis (as "S.J. Lewis"), although her character of Dr. Wade does not appear.

=== "The Last One" ===
Original air date: May 25, 1988

St. Elsewhere's series finale features momentous changes for several main characters, including the departures of Drs. Fiscus and Morrison and the death of Dr. Auschlander, as well as the return of Dr. Westphall to an active leadership role at St. Eligius after Weigert agrees to sell the hospital back to the Boston archdiocese, as Dr. Gideon is set to move on to another hospital in San Jose, California.

The finale is more known for its provocative final scene: Westphall and his son Tommy Westphall (played by Chad Allen), who has autism, are seen in Dr. Auschlander's office watching snow falling outside. The image cuts to an exterior shot of the hospital, shaking. At that moment, Tommy and Daniel Auschlander are seen in an apartment building, with Tommy sitting on the floor playing with a snow globe. A much younger-looking Donald arrives home from a day of work, and it is clear from the uniform he wears and the dialog in this scene that he works in construction. "Auschlander" is revealed to be Donald's father, and thus Tommy's grandfather. Donald laments to his father, "I don't understand this autism thing, Pop. Here's my son. I talk to him. I don't even know if he can hear me, because he sits there, all day long, in his own world, staring at that toy. What's he thinking about?" As Tommy shakes the snow globe, he is told by his father to come and wash his hands for dinner. Donald places the snow globe on the family's television set and walks into the kitchen with Tommy and Auschlander; as they leave the room, the camera closes in on the snow globe—which holds a replica of St. Eligius.

The most common interpretation of this scene is that the entire series of events in the series St. Elsewhere has been a product of Tommy Westphall's imagination, with elements of the above scene used as its own evidence. Author Cynthia Burkhead explains that with this final shot, "St. Elsewhere managed to take the idea of a dream and alter it just enough, putting it in the imagination of an autistic boy", and surmises that an ending constructed in this manner "reminds viewers that the fiction they have watched for six years is actually fiction within a fiction, occupying a second level of unreality, one level beyond the space of illusion filled by all narrative television." A notable result of this ending has been the attempt by individuals to determine how many television shows are also products of Tommy Westphall's mind owing to its shared fictional characters (the "Tommy Westphall Universe").

"The Last One"'s closing credits differ from those of the rest of the series. In all other episodes, the credits appear over a still image of an ongoing surgical operation, followed by the traditional MTM Productions black-backgrounded logo, featuring Mimsie the Cat in a cartoon surgical cap and mask. Here, the credits appear on a black background, flanked by an electrocardiogram and an IV bag, with Mimsie lying on her side at the top of the screen; at the end of the credits, the heart monitor flatlines, and Mimsie dies, thus ending St. Elsewhere for good. Coincidentally, Mimsie the Cat died in real life shortly after the airing of "The Last One" at the age of 20.

"The Last One" brought in 22.5 million viewers, ranking 7th out of 68 programs that week and attracting a 17.0/29 rating/share, and ranking as the most watched episode of the series. In 2011, the finale was ranked No. 12 on the TV Guide Network special TV's Most Unforgettable Finales.

== Broadcast history and Nielsen ratings ==
Season	Time slot (ET)	Rank	Rating
1982–83	Tuesdays 10 p.m.	#87	N/A
1983–84	Wednesdays 10 p.m.	#70	13.2
1984–85	Wednesdays 10 p.m.	#49	13.4
1985–86	Wednesdays 10 p.m.	#53	13.8
1986–87	Wednesdays 10 p.m.	#55	13.4
1987–88	Wednesdays 10 p.m.	#47	13.3

The ratings for St. Elsewhere's first season were so poor that NBC hesitated to renew the show and the crew understood it to be cancelled. After a ratings pop from the season finale, network CEO Grant Tinker (Mark's father and a co-founder of MTM) personally intervened to continue the show. However, it struggled for renewals throughout its run due to its below-average overall ratings/viewership.

== Allusions, crossovers, and homages ==
St. Elsewhere was known for the insertion of several allusions both large and small to classic movies, pop culture, and television events (the latter especially) throughout its run, including other shows that were produced by MTM Enterprises. Some of the more noteworthy allusions have included:

- The St. Eligius public address loudspeakers periodically summoned characters from other television series, often going unnoticed by the show's characters.
- The character of hospital orderly Warren Coolidge (played by Byron Stewart) was carried over from The White Shadow, where Coolidge had been a student at Carver High. (Before St. Elsewhere, Bruce Paltrow served as Shadow's showrunner.) Coolidge occasionally sported a Carver High T-shirt while working at St. Eligius. In third-season episode "Any Portrait in a Storm", Coolidge sees guest star Timothy Van Patten (another Shadow alumnus) in an elevator and calls out "Hey! Salami!," to which Van Patten, playing an unrelated character (named Dean, in a three episode story arc), replies "You got the wrong guy, pal," leaving Coolidge trying to plead his case with a confused "No – it's Warren," as the elevator doors close.
- In the third season episode "Saving Face", in which a character has the same condition as the main character in The Elephant Man, Dr. Westphall mentions that he has a meeting with Tony Clifton, "modifying the phone system and rewiring the whole hospital". Tony Clifton was one of several characters created by Andy Kaufman in his stage act. Later in the same episode Dr. Axelrod brings a ham to Mrs. Hufnagel after her husband, a vaudeville comedian, dies from an aneurysm in front of him while telling him a joke in the previous episode "Bye, George". Mrs. Hufnagel ends up in the emergency room after eating the ham as it was too much for her gallbladder. In vaudeville a ham was a bad comic or one could kill by "hamming it up".
- In the third season episode "Playing God, Part 2", the Craigs are in their bedroom and Mrs. Craig says she wants to see who is on The Merv Griffin Show. Dr. Craig says, "Probably some stupid comic." She turns on the TV and Howie Mandel, the actor/comedian who played Dr. Wayne Fiscus on the show, can be heard. Dr. Craig says, "What is he wearing, a hand?" (a reference to Mandel's routine that involved wearing a surgical glove on his head, or more likely his prop "handbag" which was shaped like a hand).
- The third season episode "Sweet Dreams" features a recreation of the music video for the ZZ Top song "Legs". It features the Eliminator car, but the band was played by members of the cast.
- The fourth season episode "Close Encounters" has numerous crossovers.
  - In the psychiatric ward, patients watch various MTM-produced shows on television – MTM (headed by Mary Tyler Moore and Grant Tinker) was the company that produced St. Elsewhere.
    - The patients briefly watch MTM's The White Shadow, produced by St. Elsewhere showrunner Bruce Paltrow. It is seen here as fictional, even though orderly Warren Coolidge is a carryover from The White Shadow (see above). (In the previous season, the bar from Cheers is seen as both fictional and part of the St. Elsewhere universe.)
  - The amnesiac patient John Doe #6, a recurring character played by Oliver Clark, while watching an episode of The Mary Tyler Moore Show on a hospital TV, believes himself to be that series' lead character Mary Richards. He then mistakes guest star Betty White, who had already appeared on the show in a straight role as a naval officer, for Sue Anne (the character White had played on that same show). She responds, "I'm afraid you've mistaken me for someone else."
  - John Doe #6 is verbally disparaged by another patient in the psychiatric ward — Elliott Carlin, the resident neurotic from The Bob Newhart Show played by Jack Riley. Carlin's treatment of Doe mirrored his behavior toward Oliver Clark's Bob Newhart Show character, Mr. Herd. Mr. Carlin subsequently appeared on an episode of Newhart, still uncured from the damage caused by "some quack in Chicago."
- In "Santa Claus Is Dead", Dr. Craig mentions serving in Korea with his drinking buddy, B. J. Hunnicutt, implying that Dr. Hunnicutt was reassigned to another unit in Korea following the July 1953 deactivation of the 4077th Mobile Army Surgical Hospital at the end of M*A*S*H's finale, "Goodbye, Farewell and Amen".
- The crew filled the series finale, "The Last One", with an abundance of allusions and homages. The cold open has Dr. Fiscus saying to an ER patient "General Sarnoff..." (the man responsible for launching NBC, the first television network, in 1926) "... cut down the time you spend in front of the television". There is a direct reference to the 1967 series finale of The Fugitive, when orderly Coolidge catches a "One-Armed Man", on a water tower, for "Dr. Kimble". A patient appears to get his hair cut by (The Andy Griffith Show's) Floyd the Barber, including his first name, face and clothing. There is a call over the public address system for a Code Blue (someone has reached their "end") in Room 222. There is a direct reference to the 1977 series finale of The Mary Tyler Moore Show, including a group hug, a group shuffle to get tissues and a suggestion that they sing "It's a Long Way to Tipperary". The finale for the character Dr. Henry Blake in a 1975 episode of M*A*S*H is referred to when cadaver "4077" is autopsied after a "helicopter crash". There are numerous song references, including Dr. Fiscus saying "It's the end of the world as we know it, and I feel fine", and Dr. Auschlander exclaiming "Jumpin' Jack, what was that flash?"

St. Elsewhere was also host to one crossover, served as the source material for two others, and has been paid homage to in several ways:

- The third season's finale featured Drs. Westphall, Auschlander, and Craig visiting the eponymous pub of Cheers (also set in Boston) for a drink. During the second season of Cheers, barmaid Carla Tortelli (Rhea Perlman) gave birth to a child at St. Eligius, and here expresses her displeasure about her hospitalization there, even getting into a verbal altercation with Dr. Craig.
- Two St. Elsewhere characters were carried over to the NBC series Homicide: Life on the Street, which was executive produced by St. Elsewhere alumnus Tom Fontana. In an episode in season six entitled "Mercy", Alfre Woodard reprises her role of Dr. Roxanne Turner, who is accused of illegally euthanizing a cancer patient. Woodard was nominated for an Emmy Award as Outstanding Guest Actress in a Drama Series for her performance. In other Homicide episodes, the character of Detective Tim Bayliss (played by Kyle Secor) develops a bad back and is treated by an offscreen "Dr. Ehrlich". In the Homicide: The Movie finale, Ed Begley Jr., makes an uncredited appearance as Dr. Victor Ehrlich.
- Ed Begley Jr., William Daniels, Stephen Furst, and Eric Laneuville reunited to appear in a season-one episode of Scrubs where the actors, rather than reprising their St. Elsewhere roles, play a quartet of doctors that fall sick at a medical convention. The episode was part of a week-long series of events honoring NBC's 75th Anniversary.
- Episode 7 ("There Are No F**king Sides") of Season 1 of Showtime's series City on a Hill (based in early 1990s Boston) includes an establishing shot of the exterior of St. Eligius, along with hospital scenes in which Dr. Morrison is referenced by a character, and in which Drs. Axelrod, Wade, Westphall, and Fiscus and Nurse Papandreau are paged in the background on the hospital's PA system. In S01E08, St. Eligius was mentioned by name.
- In Oz, the company Weigert (which played a major role in St. Elsewhere's final season) takes over the prison's medical ward after the company makes a deal with Governor Devlin in Season 3. During the final season, nurse and angel of mercy serial killer is mentioned as having been fired from numerous hospitals prior to joining Oz's medical staff, including St. Elsewhere.
- In the 2023 Rock N Roll Biographies comic book on King Diamond from Ten Ton Press, the ending is a direct homage to the final episode which writer Spike Steffenhagen has called "The greatest ending to any television show." The final panel features a couple looking at their two black cats (who have appeared as giants throughout the story) staring into a snow globe with a haunted house in it.

== Awards and nominations ==
St. Elsewhere won 24 out of 106 award nominations. The series garnered 62 Primetime Emmy Award nominations, winning 13 of them. Out of the thirteen wins, Ed Flanders won once and William Daniels won twice for Outstanding Lead Actor in a Drama Series, Bonnie Bartlett and Doris Roberts each won for Outstanding Supporting Actress in a Drama Series, James Coco won for Outstanding Supporting Actor in a Drama Series, John Masius and Tom Fontana won two awards for Outstanding Writing for a Drama Series, and Mark Tinker won for Outstanding Directing for a Drama Series. It received five Golden Globe Award nominations, with four of them for Best Television Series – Drama. St. Elsewhere received seven TCA Award nominations, winning once for Outstanding Achievement in Drama. The series also won three out of four Q Awards. Additional accolades include a Peabody Award and People's Choice Award for Favorite New TV Dramatic Program.

== Film adaptation ==
In May 2003, Walden Media announced a partnership with Roth Films to create a film adaptation of the television series. It was never made.

== Syndication ==
After its initial run, reruns of St. Elsewhere aired for a time in syndication, with later runs on Nick at Nite, TV Land, Bravo and AmericanLife TV Network.

Also a popular series in the United Kingdom, St. Elsewhere has been aired twice by two separate British broadcasters. Channel 4 aired the series between 1983 and 1989, with Sky One later airing repeats in a daily Midday timeslot during 1992–93. In 2009, Channel 4 began showing the series again, usually at around 3:30 a.m., and have repeated the entire series several times since then. All 137 episodes are also available to view online at All 4.

Nick at Nite first added St. Elsewhere to its regular lineup on April 29, 1996, as part of an all-night sneak peek of sister network TV Land. After the sneak peek, Nick at Nite aired St. Elsewhere regularly from May 4 until July 6, 1996, every Saturday night as part of a short-lived programming block called Nick at Nite's TV Land Sampler. St. Elsewhere was one of many rotating shows airing Saturday nights as part of Nick at Nite's TV Land Sampler, which included (among other shows) Petticoat Junction, That Girl and The Sonny & Cher Comedy Hour along with past Nick at Nite Classics Mister Ed and Green Acres. Nick at Nite aired reruns of St. Elsewhere once again from June 30 until July 4, 1997, as part of the week-long event The 100 Greatest Episodes of All Time.

== Home media ==
On November 28, 2006, 20th Century Fox Home Entertainment released the complete first season of St. Elsewhere on DVD in Region 1.

In Region 2, Channel 4 DVD released the first season on DVD in the UK on April 2, 2007. All episodes have been made available on Channel 4's UK on-demand internet stream All 4 in the UK and Ireland, though these episodes are edited versions for syndication and not as they were originally aired.

Beginning October 2018, all episodes were available for streaming on Hulu. On November 1, 2023, several episodes were removed from the series. Though no official statement from Hulu was provided as to why they were removed, customers who have contacted their customer support have been told streaming rights issues are the reason. The following episodes were missing from Hulu:

- Season 1, Episode 8 "Tweety and Ralph"
- Season 1, Episode 15 "Monday, Tuesday, Sven's Day"
- Season 1, Episode 22 "Addiction"
- Season 2, Episode 3 "Newheart"
- Season 2, Episode 6 "Under Pressure"
- Season 2, Episode 13 "In Sickness and in Health"
- Season 2, Episode 17 "Vanity"
- Season 3, Episode 8 "Sweet Dreams"
- Season 4, Episode 3 "Haunted"
- Season 4, Episode 7 "Close Encounters"
- Season 4, Episode 10 "Loss of Power"
- Season 4, Episode 13 "To Tell the Truth"
- Season 4, Episode 19 "Out on a Limb"
- Season 5, Episode 6 "Not My Type"
- Season 5, Episode 11 "Lost Weekend"
- Season 5, Episode 16 "Jose, Can You See?"
- Season 6, Episode 6 "The He-Man Woman Hater's Club"
- Season 6, Episode 9 "Weigh In, Way Out"
- Season 6, Episode 12 "Final Cut"
- Season 6, Episode 20 "Split Decision"
- Season 6, Episode 21 "The Abby Singer Show"

As of October 1, 2025, all episodes of St. Elsewhere have been removed from Hulu due to loss of streaming rights.
