= John Tinker (TV producer) =

American television producer and writer

John Tinker is an American television producer and writer. He is the co-creator of the CBS drama Judging Amy and has been an executive producer and writer on American television shows including NBC's St. Elsewhere, the CBS drama Chicago Hope, the ABC drama The Practice, and the NBC drama The Book of Daniel. He developed the television series Chesapeake Shores for the Hallmark Channel and was the executive producer and co-writer on the Hallmark Hall of Fame movie Love Locks. He was the showrunner/writer/executive producer of When Calls the Heart for its eighth and ninth seasons.

Tinker won the 1986 Emmy Award for Outstanding Writing in a Drama Series for the St. Elsewhere episode "Time Heals", which he co-wrote with Tom Fontana and John Masius. He has received numerous Emmy Award nominations and Humanitas Prize nominations.

He is the son of television executive Grant Tinker and his first wife, Ruth Byerly, as well as the father of actor Zach Tinker. Tinker is married to author and columnist Ronda Rich.
