= Kim Miyori =

American actress

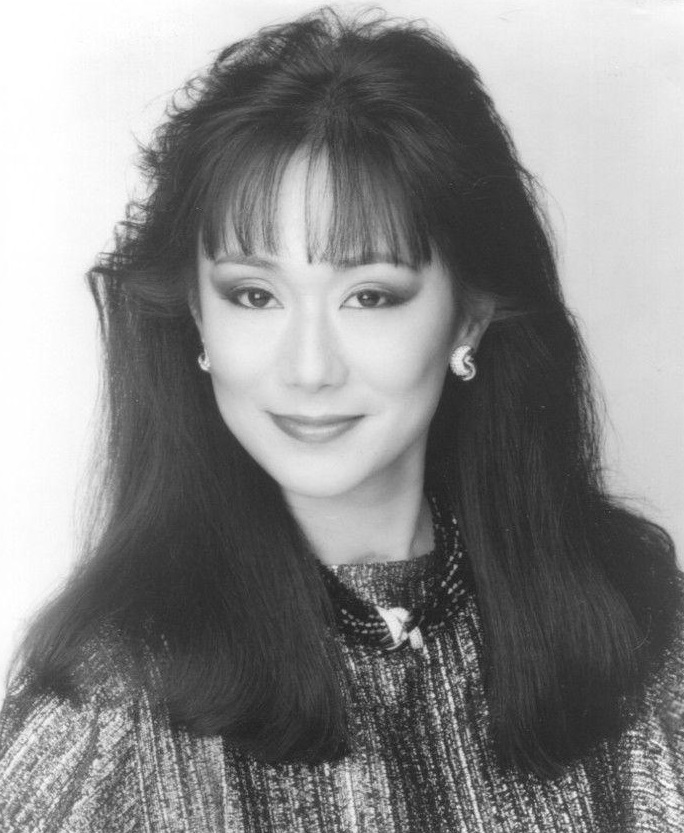
- Miyori in 1984
- Years active: 1976–present

Kim Miyori is an American actress, best known for the role of Dr. Wendy Armstrong, a beleaguered resident, on the first two seasons (1982–1984) of the medical drama St. Elsewhere.

Miyori has also appeared in the TV shows Babylon 5; Murder, She Wrote; Magnum, P.I.; JAG and 24.

== Filmography ==
- 2007 Cold Case (TV) as Evelyn Takahashi
- 2006 The Grudge 2 as Kayako's Mother
- 2005 Ghost Whisperer (TV) as Dr. Keiko Tanaka
- 2004 JAG (TV) as Internist / Commander Shelley Purcell
- 1999 My American Vacation as Ming Yee
- 1997 Metro as Inspector Eiko Kimura
- 1996 Babylon 5 (TV) as Captain Sandra Hiroshi
- 1996 Hijacked: Flight 285 (TV) as Stewardess Barbara
- 1995 Solar Eclipse (VG) as Susan Powell
- 1994 Shadow of Obsession (TV) as Angela
- 1993 Journey to the Center of the Earth (TV) as Dr. Tesue Ishikawa
- 1993 Body Shot as Christine Wyler
- 1991 Fire! Trapped on the 37th Floor (TV) as Willa Reeves
- 1990 Hiroshima: Out of the Ashes (TV) as Mrs. Ota
- 1989 The Punisher as Lady Ideko Tanaka
- 1989 The Big Picture as Jenny Sumner
- 1989 Loverboy as Kyoko Bruckner
- 1987 Island Sons (TV) as Diane Ishimura
- 1987 Murder, She Wrote: "Steal Me a Story" (TV) as Gayle Yamada
- 1986 When the Bough Breaks (TV) as Kim Hickle
- 1986 T. J. Hooker: "Blood Sport" (TV) as Barbara Grayle
- 1986 Super Password (January 27–31, 1986) as Celebrity Guest
- 1985 John and Yoko: A Love Story (TV) as Yoko Ono
- 1985 Generation (TV) as Teri Tanaka
- 1984 Murder 101 (TV) as Kia Nadao
- 1984 Match Game-Hollywood Squares Hour (March 26–30, 1984) as Celebrity Guest
- 1984 The $25,000 Pyramid (February 27 – March 2, 1984) as Celebrity Guest
- 1983 Antony and Cleopatra (TV) as Iras
- 1982 Magnum P.I. (TV series) (October 14, 1982) as Asani Osawa
- 1982 St. Elsewhere (TV series) (1982-1984) as Dr. Wendy Armstrong
- 1981 Zoot Suit (also appeared in the same role in the 1979 Broadway production of the play) as Manchaka
- 1978 Sgt. Pepper's Lonely Hearts Club Band as Dancer
