= John Ford Noonan =

American dramatist

- Born: John Ford Noonan Jr. October 7, 1943; Connecticut
- Died: December 16, 2018 (aged 75); Englewood, New Jersey
- Education: Brown University; Carnegie Institute of Technology
- Occupations: Actor; playwright; screenwriter
- Notable work: A Coupla White Chicks Sitting Around Talking
- Children: 4
- Relatives: Tom Noonan (brother)
- Awards: Primetime Emmy Award for Outstanding Writing for a Drama Series

John Ford Noonan Jr. (October 7, 1943 – December 16, 2018) was an American actor, playwright, and screenwriter. He is best known for his Off-Broadway hit two-hander comedy A Coupla White Chicks Sitting Around Talking. Noonan's first major production was the 1969 play The Year Boston Won the Pennant; he continued writing throughout the 1970s, '80s, and '90s, completing more than 30 plays in total.

Noonan wrote occasionally for television in the 1980s. He shared the 1984 Emmy Award for Outstanding Writing for a Drama Series with Tom Fontana and John Masius for an episode of the show St. Elsewhere; he received a second Emmy nomination in 1985 for his TV adaptation of his play Men Need Help.

== Early life ==
Noonan was born in Connecticut to Rita née McGannon, a mathematics teacher, and John Noonan Sr., a jazz musician and doctor of dental surgery. Noonan's place of birth has been variously reported as Stamford and Greenwich.

He received a Bachelor of Arts degree from Brown University in 1964 and a Master of Arts in theater arts from the Carnegie Institute of Technology in 1966. After graduating, Noonan briefly taught Latin, English, and history at a high school in Long Island.

== Author ==
In 1969, Noonan's highly acclaimed Lincoln Center Theater production, The Year Boston Won the Pennant, won an Obie Award, and garnered a Theatre World Award nomination and a Pulitzer Prize nomination. In the 1970s several of his plays were produced by Joseph Papp at The Public Theater, including Older People, which won a Drama Desk Award; Rainbows For Sale, which won an Obie Award; Where Do We Go From Here?; Getting Through The Night and All the Sad Protestants. The Club Champion’s Widow, starring Maureen Stapleton, was produced at the Robert Lewis Acting Company. A Coupla White Chicks Sitting Around Talking was produced at the Astor Place Theatre in New York, it starred Susan Sarandon and Eileen Brennan and ran for more than 800 performances. His play, Some Men Need Help, was originally produced in New York City at the 47th Street Theatre; it starred Philip Bosco and Treat Williams.

Stay Away a Little Closer, starring the author's daughter, Jesse Sage Noonan, and When It Comes Early, starring Harris Yulin and Kathleen Chalfant, were both produced at the Ensemble Studio Theatre in New York City.

Noonan wrote over 35 plays and was inducted into the French Society of Composers and Authors in 1989.

He wrote for TV's Comedy Zone in the early 1980s and St. Elsewhere, the latter for which he shared a win for the 1984 Emmy Award for Outstanding Writing for a Drama Series. for the episode "The Women". His second Emmy nomination was for his TV adaptation of his play Some Men Need Help.

== Actor ==
As an actor, he appeared on stage, notably in 1990 at the Actors’ Playhouse in New York, when he appeared in his own play, Talking Things Over with Chekhov, in which he played a playwright who comes home one night to find Anton Chekhov sitting in his rocking chair. He also appeared in a number of films, including Uncle Freddy (2008), My Divorce (1997), Flirting with Disaster (1996), Adventures in Babysitting (1987), Forty Deuce (1982), Next Stop, Greenwich Village (1976), and Septuagenarian Substitute Ball (1970).

In the film God Has a Rap Sheet (2003), Noonan played the title character, God, who has taken on the persona of a former literature professor. He also appeared in the TV series Bay State (1991).

== Personal life and death ==
Noonan was married to Marcia Lunt, whom he divorced in 1968. He had one child with Lynn Cohen, who he was with in the late ‘70s. He had three children - a son (Chris Howell) and two daughters (Tracy Howell and Jesse Sage Noonan).

He died at the Lillian Booth Actors Home in Englewood, New Jersey on December 16, 2018, at the age of 77 from heart failure.

== Plays ==
- All She Cares About Is The Yankees (1988)
- All the Sad Protestants
- The Club Champion's Widow (1978)
- Concerning The Effects Of Trimethylchloride (1971)
- A Coupla White Chicks Sitting Around Talking (1979)
- A Critic And His Wife (1997)
- Drowning Of Manhattan (1992)
- The Effects of Trimethylchloride (1972)
- Getting Through The Night (1976)
- Good-By And Keep Cold (1973)
- Green Mountain (1987)
- Heterosexual Temperature In West Hollywood (1987)
- Lazarus Was A Lady (1970)
- Linger
- Listen To The Lions (1979)
- Mom Sells Twins For Two Beers (1987)
- Monday Night Varieties (1972)
- Music From Down the Hill (1993)
- My Daddy's Serious American Gift (1989)
- A Noonan Night (1973)
- Nothing But Bukowski (1987)
- Older People (1972)
- Pick Pack Pock Puck (1974)
- Rainbows For Sale (1971)
- Raunchy Dame In The Chines Raincoat (1987)
- Recent Developments In Southern Connecticut (1990)
- Sneaky Bit To Raise The Blind (1974)
- Some Men Need Help (1982)
- Spanish Confusion (1987)
- Stay Away A Little Closer (1990)
- Talking Things Over With Chekhov (1987)
- What Drove Me Back To Reconsidering My Father (1988)
- When It Comes Early (1995)
- Where Do We Go From Here? (1974)
- Why Can't You Be Him? (1987)
- The Year Boston Won The Pennant (1969)
