= John Masius =

American writer (1950–2025)

- Born: John William Masius; July 30, 1950; New York City, U.S.
- Died: September 13, 2025 (aged 75); Los Angeles, California, U.S.
- Education: University of Pennsylvania; UCLA
- Occupations: Writer; television producer
- Years active: 1975–2011
- Spouse: Ellen Bry (m. 1986; div. 1999)
- Children: 3

John William Masius (July 30, 1950 – September 13, 2025) was an American screenwriter. He was credited with creating the series Touched by an Angel (1994–2003), Providence (1999–2002) and Hawthorne (2009–2011).

== Life and career ==
Masius was born in Manhattan, New York City on July 30, 1950, and grew up in Scarsdale, New York. He graduated from Scarsdale High School.

He earned a bachelor's degree in economics from the Wharton School of the University of Pennsylvania and an MBA from the University of California, Los Angeles (UCLA).

In 1986, Masius married actress Ellen Bry, who was a series regular on St. Elsewhere. They divorced in 1999. They had three children: son Max, daughter Hannah and son Sam.

Masius died from complications of ALS at his home in Los Angeles on September 13, 2025, at the age of 75.

== Awards and nominations ==
Masius won two writing Emmy Awards for the drama St. Elsewhere. He also received a Writers Guild award and the Humanitas Prize for his writing on St. Elsewhere.

Masius also received The Humanitas Prize for the series Brooklyn Bridge.

== Filmography ==
=== Film ===
| Year | Title | Contribution | | Notes |
| Year | Title | Producer | Writer | Notes |
|---|---|---|---|---|
| 1975 | Las Vegas Lady | Yes | No | Production Assistant |
| 1976 | Bittersweet Love | Yes | No | Production Assistant |
| 1976 | Tracks | Yes | No | Production Assistant |
| 2009 | Dead like Me: Life After Death | No | Yes | Writer; Direct-to-Video |

=== Television ===
| Year | Title | Contribution | | | Notes |
| Year | Title | Creator | Writer | Producer | Notes |
|---|---|---|---|---|---|
| 1979–1981 | The White Shadow | No | Yes | Yes | Story Consultant for 7 episodes Writer of 3 episodes Coordinating Producer of 12 episodes Production Assistant for 2 episodes Production Associate Episode: "On the Line" |
| 1982–1987 | St. Elsewhere | Yes | Yes | Yes | Creator of 137 episodes Writer of 26 episodes Story by of 59 episodes Teleplay by of 7 episodes Producer of 54 episodes |
| 1988–1989 | Tattingers's | Yes | Yes | No | Creator of 13 episodes Writer of Episode: "Pilot" |
| 1989 | Dolphin Cove | No | No | Yes | Executive Producer of Episode: "Two Shots and a Splash" |
| 1990 | Ferris Bueller | Yes | Yes | Yes | Creator of 11 episodes Writer of 2 episodes Executive Producer of 2 episodes |
| 1991–1992 | Brooklyn Bridge | No | Yes | No | 3 episodes |
| 1992–1993 | L.A. Law | No | Yes | Yes | Writer of 3 episodes Co-Executive Producer of 14 episodes |
| 1994–2003 | Touched by an Angel | Yes | No | No | Creator of 211 episodes |
| 1995–1997 | The Single Guy | Yes | Yes | No | Creative Consultant for 14 episodes Writer of Episode: "Starting Over" |
| 1997–1998 | The Visitor | No | Yes | Yes | Writer of Episode: "Fear of Flying"; Executive Producer of 13 episodes |
| 1999–2002 | Providence | Yes | Yes | Yes | Creator of 96 episodes Writer of 3 episodes Executive Producer of 62 episodes |
| 2001 | Chestnut Hill | No | No | Yes | Television Movie |
| 2003–2004 | Dead Like Me | No | Yes | Yes | Writer of 3 episodes Executive Producer of 28 episodes |
| 2009–2011 | Hawthorne | Yes | Yes | Yes | Creator of 30 episodes Executive Consultant of 3 episodes Writer of 4 episodes Executive Producer of 23 episodes |

== Awards and nominations ==
| Year | Title | Accolade | Category | Results | Ref |
|---|---|---|---|---|---|
| 1981 | The White Shadow | Primetime Emmy Award | Outstanding Drama Series | Nominated | |
| 1983 | St. Elsewhere | Primetime Emmy Award | Outstanding Drama Series | Nominated | |
| 1984 | St. Elsewhere | Humanitas Prize Award | 60 Minute Category for episode ("Ties That Bind") | Nominated | |
| 1984 | St. Elsewhere | Humanitas Prize Award | 60 Minute Category for episode ("All About Eve") | Nominated | |
| 1984 | St. Elsewhere | Primetime Emmy Award | Outstanding Drama Series | Nominated | |
| 1984 | St. Elsewhere | Primetime Emmy Award | Outstanding Writing in a Drama Series for episode ("The Women") | Won | |
| 1984 | St. Elsewhere | Primetime Emmy Award | Outstanding Writing in a Drama Series for episode ("All About Eve") | Nominated | |
| 1984 | St. Elsewhere | Primetime Emmy Award | Outstanding Writing in a Drama Series for episode ("Newheart") | Nominated | |
| 1984 | St. Elsewhere | Writers Guild Award | Episodic Drama for episode ("Addiction") | Nominated | |
| 1985 | St. Elsewhere | Humanitas Prize Award | 60 Minute Category (shared with Tom Fontana) | Won | |
| 1985 | St. Elsewhere | Primetime Emmy Award | Outstanding Drama Series | Nominated | |
| 1985 | St. Elsewhere | Primetime Emmy Award | Outstanding Writing in a Drama Series for episode ("Sweet Dreams") | Nominated | |
| 1985 | St. Elsewhere | Primetime Emmy Award | Outstanding Writing in a Drama Series for episode ("Murder, She Rote") | Nominated | |
| 1985 | St. Elsewhere | Writers Guild Award | Episodic Drama for episode ("Hello, Goodbye") | Nominated | |
| 1985 | St. Elsewhere | Writers Guild Award | Episodic Drama for episode ("The Women") | Nominated | |
| 1986 | St. Elsewhere | Humanitas Prize Award | 60 Minute Category for episode ("Sanctuary") | Nominated | |
| 1986 | St. Elsewhere | Primetime Emmy Award | Outstanding Drama Series | Nominated | |
| 1986 | St. Elsewhere | Primetime Emmy Award | Outstanding Writing in a Drama Series for episode ("Haunted") | Nominated | |
| 1986 | St. Elsewhere | Primetime Emmy Award | Outstanding Writing in a Drama Series for episode ("Time Heals") | Won | |
| 1986 | St. Elsewhere | Writers Guild Award | Episodic Drama for episode ("Sweet Dreams") | Nominated | |
| 1987 | St. Elsewhere | Humanitas Prize Award | 60 Minute Category for episode ("A Room with a View") | Nominated | |
| 1987 | St. Elsewhere | Humanitas Prize Award | 60 Minute Category for episode ("Where There's Hope, There's Crosby") | Nominated | |
| 1987 | St. Elsewhere | Primetime Emmy Award | Outstanding Drama Series | Nominated | |
| 1987 | St. Elsewhere | Primetime Emmy Award | Outstanding Writing in a Drama Series for episode ("Afterlife") | Nominated | |
| 1987 | St. Elsewhere | Writers Guild Award | Episodic Drama for episode ("Remembrance of Things Past") | Won | |
| 1988 | St. Elsewhere | Writers Guild Award | Episodic Drama for episode ("A Room with a View") | Nominated | |
| 1992 | Brooklyn Bridge | Humanitas Prize Award | 30 Minute Network or Syndicated Television | Won | |
