= Ellen Bry =

American actress

- Bry in CHiPs, 1979
- Occupations: Film, television actress
- Years active: 1976–present
- Known for: St. Elsewhere; The Amazing Spider-Man; The Quality of Life

Ellen Bry is an American actress. She is best known for her portrayal of nurse-turned-vigilante Shirley Daniels on the hospital drama St. Elsewhere.

Bry gained acting experience in school plays, community theater productions, Tufts University and summer stock theatre. At one point, she left acting and worked as a paralegal for New York City's Department of Consumer Affairs. A scripted fight on an episode of Kojak led to Bry's working for a while as a stuntwoman in New York.

Bry also appeared as medical student Jean Hallinan in three episodes of the television series Dallas (Season Four, 1981) and as photographer Julie Masters on the 1978 CBS series The Amazing Spider-Man.

Bry's family moved to Stamford, Connecticut, when she was a child.

== Filmography ==
Year	Title	Role	Notes
1976	To Fly!	Herself	Documentary short
1978	Superman		Stunts, Uncredited
1979	Dallas Cowboys Cheerleaders	Joanne Vail	TV movie
1979	CHiPs	Beth	Episode: "High Octane"
1978–1979	The Amazing Spider-Man	Julie Masters	8 episodes
1980	Quincy, M.E.	Linda Hayes	Episode: "The Final Gift"
1982–1987	St. Elsewhere	Nurse Shirley Daniels	52 episodes
1983	Starflight: The Plane That Couldn't Land	Laura	TV movie
1984	Battle of the Network Stars XVI	Self - NBC Team	TV special
1986	MacGyver	Carole Tanner	Episode: "Countdown"
1986	Disneyland	Karen McCorder	Episode: "I-Man"
1986	The Love Boat	Gretchen Sommers	Episode: "Miss Mom/Who's the Champ/Gopher's Delusion"
1987	Murder, She Wrote	Linda Stevens	Episode: "The Cemetery Vote"
1992	Star Trek: The Next Generation	Dr. Farallon	Episode: "The Quality of Life"
1994	Renegade	Waitress	Episode: "Charlie"
1994	Mrs. Greer	Katherine	Short
1995	Bye Bye Love	Debbie	
1998	Deep Impact	Stofsky	
1999	Emergency Room 2	Nurse Ann Noyance	Video Game
2000	Highway 395		
2006	Mission: Impossible III	Lindsey's Mother	
2009	The Lost & Found Family	Ester	
