= Bruce Paltrow =

American director and producer (1943–2002)

- Born: Bruce Weigert Paltrow; November 26, 1943; New York City, New York, U.S.
- Died: October 3, 2002 (aged 58); Rome, Italy
- Occupations: Film director, producer
- Spouse: Blythe Danner (m. 1969)
- Children: Gwyneth; Jake
- Relatives: Gabby Giffords (first cousin once removed)

Bruce Weigert Paltrow (November 26, 1943 – October 3, 2002) was an American television and film director and producer. He was the husband of actress Blythe Danner, and the father of actress Gwyneth Paltrow and screenwriter/director Jake Paltrow.

== Life and career ==
Paltrow was born in Brooklyn, the son of Dorothy (née Weigert) and Arnold "Buster" Paltrow (né Paltrowitz). He had a brother, Robert. He was a first cousin of Spencer J. Giffords, father of Gabby Giffords, who became an American politician and member of the United States House of Representatives. His family was of Eastern European Jewish descent with roots in Minsk. His paternal great-grandfather, whose surname was Paltrowicz, was a Rabbi in Nowogród. His father and mother owned Paltrow Steel Company and a home in Palm Beach, Florida and he was raised in Great Neck, New York.

Paltrow studied painting at Tulane University in New Orleans, Louisiana. In the late 1960s, he began directing stage productions in New York City, where he met actress Blythe Danner. They were married from December 14, 1969, until his death.

He was the producer of the television series The White Shadow and St. Elsewhere. His last production was the film Duets, which starred his daughter Gwyneth.

He also owned a restaurant in Aspen called Gordon's.

Paltrow identified himself as a Democrat. He reportedly refused to cast Dwight Schultz for a role on St. Elsewhere because the actor, a political conservative, supported Ronald Reagan.

== Death and legacy ==
Paltrow died on October 3, 2002, aged 58, while vacationing in Rome, Italy, to celebrate his daughter's 30th birthday. He had been diagnosed with oral cancer in 1999; his death was due to complications from oral cancer and pneumonia.

In 2007, his widow Blythe Danner, in co-operation with The Oral Cancer Foundation, set up a fund in his name to address oral cancer issues in the United States. The foundation works primarily in the areas of public awareness, early detection, patient support functions and research.

In 2002, three weeks after Paltrow's death, his daughter Gwyneth met Coldplay singer Chris Martin, whom she married in 2003. The 2005 Coldplay album X&Y carried a dedication to Bruce Paltrow, and the song "Fix You" was written to help Gwyneth through her grief.

== Filmography ==
Year	Title	Role	Notes
1978-1980	The White Shadow	Writer (54 episodes), director (8 episodes), executive producer (54 episodes)	Television series
1980	Paris	Director (1 episode)	Television series
1982	A Little Sex	Director and producer	Film
1983–1987	St. Elsewhere	Writer (3 episodes), director (14 episodes), executive producer (130 episodes)	Television series
1988	Tattinger's	Writer (14 episodes), director (2 episodes), and executive producer (9 episodes)	Television series
1992	Home Fires	Writer (6 episodes) and director (3 episodes)	Television series
1993	Homicide: Life on the Street	Director (1 episode)	Television series
1994	The Road Home	Director (1 episode)	Television series
1995	Ed McBain's 87th Precinct: Lightning	Director	Television movie
2000	Duets	Director and producer	Film
2001–2002	The Mind of the Married Man	Director (2 episodes)	Television series
2003	Fargo	Writer and executive producer	Television pilot; never aired
