= Primetime Emmy Award for Outstanding Writing for a Limited or Anthology Series or Movie =

Award

- Awarded for: Outstanding Writing for a Limited or Anthology Series or Movie
- Country: United States
- Presented by: Academy of Television Arts & Sciences
- First award: 1971
- Currently held by: Steven Conrad, DTF St. Louis (2026)
- Website: emmys.com

This is a list of the winners and nominees of the Primetime Emmy Award for Outstanding Writing for a Limited or Anthology Series or Movie.

== Winners and nominations ==
indicates the winner

=== 1970s ===
Year	Program	Episode	Nominee(s)	Network
1971 (23rd)
1971 (23rd)	Outstanding Writing in Drama — Adaptation			
1971 (23rd)	Hollywood Television Theater	"The Andersonville Trial"	Saul Levitt	PBS
1971 (23rd)	Hallmark Hall of Fame	"Hamlet"	John Barton	NBC
1971 (23rd)	World Premiere NBC Monday & Tuesday Night Movie	"Vanished"	Dean Riesner	NBC
1971 (23rd)	Outstanding Writing in Drama — Original			
1971 (23rd)	Movie of the Week on ABC	"Tribes"	Marvin Schwarz and Tracy Keenan Wynn	ABC
1971 (23rd)	CBS Thursday Night Movie	"The Brotherhood of the Bell"	David Karp	CBS
1971 (23rd)	World Premiere Movie	"San Francisco International Airport"	Allan Balter and William Read Woodfield	NBC
1972 (24th)
1972 (24th)	Outstanding Writing in Drama — Adaptation			
1972 (24th)	Movie of the Week	"Brian's Song"	William Blinn	ABC
1972 (24th)	Hallmark Hall of Fame	"The Snow Goose"	Paul W. Gallico	CBS
1972 (24th)	The Homecoming: A Christmas Story		Earl Hamner Jr.	CBS
1972 (24th)	The New CBS Friday Night Movies	"The Glass House"	Tracy Keenan Wynn	CBS
1972 (24th)	Outstanding Writing in Drama — Original			
1972 (24th)	To All My Friends on Shore		Allan Sloane	CBS
1972 (24th)	Movie of the Weekend	"Thief"	John D. F. Black	ABC
1972 (24th)	The New CBS Friday Night Movies	"Goodbye, Raggedy Ann"	Jack Sher	CBS
1973 (25th)
1973 (25th)	Outstanding Writing in Drama — Adaptation			
1973 (25th)	The House Without a Christmas Tree		Eleanor Perry	CBS
1973 (25th)	Bell System Family Theatre	"The Red Pony"	Ron Bishop and Robert Totten	NBC
1973 (25th)	Wednesday Movie of the Week	"Go Ask Alice"	Ellen M. Violett	ABC
1973 (25th)	Outstanding Writing in Drama — Original			
1973 (25th)	CBS Thursday Night Movie	"The Marcus-Nelson Murders"	Abby Mann	CBS
1973 (25th)	The New CBS Tuesday Night Movies	"Hawkins on Murder"	David Karp	CBS
1973 (25th)	Wednesday Movie of the Week	"That Certain Summer"	Richard Levinson and William Link	ABC
1974 (26th)
1974 (26th)	Best Writing in Drama — Adaptation			
1974 (26th)	The Autobiography of Miss Jane Pittman		Tracy Keenan Wynn	CBS
1974 (26th)	Hollywood Television Theatre	"Steambath"	Bruce Jay Friedman	PBS
1974 (26th)	NBC Wednesday Night Movie	"The Execution of Private Slovik"	Richard Levinson and William Link	NBC
1974 (26th)	Best Writing in Drama — Original			
1974 (26th)	GE Theater	"Tell Me Where It Hurts"	Fay Kanin	CBS
1974 (26th)	CBS Playhouse 90	"The Migrants"	Lanford Wilson	CBS
1974 (26th)	The New CBS Tuesday Night Movies	"Cry Rape!"	Will Lorin	CBS
1975 (27th)
1975 (27th)	Outstanding Writing in a Special Program – Drama or Comedy (Adaptation)			
1975 (27th)	IBM Presents Clarence Darrow		David W. Rintels	NBC
1975 (27th)	ABC Movie Special	"QB VII"	Edward Anhalt	ABC
1975 (27th)	Outstanding Writing in a Special Program – Drama or Comedy (Original)			
1975 (27th)	ABC Theater	"Love Among the Ruins"	James Costigan	ABC
1975 (27th)	ABC Theater	"The Missiles of October"	Stanley R. Greenberg	ABC
1975 (27th)	NBC World Premiere Movie	"The Law"	Joel Oliansky and William Sackheim	NBC
1975 (27th)	Queen of the Stardust Ballroom		Jerome Kass	CBS
1975 (27th)	Special World Premiere ABC Saturday Night Movie	"Hustling"	Fay Kanin	ABC
1976 (28th)	Outstanding Writing in a Special Program – Drama or Comedy (Adaptation)			
1976 (28th)	Fear on Trial		David W. Rintels	CBS
1976 (28th)	The Entertainer		Jeanne Houston, James D. Houston, and John Korty	NBC
1976 (28th)	NBC World Premiere Movie	"Farewell to Manzanar"	Barry Beckerman	NBC
1976 (28th)	Outstanding Writing in a Special Program – Drama or Comedy (Original)			
1976 (28th)	ABC Theater	"Eleanor and Franklin"	James Costigan	ABC
1976 (28th)	The ABC Friday Night Movie	"The Night That Panicked America"	Nicholas Meyer and Anthony Wilson	ABC
1976 (28th)	ABC Theater	"I Will Fight No More Forever"	Jeb Rosebrook and Theodore Strauss	ABC
1976 (28th)	Babe		Joanna Lee	CBS
1976 (28th)	NBC World Premiere Movie	"The Lindbergh Kidnapping Case"	JP Miller	NBC
1977 (29th)	Outstanding Writing in a Special Program – Drama or Comedy (Adaptation)			
1977 (29th)	Sybil		Stewart Stern	NBC
1977 (29th)	Bell System Presents	"The Man in the Iron Mask"	William Bast	NBC
1977 (29th)	A Circle of Children		Steve Gethers	CBS
1977 (29th)	Harry S. Truman: Plain Speaking		Carol Sobieski	PBS
1977 (29th)	NBC World Premiere Movie	"Judge Horton and the Scottsboro Boys"	John McGreevey	NBC
1977 (29th)	Outstanding Writing in a Special Program – Drama or Comedy (Original)			
1977 (29th)	The Big Event	"Tail Gunner Joe"	Lane Slate	NBC
1977 (29th)	The ABC Friday Night Movie	"The Boy in the Plastic Bubble"	Douglas Day Stewart and Joe Morgenstern	ABC
1977 (29th)	ABC Theater	"Eleanor and Franklin: The White House Years"	James Costigan	ABC
1977 (29th)	The Big Event	"Raid on Entebbe"	Barry Beckerman	NBC
1977 (29th)	Victory at Entebbe		Ernest Kinoy	ABC
1978 (30th)	Outstanding Writing in a Special Program – Drama or Comedy (Adaptation)			
1978 (30th)	Mary White		Caryl Ledner	ABC
1978 (30th)	Great Performances	"Verna: USO Girl"	Albert Innaurato	PBS
1978 (30th)	Hollywood Television Theatre	"Actor"	Jerome Lawrence and Robert E. Lee	PBS
1978 (30th)	A Love Affair: The Eleanor and Lou Gehrig Story		Blanche Hanalis	NBC
1978 (30th)	The War Between the Tates		Barbara Turner	NBC
1978 (30th)	Outstanding Writing in a Special Program – Drama or Comedy (Original)			
1978 (30th)	The Last Tenant		George Rubino	ABC
1978 (30th)	Breaking Up		Loring Mandel	ABC
1978 (30th)	The Defection of Simas Kudirka		Bruce Feldman	CBS
1978 (30th)	The Gathering		James Poe	ABC
1978 (30th)	Something for Joey		Jerry McNeely	CBS
1978 (30th)	The Storyteller		Richard Levinson and William Link	CBS
Outstanding Writing in a Limited Series or Special
1979 (31st)
1979 (31st)	The Jericho Mile		Michael Mann and Patrick J. Nolan	ABC
1979 (31st)	Backstairs at the White House	"Book One"	Gwen Bagni and Paul Dubov	NBC
1979 (31st)	Friendly Fire		Fay Kanin	ABC
1979 (31st)	Roots: The Next Generations	"Chapter 1 – 1880s"	Ernest Kinoy	ABC
1979 (31st)	Summer of My German Soldier		Jane-Howard Hammerstein	NBC

=== 1980s ===
Year	Program	Episode	Nominee(s)	Network
Outstanding Writing in a Limited Series or Special
1980 (32nd)
1980 (32nd)	Off the Minnesota Strip		David Chase	ABC
1980 (32nd)	Amber Waves		Ken Trevey	ABC
1980 (32nd)	Attica		James S. Henerson	ABC
1980 (32nd)	Hallmark Hall of Fame	"Gideon's Trumpet"	David W. Rintels	CBS
1980 (32nd)	Moviola	"This Year's Blonde"	James Lee	NBC
1981 (33rd)
1981 (33rd)	Playing for Time		Arthur Miller	CBS
1981 (33rd)	Bitter Harvest		Richard Friedenberg	NBC
1981 (33rd)	Masada	"Part 4"	Joel Oliansky	ABC
1981 (33rd)	The Shadow Box		Michael Cristofer	ABC
1981 (33rd)	Shōgun	"Part 5"	Eric Bercovici	NBC
1982 (34th)
1982 (34th)	Bill		Corey Blechman and Barry Morrow	CBS
1982 (34th)	Brideshead Revisited	"Et in Arcadia Ego"	John Mortimer	PBS
1982 (34th)	Oppenheimer	"Part 5"	Peter Prince	PBS
1982 (34th)	Sidney Shorr: A Girl's Best Friend		Oliver Hailey	NBC
1982 (34th)	Skokie		Ernest Kinoy	CBS
1983 (35th)
1983 (35th)	Special Bulletin		Marshall Herskovitz and Edward Zwick	NBC
1983 (35th)	The Executioner's Song		Norman Mailer	NBC
1983 (35th)	The Life and Adventures of Nicholas Nickleby	"Part 4"	David Edgar	Syndicated
1983 (35th)	Little Gloria... Happy at Last		William Hanley	NBC
1983 (35th)	Who Will Love My Children?		Michael Bortman	ABC
1984 (36th)
1984 (36th)	ABC Theater	"Something About Amelia"	William Hanley	ABC
1984 (36th)	ABC Theater	"The Day After"	Edward Hume	ABC
1984 (36th)	ABC Theater	"The Dollmaker"	Susan Cooper and Hume Cronyn	ABC
1984 (36th)	Adam		Allan Leicht	NBC
1984 (36th)	Ernie Kovacs: Between the Laughter		April Smith	ABC
1985 (37th)				ABC
1985 (37th)	Do You Remember Love		Vickie Patik	CBS
1985 (37th)	The Burning Bed		Rose Leiman Goldemberg	NBC
1985 (37th)	Fatal Vision		John Gay	NBC
1985 (37th)	The Jewel in the Crown	"Crossing the River"	Ken Taylor	PBS
1985 (37th)	Wallenberg: A Hero's Story		Gerald Green	NBC
Outstanding Writing in a Miniseries or Special
1986 (38th)
1986 (38th)	An Early Frost		Ron Cowen, Daniel Lipman and Sherman Yellen	NBC
1986 (38th)	Lord Mountbatten: The Last Viceroy		David Butler	PBS
1986 (38th)	Alex: The Life of a Child		Carol Evan McKeand and Nigel McKeand	ABC
1986 (38th)	Anne of Green Gables	"Part 1"	Kevin Sullivan and Joe Wiesenfeld	PBS
1986 (38th)	Dress Gray	"Part 1"	Gore Vidal	NBC
1986 (38th)	Hallmark Hall of Fame	"Love Is Never Silent"	Darlene Craviotto	CBS
1987 (39th)
1987 (39th)	Hallmark Hall of Fame	"Promise"	Richard Friedenberg, Ken Blackwell and Tennyson Flowers	CBS
1987 (39th)	Escape from Sobibor		Reginald Rose	CBS
1987 (39th)	Hallmark Hall of Fame	"Pack of Lies"	Hugh Whitemore	CBS
1987 (39th)	Nutcracker: Money, Madness & Murder	"Part 2"	William Hanley	NBC
1987 (39th)	A Year in the Life	"The First Christmas"	Joshua Brand and John Falsey	NBC
1988 (40th)
1988 (40th)	The Attic: The Hiding of Anne Frank		William Hanley	CBS
1988 (40th)	Baby M	"Part 1"	James Steven Sadwith	ABC
1988 (40th)	Billionaire Boys Club	"Part 1"	Gy Waldron	NBC
1988 (40th)	Hallmark Hall of Fame	"Foxfire"	Susan Cooper	CBS
1988 (40th)	The Murder of Mary Phagan		Jeffrey Lane and George Stevens Jr.	NBC
1989 (41st)
1989 (41st)	Murderers Among Us: The Simon Wiesenthal Story		Abby Mann, Robin Vote and Ron Hutchinson	HBO
1989 (41st)	Hallmark Hall of Fame	"My Name Is Bill W."	William G. Borchert	ABC
1989 (41st)	I Know My First Name Is Steven		JP Miller and Cynthia Whitcomb	NBC
1989 (41st)	Lonesome Dove	"Part I: Leaving"	William D. Wittliff	CBS
1989 (41st)	Roe vs. Wade		Alison Cross	NBC

=== 1990s ===
Year	Program	Episode	Nominee(s)	Network
Outstanding Writing in a Miniseries or Special
1990 (42nd)
1990 (42nd)	American Playhouse	"Andre's Mother"	Terrence McNally	PBS
1990 (42nd)	AT&T Presents	"The Final Days"	Hugh Whitemore	ABC
1990 (42nd)	AT&T Presents	"The Incident"	Michael Norell and James Norell	CBS
1990 (42nd)	Hallmark Hall of Fame	"Caroline?"	Michael De Guzman	CBS
1990 (42nd)	The Kennedys of Massachusetts		William Hanley	ABC
1991 (43rd)
1991 (43rd)	House of Cards		Andrew Davies	PBS
1991 (43rd)	Hallmark Hall of Fame	"Decoration Day"	Robert W. Lenski	NBC
1991 (43rd)	Hallmark Hall of Fame	"Sarah, Plain and Tall"	Patricia MacLachlan and Carol Sobieski	CBS
1991 (43rd)	Paris Trout		Pete Dexter	Showtime
1991 (43rd)	Separate But Equal		George Stevens Jr.	ABC
Outstanding Individual Achievement in Writing in a Miniseries or Special
1992 (44th)
1992 (44th)	I'll Fly Away	"Pilot"	Joshua Brand and John Falsey	NBC
1992 (44th)	Broadway Bound		Neil Simon	ABC
1992 (44th)	Doing Time on Maple Drive		James Duff	Fox
1992 (44th)	Hallmark Hall of Fame	"Miss Rose White"	Anna Sandor	NBC
1992 (44th)	Without Warning: The James Brady Story		Robert Bolt	HBO
1993 (45th)
1993 (45th)	The Positively True Adventures of the Alleged Texas Cheerleader-Murdering Mom		Jane Anderson	HBO
1993 (45th)	Barbarians at the Gate		Larry Gelbart	HBO
1993 (45th)	Citizen Cohn		David Franzoni	HBO
1993 (45th)	Family Pictures		Jennifer Miller	ABC
1993 (45th)	Stalin		Paul Monash	HBO
1994 (46th)
1994 (46th)	David's Mother		Bob Randall	CBS
1994 (46th)	And the Band Played On		Arnold Schulman	HBO
1994 (46th)	Breathing Lessons		Robert W. Lenski	CBS
1994 (46th)	Prime Suspect 3		Lynda La Plante	PBS
1994 (46th)	Tales of the City		Richard Kramer	PBS
1995 (47th)
1995 (47th)	Serving in Silence: The Margarethe Cammermeyer Story		Alison Cross	NBC
1995 (47th)	The Burning Season		William Mastrosimone, Michael Tolkin and Ron Hutchinson	HBO
1995 (47th)	Citizen X		Chris Gerolmo	HBO
1995 (47th)	Indictment: The McMartin Trial		Abby Mann and Myra Mann	HBO
1995 (47th)	Hallmark Hall of Fame	"The Piano Lesson"	August Wilson	CBS
Outstanding Writing for a Miniseries or Special
1996 (48th)
1996 (48th)	Gulliver's Travels		Simon Moore	NBC
1996 (48th)	The Late Shift		George Armitage and Bill Carter	HBO
1996 (48th)	Pride and Prejudice		Andrew Davies	A&E
1996 (48th)	Truman		Thomas Rickman	HBO
1996 (48th)	The Tuskegee Airmen		Paris Qualles, Trey Ellis, Ron Hutchinson, Robert W. Williams and T. S. Cook	HBO
1997 (49th)
1997 (49th)	Hallmark Hall of Fame	"Old Man"	Horton Foote	CBS
1997 (49th)	Crime of the Century		William Nicholson	HBO
1997 (49th)	Gotti		Steve Shagan	HBO
1997 (49th)	Miss Evers' Boys		Walter Bernstein	HBO
1997 (49th)	Weapons of Mass Distraction		Larry Gelbart	HBO
Outstanding Writing for a Miniseries or Movie
1998 (50th)
1998 (50th)	Don King: Only in America		Kario Salem	HBO
1998 (50th)	From the Earth to the Moon	"Apollo One"	Graham Yost	HBO
1998 (50th)	Gia		Jay McInerney and Michael Cristofer	HBO
1998 (50th)	Merlin		Edward Khmara, David Stevens, and Peter Barnes	NBC
1998 (50th)	More Tales of the City		Nicholas Wright	Showtime
1999 (51st)
1999 (51st)	A Lesson Before Dying		Ann Peacock	HBO
1999 (51st)	The Baby Dance		Jane Anderson	Showtime
1999 (51st)	Dash and Lilly		Jerrold L. Ludwig	A&E
1999 (51st)	Pirates of Silicon Valley		Martyn Burke	TNT
1999 (51st)	The Rat Pack		Kario Salem	HBO

=== 2000s ===
Year	Program	Episode	Nominee(s)	Network
Outstanding Writing for a Miniseries or Movie
2000 (52nd)
2000 (52nd)	The Corner		David Mills and David Simon	HBO
2000 (52nd)	Cheaters		John Stockwell	HBO
2000 (52nd)	Homicide: The Movie		Tom Fontana, Eric Overmyer and James Yoshimura	NBC
2000 (52nd)	If These Walls Could Talk 2	"1961"	Jane Anderson	HBO
2000 (52nd)	RKO 281		John Logan	HBO
2001 (53rd)
2001 (53rd)	Conspiracy		Loring Mandel	HBO
2001 (53rd)	61*		Hank Steinberg	HBO
2001 (53rd)	Anne Frank: The Whole Story		Kirk Ellis	ABC
2001 (53rd)	Life with Judy Garland: Me and My Shadows		Robert Freedman	ABC
2001 (53rd)	Wit		Mike Nichols and Emma Thompson	HBO
Outstanding Writing for a Miniseries, Movie or Dramatic Special
2002 (54th)
2002 (54th)	The Gathering Storm		Larry Ramin and Hugh Whitemore	HBO
2002 (54th)	Band of Brothers		Erik Bork, E. Max Frye, Tom Hanks, Erik Jendresen, Bruce C. McKenna, John Orloff, and Graham Yost	HBO
2002 (54th)	The Laramie Project		Stephen Belber, Leigh Fondakowski, Amanda Gronich, Moisés Kaufman, Jeffrey LaHoste, John McAdams, Andy Paris, Greg Pierotti, Barbara Pitts, Kelli Simpkins and Stephen Wangh	HBO
2002 (54th)	Path to War		Daniel Giat	HBO
2002 (54th)	Shackleton		Charles Sturridge	A&E
2003 (55th)
2003 (55th)	Door to Door		William H. Macy and Steven Schachter	TNT
2003 (55th)	Hysterical Blindness		Laura Cahill	HBO
2003 (55th)	Live from Baghdad		Richard Chapman, Timothy Sexton, John Patrick Shanley and Robert Wiener	HBO
2003 (55th)	My House in Umbria		Hugh Whitemore	HBO
2003 (55th)	Normal		Jane Anderson	HBO
2004 (56th)
2004 (56th)	Angels in America		Tony Kushner	HBO
2004 (56th)	And Starring Pancho Villa as Himself		Larry Gelbart	HBO
2004 (56th)	Iron Jawed Angels		Eugenia Bostwick-Singer, Jennifer Friedes, Sally Robinson and Raymond Singer	HBO
2004 (56th)	The Reagans		Elizabeth Egloff, Jane Marchwood and Tom Rickman	Showtime
2004 (56th)	Something the Lord Made		Robert Caswell and Peter Silverman	HBO
2005 (57th)
2005 (57th)	The Life and Death of Peter Sellers		Christopher Markus and Stephen McFeely	HBO
2005 (57th)	Empire Falls		Richard Russo	HBO
2005 (57th)	The 4400	"Pilot"	René Echevarria and Scott Peters	USA
2005 (57th)	The Office Special		Ricky Gervais and Stephen Merchant	BBC America
2005 (57th)	Warm Springs		Margaret Nagle	HBO
2006 (58th)
2006 (58th)	The Girl in the Café		Richard Curtis	HBO
2006 (58th)	Bleak House		Andrew Davies	PBS
2006 (58th)	Elizabeth I		Nigel Williams	HBO
2006 (58th)	Flight 93		Nevin Schreiner	A&E
2006 (58th)	Mrs. Harris		Phyllis Nagy	HBO
2007 (59th)
2007 (59th)	Prime Suspect: The Final Act		Frank Deasy	PBS
2007 (59th)	Broken Trail		Alan Geoffrion	AMC
2007 (59th)	Bury My Heart at Wounded Knee		Daniel Giat	HBO
2007 (59th)	Jane Eyre		Sandy Welch	PBS
2007 (59th)	The Starter Wife		Josann McGibbon and Sara Parriott	USA
2008 (60th)
2008 (60th)	John Adams	"Independence"	Kirk Ellis	HBO
2008 (60th)	Bernard and Doris		Hugh Costello	HBO
2008 (60th)	Cranford		Heidi Thomas	PBS
2008 (60th)	Extras	"The Extra Special Series Finale"	Ricky Gervais and Stephen Merchant	HBO
2008 (60th)	Recount		Danny Strong	HBO
2009 (61st)
2009 (61st)	Little Dorrit		Andrew Davies	PBS
2009 (61st)	Generation Kill	"Bomb in the Garden"	Ed Burns and David Simon	HBO
2009 (61st)	Grey Gardens		Patricia Rozema and Michael Sucsy	HBO
2009 (61st)	Into the Storm		Hugh Whitemore	HBO
2009 (61st)	Taking Chance		Ross Katz and Michael Strobl	HBO

=== 2010s ===
Year	Program	Episode	Nominee(s)	Network
Outstanding Writing for a Miniseries, Movie or Dramatic Special
2010 (62nd)
2010 (62nd)	You Don't Know Jack		Adam Mazer	HBO
2010 (62nd)	The Pacific	"Part 8"	Michelle Ashford and Robert Schenkkan	HBO
2010 (62nd)	The Pacific	"Part 10"	Bruce C. McKenna and Robert Schenkkan	HBO
2010 (62nd)	The Special Relationship		Peter Morgan	HBO
2010 (62nd)	Temple Grandin		William Merritt Johnson and Christopher Monger	HBO
2011 (63rd)
2011 (63rd)	Downton Abbey		Julian Fellowes	PBS
2011 (63rd)	Mildred Pierce		Todd Haynes and Jonathan Raymond	HBO
2011 (63rd)	Sherlock	"A Study in Pink"	Steven Moffat	PBS
2011 (63rd)	Too Big to Fail		Peter Gould	HBO
2011 (63rd)	Upstairs, Downstairs		Heidi Thomas	PBS
2012 (64th)
2012 (64th)	Game Change		Danny Strong	HBO
2012 (64th)	Hatfields & McCoys	"Part 2"	Bill Kerby, Ted Mann and Ronald Parker	History
2012 (64th)	The Hour		Abi Morgan	BBC America
2012 (64th)	Luther		Neil Cross	BBC America
2012 (64th)	Sherlock	"A Scandal in Belgravia"	Steven Moffat	PBS
2013 (65th)
2013 (65th)	The Hour		Abi Morgan	BBC America
2013 (65th)	Behind the Candelabra		Richard LaGravenese	HBO
2013 (65th)	Parade's End		Tom Stoppard	HBO
2013 (65th)	Phil Spector		David Mamet	HBO
2013 (65th)	Top of the Lake		Jane Campion and Gerard Lee	Sundance
2014 (66th)
2014 (66th)	Sherlock	"His Last Vow"	Steven Moffat	PBS
2014 (66th)	American Horror Story: Coven	"Bitchcraft"	Ryan Murphy and Brad Falchuk	FX
2014 (66th)	Fargo	"The Crocodile's Dilemma"	Noah Hawley	FX
2014 (66th)	Luther		Neil Cross	BBC America
2014 (66th)	The Normal Heart		Larry Kramer	HBO
2014 (66th)	Treme	"...To Miss New Orleans"	David Simon and Eric Overmyer	HBO
Outstanding Writing for a Limited Series, Movie or Dramatic Special
2015 (67th)
2015 (67th)	Olive Kitteridge		Jane Anderson	HBO
2015 (67th)	American Crime	"Episode One"	John Ridley	ABC
2015 (67th)	Bessie		Dee Rees, Christopher Cleveland, Bettina Gilois and Horton Foote (posthumous)	HBO
2015 (67th)	Hello Ladies: The Movie		Stephen Merchant, Gene Stupnitsky and Lee Eisenberg	HBO
2015 (67th)	The Honorable Woman		Hugo Blick	Sundance
2015 (67th)	Wolf Hall		Peter Straughan	PBS
2016 (68th)
2016 (68th)	The People v. O. J. Simpson: American Crime Story	"Marcia, Marcia, Marcia"	D. V. DeVincentis	FX
2016 (68th)	Fargo	"Loplop"	Bob DeLaurentis	FX
2016 (68th)	Fargo	"Palindrome"	Noah Hawley	FX
2016 (68th)	The Night Manager		David Farr	AMC
2016 (68th)	The People v. O. J. Simpson: American Crime Story	"From the Ashes of Tragedy"	Scott Alexander and Larry Karaszewski	FX
2016 (68th)	The People v. O. J. Simpson: American Crime Story	"The Race Card"	Joe Robert Cole	FX
2017 (69th)
2017 (69th)	Black Mirror	"San Junipero"	Charlie Brooker	Netflix
2017 (69th)	Big Little Lies		David E. Kelley	HBO
2017 (69th)	Fargo	"The Law of Vacant Places"	Noah Hawley	FX
2017 (69th)	Feud: Bette and Joan	"And the Winner Is... (The Oscars of 1963)"	Ryan Murphy	FX
2017 (69th)	Feud: Bette and Joan	"Pilot"	Jaffe Cohen, Michael Zam and Ryan Murphy	FX
2017 (69th)	The Night Of	"The Call of the Wild"	Richard Price and Steven Zaillian	HBO
2018 (70th)
2018 (70th)	Black Mirror	"USS Callister"	Charlie Brooker and William Bridges	Netflix
2018 (70th)	American Vandal	"Clean Up"	Kevin McManus and Matthew McManus	Netflix
2018 (70th)	The Assassination of Gianni Versace: American Crime Story	"House by the Lake"	Tom Rob Smith	FX
2018 (70th)	Godless		Scott Frank	Netflix
2018 (70th)	Patrick Melrose		David Nicholls	Showtime
2018 (70th)	Twin Peaks		Mark Frost and David Lynch	Showtime
2019 (71st)
2019 (71st)	Chernobyl		Craig Mazin	HBO
2019 (71st)	Escape at Dannemora	"Episode 6"	Brett Johnson, Michael Tolkin and Jerry Stahl	Showtime
2019 (71st)	Escape at Dannemora	"Episode 7"	Brett Johnson and Michael Tolkin	Showtime
2019 (71st)	Fosse/Verdon	"Providence"	Steven Levenson and Joel Fields	FX
2019 (71st)	A Very English Scandal		Russell T Davies	Prime Video
2019 (71st)	When They See Us	"Part 4"	Ava DuVernay and Michael Starrbury	Netflix

=== 2020s ===
Year	Program	Episode	Nominee(s)	Network
Outstanding Writing for a Limited Series, Movie or Dramatic Special
2020 (72nd)
2020 (72nd)	Watchmen	"This Extraordinary Being"	Damon Lindelof and Cord Jefferson	HBO
2020 (72nd)	Mrs. America	"Shirley"	Tanya Barfield	FX
2020 (72nd)	Normal People	"Episode 3"	Sally Rooney and Alice Birch	Hulu
2020 (72nd)	Unbelievable	"Episode 1"	Susannah Grant, Michael Chabon and Ayelet Waldman	Netflix
2020 (72nd)	Unorthodox	"Part 1"	Anna Winger	Netflix
Outstanding Writing for a Limited or Anthology Series or Movie
2021 (73rd)
2021 (73rd)	I May Destroy You		Michaela Coel	HBO
2021 (73rd)	Mare of Easttown		Brad Ingelsby	HBO
2021 (73rd)	The Queen's Gambit		Scott Frank	Netflix
2021 (73rd)	WandaVision	"All-New Halloween Spooktacular!"	Chuck Hayward and Peter Cameron	Disney+
2021 (73rd)	WandaVision	"Filmed Before a Live Studio Audience"	Jac Schaeffer	Disney+
2021 (73rd)	WandaVision	"Previously On"	Laura Donney	Disney+
2022 (74th)
2022 (74th)	The White Lotus		Mike White	HBO
2022 (74th)	Dopesick	"The People vs. Purdue Pharma"	Danny Strong	Hulu
2022 (74th)	The Dropout	"I'm in a Hurry"	Elizabeth Meriwether	Hulu
2022 (74th)	Impeachment: American Crime Story	"Man Handled"	Sarah Burgess	FX
2022 (74th)	Maid	"Snaps"	Molly Smith Metzler	Netflix
2022 (74th)	Station Eleven	"Unbroken Circle"	Patrick Somerville	HBO Max
2023 (75th)
2023 (75th)	Beef	"The Birds Don't Sing, They Screech in Pain"	Lee Sung Jin	Netflix
2023 (75th)	Fire Island		Joel Kim Booster	Hulu
2023 (75th)	Fleishman Is in Trouble	"Me-Time"	Taffy Brodesser-Akner	FX
2023 (75th)	Prey		Patrick Aison and Dan Trachtenberg	Hulu
2023 (75th)	Swarm	"Stung"	Janine Nabers and Donald Glover	Prime Video
2023 (75th)	Weird: The Al Yankovic Story		Al Yankovic and Eric Appel	Roku
2024 (76th)
2024 (76th)	Baby Reindeer		Richard Gadd	Netflix
2024 (76th)	Black Mirror	"Joan Is Awful"	Charlie Brooker	Netflix
2024 (76th)	Fargo	"The Tragedy of the Commons"	Noah Hawley	FX
2024 (76th)	Fellow Travelers	"You're Wonderful"	Ron Nyswaner	Showtime
2024 (76th)	Ripley		Steven Zaillian	Netflix
2024 (76th)	True Detective: Night Country	"Part 6"	Issa López	HBO
2025 (77th)
2025 (77th)	Adolescence		Jack Thorne and Stephen Graham	Netflix
2025 (77th)	Black Mirror	"Common People"	Charlie Brooker and Bisha K. Ali	Netflix
2025 (77th)	Dying for Sex	"Good Value Diet Soda"	Kim Rosenstock and Elizabeth Meriwether	FX
2025 (77th)	The Penguin	"A Great or Little Thing"	Lauren LeFranc	HBO
2025 (77th)	Say Nothing	"The People in the Dirt"	Joshua Zetumer	FX
2026 (78th)
2026 (78th)	DTF St. Louis		Steven Conrad	HBO
2026 (78th)	All Her Fault	"Episode 8"	Megan Gallagher	Peacock
2026 (78th)	The Beast in Me	"Sick Puppy"	Gabe Rotter and Daniel Pearle	Netflix
2026 (78th)	Beef	"All the Things We're Never Going to Have"	Lee Sung Jin	Netflix
2026 (78th)	Death by Lightning		Mike Makowsky	Netflix

== Total awards by network ==
- HBO – 18
- CBS – 13
- ABC – 9
- PBS – 8
- NBC – 7
- Netflix – 5
- BBC America – 1
- FX – 1
- TNT - 1

== Individuals with multiple awards ==
2 awards

- Jane Anderson
- Charlie Brooker
- James Costigan
- Andrew Davies
- William Hanley
- Abby Mann
- Tracy Keenan Wynn

== Individuals with multiple nominations ==
5 nominations

- Jane Anderson
- William Hanley
- Noah Hawley
- Hugh Whitemore

4 nominations

- Charlie Brooker
- Andrew Davies

3 nominations

- James Costigan
- Larry Gelbart
- Ron Hutchinson
- Fay Kanin
- Ernest Kinoy
- Richard Levinson
- William Link
- Abby Mann
- Stephen Merchant
- Steven Moffat
- Ryan Murphy
- David W. Rintels
- David Simon
- Danny Strong
- Tracy Keenan Wynn

2 nominations

- Barry Beckerman
- Joshua Brand
- Susan Cooper
- Michael Cristofer
- Alison Cross
- Neil Cross
- Kirk Ellis
- John Falsey
- Horton Foote
- Scott Frank
- Richard Friedenberg
- Ricky Gervais
- Daniel Giat
- Brett Johnson
- David Karp
- Robert W. Lenski
- Loring Mandel
- Bruce C. McKenna
- Elizabeth Meriwether
- JP Miller
- Abi Morgan
- Joel Oliansky
- Eric Overmyer
- Kario Salem
- Robert Schenkkan
- Carol Sobieski
- George Stevens Jr.
- Lee Sung Jin
- Heidi Thomas
- Michael Tolkin
- Graham Yost
- Steven Zaillian

== Programs with multiple awards ==
2 awards

- Black Mirror (consecutive)

== Programs with multiple nominations ==
5 nominations

- American Crime Story
- Fargo

4 nominations

- Black Mirror

3 nominations

- Sherlock
- WandaVision

2 nominations

- Beef
- Escape at Dannemora
- Feud
- The Hour
- Luther
- The Pacific
- Prime Suspect
