= 44th Primetime Emmy Awards =

1992 American television programming awards

- Date: August 30, 1992
- Location: Pasadena Civic Auditorium, Pasadena, California
- Presented by: Academy of Television Arts and Sciences
- Hosted by: Tim Allen; Kirstie Alley; Dennis Miller

Highlights
- Most awards: Miss Rose White; Murphy Brown; Northern Exposure (3)
- Most nominations: Northern Exposure (9)
- Outstanding Comedy Series: Murphy Brown
- Outstanding Drama Series: Northern Exposure
- Outstanding Miniseries: A Woman Named Jackie
- Outstanding Variety, Music or Comedy Program: The Tonight Show Starring Johnny Carson

Television/radio coverage
- Network: Fox

The 44th Primetime Emmy Awards were held on Sunday, August 30, 1992. The ceremony was broadcast on Fox from the Pasadena Civic Auditorium in Pasadena, California. It was hosted by Tim Allen, Kirstie Alley and Dennis Miller, and directed by Walter C. Miller. Presenters included Roseanne Barr, Tom Arnold, Scott Bakula, Candice Bergen, Corbin Bernsen, Beau Bridges, Lloyd Bridges, and Cindy Crawford. The program was written by Buddy Sheffield and Bruce Vilanch. Over 300 million people watched the ceremony in 30 countries. 27 awards were presented.

A rule change, instituted for this year only, stated that regular and guest performers would compete in the same category. There could be lead guest or supporting guest. This rule allowed Hollywood stalwarts such as Kirk Douglas, who appeared in one episode of the anthology series Tales from the Crypt, and Christopher Lloyd, who guest-starred on Road to Avonlea, to be nominated for the leading actor award (and, in Lloyd's case, to win). However, the rule also meant that, for instance, Harrison Page got nominated as a lead on Quantum Leap alongside Scott Bakula, even though Page appeared in a supporting role in one episode while Bakula starred in every installment, and Shirley Knight got nominated for one episode of Law & Order while the regular cast didn't receive any nominations. The rule was reverted the following year.

On the comedy side, Murphy Brown won Outstanding Comedy Series for the second time, winning three major awards on the night, the most for a comedy series. On the drama side, L.A. Law's strangle hold on Outstanding Drama Series came to an end, as Northern Exposure took home the award. Northern Exposure also won three major awards and received nine major nominations, which tied for the most in each category. For the first time in its run, The Golden Girls, then in its seventh and final season, was not nominated for Outstanding Comedy Series.

For the first time, the Lead Actor, Drama award went outside the Big Four television networks to a cable network show: Christopher Lloyd in Road to Avonlea, from the Disney Channel.

After being on the air for thirty years, The Tonight Show Starring Johnny Carson finally heard its name called when its final season won for Outstanding Variety, Music, or Comedy Program. The show was first nominated for the category in 1964 and was 0/13 before this ceremony.

As of the 2021 Emmy ceremony, this was the last year where the Big Four broadcast networks received all the nominations in both the Comedy and Drama Series categories.

== Winners and nominees ==
=== Programs ===
| Outstanding Comedy Series: Murphy Brown (CBS); Brooklyn Bridge (CBS); Cheers (NBC); Home Improvement (ABC); Seinfeld (NBC) | Outstanding Drama Series: Northern Exposure (CBS); I'll Fly Away (NBC); L.A. Law (NBC); Law & Order (NBC); Quantum Leap (NBC) |
| Outstanding Variety, Music or Comedy Program (Series): The Tonight Show Starring Johnny Carson (NBC); In Living Color (Fox); Late Night with David Letterman (NBC) (Episode: "10th Anniversary Special") | Outstanding Variety, Music or Comedy Program (Special): Cirque du Soleil II: A New Experience (HBO); Comic Relief V (HBO); Unforgettable, with Love: Natalie Cole Sings the Songs of Nat King Cole (PBS) |
| Outstanding Made for Television Movie: Miss Rose White (NBC); Doing Time on Maple Drive (Fox); Homefront: "Pilot" (ABC); I'll Fly Away: "Pilot" (NBC); Without Warning: The James Brady Story (HBO) | Outstanding Miniseries: A Woman Named Jackie (NBC); The Burden of Proof (ABC); Cruel Doubt (NBC); Drug Wars: The Cocaine Cartel (NBC); In a Child's Name (CBS) |

=== Acting ===
==== Lead performances ====
| Outstanding Lead Actor in a Comedy Series: Craig T. Nelson as Coach Hayden Fox in Coach (ABC) (Episode: "A Real Guy's Guy"); Ted Danson as Sam Malone in Cheers (NBC) (Episode: "Go Make"); John Goodman as Dan Conner in Roseanne (ABC) (Episode: "The Back Story"); Kelsey Grammer as Dr. Frasier Crane in Wings (NBC) (Episode: "Planes, Trains, and Visiting Cranes"); Burt Reynolds as Wood Newton in Evening Shade (CBS) (Episode: "Callous Hearts of Rage"); Jerry Seinfeld as Jerry Seinfeld in Seinfeld (NBC) (Episode: "The Boyfriend") | Outstanding Lead Actress in a Comedy Series: Candice Bergen as Murphy Brown in Murphy Brown (CBS) (Episode: "Birth 101"); Kirstie Alley as Rebecca Howe in Cheers (NBC) (Episode: "An Old Fashioned Wedding"); Roseanne Barr as Roseanne Conner in Roseanne (ABC) (Episode: "A Bitter Pill to Swallow"); Tyne Daly as Mimsy Borogroves in Wings (NBC) (Episode: "My Brother's Keeper"); Marion Ross as Sophie Berger in Brooklyn Bridge (CBS) (Episode: "When Irish Eyes Are Smiling"); Betty White as Rose Nylund in The Golden Girls (NBC) (Episode: "Dateline: Miami") |
| Outstanding Lead Actor in a Drama Series: Christopher Lloyd as Alistair Dimple in Road to Avonlea (Disney) (Episode: "Another Point of View"); Scott Bakula as Sam Beckett in Quantum Leap (NBC) (Episode: "Dreams: February 28, 1979"); Kirk Douglas as General Kalthrob in Tales from the Crypt (HBO) (Episode: "Yellow"); Michael Moriarty as Ben Stone in Law & Order (NBC) (Episode: "The Wages of Love"); Rob Morrow as Joel Fleischman in Northern Exposure (CBS) (Episode: "Jules et Joel"); Harrison Page as Reverend Walters in Quantum Leap (NBC) (Episode: "Song for the Soul: April 7, 1963"); Sam Waterston as Forrest Bedford in I'll Fly Away (NBC) (Episode: "Hard Lessons Master Magician") | Outstanding Lead Actress in a Drama Series: Dana Delany as Nurse Colleen McMurphy in China Beach (ABC) (Episode: "Through and Through"); Sharon Gless as Rosie O'Neill in The Trials of Rosie O'Neill (CBS) (Episode: "Heartbreak Hotel"); Shirley Knight as Melanie Cullen in Law & Order (NBC) (Episode: "The Wages of Love"); Angela Lansbury as Jessica Fletcher in Murder, She Wrote (CBS) (Episode: "Night Fears"); Kate Nelligan as Sydney Carver in Road to Avonlea, (Disney) (Episode: "After the Honeymoon"); Regina Taylor as Lilly in I'll Fly Away (NBC) (Episode: "Coming Home") |
| Outstanding Lead Actor in a Miniseries or a Special: Beau Bridges as James Brady in Without Warning: The James Brady Story (HBO); Rubén Blades as Ernesto Ontiveros in Crazy from the Heart (TNT); Hume Cronyn as Cleveland Meriwether in Christmas on Division Street (CBS); Brian Dennehy as John Wayne Gacy in To Catch a Killer (Syndicated); Maximilian Schell as Mordecai Weiss in Miss Rose White (NBC) | Outstanding Lead Actress in a Miniseries or a Special: Gena Rowlands as Pat Foster in Face of a Stranger (CBS); Anne Bancroft as Lillian Cage in Mrs. Cage (PBS); Meredith Baxter as Betty Broderick in A Woman Scorned: The Betty Broderick Story (CBS); Judy Davis as Countess Mary Lindell in One Against the Wind (CBS); Laura Dern as Janet Harduvel in Afterburn (HBO) |

==== Supporting performances ====
| Outstanding Supporting Actor in a Comedy Series: Michael Jeter as Herman Stiles in Evening Shade (CBS) (Episodes: "Herman in Charge" + "Hasta la Vista"); Jason Alexander as George Costanza in Seinfeld (NBC) (Episodes: "The Note" + "The Tape"); Charles Durning as Dr. Harlan Elldridge in Evening Shade (CBS) (Episode: "Three Naked Men"); Harvey Fierstein as Mark Newberger in Cheers (NBC) (Episode: "Rebecca's Lover... Not"); Jay Thomas as Jerry Gold in Murphy Brown (CBS) (Episodes: "Uh-Oh", Parts 2 & 3 + "Lovesick"); Jerry Van Dyke as Luther Van Dam in Coach (ABC) (Episodes: "I Think I Can't, I Think I Can't" + "Last of the Red-Hot Luthers") | Outstanding Supporting Actress in a Comedy Series: Laurie Metcalf as Jackie Harris in Roseanne (ABC) (Episodes: "Why Jackie Becomes a Trucker" + "Kansas City, Here We Come"); Faith Ford as Corky Sherwood in Murphy Brown (CBS) (Episodes: "Love is Blonde" + "A Chance of Showers"); Estelle Getty as Sophia Petrillo in The Golden Girls (NBC) (Episode: "One Flew Out of the Cuckoo's Nest"); Alice Ghostley as Bernice Clifton in Designing Women (CBS) (Episodes: "The Strange Case of Clarence and Anita" + "Just Say Doe"); Julia Louis-Dreyfus as Elaine Benes in Seinfeld (NBC) (Episodes: "The Pen" + "The Tape"); Frances Sternhagen as Esther Clavin in Cheers (NBC) (Episode: "Heeeeeere's... Cliffy!") |
| Outstanding Supporting Actor in a Drama Series: Richard Dysart as Leland McKenzie Jr. in L.A. Law (NBC) (Episodes: "Monkey on My Back Lot" + "P.S. Your Shrink Is Dead"); Edward Asner as Walter Kovacs in The Trials of Rosie O'Neill (CBS) (Episodes: "Knock, Knock" + "Happy Birthday or Else"); John Corbett as Chris Stevens in Northern Exposure (CBS) (Episodes: "Only You" + "Burning Down the House"); Richard Kiley as Doug in The Ray Bradbury Theater (USA) (Episode: "The Utterly Perfect Murder"); Jimmy Smits as Victor Sifuentes in L.A. Law (NBC) (Episodes: "Steal It Again, Sam" + "Say Goodnight, Gracie"); Dean Stockwell as Al Calavicci in Quantum Leap (NBC) (Episodes: "The Leap Back: June 15, 1945" + "Dreams: February 28, 1979") | Outstanding Supporting Actress in a Drama Series: Valerie Mahaffey as Eve in Northern Exposure (CBS) (Episodes: "The Bumpy Road to Love" + "Lost and Found" + "Our Wedding"); Mary Alice as Marguerite Peck in I'll Fly Away (NBC) (Episodes: "Hard Lessons" + "A Dangerous Comfort"); Barbara Barrie as Mrs. Bream in Law & Order (NBC) (Episode: "Vengeance"); Conchata Ferrell as Susan Bloom in L.A. Law (NBC) (Episodes: "Spleen It to Me, Lucy" + "P.S. Your Shrink Is Dead"); Cynthia Geary as Shelly Tambo in Northern Exposure (CBS) (Episodes: "Oy, Wilderness" + "Get Real"); Marg Helgenberger as KC Kolowski in China Beach (ABC) (Episodes: "100 Klicks Out" + "The Always Goodbye"); Kay Lenz as Maggie Zombro in Reasonable Doubts (NBC) (Episodes: "One Woman's Word" + "Maggie Finds Her Soul") |
| Outstanding Supporting Actor in a Miniseries or a Special: Hume Cronyn as Ben in Broadway Bound (ABC); Brian Dennehy as Dixon Hartnell in The Burden of Proof (ABC); Hector Elizondo as Lt. Angel in Mrs. Cage (PBS); Jerry Orbach as Jack Jerome in Broadway Bound (ABC); Ben Vereen as Gene Randall in Intruders (CBS) | Outstanding Supporting Actress in a Miniseries or a Special: Amanda Plummer as Lusia Weiss in Miss Rose White (NBC); Anne Bancroft as Kate Jerome in Broadway Bound (ABC); Bibi Besch as Lisa Carter in Doing Time on Maple Drive (Fox); Penny Fuller as Kate Ryan in Miss Rose White (NBC); Maureen Stapleton as Tanta Perla in Miss Rose White (NBC) |

==== Individual performances ====
Outstanding Individual Performance in a Variety or Music Program
- Bette Midler – The Tonight Show Starring Johnny Carson (NBC)
  - George Carlin – George Carlin Live at Paramount: Jammin' in New York (HBO)
  - Dana Carvey – Saturday Night Live (NBC)
  - Natalie Cole – Unforgettable, with Love: Natalie Cole Sings the Songs of Nat King Cole (PBS)
  - Billy Crystal – The 64th Annual Academy Awards (ABC)

=== Directing ===
| Outstanding Individual Achievement in Directing in a Comedy Series: Murphy Brown (CBS): "Birth 101" – Barnet Kellman; Brooklyn Bridge (CBS): "When Irish Eyes are Smiling" – Sam Weisman; Cheers (NBC): "An Old Fashioned Wedding" – James Burrows; Murphy Brown (CBS): "Send in the Clowns" – Lee Shallat Chemel; Seinfeld (NBC): "The Tape" – David Steinberg | Outstanding Individual Achievement in Directing in a Drama Series: I'll Fly Away (NBC): "All God's Children" – Eric Laneuville; China Beach (ABC): "Rewind" – Mimi Leder; L.A. Law (NBC): "Say Goodnight, Gracie" – Rick Wallace; Northern Exposure (CBS): "Seoul Mates" – Jack Bender; The Trials of Rosie O'Neill (CBS): "Heartbreak Hotel" – Nancy Malone |
| Outstanding Individual Achievement in Directing in a Variety or Music Program: Unforgettable, with Love: Natalie Cole Sings the Songs of Nat King Cole (PBS) – Patricia Birch; The 45th Annual Tony Awards (CBS) – Walter C. Miller; The 64th Annual Academy Awards (ABC) – Jeff Margolis; Late Night with David Letterman (NBC): "10th Anniversary Special" – Hal Gurnee; The Tonight Show Starring Johnny Carson (NBC) – Bobby Quinn | Outstanding Individual Achievement in Directing for a Miniseries or a Special: Miss Rose White (NBC) – Joseph Sargent; Broadway Bound (ABC) – Paul Bogart; Crash Landing: The Rescue of Flight 232 (ABC) – Lamont Johnson; Homefront: "Pilot" (ABC) – Ron Lagomarsino; I'll Fly Away: "Pilot" (NBC) – Joshua Brand; Mark Twain and Me (Disney) – Daniel Petrie |

=== Writing ===
| Outstanding Individual Achievement in Writing in a Comedy Series: Seinfeld (NBC): "The Fix-Up" – Elaine Pope and Larry Charles; Murphy Brown (CBS): "Come Out, Come Out, Wherever You Are" – Gary Dontzig and Steven Peterman; Murphy Brown (CBS): "Uh Oh", Part 2" – Story by : Korby Siamis and Diane English Teleplay by : Diane English; Roseanne (ABC): "A Bitter Pill To Swallow" – Amy Sherman and Jennifer Heath; Seinfeld (NBC): "The Parking Garage" – Larry David; Seinfeld (NBC): "The Tape" – Larry David, Bob Shaw and Don McEnery | Outstanding Individual Achievement in Writing in a Drama Series: Northern Exposure (CBS): "Seoul Mates" – Diane Frolov and Andrew Schneider; China Beach (ABC): "Hello-Goodbye" – Story by : John Sacret Young, John Wells, Lydia Woodward and Carol Flint Teleplay by : John Wells; I'll Fly Away (NBC): "Master Magician" – David Chase; Northern Exposure (CBS): "Burning Down the House" – Robin Green; Northern Exposure (CBS): "Democracy in America" – Jeff Melvoin |
| Outstanding Individual Achievement in Writing in a Variety or Music Program: The 64th Annual Academy Awards (ABC); In Living Color (Fox); Late Night with David Letterman (NBC); Saturday Night Live (NBC); The Tonight Show Starring Johnny Carson (NBC) | Outstanding Individual Achievement in Writing in a Miniseries or a Special: I'll Fly Away: "Pilot" (NBC) – Joshua Brand and John Falsey; Broadway Bound (ABC) – Neil Simon; Doing Time on Maple Drive (Fox) – James Duff; Miss Rose White (NBC) – Anna Sandor; Without Warning: The James Brady Story (HBO) – Robert Bolt |

== Most major nominations ==
Networks with multiple major nominations (Note: "Major" constitutes the categories listed above: Program, Acting, Directing, and Writing. Does not include the technical categories.)
| Network | No. of Nominations |
|---|---|
| NBC | 57 |
| CBS | 33 |
| ABC | 25 |

Programs with multiple major nominations
| Program | Category | Network | No. of Nominations |
|---|---|---|---|
| Northern Exposure | Drama | CBS | 9 |
| Murphy Brown | Comedy | CBS | 8 |
| Seinfeld | Comedy | NBC | 8 |
| Miss Rose White | Movie | NBC | 7 |
| Cheers | Comedy | NBC | 6 |
| I'll Fly Away | Drama | NBC | 6 |
| Broadway Bound | Movie | ABC | 5 |
| L.A. Law | Drama | NBC | 5 |
| China Beach | Drama | ABC | 4 |
| Law & Order | Drama | NBC | 4 |
| Quantum Leap | Drama | NBC | 4 |
| Roseanne | Comedy | ABC | 4 |
| The Tonight Show Starring Johnny Carson | Variety | NBC | 4 |
| The 64th Annual Academy Awards | Variety | ABC | 3 |
| Brooklyn Bridge | Comedy | CBS | 3 |
| Doing Time on Maple Drive | Movie | Fox | 3 |
| Evening Shade | Comedy | CBS | 3 |
| I'll Fly Away: Pilot | Movie | NBC | 3 |
| Late Night with David Letterman | Variety | NBC | 3 |
| The Trials of Rosie O'Neill | Drama | CBS | 3 |
| Unforgettable, with Love: Natalie Cole Sings the Songs of Nat King Cole | Variety | PBS | 3 |
| Without Warning: The James Brady Story | Movie | HBO | 3 |
| The Burden of Proof | Miniseries | ABC | 2 |
| Coach | Comedy | ABC | 2 |
| The Golden Girls | Comedy | NBC | 2 |
| Homefront: "Pilot" | Movie | ABC | 2 |
| In Living Color | Variety | Fox | 2 |
| Mrs. Cage | Movie | PBS | 2 |
| Road to Avonlea | Drama | Disney | 2 |
| Saturday Night Live | Variety | NBC | 2 |
| Wings | Comedy | NBC | 2 |

== Most major awards ==
Networks with multiple major awards
| Network | No. of Awards |
|---|---|
| NBC | 10 |
| CBS | 8 |
| ABC | 5 |
| HBO | 2 |

Programs with multiple major awards
| Program | Category | Network | No. of Awards |
|---|---|---|---|
| Miss Rose White | Movie | NBC | 3 |
| Murphy Brown | Comedy | CBS | 3 |
| Northern Exposure | Drama | CBS | 3 |
| The Tonight Show Starring Johnny Carson | Variety | NBC | 2 |
