= List of The White Shadow episodes =

This is a list of episodes for the CBS television series The White Shadow.

== Series overview ==
Season	Episodes	Originally released	
Season	Episodes	First released	Last released
1	15	November 27, 1978	April 9, 1979
2	24	September 17, 1979	April 1, 1980
3	15	October 16, 1980	March 16, 1981

== Episodes ==
=== Season 1 (1978–79) ===
No. overall	No. in season	Title	Directed by	Written by	Original release date
1	1	"Pilot"	Jackie Cooper	Bruce Paltrow	November 27, 1978
After finding his NBA career is over, Ken Reeves is offered a job as basketball coach at Carver High School by his old Boston College teammate, principal Jim Willis.
2	2	"Here's Mud in Your Eye"	Bruce Paltrow	Bruce Paltrow	December 4, 1978
Curtis Jackson has an alcohol problem, and Coach Reeves and the team must intervene to get him help.
3	3	"The Offer"	Bruce Paltrow	Marc Rubin	December 11, 1978
A sexy TV news reporter tries to lure Reeves into quitting at Carver and going into sportscasting.
4	4	"Bonus Baby"	Jackie Cooper	Robert De Laurentiis & William A. Schwartz	December 25, 1978
Coolidge is tempted by an agent to sign a pro contract, risking his eligibility for college ball.
5	5	"Pregnant Pause"	Jackie Cooper	Steven Bochco	January 1, 1979
Reese's college plans are derailed by a cheerleader girlfriend who claims to be pregnant, but Reeves thinks otherwise after seeing she has signed up for next year's squad.
6	6	"Wanna Bet?"	Jackie Cooper	Michael Kane	January 8, 1979
Reeves tries to talk a street basketball hustler named Bobby Magum into playing for him at Carver. Michael Warren guest stars.
7	7	"That Old Gang of Mine"	Bruce Paltrow	Gary Kott & Marc Rubin	January 15, 1979
After Reeves cuts Gomez off the team for poor grades, Gomez turns to his old street gang the Las Aztecas for support.
8	8	"One of the Boys"	Bruce Paltrow	John Falsey	January 27, 1979
Reeves deals with a transfer student named Raymond Collins, who left his prior school to escape rumors of being a homosexual. Peter Horton guest stars.
9	9	"Airball"	Jackie Cooper	Marc Rubin	February 3, 1979
Reeves tries to fly the team to an out-of-town tournament, and the results aren't what he bargained for.
10	10	"We're in the Money"	Mark Tinker	Mark Tinker	February 10, 1979
Reeves takes the team to Las Vegas for a tournament, with disastrous results.
11	11	"Spare the Rod"	Victor Lobl	Marc Rubin	February 17, 1979
Reeves deals with Lucius Robinson, a student with a past history of teacher violence. Brian Stokes Mitchell guest stars.
12	12	"The Great White Dope"	Michael Zinberg	John Falsey	February 24, 1979
Salami wants to be a professional boxer, but his father is dead-set against it. Robert Costanzo and Carlos Palomino guest star.
13	13	"Mainstream"	Victor Lobl	George Geiger	March 5, 1979
Reeves must deal with an autistic student who's been assigned to the team as part of the mainstreaming program.
14	14	"Little Orphan Abner"	Ernest Pintoff	John Falsey	March 26, 1979
Goldstein, the "outcast" of the Carver team, tries to turn to his teammates for support after his Jewish grandfather falls ill. Features cameo by Ernie Hudson
15	15	"LeGrand Finale"	Mark Tinker	Marc Rubin	April 9, 1979
The team wants to form a singing group, but elects not to include Thorpe, who's developed a dating interest in a white girl with an unsavory reputation.

=== Season 2 (1979–80) ===
No. overall	No. in season	Title	Directed by	Written by	Original release date
16	1	"On the Line"	Mark Tinker	Story by : Gary Kott; Teleplay by : Joshua Brand	September 17, 1979
A writer for Carver's school newspaper believes Jackson is involved with a sports bookie and shaving points at games. Ralph Wilcox (actor) guest stars.
17	2	"Albert Hodges"	Bruce Paltrow	Marc Rubin	September 24, 1979
A former student, back at Carver after an 18-month prison sentence, gets kicked off the basketball team and claims Reeves is a racist.
18	3	"The Cross-Town Hustle"	Mark Tinker	Steve Kline	October 1, 1979
A coach from a rival high school tries to convince Reese to transfer.
19	4	"Sudden Death"	Victor Lobl	Story by : Tom Chehak; Teleplay by : Joshua Brand	October 8, 1979
Reeves takes on a young freshman player and works him hard in practice with tragic results. Salami's cousin from Brooklyn, Nick Vitaglia, moves to California and struggles with the adjustment. Haywood Nelson, Hal Williams, and Madge Sinclair guest star.
20	5	"A Silent Cheer"	Victor Lobl	Steve Kline	October 15, 1979
Reeves gives a talented player who is deaf a shot on the Carver team. A scout from the Portland Trail Blazers visits Carver High.
21	6	"No Place Like Home"	Betty Goldberg	Marshall Herskovitz	October 29, 1979
Coolidge and Reeves become temporary roommates when Coolidge's apartment building where his family lives is destroyed by a fire.
22	7	"Globetrotters"	Bruce Paltrow	John Masius	November 5, 1979
The team's winning streak has gone to their heads, as evidenced by their showboating and cocky attitudes on and off the court. Reeves decides the team needs a full serving of humble pie when he asks a group of car wash workers to play his team in a scrimmage, who then embarrass the team with their tricks. After halftime, these men reveal they are the Harlem Globetrotters.
23	8	"Me?"	Thomas Carter	Sam Hefter	November 12, 1979
Thorpe finds out he has a venereal disease and that he has infected Coolidge's girlfriend with it as well. Cameo by Judyann Elder.
24	9	"Needle"	Victor Lobl	John Falsey	November 26, 1979
Hayward's young cousin runs afoul with a drug dealer and dies from an overdose. Reeves must prevent Hayward from seeking revenge.
25	10	"Sliding By"	Victor Lobl	Charles Eric Johnson	December 3, 1979
A "can't miss" college basketball prospect transfers to Carver to finish high school, but Reeves finds out he may not be what he seems.
26	11	"Delores, of Course"	Leon Carrere	Sam Hefter	December 18, 1979
Jackson reunites with his old girlfriend, unaware of her new line of work: prostitution. Debbi Morgan guest stars.
27	12	"A Christmas Present"	Betty Goldberg	Joshua Brand & John Falsey	December 25, 1979
Sybil is pregnant and at odds with her husband, while Reeves is left without any place to go for Christmas. Theodore Wilson guest stars.
28	13	"Feeling No Pain"	Victor Lobl	Story by : Michael Halperin; Teleplay by : Marc Rubin & John Falsey	January 1, 1980
Salami is prescribed amphetamines for a sprained knee, and the team cons him into sharing them before a game. Cameo by Julius Carry. Todd Susman and Andy Romano guest star.
29	14	"Artist"	LeRoy McDonald	Story by : Leroy Robinson; Teleplay by : Marc Rubin	January 8, 1980
An art teacher believes Thorpe has potential as an artist, but Thorpe has sights on the NBA. Gloria Foster, Hazel Medina, Herbert Jefferson Jr. guest star.
30	15	"Salami's Affair"	Thomas Carter	Story by : Tom Chehak; Teleplay by : Joshua Brand & David Assael	January 15, 1980
A young female teacher develops an attraction to Salami. The new science teacher harbors a crush on Reeves. Darlene Carr and Fran Myers guest star.
31	16	"Links"	Mark Tinker	John Masius & Mark Tinker	January 22, 1980
Reeves takes Salami, Thorpe and Coolidge to an exclusive country club for a round of golf with hilarious results. Robert Alda guest stars.
32	17	"The Stripper"	Victor Lobl	Story by : Steve Kline & Marc Rubin; Teleplay by : John Falsey	January 29, 1980
Reeves is unaware that the teacher he is dating moonlights as a stripper. Robert Costanzo guest stars.
33	18	"Gonna Fly Now"	Mark Tinker	Steve Kline	February 5, 1980
A drug dealer infiltrates Carver's campus. Kathleen Lloyd guest stars.
34	19	"Out at Home"	Victor Lobl	Story by : Marc Rubin; Teleplay by : Barry Gold	February 19, 1980
Reeves is named Carver's new athletic director, but the longtime baseball coach isn't happy about it. James McEachin and Beverly Hope Atkinson guest star. Cameos by Meshach Taylor and Arnold Johnson (actor).
35	20	"The Russians Are Coming"	Victor Lobl	Story by : Robert DiPietro; Teleplay by : Joshua Brand & David Assael	February 26, 1980
A touring team of Russian players comes to Carver, and one wants to defect with Hayward's help.
36	21	"The Hitter"	Marc Norman	Tom DeMartini	March 4, 1980
Gomez is being physically abused by his father, but won't admit it.
37	22	"The Death of Me Yet"	Victor Lobl	Marc Rubin	March 11, 1980
Carver celebrates advancing to the city championship, but the party turns tragic. Reeves is offered a job at a nearby college.
38	23	"Coolidge Goes Hollywood"	Marc Norman	Story by : Roland Wolpert & Marc Rubin & John Falsey; Teleplay by : Marc Rubin & John Falsey	March 18, 1980
Coolidge is offered a television acting role.
39	24	"A Few Good Men"	Thomas Carter	Teleplay by : John Falsey & Joshua Brand; Television story by : John Falsey & Joshua Brand; Suggested by a story by : Joan Pringle & Theodore Wilson	April 1, 1980
Graduation for some of the players brings angst over the future, especially for Reese and Goldstein. Kathy wants Reeves to travel to Greece with her during summer break.

=== Season 3 (1980–81) ===
No. overall	No. in season	Title	Directed by	Written by	Original release date
40	1	"Reunion: Part 1"	Bruce Paltrow	John Falsey	October 16, 1980
Reeves returns to New York City (Bayside Queens) for his high-school reunion. Willis takes a new job in Oakland, with Sybil being promoted as the new principal of Carver High.
41	2	"Reunion: Part 2"	Bruce Paltrow	Joshua Brand & John Falsey	October 23, 1980
Reeves finds out his father is dying and stays in New York City a while longer, then returns to Carver. Basketball tryouts at Carver bring a number of new faces to the team. Mickey Mantle guest stars.
42	3	"Georgia on My Mind"	Victor Lobl	Marc Rubin	October 30, 1980
Coolidge has been overwhelmed by school, in particular struggling with science class, so he figures he should forget academics and parlay his basketball abilities into trying out for the Harlem Globetrotters. He rethinks his strategy after getting buffaloed at tryouts, and the Globetrotters encourage Coolidge to finish the science course when they reveal they all are college graduates. First of three appearances of Roosevelt Grier as wrestling coach Ezra Davis.
43	4	"If Your Number's Up, Get It Down"	Mark Tinker	Joshua Brand	December 16, 1980
Coolidge, Salami, Vitaglia, and Thorpe wreck the new driver's ed car and have to raise money for a mobile health-care unit as punishment. Reeves needs to find a new place to live, as his apartment is being converted into a condominium. Numerous NBA legends guest star in this episode, including Elgin Baylor, Red Auerbach and Chet Walker. Roosevelt Grier guest stars.
44	5	"Christmas Story"	Victor Lobl	Joshua Brand & John Falsey	December 23, 1980
Thorpe befriends a young orphan while helping coach basketball at a Catholic school. Reeves tries to get romantic with the school's female coach, unaware she's a nun. The team tries to make some Christmas cash by selling undersized Christmas trees.
45	6	"No Blood, No Foul"	Thomas Carter	Joshua Brand	December 30, 1980
Salami faces jail time for breaking an opposing player's jaw during an on-court brawl.
46	7	"Vanity Fare"	Mark Tinker	John Masius & Mark Tinker	January 6, 1981
The team attempts to enter a singing contest. Reeves does a commercial for a local car dealership.
47	8	"Mister Hero"	Marc Norman	Marshall Herskovitz	January 13, 1981
While out joyriding in a stolen car, Stone rescues an elderly lady from a car fire and is lauded as a hero until the truth is found out.
48	9	"B.M.O.C."	LeRoy McDonald	Steve Kline	February 2, 1981
Coolidge begins to feel conscious about his size and height. NBA great Bill Russell guest stars.
49	10	"Trial and Error"	Victor Lobl	Marc Rubin	February 9, 1981 (Note: This episode was originally scheduled to air on January 20, 1981, but was preempted due to news coverage of the return of former American hostages in Iran.)
Falahey's girlfriend thinks she's pregnant, while Reeves is called for jury duty. Last appearance of Roosevelt Grier.
50	11	"Car Repo"	Mark Tinker	Story by : Joshua Brand & Denis Belair; Teleplay by : Joshua Brand	February 16, 1981
Salami and Vitaglia take a part-time job repossessing cars, and the hard hours take their toll.
51	12	"Psyched Out"	Victor Lobl	Story by : Marc Rubin & Thomas G. Blomquist; Teleplay by : Joanne Pagliaro	February 23, 1981
A teacher with a past history of nervous breakdowns is tormented by a psychotic student.
52	13	"Cops"	Lawrence Levy	Story by : Erwin Washington; Teleplay by : David Assael & Erwin Washington	March 2, 1981
Thorpe is shot by a cop.
53	14	"Burnout"	Mark Tinker	Story by : Dennis Danziger; Teleplay by : Dennis Danziger & Eric Stunzi	March 9, 1981
Carver's history teacher begins to show signs of burnout, much to the dismay of Rutherford.
54	15	"A Day in the Life"	Victor Lobl	Joshua Brand	March 16, 1981
A Carver alumni exhibition game brings updates on Hayward, Reese, Gomez, and Goldstein since graduation.
