= Going to Extremes (American TV series) =

American drama television series

- Genre: Drama
- Created by: Joshua Brand; John Falsey; Frank South
- Starring: Erika Alexander; June Chadwick; Roy Dotrice; Camilo Gallardo; Joanna Going; Daniel Jenkins; Charles Keating; Andrew Lauer; Carl Lumbly; Robert Duncan McNeill
- Composer: Jay Ferguson
- Country of origin: United States
- Original language: English
- No. of seasons: 1
- No. of episodes: 17

Production
- Executive producers: Joshua Brand; John Falsey
- Producer: Greg Prange
- Running time: 42 minutes
- Production companies: Brand/Falsey Productions; Lorimar Television

Original release
- Network: ABC
- Release: September 1, 1992 – January 27, 1993

Going to Extremes is an American drama television series created by Joshua Brand, John Falsey and Frank South. The series stars Erika Alexander, June Chadwick, Roy Dotrice, Camilo Gallardo, Joanna Going, Daniel Jenkins, Charles Keating, Andrew Lauer, Carl Lumbly and Robert Duncan McNeill. The series aired on ABC from September 1, 1992, to January 27, 1993.

== Premise ==
A British American medical doctor and inventor uses his fortune to set up a Caribbean Medical School Croft University School of Medicine on the island of St. Jantique.

== Cast ==
- Erika Alexander as Cheryl Carter
- June Chadwick as Dr. Alice Davis
- Roy Dotrice as Dr. Henry Croft
- Camilo Gallardo as Kim Selby
- Joanna Going as Kathleen McDermott
- Daniel Jenkins as Alex Loren
- Charles Keating as Dr. Jack Van DeWeghe
- Andrew Lauer as Charlie Moran
- Carl Lumbly as Dr. Michael Norris
- Robert Duncan McNeill as Colin Mitford

== Episodes ==
No.	Title	Directed by	Written by	Original release date
1	"Pilot"	Eric Laneuville	Story by : Joshua Brand & John Falsey & Frank South; Teleplay by : Frank South	September 1, 1992
2	"When Lovers Leap"	Joe Napolitano	Unknown	September 8, 1992
3	"Trials and Tribulations"	Michael Lange	Mark Levin	September 15, 1992
4	"De Heart of De Matter"	Michael Katleman	Douglas Steinberg	September 22, 1992
5	"Send in the Gloves"	Janet Greek	Tammy Ader & Jacqueline Zambrano	September 29, 1992
6	"A Mon Needs a Maid"	John David Coles	Mark Levin	October 6, 1992
7	"A Bridge Too Far"	Michael Katleman	Douglas Steinberg	October 13, 1992
8	"Human Races"	Jonathan Wacks	Mark Levin	October 20, 1992
9	"The Eye of De Needle"	Janet Greek	Tammy Ader	October 27, 1992
10	"Perpetual Care"	Joe Napolitano	Joshua Brand	November 10, 1992
11	"The Healing Arts"	Michael Katleman	Mark Levin	November 17, 1992
12	"Sexual Perversity in Jantique"	Greg Prange	Tammy Ader	December 1, 1992
13	"A Caribbean Christmas"	Nick Marck	Douglas Steinberg	December 15, 1992
14	"My Life as a Goat"	Unknown	Unknown	January 5, 1993
15	"Cinema Jantique"	Michael Katleman	Mark Levin	January 13, 1993
16	"Body Language"	Unknown	Unknown	January 20, 1993
17	"Bridesmaid Revisited"	Unknown	Unknown	January 27, 1993
