= Golden Globe Award for Best Television Series – Drama =

American television award

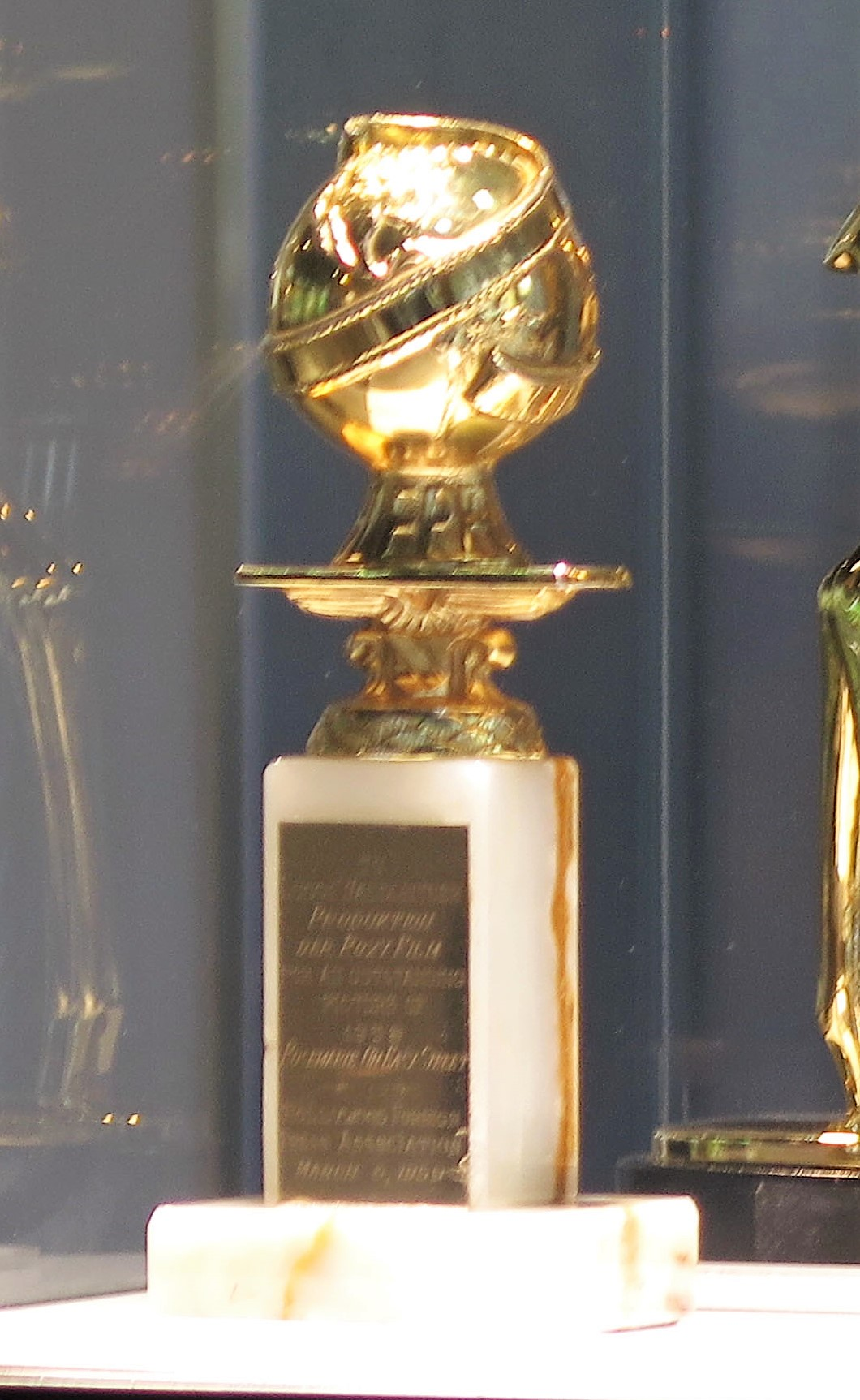
A Golden Globe.

The Golden Globe Award for Best Television Series – Drama is one of the annual Golden Globe Awards, given to the best drama television series. Documentary series and mini-series are also eligible for this award. From 1962 to 1968, the category was Golden Globe Award for Best Television Series, and grouped musical, comedy and drama series in a single category. After 1968, musical and comedy series were given their own category, the Golden Globe Award for Best Television Series – Musical or Comedy.

== 1960s ==
Year	Program	Network
Best Television Series
1961	My Three Sons	ABC
1961	What's My Line?	CBS
1962	Best Drama Series	
1962	The Defenders	CBS
1962	Best Television Program	
1962	The Dick Powell Show	NBC
Best Drama Series
1963	The Richard Boone Show	NBC
1963	Bonanza	NBC
1963	The Defenders	CBS
1963	The Eleventh Hour	NBC
1963	Rawhide	CBS
Best Television Series
1964	The Rogues	NBC
1964	12 O'Clock High	ABC
1964	The Munsters	CBS
1964	The Red Skelton Hour	CBS
1964	Wendy and Me	ABC
Best Television Program
1965	The Man from U.N.C.L.E.	NBC
1965	Frank Sinatra: A Man and His Music	NBC
1965	Get Smart	NBC
1965	I Spy	NBC
1965	My Name Is Barbra	CBS
Best Television Series
1966	I Spy	NBC
1966	The Fugitive	ABC
1966	The Man from U.N.C.L.E.	NBC
1966	Run For Your Life	NBC
1966	That Girl	ABC
1967	Mission: Impossible	CBS
1967	The Carol Burnett Show	CBS
1967	The Dean Martin Show	NBC
1967	Garrison's Gorillas	ABC
1967	Rowan & Martin's Laugh-In	NBC
1968	Rowan & Martin's Laugh-In	NBC
1968	The Carol Burnett Show	CBS
1968	The Doris Day Show	CBS
1968	Julia	NBC
1968	The Name of the Game	NBC
Best Drama Series
1969	Marcus Welby, M.D.	ABC
1969	Bracken's World	NBC
1969	The Mod Squad	ABC
1969	Mannix	CBS
1969	Room 222	ABC

== 1970s ==
Year	Program	Network
1970	Medical Center	CBS
1970	The Bold Ones: The Senator	NBC
1970	Marcus Welby, M.D.	ABC
1970	The Mod Squad	ABC
1970	The Young Lawyers	ABC
1971	Mannix	CBS
1971	Marcus Welby, M.D.	ABC
1971	Medical Center	CBS
1971	The Mod Squad	ABC
1971	O'Hara, U.S. Treasury	CBS
1972	Columbo	NBC
1972	America	BBC
1972	Mannix	CBS
1972	Medical Center	CBS
1972	The Waltons	CBS
1973	The Waltons	CBS
1973	Cannon	CBS
1973	Columbo	NBC
1973	Hawkins	CBS
1973	Mannix	CBS
1973	Police Story	NBC
1974	Upstairs, Downstairs	ITV
1974	Columbo	NBC
1974	Kojak	CBS
1974	Police Story	NBC
1974	The Streets of San Francisco	ABC
1974	The Waltons	CBS
1975	Kojak	CBS
1975	Baretta	ABC
1975	Columbo	NBC
1975	Petrocelli	NBC
1975	Police Story	NBC
1976	Rich Man, Poor Man	ABC
1976	Captains and the Kings	NBC
1976	Charlie's Angels	ABC
1976	Family	ABC
1976	Little House on the Prairie	NBC
1977	Roots	ABC
1977	Charlie's Angels	ABC
1977	Columbo	NBC
1977	Family	ABC
1977	Starsky and Hutch	ABC
1977	Upstairs, Downstairs	ITV
1978	60 Minutes (Note: Nomination refused by Don Hewitt)	CBS
1978	Battlestar Galactica	ABC
1978	Family	ABC
1978	Holocaust	NBC
1978	Lou Grant	CBS
1979	Lou Grant	CBS
1979	Backstairs at the White House	NBC
1979	Centennial	NBC
1979	Dallas	CBS
1979	The Rockford Files	NBC
1979	Roots: The Next Generations	ABC

== 1980s ==
Year	Program	Network
1980	Shōgun	NBC
1980	Dallas	CBS
1980	Hart to Hart	ABC
1980	Lou Grant	CBS
1980	Moviola	NBC
1980	Vega$	CBS
1981	Hill Street Blues	NBC
1981	Dallas	CBS
1981	Dynasty	ABC
1981	Hart to Hart	ABC
1981	Lou Grant	CBS
1982	Hill Street Blues	NBC
1982	Dallas	CBS
1982	Dynasty	ABC
1982	Hart to Hart	ABC
1982	Magnum, P.I.	CBS
1983	Dynasty	ABC
1983	Cagney & Lacey	CBS
1983	Dallas	CBS
1983	Hart to Hart	ABC
1983	Hill Street Blues	NBC
1984	Murder, She Wrote	CBS
1984	Cagney & Lacey	CBS
1984	Dynasty	ABC
1984	Hill Street Blues	NBC
1984	St. Elsewhere	NBC
1985	Murder, She Wrote	CBS
1985	Cagney & Lacey	CBS
1985	Dynasty	ABC
1985	Miami Vice	NBC
1985	St. Elsewhere	NBC
1986	L.A. Law	NBC
1986	Cagney & Lacey	CBS
1986	Dynasty	ABC
1986	Miami Vice	NBC
1986	Murder, She Wrote	CBS
1986	St. Elsewhere	NBC
1987	L.A. Law	NBC
1987	Beauty and the Beast	CBS
1987	Murder, She Wrote	CBS
1987	St. Elsewhere	NBC
1987	thirtysomething	ABC
1987	A Year in the Life	NBC
1988	thirtysomething	ABC
1988	Beauty and the Beast	CBS
1988	L.A. Law	NBC
1988	Murder, She Wrote	CBS
1988	Wiseguy	CBS
1989	China Beach	ABC
1989	In the Heat of the Night	NBC
1989	L.A. Law	NBC
1989	Murder, She Wrote	CBS
1989	thirtysomething	ABC
1989	Wiseguy	CBS

== 1990s ==
Year	Program	Network
1990	Twin Peaks	ABC
1990	China Beach	ABC
1990	In the Heat of the Night	NBC
1990	L.A. Law	NBC
1990	thirtysomething	ABC
1991	Northern Exposure	CBS
1991	Beverly Hills, 90210	Fox
1991	I'll Fly Away	NBC
1991	L.A. Law	NBC
1991	Law & Order	NBC
1992	Northern Exposure	CBS
1992	Beverly Hills, 90210	Fox
1992	Homefront	ABC
1992	I'll Fly Away	NBC
1992	Sisters	NBC
1993	NYPD Blue	ABC
1993	Dr. Quinn, Medicine Woman	CBS
1993	Law & Order	NBC
1993	Northern Exposure	CBS
1993	Picket Fences	CBS
1993	The Young Indiana Jones Chronicles	ABC
1994	The X-Files	Fox
1994	Chicago Hope	CBS
1994	ER	NBC
1994	NYPD Blue	ABC
1994	Picket Fences	CBS
1995	Party of Five	Fox
1995	Chicago Hope	CBS
1995	ER	NBC
1995	Murder One	ABC
1995	NYPD Blue	ABC
1996	The X-Files	Fox
1996	Chicago Hope	CBS
1996	ER	NBC
1996	NYPD Blue	ABC
1996	Party of Five	Fox
1997	The X-Files	Fox
1997	Chicago Hope	CBS
1997	ER	NBC
1997	Law & Order	NBC
1997	NYPD Blue	ABC
1998	The Practice	ABC
1998	ER	NBC
1998	Felicity	The WB
1998	Law & Order	NBC
1998	The X-Files	Fox
1999	The Sopranos	HBO
1999	ER	NBC
1999	Once and Again	ABC
1999	The Practice	ABC
1999	The West Wing	NBC

== 2000s ==
Year	Program	Network
2000	The West Wing	NBC
2000	CSI: Crime Scene Investigation	CBS
2000	ER	NBC
2000	The Practice	ABC
2000	The Sopranos	HBO
2001	Six Feet Under	HBO
2001	24	Fox
2001	Alias	ABC
2001	CSI: Crime Scene Investigation	CBS
2001	The Sopranos	HBO
2001	The West Wing	NBC
2002	The Shield	FX
2002	24	Fox
2002	Six Feet Under	HBO
2002	The Sopranos	HBO
2002	The West Wing	NBC
2003	24	Fox
2003	CSI: Crime Scene Investigation	CBS
2003	Nip/Tuck	FX
2003	Six Feet Under	HBO
2003	The West Wing	NBC
2004	Nip/Tuck	FX
2004	24	Fox
2004	Deadwood	HBO
2004	Lost	ABC
2004	The Sopranos	HBO
2005	Lost	ABC
2005	Commander in Chief	ABC
2005	Grey's Anatomy	ABC
2005	Prison Break	Fox
2005	Rome	HBO
2006	Grey's Anatomy	ABC
2006	24	Fox
2006	Big Love	HBO
2006	Heroes	NBC
2006	Lost	ABC
2007	Mad Men	AMC
2007	Big Love	HBO
2007	Damages	FX
2007	Grey's Anatomy	ABC
2007	House	Fox
2007	The Tudors	Showtime
2008	Mad Men	AMC
2008	Dexter	Showtime
2008	House	Fox
2008	In Treatment	HBO
2008	True Blood	HBO
2009	Mad Men	AMC
2009	Big Love	HBO
2009	Dexter	Showtime
2009	House	Fox
2009	True Blood	HBO

== 2010s ==
Year	Program	Network
2010	Boardwalk Empire	HBO
2010	Dexter	Showtime
2010	The Good Wife	CBS
2010	Mad Men	AMC
2010	The Walking Dead	AMC
2011	Homeland	Showtime
2011	American Horror Story	FX
2011	Boardwalk Empire	HBO
2011	Boss	Starz
2011	Game of Thrones	HBO
2012	Homeland	Showtime
2012	Boardwalk Empire	HBO
2012	Breaking Bad	AMC
2012	Downton Abbey	PBS
2012	The Newsroom	HBO
2013	Breaking Bad	AMC
2013	Downton Abbey	PBS
2013	The Good Wife	CBS
2013	House of Cards	Netflix
2013	Masters of Sex	Showtime
2014	The Affair	Showtime
2014	Downton Abbey	PBS
2014	Game of Thrones	HBO
2014	The Good Wife	CBS
2014	House of Cards	Netflix
2015	Mr. Robot	USA
2015	Empire	Fox
2015	Game of Thrones	HBO
2015	Narcos	Netflix
2015	Outlander	Starz
2016	The Crown	Netflix
2016	Game of Thrones	HBO
2016	Stranger Things	Netflix
2016	This Is Us	NBC
2016	Westworld	HBO
2017	The Handmaid's Tale	Hulu
2017	The Crown	Netflix
2017	Game of Thrones	HBO
2017	Stranger Things	Netflix
2017	This Is Us	NBC
2018	The Americans	FX
2018	Bodyguard	BBC
2018	Homecoming	Amazon Prime Video
2018	Killing Eve	BBC America
2018	Pose	FX
2019	Succession	HBO
2019	Big Little Lies	HBO
2019	The Crown	Netflix
2019	Killing Eve	BBC America
2019	The Morning Show	Apple TV+

== 2020s ==
Year	Program	Network
2020	The Crown	Netflix
2020	Lovecraft Country	HBO
2020	The Mandalorian	Disney+
2020	Ozark	Netflix
2020	Ratched	Netflix
2021	Succession	HBO
2021	Lupin	Netflix
2021	The Morning Show	Apple TV+
2021	Pose	FX
2021	Squid Game	Netflix
2022	House of the Dragon	HBO
2022	Better Call Saul	AMC
2022	The Crown	Netflix
2022	Ozark	Netflix
2022	Severance	Apple TV+
2023	Succession	HBO
2023	1923	Paramount+
2023	The Crown	Netflix
2023	The Diplomat	Netflix
2023	The Last of Us	HBO
2023	The Morning Show	Apple TV+
2024	Shōgun	FX/Hulu
2024	The Day of the Jackal	Peacock
2024	The Diplomat	Netflix
2024	Mr. & Mrs. Smith	Amazon Prime Video
2024	Slow Horses	Apple TV+
2024	Squid Game	Netflix
2025	The Pitt	HBO Max
2025	The Diplomat	Netflix
2025	Pluribus	Apple TV+
2025	Severance	Apple TV+
2025	Slow Horses	Apple TV+
2025	The White Lotus	HBO

== Series with multiple wins ==
3 wins
- Mad Men
- Succession
- The X-Files

2 wins

- The Crown
- Hill Street Blues
- Homeland
- L.A. Law
- Murder, She Wrote
- Northern Exposure

== Series with multiple nominations ==
7 nominations

- ER

6 nominations

- The Crown
- Dynasty
- L.A. Law
- Murder, She Wrote

5 nominations

- 24
- Columbo
- Dallas
- Game of Thrones
- NYPD Blue
- The Sopranos
- The West Wing

4 nominations

- Cagney & Lacey
- Chicago Hope
- Hart to Hart
- Hill Street Blues
- Law & Order
- Lou Grant
- Mad Men
- Mannix
- St. Elsewhere
- thirtysomething
- The X-Files

3 nominations

- Big Love
- Boardwalk Empire
- CSI: Crime Scene Investigation
- Dexter
- The Diplomat
- Downton Abbey
- Family
- The Good Wife
- Grey's Anatomy
- House
- Lost
- Marcus Welby, M.D.
- Medical Center
- The Mod Squad
- The Morning Show
- Northern Exposure
- Police Story
- The Practice
- Six Feet Under
- Succession
- The Waltons

2 nominations

- Beauty and the Beast
- Beverly Hills, 90210
- Breaking Bad
- Charlie's Angels
- China Beach
- Homeland
- House of Cards
- I'll Fly Away
- In the Heat of the Night
- I Spy
- Kojak
- The Man from U.N.C.L.E.
- Miami Vice
- Nip/Tuck
- Ozark
- Party of Five
- Pose
- Severance
- Slow Horses
- Squid Game
- Stranger Things
- This Is Us
- True Blood
- Upstairs, Downstairs
- Wiseguy

== Total awards by network ==
- NBC – 13
- ABC – 11
- CBS – 11
- HBO/HBO Max – 8
- Fox – 5
- AMC – 4
- FX – 4
- Showtime – 3
- Netflix – 2
- Hulu – 2
- ITV – 1
- USA – 1

== See also ==
- Primetime Emmy Award for Outstanding Drama Series
- Screen Actors Guild Award for Outstanding Performance by an Ensemble in a Drama Series
- Critics' Choice Television Award for Best Drama Series
