= John David Coles =

American film and television director

John David Coles is an American director and producer.

Coles was nominated in 2015 for an Emmy and PGA Award for his work as an executive producer and director on House of Cards. He also has directing credits on the Showtime series Homeland, the Epix original series Berlin Station, 11/22/63 for Hulu, and Amazon’s Mad Dogs. His production company, Talking Wall Pictures, has focused on the development of feature and television projects after securing a first round of equity financing in 2019.

== Early life ==
Coles shot his first full length 16mm film at age 17 – an update of Casablanca (1942) re-imagined in a high school. While at Amherst College he directed a documentary about the school that was aired on PBS, and soon after was making short films for NBC’s Saturday Night Live and directing industrial films for AT&T and Pepsi-Cola.

== Career ==
Coles began his career as an editor on Francis Ford Coppola’s Rumble Fish (1983) and The Cotton Club (1984). His feature directorial debut and break into the indie scene came in 1989 with Signs of Life, which earned Coles the International Critics Prize at Deauville American Film Festival, France. He then directed Rising Son (1990) and Darrow (1991). In theater, Coles was a member of the Circle Rep Lab and an alumnus of Wynn Handman at the American Place Theater. His Off-Broadway credits include directing The Impostor (1986) as well as Johnny Suede (1987).

Coles began directing episodic television in the 90s on William Tell (1987), I’ll Fly Away (1991), and Going to Extremes (1992). Since then, his directing credits include Homeland (2015), Berlin Station (2016), 11/22/63 (2016), and Mad Dogs (2016). Other credits include Bates Motel (2014), Power (2014), Damages (2007), Justified (2011), Sex and the City (1999-2002), and The West Wing (2002-2003). Executive Producer credits include Thief (2006), Elementary (2013), Unforgettable (2012), 3 lbs. (2006), Law and Order: Criminal Intent (2012), New Amsterdam (2008), Wonderland (2000), and most recently, USA’s hit drama The Sinner (2018).

In 2015, Coles was nominated for an Emmy and PGA Award for his work as an executive producer and director on House of Cards (2015).

Coles continues to write and create dramas through Talking Wall Pictures, which produced the CBS drama Songs in Ordinary Time (2000) and co-created and executive produced the series Crash and Burn (2009). Talking Wall has developed projects with HBO, CBS, New Line, IFC, and Bravo and has worked with the writers, including Mike Weller (Hair), Doug Wright (Quills), Kate Robin (Six Feet Under) and Ann Peacock (Nights in Rodanthe).

== Personal life ==
Coles lives in New York with his wife Laura. He is a Sundance Director’s Lab Alumni and has taught at the Columbia University Graduate Film Program, NYU Tisch School of the Arts, and the School of Visual Arts.

== Directing credits ==
- Law & Order: Organized Crime (2021): episode 1.03 "Say Hello To My Little Friends"
- The Right Stuff (2020): episode 1.02 "Goodies"
- FBI: Most Wanted (2020): episode 1.12 "Ride or Die"
- The Sinner (2018): episodes 2.03 "Part III" and 2.08 "Part VIII"
- Mr. Mercedes (2017): episode 1.03 "Cloudy, With a Chance Of Mayhem"
- The Son (2017): episode 1.08 "Honey Hunt"
- Shots Fired (2017): episode 1.07 "Hour Seven: Content Of Their Character"
- Berlin Station (2016)
- Mad Dogs (2016)
- 11.22.63 (2016)
- Homeland (2015)
- House of Cards (2014): episodes 2.5 "Chapter 18," 2.6 "Chapter 19," 2.11 "Chapter 24," 3.1 "Chapter 27," and 3.2 "Chapter 28"
- Trump Unauthorized (2005) (TV)
- Grey's Anatomy (2005) TV Series: episode 1.05 "Shake Your Groove Thing"
- Desperate Housewives (2004) TV Series: episode 1.11 "Move On"
- Jack & Bobby (2004) TV Series: episode 1.06 "Valentino"
- Karen Sisco (2003) TV Series: episode 1.04 "Justice"
- Push, Nevada (2002) TV Series
- The American Embassy (2002) TV Series
- Law & Order: Criminal Intent (2001) TV Series: episode 1.10 "Enemy Within"
- The $treet (2000) TV Series
- Wonderland (2000) TV Series
- The West Wing (1999) TV Series: episodes 4.10 "Arctic Radar" and 4.21 "Life On Mars"
- Maximum Bob (1998) TV Series
- Sex and the City (1998) TV Series: episodes 2.06 "The Cheating Curve," 3.13 "Escape from New York,"3.14 "Sex and Another City," 5.03 "Luck Be An Old Lady," and 5.04 "Cover Girl"
- Nothing Sacred (1997) TV Series
- Feds (1997) TV Series
- New York News (1995) TV Series
- Friends at Last (1995) (TV)
- Against Her Will: The Carrie Buck Story (1994) (TV)
- Birdland (1994) TV Series
- Philly Heat (1994) TV Series
- The Good Fight (1992) (TV)
- I'll Fly Away (1991) TV Series
- Darrow (1991) (TV)
- Rising Son (1990/I) (TV)
- Northern Exposure (1990) TV Series
- Signs of Life (1989)
- Crossbow (1988) TV Series
- Hellfire (1983) short film
