= Morgan Stevens =

American actor (1951–2022)

- Born: October 16, 1951; Knoxville, Tennessee, U.S.
- Died: January 26, 2022 (aged 70); Los Angeles, California, U.S.
- Occupation: Actor
- Years active: 1970–1999
- Known for: Fame; A Year in the Life; Melrose Place; The Waltons

Morgan Stevens (October 16, 1951 – January 26, 2022) was an American actor, primarily seen on television.

== Biography ==
Stevens played Paul Northridge in one episode of The Waltons and in three reunion movies. In A Wedding on Walton's Mountain, the character of Northridge married Erin Walton (Mary Elizabeth McDonough), and he appeared in Mother's Day on Walton's Mountain and A Day for Thanks on Walton's Mountain. He was Sam Stadder (John-Boy's hospital roommate) in the Waiting episode S8 Ep 9.

Stevens portrayed teacher David Reardon in two seasons of Fame (1982–1984). He then played Jack Gardner in the miniseries and subsequent series A Year in the Life (1986–1988). In 1995, he appeared in seven episodes of Melrose Place as Nick Diamond.

Stevens made guest appearances on several television programs, including One Day at a Time, The Love Boat, Murder One, and Murder, She Wrote (in three episodes as three characters). His last role was as Principal Max Henson in a 1999 episode of Walker, Texas Ranger.

In 1989, his career was halted for a few years when Stevens was arrested on suspicion of DUI after a mild car accident (a blood test later cleared him), and he was severely beaten by the LAPD police while in custody. Stevens claimed that after 90 minutes of waiting in a jail cell, he refused to hand back the shirt that was given, which is when two jailers kicked and beat him over two dozen times. Stevens suffered a dislocated jaw, a fractured cheek and nerve damage. He later sued and an out-of-court settlement was reached with his lawyers stating that the LAPD was unwilling to risk the publicity of a trial in the wake of the Rodney King case.

== Death ==
On January 26, 2022, Stevens was found dead at his home in Los Angeles at the age of 70. Police were there to perform a wellness check after friends reported that they had not heard from him in several days. The coroner later ruled he died of arteriosclerotic cardiovascular disease. Morgan was cremated, and the ashes were scattered at sea.
