= Signs of Life (1989 film) =

1989 film by John David Coles

- Directed by: John David Coles
- Written by: Mark Malone
- Produced by: Cary Brokaw; Lindsay Law; Andrew Reichsman; Marcus Viscidi
- Starring: Beau Bridges; Vincent D'Onofrio; Arthur Kennedy
- Cinematography: Elliot Davis
- Edited by: William A. Anderson; Angelo Corrao
- Music by: Howard Shore
- Distributed by: Avenue Pictures
- Release date: May 5, 1989
- Running time: 95 minutes
- Country: United States
- Language: English
- Box office: $96,000 (domestic)

Signs of Life, also known as One for Sorrow, Two for Joy, is a film by American director John David Coles, released May 5, 1989. It stars Beau Bridges, Vincent D'Onofrio, and Arthur Kennedy (in his last film appearance). Kathy Bates, Mary-Louise Parker (in her film debut), Will Patton, and Kate Reid also are featured.

== Plot ==
Signs of Life is the story of a Maine man who is losing his boat and his business.

== Cast ==
- Beau Bridges as John Alder
- Vincent D'Onofrio as Daryl Monahan (as Vincent Phillip D'Onofrio)
- Arthur Kennedy as Owen Coughlin
- Kevin J. O'Connor as Eddie Johnson
- Will Patton as Owen's Dad
- Kate Reid as Mrs. Wrangway
- Georgia Engel as Betty
- Kathy Bates as Mary Beth Alder
- Mary-Louise Parker as Charlotte

== Production ==
Signs of Life was filmed entirely in various small-town locations in Maine, except for one underwater sequence, which was filmed at the Mystic Marine Aquarium in Mystic, Connecticut.

== Reception ==
The film earned director Coles a Deauville Film Festival award, but was a financial loss.
