= Charles Keating (actor) =

English actor (1941–2014)

- Born: 22 October 1941; London, England
- Died: 8 August 2014 (aged 72); Weston, Connecticut, U.S.
- Occupation: Actor
- Spouse: Mary Keating (m. 1963)
- Children: 2

Charles Keating (22 October 1941 – 8 August 2014) was an English actor.

== Background ==
Keating was born on 22 October 1941 in London to Roman Catholic parents who had emigrated from Ireland, Charles James Keating and Margaret (née Shevlin) Keating.

Keating moved to the United States via Canada with his family as a teenager. He was working as a hairdresser in Buffalo, New York, when a customer suggested he try out for a local play, and he made his stage debut in 1959 with the Buffalo Studio Theatre.

Keating found steady work with the Cleveland Play House repertory company and was on tour when he met his future wife, actress Mary Chobody. The two were married in 1964 while Keating was serving in the United States Army and directing plays for its entertainment division at Fort Sill in Oklahoma. Keating later acted at the Charles Playhouse in Boston before eventually joining the Guthrie Theatre in Minneapolis. In 1971, Tyrone Guthrie asked him to move back to England and open the Crucible Theatre in Sheffield.

== UK career ==
Keating appeared with the Royal Shakespeare Company at Stratford-upon-Avon before turning to television (he was in the pilot episode of the long-running ITV series Crown Court in 1972), winning the roles of Ernest Simpson in Edward & Mrs. Simpson and Rex Mottram in ITV's Brideshead Revisited. In 1978 on the BBC Shakespeare series, he played the role of Rutland, Duke of Aumerle, in Richard II.

== US career ==
=== Television/soap operas ===
Keating is best known for his role as Carl Hutchins in the American soap opera Another World from 1983 to 1985, and again from 1991 to 1998 with a final appearance in 1999. He also played Charles in the satirical miniseries Fresno in 1986, which parodied the prime-time soaps of the day such as Dynasty and Dallas.

After Another World ended its run, he returned to stage acting and Shakespeare in a two-person show with former Another World co-star Victoria Wyndham.

During 2001 and 2002, Keating played the part of James Richfield in Port Charles.

Between stints on Another World, he played Dr. Damon Lazarre on All My Children, and Niles Mason on As the World Turns. He also had a role as a professor at a Caribbean medical school that catered to Americans in the short-lived ABC sitcom Going to Extremes as well as a guest role on Sex and the City.

=== Feature films ===
In 1992, he appeared as Klingman in The Bodyguard. In 1999, he appeared as Friedrich Golchan in “The Thomas Crown Affair”. In 2005, he played the role of Gian-Carlo in Deuce Bigalow: European Gigolo.

=== Theatre ===
Broadway roles include Loot by Joe Orton (1986), for which he was nominated for a Tony Award for Best Featured Actor in a Play, The Resistible Rise of Arturo Ui (1968) and The House of Atreus (1968), which comprised three classics: Agamemnon, Choephori, and Eumenides. In 1999 and 2000, he played the role of Malvolio in the Guthrie Theater productions of Twelfth Night in both years.

In 2001, he played the role of Carney/Oscar Wilde in the Lincoln Center performance of A Man of No Importance. In 2004, he played Ebenezer Scrooge in the Guthrie Theater production of A Christmas Carol. In 2007, he played the role of Clement O'Donnell in the Guthrie Theater production of Brian Friel's The Home Place.

== Awards ==
At the 23rd Daytime Emmy Awards, Keating won the 1996 Daytime Emmy Award for Outstanding Lead Actor in a Drama Series for his performance in the role of Carl Hutchins on Another World.

== Death ==
Keating died of lung cancer at the age of 72 on 8 August 2014 in Weston, Connecticut. He was survived by his wife, Mary, and the couple's two sons.

== Filmography ==
=== Film ===
Charles Keating film credits
Year	Title	Role	Notes
1983	Funny Money	Ferguson	
1990	Awakenings	Mr. Kean	
1992	The Bodyguard	Klingman	
1999	The Thomas Crown Affair	Friedrich Golchan	
1999	Harlem Aria	Professor	
2005	Deuce Bigalow: European Gigolo	Gian-Carlo	
2015	Angelica	Dr. Miles	(final film role)

=== Television ===
Charles Keating television credits
Year	Title	Role	Notes
1972	Crown Court	James Elliot QC	Series regular
1975	Private Affairs	Ernest Hemingway	
1976	Life and Death of Penelope	Nigel Priestman	4 episodes
1977	Supernatural	Andras	2 episodes
1978	Edward & Mrs. Simpson	Ernest Simpson	4 episodes
1981	Brideshead Revisited	Rex Mottram	6 episodes
1983	A Talent for Murder	Lawrence McClain	TV film
1983–1999	Another World	Carl Hutchins	Contract role
1985	Hotel	Llewelyn Forbes	Episode: "Second Offense"
1986	Fresno	Charles	6 episodes
1987	Miami Vice	Marty Glickberg	Episode: "Everybody's in Show Biz"
1987	CBS Summer Playhouse	John J. Stewart	
1987	All My Children	Damon Lazarre	
1987	The Equalizer	Kenneth Whitten	Episode: "Hand and Glove"
1988	The Equalizer	Vincent Brennard	Episode: "Last Call"
1989	As the World Turns	Niles Mason	2 episodes
1995	Hercules: The Legendary Journeys	Zeus	1 episode
