= The White Shadow (TV series) =

American drama television series (1978–1981)

- DVD cover for the first season
- Genre: Drama
- Created by: Bruce Paltrow
- Written by: David Assael; Steven Bochco; Joshua Brand; Tom Chehak; John Falsey; Steve Kline; Gary Kott; John Masius; Bruce Paltrow; Marc Rubin
- Directed by: Thomas Carter; Jackie Cooper; Lawrence Levy; Victor Lobl; Marc Norman; Bruce Paltrow; Mark Tinker; Virgil W. Vogel
- Starring: Ken Howard
- Country of origin: United States
- Original language: English
- No. of seasons: 3
- No. of episodes: 54 (list of episodes)

Production
- Executive producer: Bruce Paltrow
- Producer: Mark Tinker
- Running time: 48 minutes
- Production companies: Company Four; MTM Enterprises

Original release
- Network: CBS
- Release: November 27, 1978 – March 16, 1981

The White Shadow is an American drama television series starring Ken Howard that ran on the CBS network from November 27, 1978, to March 16, 1981, about a white former professional basketball player who takes a job coaching basketball at an impoverished urban high school with a racially mixed basketball team. Although the lead actor Howard was white, the series broke new ground as the first television ensemble drama to feature a mostly African American cast, with Black actors playing the high school principal and vice-principal, the majority of the teenage basketball players, and other supporting roles. The White Shadow also dealt with controversial subject matter such as sexually transmitted disease and gay sexual orientation among high school students.

Although The White Shadow was not a big ratings hit which led to its cancellation after three seasons, it drew praise from critics and helped pave the way for later realistic dramas such as Hill Street Blues and My So-Called Life. It was the first series developed by executive producer Bruce Paltrow, who went on to create and produce the medical drama St. Elsewhere. The show also made popular TV stars of both Howard and Kevin Hooks, who portrayed high school basketball player Morris Thorpe. In the years since its cancellation, a number of journalists have praised the show and in some cases recalled being fans of the show as children or teenagers. In particular, sports columnist Bill Simmons has written about the show's strong influence on his life.

== Overview ==
Ken Howard plays Ken Reeves, a white professional basketball player who is forced to retire from the Chicago Bulls of the NBA due to knee injuries. Upon his retirement, Reeves reluctantly takes a job as the head basketball coach at the fictional Carver High School, a mostly black and Hispanic urban high school in South Central Los Angeles.

Carver's principal is Coach Reeves' former Boston College classmate Jim Willis (Jason Bernard in the pilot, and Ed Bernard — no relation to Jason, but his best friend in real life — for seasons 1 and 2). Sybil Buchanan (Joan Pringle) is the vice principal, who was against Reeves' hiring and frequently clashes with Reeves in the areas of discipline and education. In season 3, Willis is promoted to a position with the Oakland Board of Education and Buchanan becomes principal of Carver High.

The subject matter of episodes included illicit drug use, child abuse, sexually transmitted diseases, gambling, prostitution, sexual orientation, and physical and mental disabilities. However, the show often incorporated humor, such as a joke made by a character, even when dealing with serious subjects. Episodes often ended with an issue left unresolved, contrary to other TV shows where the characters' problems were resolved by the end of the episode.

== Cast ==
- Ken Howard as Coach Ken Reeves, a former NBA player, who has retired due to injuries despite still being young enough (in theory) to play.
- Jason Bernard as Principal Jim Willis, a former teammate of Reeves in college (pilot episode)
- Ed Bernard as Principal Jim Willis (seasons 1–2)
- Joan Pringle as Vice-Principal (later Principal) Sybil Buchanan
- Byron Stewart as Warren Coolidge
- Kevin Hooks as Morris Thorpe
- Timothy Van Patten as Mario "Salami" Pettrino
- Thomas Carter as James "Hollywood" Hayward (seasons 1–2, 3 episodes season 3)
- Nathan Cook as Milton Reese (seasons 1–2, 1 episode season 3)
- Erik Kilpatrick as Curtis "CJ" Jackson (seasons 1–2)
- Ira Angustain as Ricardo "Go-Go" Gomez (seasons 1–2, 1 episode season 3)
- Ken Michelman as Abner Goldstein (seasons 1–2, 1 episode season 3)
- Russell Philip Robinson as Team Manager Phil Jeffers (seasons 1–2)
- John Mengatti as Nick "New York" Vitaglia (seasons 2–3)
- Art Holliday as Eddie Franklin (season 3)
- Larry "Flash" Jenkins as Wardell Stone (season 3)
- John Laughlin as Paddy Falahey (season 3)
- Stoney Jackson as Jesse B. Mitchell (season 3)
- Wolfe Perry as Teddy Rutherford (season 3)

Stewart reprised the role of Warren Coolidge, from 1984–88, in the Paltrow-directed series St. Elsewhere. On episodes of St. Elsewhere, Coolidge could often be spotted wearing a Carver High School t-shirt, and he discusses how he had to give up basketball due to injury, later moving to Boston and taking a hospital orderly job at St. Eligius. Van Patten plays a character named Dean in a St. Elsewhere three episode story arc in 1985 – in the final episode for Dean, this causes some confusion for Coolidge, who calls out "Heyyy!! Salami!!" when he sees Dean on a St. Eligius elevator, to which Dean replies "You got the wrong guy, pal.", leaving Coolidge trying to plead his case with a confused "No - it's Warren." as the elevator doors close.

Hooks, Van Patten and Carter all later pursued careers as directors.

== Development ==
The concept for the show originated from Ken Howard's own experiences as a high school basketball star at Manhasset High School on Long Island. Howard was one of the few white basketball players at the school and the only white player in the starting lineup, and had been nicknamed "The White Shadow". According to Howard, there were few racial tensions at his own high school, which was also not located in a "ghetto", but the team encountered such tensions when they played elsewhere. Howard has said that the humor in The White Shadow was based on that of his former teammates, who were "really funny". After graduating from high school, Howard went on to be captain of the basketball team at Amherst College.

When Howard and Bruce Paltrow pitched the idea for a show about a white coach and a racially mixed basketball team, CBS initially wanted it to be a half-hour sitcom and avoid dealing with controversial material involving sex, drugs and crime. Howard later said that he and Paltrow were "not going to turn this into Welcome Back, Kotter". They persuaded the network to make it a one-hour drama series and furthermore allow the show to address realistic, controversial subjects, although humorous lines were often included. They also strove for realism in the basketball scenes.

The memorable funk instrumental theme song for the show was composed by Mike Post and Pete Carpenter. Although not released on record during the show's run, it later appeared on Post's albums Television Theme Songs (1982) and NYPD Blue: The Best of Mike Post (1999).

== Syndication ==
The program has intermittently been seen in syndication and on cable since ending its network run (including airing on ESPN Classic), and as of 2016, the show airs (intermittently) on the Heroes & Icons classic TV network. Decades also aired the show as part of the Decades Binge August 27–28, 2016, June 9–10, 2018. and March 20–21, 2021. Aired on TV Land in the late 1990s. It currently airs on MeTV+ at 9am central time.

== Home media ==
20th Century Fox Home Entertainment has released the first two seasons on DVD in Region 1.

== In popular culture ==
Saturday Night Live did a parody skit of the show titled The Black Shadow when NBA star Bill Russell hosted the show on November 3, 1979.

When aired in the 1980s in Turkey, the series gained a lot of interest and the then little-known sport of basketball attracted millions of youths.

In January 1984, the Beastie Boys played an unreleased song "Where's The White Shadow" on The Scott and Gary Show on the New York City public-access channel.

Aaron McGruder's animated series, The Boondocks, featured a character whom main character Huey Freeman called the White Shadow. He claimed to be a government agent sent to spy on Huey, but was only ever seen by Huey, causing Huey to believe he may just be a figment of his imagination. He only had two appearances, "The Real" and "It's Going Down".

In the Seinfeld episode "The Summer of George", George mentions the show while surfing channels at Jerry's apartment.

In an episode of the HBO series Winning Time: The Rise of the Lakers Dynasty, Magic Johnson (Quincy Isaiah) mentions he watches the show.

== See also ==
- List of The White Shadow episodes
- White savior § Appearance in television
