= I'll Fly Away (TV series) =

1991–1993 American drama television series

- Genre: Drama
- Created by: Joshua Brand; John Falsey
- Starring: Sam Waterston; Regina Taylor; Jeremy London; Jason London; Ashlee Levitch; John Aaron Bennett; Kathryn Harrold; Mary Alice; Peter Simmons; Bill Cobbs; Rae'Ven Larrymore Kelly
- Narrated by: Regina Taylor
- Theme music composer: W. G. Walden
- Country of origin: United States
- Original language: English
- No. of seasons: 2
- No. of episodes: 38 + TV film

Production
- Running time: 60 minutes
- Production companies: Brand-Falsey Productions; Lorimar Television

Original release
- Network: NBC (1991–1993); PBS (1993 TV film)
- Release: October 7, 1991 – February 5, 1993 (TV film: Oct. 11, 1993)

I'll Fly Away is an American television drama series that aired on NBC from October 7, 1991, to February 5, 1993. Set during the late 1950s and early 1960s, in an unspecified Southern U.S. state, it stars Regina Taylor as Lilly Harper, a Black housekeeper for the family of district attorney Forrest Bedford, played by Sam Waterston (the character's name is a twist on the name of Confederate Army General Nathan Bedford Forrest, an early leader of the Ku Klux Klan). As the show progresses, Lilly becomes increasingly involved in the Civil Rights Movement, which eventually pulls in her employer as well.

== Overview ==
I'll Fly Away won two 1992 Emmy Awards (Eric Laneuville for Outstanding Individual Achievement in Directing in a Drama Series for the episode "All God's Children", and for series creators Joshua Brand and John Falsey for Outstanding Individual Achievement in Writing in a Miniseries or a Special), and 23 nominations in total. It won three Humanitas Prizes, two Golden Globe Awards, two NAACP Image Awards for Outstanding Drama Series, and a Peabody Award. However, the series was never a ratings blockbuster, and it was cancelled by NBC in 1993, despite widespread protests by critics and viewer organizations.

After the program's cancellation, a two-hour film, I'll Fly Away: Then and Now, was produced, to resolve dangling storylines from season two, and provide the series with a true finale. The movie aired on October 11, 1993, on PBS. Its major storyline closely paralleled the true story of the 1955 murder of Emmett Till in Money, Mississippi. Thereafter, PBS began airing repeats of the original episodes through 1995. The series also aired on PAX.

The series takes its name from a Christian hymn written in 1929 by Albert E. Brumley.

In 1999, TV Guide ranked Lilly Harper number 15 on its list of 50 Greatest TV Characters of All Time. In 2013, it ranked the series #9 on their list of 60 shows that were "Cancelled Too Soon".

== Cast ==
Original cast

=== Regular cast ===
Actor	Character	Seasons		
Actor	Character	1	2	Then and Now
Sam Waterston	Forrest Bedford	Main	Main	Main
Regina Taylor	Lilly Harper	Main	Main	Main
Jeremy London	Nathaniel "Nathan" Bedford	Main	Main	
Jason London	Nathaniel "Nathan" Bedford			Main
Ashlee Levitch	Francie Bedford	Main	Main	Main
John Aaron Bennett	John Morgan Bedford	Main	Main	Main
Kathryn Harrold	Christina LeKatzis	Main	Main	
Peter Simmons	Paul Slocum	Recurring	Main	Main
Bill Cobbs	Lewis Coleman	Recurring	Recurring	Main
Rae'Ven Larrymore Kelly	Adlaine Harper	Recurring	Recurring	Recurring
Brad Sullivan	Coach Zollicofer Weed	Recurring	Recurring	

=== Recurring cast ===
- Mary Alice as Marguerite Peck
- Wayne Brady as Damon Rollins
- Roger Aaron Brown as Reverend Henry
- Cara Buono as Diane Lowe
- Vondie Curtis-Hall as Joe Clay and Howard Yearwood
- Michael Dolan as Francis Vawter
- Ed Grady as Judge Lake Stevens
- Dorian Harewood as Clarence "Cool Papa" Charleston
- Deborah Hedwall as Gwen Bedford
- Tommy Hollis as Oscar Wilson
- Rebecca Koon as Eileen Slocum
- Elizabeth Omilami as Joelyn
- Scott Paulin as Tucker Anderson
- Harold Perrineau as Robert Evans
- Amy Ryan as Parky Sasser
- Sonny Shroyer as Bobby Slocum
- N'Bushe Wright as Claudia Bishop

== Setting ==
The series takes place in the fictional town of Bryland, in fictional Bryland County.

The state in which Bryland is located is never specified. At various points, the District of Columbia and these Southern states were mentioned in ways that eliminate them as possible settings: Alabama, Arkansas, Florida, Maryland, Mississippi, North Carolina, Tennessee, Texas, and Virginia. Mentions of "counties" in the state eliminate Louisiana, which instead has parishes.

In "Freedom Bus", Forrest Bedford is described as a new U.S. Attorney "in the Fifth District", presumably a reference to the Fifth Judicial Circuit of the federal court system. In the late 1950s and early 1960s, the Fifth Circuit comprised Alabama, Florida, Louisiana, Mississippi, Texas, Georgia, and the Panama Canal Zone. Because the first five states listed can be eliminated on the basis of statements made by characters throughout the series, the likeliest setting for the series is Georgia.

== Episodes ==
=== Season 1 (1991–1992) ===
No. overall	No. in season	Title	Directed by	Written by	Original release date
1	1	"Pilot"	Joshua Brand	Joshua Brand & John Falsey	October 7, 1991
Lilly is hired as the Bedfords' housekeeper as Forrest prosecutes a white man for a bus accident that killed three black people and John Morgan deals with his mother being in the hospital.
2	2	"The Hat"	John David Coles	David Chase	October 8, 1991
John Morgan's lost cowboy hat is found by Adlaine, while Forrest deals with verbal assault in a beating case arising from the demonstration.
3	3	"Rules of the Game"	Jack Bender	Barbara Hall	October 15, 1991
Francie faces womanhood while Forrest is on a hunting trip and John Morgan grows worried over an errant arrow.
4	4	"Amazing Grace"	Kevin Rodney Sullivan	Henry Bromell	October 22, 1991
Forrest joins the race for attorney general while Lilly considers going to a voting-rights meeting and Francie has writer's block.
5	5	"All God's Children"	Eric Laneuville	Judi Ann Mason	October 29, 1991
John Morgan is disappointed at not being invited to Lilly's party, while Forrest comes to realize that running for office will not be so easy.
6	6	"Beyond Here Dar Be Dragons"	Eugene Corr	Josef Anderson	November 5, 1991
Christina and John Morgan are each haunted by the memories of the Ku Klux Klan.
7	7	"Parallel Lives"	Michael Fresco	Stuart Stevens	November 19, 1991
Slocum and Evans clash over the brick-throwing incident, while Lewis wishes to relive his time in the Negro leagues.
8	8	"Coming Home"	Mark Sobel	Kevin Arkadie	November 26, 1991
The Bedfords are propelled into conflict at Thanksgiving when Gwen visits and Lilly's brother returns from the North.
9	9	"Some Desperate Glory"	Ian Sander	Barbara Hall	December 10, 1991
Nathan and Slocum compete in a game of chicken, while Francie turns to Lilly for help in singing at the church benefit.
10	10	"Desire"	Aaron Lipstadt	Henry Bromell and Judi Ann Mason	December 17, 1991
As Lilly plans to divorce her husband, Nathan comes into conflict with a carnival worker and Forrest makes things for him worse when he arrests an upstanding citizen in the McDaniel murder case.
11	11	"Alice Oakley Doesn't Live Here Anymore"	Jack Bender	Josef Anderson	January 7, 1992
John Morgan makes up a story about his mother joining the rodeo, while Forrest finds a witness and Slocum's father kicks him out of the house.
12	12	"On the Road"	Barbara Amato	Frank Dandrolf	February 28, 1992
Forrest lobbies for Francie's affections on his campaign trail, while Lilly tries registering to vote.
13	13	"Master Magician"	Eric Laneuville	David Chase	March 6, 1992
John Morgan plans a postvictory magic show for Forrest, while Lilly considers the possibility that the gains earned by casting a vote could just be an illusion.
14	14	"Hard Lessons"	Jack Bender	Barbara Hall	March 13, 1992
The townspeople decide to teach Forrest a lesson, while Nathan wants to know the reason behind Forrest and Lake's falling-out.
15	15	"Cool Winter Blues"	Joe Napolitano	Judi Ann Mason	March 20, 1992
As the demonstration gets serious due to an impromptu protest, Lilly betrays John Morgan and Nathan discovers a stunning truth about his girlfriend.
16	16	"The Way Things Are"	Roy Campanella II	Henry Bromell	March 27, 1992
As Lilly takes action due to Rev. Henry's latest protest, Nathan and Diane's status as a couple creates rather harsh comments and John Morgan fiddles with electricity.
17	17	"Slow Dark Coming"	Michael Fresco	Karen Hall	April 3, 1992
Diane's parents try to end her relationship with Nathan, while racial tensions rise with the department store boycott.
18	18	"Toy Soldiers"	Michael Katleman	Marc Rubin	April 10, 1992
As Lilly and Forrest witness police officers assaulting black children, Tucker sets his sights on a campaign worker.
19	19	"The Kindness of Strangers"	Bruce Seth Green	Barbara Hall and Henry Bromell	April 24, 1992
Forrest wants someone to pay for his incompetent opponent in a murder trial, while Lilly falls for a saxophone player and is glad to see Zollicofer.
20	20	"Not Buried"	David Chase	David Chase	May 1, 1992
As John Morgan tries to ease his guilt over the passing of an elderly neighbor, Forrest asks Christina to defend a black man accused of murder.
21	21	"A Dangerous Comfort"	Michael Fresco	Barbara Hall and Henry Bromell	May 15, 1992
A triangle develops between Lilly, Clarence and Lewis, while Christina faces her demons in helping Tucker face his.
22	22	"The Slightest Distance"	Ian Sander	Paul Margolis	May 15, 1992
As Lilly attempts to make peace between her father and Clarence, Nathan sees something he soon regrets.

=== Season 2 (1992–1993) ===
No. overall	No. in season	Title	Directed by	Written by	Original release date
23	1	"Hello and Goodbye"	Jack Bender	Barbara Hall	September 25, 1992
As Lilly tries to respond to Clarence's proposal, Forrest decides to accept the job of U.S. attorney, despite Nathan confronting him about his affair with Christina.
24	2	"Ruler of My Heart"	Michael Fresco	Kevin Arkadie	October 2, 1992
The FBI questions Lilly, while Forrest receives news that Gwen may be coming home and Francie throws a party.
25	3	"All in the Life"	Ian Sander	Henry Bromell	October 9, 1992
As Forrest is forced to tell his children the bad news about Gwen on his first day as U.S. attorney, Slocum learns that Parkie could be pregnant.
26	4	"Until Tomorrow"	Eric Laneuville	Henry Bromell	October 16, 1992
The Bedfords mourn a friend's death, while Lewis takes Adlaine to a meeting.
27	5	"Desperate Measures"	Allan Arkush	Barbara Hall	October 30, 1992
Rev. Henry convinces Forrest to get involved in the trial of the men accused of killing Col. Launders.
28	6	"Freedom Bus"	Michael Katleman	Rogers Turrentine	November 6, 1992
One of a group of visiting Freedom Riders stays with Lilly, while Nathan takes his driving test.
29	7	"Eighteen"	David Chase	David Chase	November 13, 1992
Slocum takes a trip to a brothel with Nathan before proposing to Parkie, while Lily asks Forrest for a raise.
30	8	"Fragile Truths"	Jack Bender	Karen Hall	November 20, 1992
Slocum seeks legal advice from Forrest when the police interrogate him and Lilly clashes with her cousin.
31	9	"Since Walter"	Sam Waterston	Lynn Siefert	November 27, 1992
Just as Frankie discovers there was a third man in Col. Landers' murder, Slocum's trial begins and Lilly's ex-husband arrives in town.
32	10	"The Third Man"	Kevin Hooks	Lonne Elder III	December 11, 1992
As Slocum's trial comes to an end, Lilly falls for a porter and Forrest faces the third man involved in the murder of Col. Landers.
33	11	"Comfort and Joy"	Scott Paulin	Barbara Hall	December 11, 1992
At Christmastime, Lilly is beaten by an opponent of the Freedom Riders, the Bedfords attend a Christmas party at Christina's and Slocum finds holiday cheer in a most unlikely place
34	12	"Realpolitik"	Allan Arkush	Henry Bromell and Kevin Arkadie	January 8, 1993
While Lilly becomes the leader of a boycott, Forrest debates dropping the Landers case as his relationship with Christina gets worse.
35	13	"Small Wishes"	Félix Enríquez Alcalá	Dee Johnson	January 15, 1993
Nathan gets arrested for possessing drugs, while the Landers trial comes to a close and John Morgan grows jealous of Lilly and Joe's relationship.
36	14	"What's in a Name?"	James A. Contner	Marjorie David	January 22, 1993
As Forrest finds himself being followed, Nathan starts to feel pressure over his relationship with Claudia and Lilly tries to get an old woman registered to vote.
37	15	"Commencement"	Jack Bender	Rogers Turrentine	January 29, 1993
Lilly tries to study for her high-school finals, while Forrest informs Christina he's being followed and a group of students set up a sit-in.
38	16	"State"	Ian Sander	Josef Anderson	February 5, 1993
Joe considers becoming a teacher for the new school, while Nathan unwillingly goes to a college interview arranged by Forrest.

== TV film ==
Title	Directed by	Written by	Original release date
"Then and Now"	Ian Sander	John Falsey	October 11, 1993
In 1993, Lilly tells her 12-year-old grandson about a terrible incident that occurred during her last days as the Bedfords' housekeeper.

== Awards and nominations ==
Year	Award	Category	Recipient	Result
1992	American Cinema Editors' Eddie Award	Best Edited Episode from a Television Series	David Rosenbloom and Karen I. Stern (For the pilot episode)	Nominated
1992	American Society of Cinematographers Award	Outstanding Achievement in Cinematography in Movies of the Week/Pilots	William Wages	Nominated
1993	American Television Awards	Best Dramatic Series		Won
1993	American Television Awards	Best Actor, Dramatic Series	Sam Waterston	Won
1993	American Television Awards	Best Actress, Dramatic Series	Regina Taylor	Won
1993	Casting Society of America's Artios Award	Best Casting for TV, Dramatic Episodic	Theodore S. Hann and Jay Binder	Nominated
1992	Directors Guild of America Award	Outstanding Directing – Drama Series	Eric Laneuville (For episode "All God's Children")	Won
1993	Directors Guild of America Award	Outstanding Directing – Drama Series	Roy Campanella II (For episode "The Way Things Are")	Nominated
1992	Golden Globe Award	Best Television Series – Drama		Nominated
1992	Golden Globe Award	Best Actor – Television Series Drama	Sam Waterston	Nominated
1993	Golden Globe Award	Best Television Series – Drama		Nominated
1993	Golden Globe Award	Best Actor – Television Series Drama	Sam Waterston	Won
1993	Golden Globe Award	Best Actress – Television Series Drama	Regina Taylor	Won
1992	Humanitas Prize	60 Minute Category	Henry Bromell	Won
1992	Humanitas Prize	60 Minute Category	Kevin Arkadie (For episode "Coming Home")	Nominated
1992	Humanitas Prize	90 Minute Category	Joshua Brand and John Falsey (For the pilot episode)	Won
1993	Motion Picture Sound Editors' Golden Reel Award	Best Sound Editing – Television Episodic – Effects & Foley	Mace Matiosian	Won
1994	NAACP Image Award	Outstanding Drama Series, Miniseries or Television Movie		Won
1994	NAACP Image Award	Outstanding Actor in a Drama Series, Miniseries or Television Movie	Dorian Harewood	Won
1995	NAACP Image Award	Outstanding Drama Series		Won
1995	NAACP Image Award	Outstanding Actress in a Drama Series	Regina Taylor	Won
1991	Peabody Award		Brand-Falsey Productions	Won
1992	Primetime Emmy Award	Outstanding Drama Series	Joshua Brand, David Chase, John Falsey, Barbara Hall, John Forrest Niss and Ian Sander	Nominated
1992	Primetime Emmy Award	Outstanding Made for Television Movie	Joshua Brand, John Falsey, John Forrest Niss and Ian Sander (For the pilot episode)	Nominated
1992	Primetime Emmy Award	Outstanding Lead Actor in a Drama Series	Sam Waterston	Nominated
1992	Primetime Emmy Award	Outstanding Lead Actress in a Drama Series	Regina Taylor	Nominated
1992	Primetime Emmy Award	Outstanding Supporting Actress in a Drama Series	Mary Alice	Nominated
1992	Primetime Emmy Award	Outstanding Writing for a Drama Series	David Chase (For episode "Master Magician")	Nominated
1992	Primetime Emmy Award	Outstanding Writing for a Miniseries, Movie or a Dramatic Special	Joshua Brand and John Falsey (For the pilot episode)	Won
1992	Primetime Emmy Award	Outstanding Directing for a Drama Series	Eric Laneuville (For episode "All God's Children")	Won
1992	Primetime Emmy Award	Outstanding Directing for a Miniseries, Movie or a Dramatic Special	Joshua Brand (For the pilot episode)	Nominated
1992	Primetime Emmy Award	Outstanding Main Title Theme Music	W.G. Snuffy Walden	Nominated
1992	Primetime Emmy Award	Outstanding Editing for a Miniseries or a Special – Single-Camera Production	David Rosenbloom and Karen I. Stern (For the pilot episode)	Nominated
1992	Primetime Emmy Award	Outstanding Costumes for a Series	Tom McKinley (For episode "The Slightest Distance")	Nominated
1992	Primetime Emmy Award	Outstanding Costumes for a Miniseries, Movie or a Special	Mina Mittelman (For the pilot episode)	Nominated
1992	Primetime Emmy Award	Outstanding Art Direction for a Miniseries or a Special	James Hulsey and Joseph Litsch (For the pilot episode)	Nominated
1992	Primetime Emmy Award	Outstanding Sound Editing for a Miniseries, Movie or a Special	Peter Austin, Peter Bergren, John Bonds, Joe Earle, Frank Fuller, Gary Gelfand, Michael Gutierrez, Jim Hebenstreit, H. Jay Levine, Albert Lord, Bruce Michaels, Brian Thomas Nist, Ralph Osborn, Allan K. Rosen, Matthew Sawelson, Adam Sawelson, Richard Taylor, Randal S. Thomas, Patty Von Arx and Dave Weathers (For the pilot episode)	Nominated
1993	Primetime Emmy Award	Outstanding Drama Series	Joshua Brand, Henry Bromell, David Chase, John Falsey, Barbara Hall, John Forrest Niss and Ian Sander	Nominated
1993	Primetime Emmy Award	Outstanding Lead Actor in a Drama Series	Sam Waterston	Nominated
1993	Primetime Emmy Award	Outstanding Lead Actress in a Drama Series	Regina Taylor	Nominated
1993	Primetime Emmy Award	Outstanding Supporting Actress in a Drama Series	Mary Alice	Won
1993	Primetime Emmy Award	Outstanding Directing for a Drama Series	Eric Laneuville (For episode "Until Tomorrow")	Nominated
1993	Primetime Emmy Award	Outstanding Guest Actress in a Drama Series	Rosanna Carter	Nominated
1993	Primetime Emmy Award	Outstanding Original Music and Lyrics	Stephen James Taylor (For song "State Until You Come Home")	Nominated
1993	Primetime Emmy Award	Outstanding Costumes for a Series	Tom McKinley (For episode "The Third Man")	Nominated
1994	Primetime Emmy Award	Outstanding Lead Actor in a Miniseries or a Movie	Sam Waterston (For special "I'll Fly Away: Then and Now")	Nominated
1994	Primetime Emmy Award	Outstanding Costumes for a Miniseries, Movie or a Special	Tom McKinley (For special "I'll Fly Away: Then and Now")	Nominated
1993	Producers Guild of America Award	Outstanding Producer of Television	David Chase and Ian Sander	Won
1992	Television Critics Association Award	Program of the Year		Nominated
1992	Television Critics Association Award	Outstanding Achievement in Drama		Won
1993	Television Critics Association Award	Outstanding Achievement in Drama		Won
1992	Viewers for Quality Television Award	Best Quality Drama Series		Won
1992	Viewers for Quality Television Award	Best Actor in a Quality Drama Series	Sam Waterston	Nominated
1992	Viewers for Quality Television Award	Best Actress in a Quality Drama Series	Regina Taylor	Won
1993	Viewers for Quality Television Award	Best Quality Drama Series		Won
1993	Viewers for Quality Television Award	Best Actor in a Quality Drama Series	Sam Waterston	Nominated
1993	Viewers for Quality Television Award	Best Actress in a Quality Drama Series	Regina Taylor	Won
1993	Writers Guild of America Award	Episodic Drama	Henry Bromell (For episode "Amazing Grace")	Won
1993	Writers Guild of America Award	Episodic Drama	Kevin Arkadie (For episode "Coming Home")	Nominated
1994	Writers Guild of America Award	Episodic Drama	Barbara Hall (For episode "Comfort and Joy")	Nominated
1992	Young Artist Award	Best Young Actress Starring in a New Television Series	Ashlee Levitch	Nominated
1992	Young Artist Award	Exceptional Performance by a Young Actor Under 10	John Aaron Bennett	Nominated
1993	Young Artist Award	Best Young Actor Starring in a Television Series	Jeremy London	Won
1993	Young Artist Award	Best Young Actress Starring in a Television Series	Ashlee Levitch	Won
1993	Young Artist Award	Outstanding Actor Under 10 in a Television Series	John Aaron Bennett	Won
1993	Young Artist Award	Outstanding Actress Under 10 in a Television Series	Rae'Ven Larrymore Kelly	Won
1994	Young Artist Award	Best Youth Actress Leading Role in a Television Series	Rae'Ven Larrymore Kelly	Won

== See also ==
- Any Day Now
- Civil rights movement in popular culture
