= A Year in the Life =

1980s American television series

- Genre: Drama
- Created by: Joshua Brand; John Falsey
- Developed by: Stu Kreiger
- Starring: Richard Kiley; Jayne Atkinson; Adam Arkin; David Oliver; Sarah Jessica Parker; Amanda Peterson; Wendy Phillips; Morgan Stevens; Diana Muldaur
- Composer: David McHugh
- Country of origin: United States
- Original language: English
- No. of seasons: 1
- No. of episodes: 22 + miniseries

Production
- Running time: 60 minutes
- Production companies: Falahey/Austin Street Productions; Universal Television

Original release
- Network: NBC
- Release: December 15, 1986 – April 13, 1988

A Year in the Life is an American drama television series that began as a three-part miniseries which was first broadcast in December 1986 and later ran as a weekly series on NBC from September 16, 1987 to April 13, 1988. It was created by Joshua Brand and John Falsey, who had previously created the critically acclaimed series St. Elsewhere, also for NBC.

As suggested by the title, the miniseries followed the various members of the Gardner family of Seattle during the course of one year. The major event of that year was the sudden and unexpected death of wife and mother Ruth Gardner (Eva Marie Saint). Following the success of the miniseries, NBC decided to launch a one-hour drama series the following fall.

Richard Kiley played Joe Gardner, owner of a successful plastics business and father of four adult children. The children were twice-divorced daughter Anne (Wendy Phillips), who had returned home with her two teenaged children; daughter Lindley (Jayne Atkinson) and husband Jim (Adam Arkin), parents of a newborn baby daughter; black sheep son Jack (Morgan Stevens); and conservative youngest son Sam (David Oliver), married to free-spirited Kay (Sarah Jessica Parker). Diana Muldaur was a later addition to the cast as Dr. Alice Foley, Joe Gardner's new romantic interest. Amanda Peterson played Joe Gardner's granddaughter Sunny Sisk and Trey Ames played Gardner's grandson, David Sisk.

The miniseries was the third-highest rated miniseries of the 1986–87 American television season with a 16.9/27 rating/share.

The series ran for one complete season, but brought in low ratings and was not renewed for a second season, ranking 63rd with an average 11.9 rating. Despite the lack of viewership, Kiley won the Emmy and Golden Globe awards for Best Actor.

== Cast ==
- Richard Kiley as Joe Gardner
- Trey Ames as David Sisk
- Adam Arkin as Jim Eisenberg
- Jayne Atkinson as Lindley Gardner Eisenberg
- David Oliver as Sam Gardner
- Sarah Jessica Parker as Kay Ericson Gardner
- Amanda Peterson as Sunny Sisk
- Wendy Phillips as Anne Gardner Maxwell
- Morgan Stevens as Jack Gardner
- Eva Marie Saint as Ruth Gardner (although the family matriarch, she only appears in the first episode of the miniseries)
- Diana Muldaur as Dr. Alice Foley

== Episodes ==
=== Miniseries (1986) ===
No.	Title	Directed by	Written by	Original release date
Part–1	"The First Christmas"	Thomas Carter	Joshua Brand & John Falsey	December 15, 1986
Part–2	"Springtime/Autumn"	Thomas Carter	Story by : Joshua Brand & John Falsey (Autumn); Teleplay by : Stu Krieger Story by : Joshua Brand & John Falsey (Springtime); Teleplay by : Joshua Brand & John Falsey and Bruce Franklin Singer	December 16, 1986
Part–3	"Christmas '86"	Thomas Carter	Story by : Joshua Brand & John Falsey; Teleplay by : Stu Krieger	December 17, 1986

=== Series ===
No.	Title	Directed by	Written by	Original release date
1	"Don't I Know You From Somewhere?"	Thomas Carter	Story by : Joshua Brand & John Falsey; Teleplay by : Robin Green	September 16, 1987
2	"Things You Should Know Before and After"	Michael Toshiyuki Uno	Story by : Joshua Brand & John Falsey; Teleplay by : Stu Krieger	September 23, 1987
3	"What Do You Think Love Is?"	Michael Ray Rhodes	Story by : Joshua Brand & John Falsey; Teleplay by : Josef Anderson	September 30, 1987
4	"What Do People Do All Day?"	Jack Bender	Story by : Joshua Brand & John Falsey; Teleplay by : Pamela Douglas	October 21, 1987
5	"Dixie Chicken"	Michael Toshiyuki Uno	Story by : Joshua Brand & John Falsey; Teleplay by : Frederick Rappaport	October 28, 1987
6	"EM7, Raiders Minus 3 and a Half for a Nickel"	Michael Ray Rhodes	Unknown	November 4, 1987
7	"Acts of Faith"	Kevin Hooks	Story by : Joshua Brand & John Falsey; Teleplay by : David Chisholm	November 11, 1987
8	"In Dreams Begin Responsibilities"	Kevin Hooks	Teleplay by : Barbara Hall; Television Story by: Joshua Brand & John Falsey (Suggested from a Story by Debra McConnell)	November 18, 1987
9	"So Much Water So Close to Home"	Helaine Head	Story by : Joshua Brand & John Falsey; Teleplay by : Jeff Baron	November 25, 1987
10	"I Think You Know Something I Don't Know"	Arthur Allen Seidelman	Story by : Joshua Brand & John Falsey; Teleplay by : Barbara Hall	December 2, 1987
11	"While Someone Else is Sleeping or Opening a Window"	Rob Cohen	Teleplay by : James Kearns; Television Story by: Joshua Brand & John Falsey (Suggested from a Story by Andre Dubus)	December 16, 1987
12	"The Little Disturbance of Man"	Mimi Lender	Story by : Joshua Brand & John Falsey; Teleplay by : Robin Green	January 6, 1988
13	"Sometimes It's Hard to Remember"	Stephen Cragg	Story by : Joshua Brand & John Falsey; Teleplay by : James Kearns	January 13, 1988
14	"At the Last Moment, Enormous Changes"	Gabrielle Beaumount	Story by : Joshua Brand & John Falsey and Barbara Hall; Teleplay by : Barbara Hall	January 20, 1988
15	"Goodbye to All That"	Helaine Head	Story by : Joshua Brand & John Falsey; Teleplay by : Nick Harding	February 3, 1988
16	"The Go-Between"	Michael Ray Rhodes	Story by : Joshua Brand & John Falsey; Teleplay by : Doris Silverton	February 10, 1988
17	"Fathers and Other Strangers"	Kim Friedman	Story by : Joshua Brand & John Falsey; Teleplay by : Thom Thomas	February 17, 1988
18	"Common Ground"	Gabrielle Beaumount	Story by : Joshua Brand & John Falsey; Teleplay by : Susan Black	March 9, 1988
19	"Glory Days"	Mimi Lender	Story by : Joshua Brand & John Falsey; Teleplay by : Nick Harding	March 16, 1988
20	"The Politics of Being"	Joel Oliansky	Story by : Joshua Brand & John Falsey; Teleplay by : David Assael	March 23, 1988
21	"Peter Creek Road"	Michael Ray Rhodes	Story by : Joshua Brand & John Falsey & Robin Green; Teleplay by : Robin Green	April 6, 1988
22	"Love Mother"	Joshua Brand	Story by : Joshua Brand & John Falsey & Barbara Hall; Teleplay by : Barbara Hall	April 13, 1988
