= Joshua Brand =

American television writer and producer

- Born: November 29, 1950 (age 75); Queens, New York City, U.S.
- Education: City College of New York; Columbia University
- Occupations: Writer, producer, director

Joshua Brand is an American television writer, director, and producer who created St. Elsewhere, I'll Fly Away, A Year in the Life, and Northern Exposure with his writing-and-producing partner John Falsey, with whom he worked through 1994. He was also a writer and consulting producer of FX's 2013–18 series The Americans.

== Early life ==
Joshua Brand was born to a Jewish family and raised in Kew Gardens, Queens, New York City. His father, Jack, a tile setter and mother Miriam were emigrants from Eastern Europe, likely Poland. He graduated magna cum laude from City College of New York, after which he was given a fellowship to Columbia University, where he received a Master of Arts degree with honors in English Literature.

== Career ==
His play Babyface was produced in Los Angeles in 1978 and was selected as a semi-finalist in the Great American Play Contest sponsored by the Louisville Actors Theater. Another play, Grunts, was produced Off-Broadway at the Wonderhouse Theatre in New York City. In 2012, his full-length play The Real Me was a finalist at the O'Neill National Playwrights Conference.

Brand's early television career was spent writing scripts for MTM Enterprises' The White Shadow, where he and John Falsey met. The two of them then created St. Elsewhere for MTM in 1982 and wrote the story for every episode in the first season except one before leaving the show. He and Falsey then wrote and produced Amazing Stories for Steven Spielberg and the Emmy winning miniseries A Year in the Life before developing their other two signature series. By this point, Brand had transitioned away from writing and focused on "stories, rewriting and editing". At the 44th Primetime Emmy Awards in 1992, Brand and Falsey captured 15% of all nominations with 16 Emmy nominations for Northern Exposure and 15 for I'll Fly Away. During this time, Brand and Falsey also won three Emmys: outstanding miniseries in 1987 for A Year in the Life; outstanding writing in a miniseries or special for the I'll Fly Away pilot in 1992; and outstanding drama series for Northern Exposure that same year. In an unprecedented move by Public Broadcasting, PBS bought the rights to I'll Fly Away and rebroadcast the series in its entirety in the leadup to their original two-hour movie based on the show.

Brand and John Falsey created the short-lived series Going to Extremes, which was filmed entirely on the island of Jamaica. He has been nominated for eleven Emmy Awards (winning three, as noted above), as well as winning two Peabody Awards (Northern Exposure, I'll Fly Away), two Golden Globe Awards (Northern Exposure), along with the Humanitas Prize, the Producers Guild of America Award, and the Environmental Media Award for Ongoing Commitment. Falsey and Brand split as a team in 1994, with Falsey essentially leaving the industry, but in 2013, Brand and Falsey jointly received the Laurel Award for TV Writing Achievement from the Writers Guild of America.

Since 2013, Brand has been a writer and consulting producer of the acclaimed FX series The Americans; he wrote or co-wrote four episodes during the first season and has written two episodes in each subsequent season. The writers of the series, including Brand, received the Best Dramatic Series award at the 69th Writers Guild of America Awards, and they were also nominated for that award in 2015.

His directing credits include the feature film A Pyromaniac's Love Story, the television movies Wall to Wall Records and Homeward Bound, the television pilot Gemini Man, and episodes of thirtysomething and Joan of Arcadia. Brand was also nominated for an Emmy and a DGA Award for directing the two-hour I'll Fly Away pilot.
