= John Falsey =

American television writer and producer (1951–2019)

- Born: John Henry Falsey Jr. November 6, 1951; New Haven, Connecticut, U.S.
- Died: January 3, 2019 (aged 67); Iowa City, Iowa, U.S.
- Occupations: Television writer, director, producer

John Henry Falsey Jr. (November 6, 1951 – January 3, 2019) was an American television writer, director and producer.

== Biography ==
Falsey was born in New Haven, Connecticut, the son of Patricia Helene (née Sisk) and John Henry Falsey. Falsey graduated from Hampshire College with a Bachelor of Arts degree in English in 1975 and earned a Master of Fine Arts in Creative Writing from the Iowa Writers' Workshop at the University of Iowa. In 1979, he joined the production staff of The White Shadow, where he met Joshua Brand. Falsey enjoyed writing about family; and had a more pragmatic understanding of television as compared to Brand.

He co-created St. Elsewhere, I'll Fly Away, and Northern Exposure with Brand. Falsey also wrote and produced Amazing Stories and A Year in the Life. He was nominated for eleven Emmy Awards and won three, as well as the Humanitas Prize, the Producers Guild of America Award, and the Environmental Media Award for Ongoing Commitment.

Falsey left Northern Exposure, and the film and television industry as a whole, in 1993. He did return briefly to the industry in 1999, serving as a consulting producer for the majority of season 1 of Providence (which was created by Masius.) This was his only credit post-1993. It was reported Falsey had a "decades-long battle with alcoholism, during which he and Brand had no contact for almost 20 years." Ending the estrangement, Falsey and Brand both attended a 2013 Writers Guild of America ceremony to jointly accept the 2013 Paddy Chayefsky Laurel Award for Television. Around the same time, it was reported that Falsey had written a pilot for HBO, but it was not produced.

Falsey died on January 3, 2019, from injuries sustained in a fall.
