= Bob DeLaurentis =

American television producer and television writer

Robert DeLaurentis (born De Laurentiis) is an American television producer and television writer.

DeLaurentis wrote the 1982 film A Little Sex, and has also written a proposed script for a Doctor Who film. He has both written and produced for television shows including The O.C., Providence , Alfred Hitchcock Presents, Fargo and The Umbrella Academy. In addition to this he has written for South Beach, and produced The Big Easy.

== Personal life ==
DeLaurentis married Susan DeLaurentis. They have one child.

== Filmography ==
=== As writer/screenplay/story person ===
Movies
Year	Title	Notes
1978	Big City Boys	Writer
1981	Green Ice	Screenplay
1982	A Little Sex	Writer
1989	Bionic Showdown: The Six Million Dollar Man and the Bionic Woman	Story

TV Shows
Year	Title	Notes
1978	The White Shadow	Teleplay - Season 1, Episode 4
1983	St. Elsewhere	Writer - Season 2, Episode 5
1988-89	Alfred Hitchcock Presents	Writer - Season 3, Episodes 2,4,6,11 Season 4, Episodes 14 and 20
1988-89	Nick & Hillary	Writer - Season 1, Episodes 4 and 7
1992	Mann & Machine	Story and teleplay - Season 1 Episodes 1–9
1993	South Beach	Creator - Season 1, All Episodes, Teleplay - Episode 1
1996-97	The Big Easy	Writer - Season 1, Episodes 2, 7, 17, 22 Season 2, Episode 1 Teleplay - Season 1, Episode 22
1999-2001	Providence	Writer - Season 1, Episodes 3, 8, 17 Season 2, Episodes 1, 8, 9, 23 Season 3, Episodes, 1, 6, 7, 14, 22 Teleplay - Season 2, Episodes, 8, 9 Season 3, Episode 22
2005-06	The O.C.	Story - Season 3, Episode 1 -The Aftermath Season 3, Episode 25 - The Graduates
2009	The Unusuals	Writer - Season 1, Episode 4 - Crime Slut
2010	My Generation	Writer - Season 1, Episode 3 - Truth and Reconciliation
2019	The Umbrella Academy	Teleplay - Season 1, Episodes 5 - Number Five, and 9 - Changes
2015-2017, 2023	Fargo	Writer - Season 2, Episodes 3 - The Myth of Sisyphus and 8 - Loplop Season 3, Episodes 5 - The House of Special Purpose Epi. 9 - Aporia was written alongside Noah Hawley Season 5, Episode 6 - The Tender Trap
2025	Alien: Earth	Writer - Season 1, Episode 3 - Metamorphosis was written alongside Noah Hawlet
