= List of Providence episodes =

This is a list of episodes from the NBC series Providence. A total of 96 episodes aired over five seasons.

== Series overview ==
Season	Episodes	Originally released		Rank	Average viewership (in millions)
Season	Episodes	First released	Last released	Rank	Average viewership (in millions)
1	17	January 8, 1999	May 21, 1999	18	13.9
2	23	September 24, 1999	May 19, 2000	25	13.14
3	22	October 20, 2000	May 18, 2001	43	11.5
4	22	September 28, 2001	May 10, 2002	36	11.4
5	12	October 4, 2002	December 20, 2002	39	10.9

== Episodes ==
=== Season 1 (1999) ===
No. overall	No. in season	Title	Directed by	Written by	Original release date	Prod. code
1	1	"Pilot"	Michael Fresco	John Masius	January 8, 1999	63001
Dr. Sydney "Syd" Hansen, a cosmetic surgeon, returns to her family in Providence, Rhode Island, for her pregnant sister's wedding, but the ceremony is ruined by their chain-smoking mother dropping dead. Syd returns to California to find her boyfriend cheating on her, and flies back to Providence again just in time to deliver her sister's baby. This time she decides to stay.
2	2	"Home Again"	Michael Fresco	John Masius	January 15, 1999	63002
Sydney tries to help a battered mother (Ann Dowd) with her autistic child (Mika Boorem); Joanie names her baby; Kyle reenters Syd's life.
3	3	"All Good Dogs Go to Heaven"	Tucker Gates	Robert De Laurentiis	January 22, 1999	63003
Sydney bonds with a young woman (Renée Humphrey) whose condition worsens, Jim sympathizes with a dog that lost its master, and Joanie meets a soap star (Charlene Blaine).
4	4	"Sisters"	Ian Toynton	Lance Gentile	January 29, 1999	63004
Sydney tries to treat an addict (Alanna Ubach); Jim kidnaps a chimpanzee from the zoo. An uncredited Howie Mandel guest stars as himself.
5	5	"Runaway Sydney"	John Patterson	Nell Scovell	February 5, 1999	63005
Sydney is denied treatment of a baby after botching a spinal tap, her ex-boyfriend (Bradford Tatum) visits, and Jim is tempted by a client.
6	6	"Tying the Not"	Marc Buckland	Todd A. Kessler	February 12, 1999	63006
Joanie wants to marry her newborn child's father (Eric Bruskotter), while her older sister Sydney suppresses her doubts; Jim treats a mangy stray dog brought in by an equally scruffy street urchin.
7	7	"If Memory Serves"	John Whitesell	Judith Kahan	February 19, 1999	63007
Sydney's patient's (Beth Grant) husband (Michael Fairman) claims to have a brain tumor; Sydney and Joanie see that their father has been seeing another woman (Michelle Phillips); Robbie is smitten with an athletic coed.
8	8	"Blind Faith"	Michael Fresco	Robert De Laurentiis	February 26, 1999	63008
Sydney's hospital job is jeopardized by a surly surgeon and a blind date with an offbeat person (Michael McKean) who gets struck by lightning; a flu-ridden Jim believes a seeing-eye dog (voiced by Jay Leno) can talk.
9	9	"Taste of Providence"	Joe Ann Fogle	Lance Gentile	March 12, 1999	63009
Sydney helps a stripper (Nikita Ager) leave the business after requesting a breast reduction surgery, drawing fire from Dr. Marcus and the dancers angry lover; Joanie makes a splash at a cooking contest; Robbie gets involved with a bookie. Buddy Cianci guest stars.
10	10	"You Bet Your Life"	Ian Toynton	Nell Scovell	March 19, 1999	63010
Sydney is staggered by the indecent proposal of an eccentric, elderly but lustful millionaire (Henry Gibson) who offers her cash-starved medical clinic a fortune if she'll spend 48-hours traveling with him; a debt-ridden Robbie gets in deeper when he urges his injured girlfriend (Lori Rom) not to play in a key college basketball game while he secretly bets against her team; Joanie begins cooking school and falls for a mysterious fellow student who admires her "aphrodisiacal" clam chowder; Jim hires a klutzy veterinary assistant at the clinic.
11	11	"Pig in Providence"	Randall Zisk	Todd A. Kessler	April 2, 1999	63011
Sydney discovers Dr. Marcus' secret; a self-destructive teen patient (Nicki Aycox) isn't truthful with Sydney; Jim tries to save 400-pound pig from a luau roast.
12	12	"Saint Syd"	John Patterson	Andrew Gottlieb	April 9, 1999	63012
Sydney's attempt to help a wayward teen complicates the girl's relationship with her new foster parents; Joanie gets a business offer to go to Japan.
13	13	"Family Tree"	Michael Fresco	Patty Holmes	April 23, 1999	63013
Syd takes in Lily after her foster parents (Patricia Gaul & Gary Bullock) return her without permission; Robbie offers his boss' establishment as a showcase for Joanie's chowder.
14	14	"Good Fellows"	Michael Fresco	Todd A. Kessler	April 30, 1999	63014
Sydney treats an injured high-school runner whose coach/father drives him to win; the handsome son of a mob boss courts Sydney, as Jim treats the father's dog.
15	15	"Two to Tango"	Michael Fresco	Melissa Gould	May 7, 1999	63015
Sydney discourages a romantic prospect who has mob connections; Joanie's boyfriend shows little interest in her daughter.
16	16	"Guys and Dolls"	Ian Toynton	Carol Barbee	May 14, 1999	63016
Sydney and Jim clash over her involvement with Paul when the District Attorney's office investigates Paul's alleged mob ties; Joanie films her own television ad for the Bakery.
17	17	"Heaven Can Wait"	Michael Fresco	Robert De Laurentis	May 21, 1999	63017
Sydney reunites with Kyle who seeks her medical advice; a family celebration turns tragic when a friend from Lily's past arrives.

=== Season 2 (1999–2000) ===
No. overall	No. in season	Title	Directed by	Written by	Original release date	Prod. code
18	1	"The Third Thing"	Michael Fresco	Robert De Laurentiis & John Masius	September 24, 1999	63301
An out-of-control Mercedes smashes through the wall of the clinic; a mentally disturbed woman holds Sydney at gunpoint.
19	2	"The Letter"	Ian Toynton	Tim Kring	October 1, 1999	63302
On the anniversary of Lynda's death, Jim reveals that a letter he wrote may have contributed to her calamity.
20	3	"The Birthday Party"	John Patterson	Carol Mendelsohn	October 22, 1999	63303
Joanie gets an unpleasant surprise when Hannah's father comes to her birthday party with a new bride; Sydney offers the guest house to Kyle while he undergoes chemotherapy.
21	4	"You Can't Hurry Love"	Tony Wharmby	Dana Baratta	October 29, 1999	63304
Kyle urges Sydney to camp with him in the Grand Canyon, but she focuses on the welfare of a homeless woman.
22	5	"He's Come Undone"	Ian Toynton	Antoinette Stella	November 5, 1999	63305
Kyle fears he will lose his arm to an infection; Sydney learns a disturbing secret about a seemingly perfect doctor helping out in the clinic.
23	6	"The Phantom Menace"	Oz Scott	Elle Triedman	November 12, 1999	63306
Sydney sees Kyle's sexy therapist taking a special interest in him; Joanie and Robbie fear having their father appear on a television program.
24	7	"Sail Away"	Ian Toynton	Carol Barbee	November 19, 1999	63308
A recuperating Kyle decides to continue his recovery away from his friends and family; Jim gets replaced on the television vet show.
25	8	"Thank You Providence"	Michael Fresco	Story by : Robert DeLaurentis & John Masius; Teleplay by : Robert DeLaurentis & Carol Barbee	November 26, 1999	63307
26	9	"Thank You Providence"	Michael Fresco	Story by : Robert DeLaurentis & John Masius; Teleplay by : Robert DeLaurentis & Carol Barbee	November 26, 1999	63307
Sydney's trip back from Los Angeles hits numerous snags, so she bonds with three wayward travelers who are also having trouble getting home for the holidays.
27	10	"Home for the Holidays"	Tony Wharmby	Mike Kelley	December 17, 1999	63309
In an homage to It's a Wonderful Life, Syd discovers what would’ve happened to her and her family if she never returned home.
28	11	"The Kiss"	Melanie Mayron	Tim Kring	January 7, 2000	63310
Sydney discovers a Russian art prodigy who has been kept hidden by his grandmother out of fear of deportation.
29	12	"Mother and Child"	Rick Rosenthal	Carol Mendelsohn	January 21, 2000	63311
Sydney mistakenly thinks a youth is a victim of Muchausen syndrome by proxy; an old boyfriend of Robbie's new love interest comes to town.
30	13	"The Reunion"	Michael Fresco	Dana Baratta	February 4, 2000	63312
Sydney's best friend from high school, a celebrity author and television host, visits for their 15-year high-school reunion.
31	14	"The Apartment"	David Straiton	Antoinette Stella	February 11, 2000	63313
Robbie gets caught in the middle of Heather's feud with her mother, who is against Heather's engagement.
32	15	"Sibling Rivalry"	Monica Wyatt	Elle Triedman	February 18, 2000	63314
A patient considers radical surgery to decrease her chances of breast cancer; Sydney and Joanie become rivals in romance.
33	16	"Do the Right Thing"	Tony Wharmby	Carol Barbee	February 25, 2000	63315
An embezzler tricks Sydney into believing he is an indigent; Heather and Charlie walk down the wedding aisle.
34	17	"The Storm"	Michael Fresco	Norman Morrill	March 17, 2000	63316
A storm pounds Providence, while a state inspection threatens to close the clinic; Sydney works to save a pregnant Cambodian; a fallen tree traps Joanie.
35	18	"Don't Go Changin'"	Jeannot Szwarc	Rob Fresco	March 31, 2000	63317
The Hansens celebrate Jim's 60th birthday; Sydney is asked to perform a ritual surgery; Robbie and Heather look at their relationship; Joanie gives Dog Boy confidence.
36	19	"Family Ties"	Rick Rosenthal	Mike Kelley & Eli Talbert	April 14, 2000	63318
Sydney helps bring a broken family together during a crisis; Robbie fills in for Heather at the clinic; Dog Boy leaves Providence for good.
37	20	"Taking a Chance on Love"	Michael Fresco	Carol Barbee & Antoinette Stella	April 28, 2000	63319
Jim starts spending time with Sydney's photojournalist friend; Robbie auditions to be a contestant on a game show.
38	21	"Love Is in the Air"	Rick Rosenthal	Elle Triedman	May 5, 2000	63320
Things heat up between Jim and Monica; a firefighter rescues Joanie; Robbie continues his winning streak as a game show contestant.
39	22	"Syd in Wonderland"	Randall Zisk	Tim Kring	May 12, 2000	63321
Sydney's chronic headache leads to hallucinations that resemble "Alice's Adventure in Wonderland".
40	23	"Paradise Inn"	Michael Fresco	Robert De Laurentiis	May 19, 2000	63322
Comatose Sydney passes through a portal to a resort-like place where she must decide whether to return to consciousness or die.

=== Season 3 (2000–01) ===
No. overall	No. in season	Title	Directed by	Written by	Original release date	Prod. code
41	1	"Safe at Home"	Michael Fresco	Robert De Laurentiis	October 20, 2000	63851
Sydney returns home after battling encephalitis, but has doubts about her handsome physical therapist's treatment recommendations; Robbie is stalked by an angry producer.
42	2	"Trick or Treat"	Ian Toynton	Tim Kring	October 27, 2000	63852
As Halloween approaches, recovering Sydney misjudges and prescribes a dose that nearly kills a young girl; a game-show producer tries to blackmail Robbie.
43	3	"The Good Doctor"	Tony Wharmby	Ken LaZebnik	November 3, 2000	63853
Sydney counsels a ballerina whose ankle risks permanent injury; Robbie takes pity on his jailed tormentor.
44	4	"Rescue Me"	Greg Beeman	Rob Fresco	November 10, 2000	63854
Sydney takes pity on a poor, severely disfigured boy, who is an illegal immigrant.
45	5	"The Unsinkable Sydney Hansen"	Duane Clark	Carol Barbee	November 17, 2000	63856
Sydney discovers her new beau may be interested in a beautiful blonde, and helps a teen who was mistakenly prescribed Ritalin.
46	6	"The Thanksgiving Story"	Michael Fresco	Robert De Laurentiis & Elle Triedman	November 24, 2000	63855
47	7	"The Thanksgiving Story"	Michael Fresco	Robert De Laurentiis & Elle Triedman	November 24, 2000	63855
Near Thanksgiving Day, Sydney shelters a lost Chinese girl who got separated from her parents, who are illegal immigrants.
48	8	"The Gift"	Ian Toynton	Mike Kelley	December 15, 2000	63857
Sydney worries about an elderly patient who refuses throat surgery in favor of singing in a Christmas concert; Robbie finds an unusual assistant for his charity shopping spree.
49	9	"Big Night"	Michael Fresco	Tim Kring	January 5, 2001	63858
Memories Sydney would rather forget come flooding back when she tries to help an elderly patient survive long enough to reconcile with her daughter.
50	10	"The Gun"	Rick Rosenthal	Ken LaZebnik	January 12, 2001	63859
Sydney is unaware that someone has hidden a gun in a box of toys at the Hansens; Joanie hire a profession organizer to ride the house of clutter.
51	11	"Saved by the Bell"	Michael Fresco	Bob Fresco	February 2, 2001	63860
Sydney reaches out to a patient whose face is severely scarred; Joanie prepares for her marriage to Burt despite his parents' obvious displeasure.
52	12	"It Was a Dark and Stormy Night"	John R. Leonetti	Elle Triedman	February 9, 2001	63861
While Sydney is stranded with Graham in a lighthouse during a storm, she begins to understand where his terrible pain comes from.
53	13	"The Lion Sleeps Tonight"	Rick Rosenthal	Carol Barbee	February 16, 2001	63862
Sydney tries to convince a recluse to undergo plastic surgery for his facial deformities; Joanie withdraws after her miscarriage.
54	14	"The Invisible Man"	Greg Beeman	Robert De Laurentis & Mike Kelley	February 23, 2001	63863
Sydney convinces her reclusive lighthouse keeper to go out in public following his plastic surgery; Jim refuses to stop working while he is sick.
55	15	"Parenthood"	Monica Wyatt	Rob Fresco	March 2, 2001	63864
Sydney applies for a grant and meets a man who claims to be her father; Robbie's romance with the mother of one of his youth hockey players heats up.
56	16	"Love Story"	Ian Toynton	Elle Triedman	March 16, 2001	63865
Sydney learns that her new love interest has a congenital heart condition that will someday lead to sudden death.
57	17	"Exposure"	Rick Rosenthal	Carol Barbee	March 30, 2001	63866
Sydney's clinic and the Hansen house are put under quarantine when a visiting physician shows signs of the deadly Ebola virus.
58	18	"Magician"	Ian Toynton	John Romano	April 20, 2001	63867
Sydney, Joanie and Robbie are surprised by a visit from their wealthy grandfather, who makes them a suspicious offer.
59	19	"Meet Joe Connelly"	Michael Fresco	Mike Kelley	April 27, 2001	63868
Sydney fights a pharmaceutical company in hopes of attaining a drug to save the life of a deathly ill infant; Joanie encourages Elliot to come out to his mother.
60	20	"Trial & Error"	John Patterson	Carol Barbee & Elle Triedman	May 4, 2001	63869
Sydney urges a pharmaceutical company to continue testing a drug that could cure a deadly childhood disease.
61	21	"Rule Number One"	Tony Wharmby	Rob Fresco	May 11, 2001	63870
Sydney fights attraction to a married congressman (Steven Eckholdt) when she goes to Washington to urge drug research.
62	22	"Falling"	Michael Fresco	Story by : Ray DeLaurentis; Teleplay by : Robert DeLaurentis & Ray DeLaurentis	May 18, 2001	63871
Revealing photos and an estranged wife threaten Sydney's relationship with a married congressman (Steven Eckholdt).

=== Season 4 (2001–02) ===
No. overall	No. in season	Title	Directed by	Written by	Original release date	Prod. code
63	1	"Dad"	Michael Fresco	John Masius	September 28, 2001	64351
Sydney, Joanie and Robbie clash over one another's reactions to the changes their father has undergone since he was shot.
64	2	"Home Sweet Home"	Ian Toynton	Rob Fresco	October 5, 2001	64352
Joe invites Sydney out for a night on the town; Sydney struggles to reconcile an AIDS patient and his estranged father.
65	3	"Impulse Control"	Monica Wyatt	Elle Triedman	October 12, 2001	64353
Sydney becomes better acquainted with Joe's estranged wife, and the two women discover they like each other.
66	4	"You Can Count on Me"	Michael Fresco	Carol Barbee	October 19, 2001	64354
Sydney considers moving to Washington if Joe wins the election; a young patient must recover from an accident before he can donate bone marrow to his dying sister.
67	5	"Civil Unrest"	James Whitmore, Jr.	Mike Kelley	October 26, 2001	64355
As election day nears, Joe's campaign tactics prompt Sydney to question his integrity; Robbie saves Pete from an apartment fire.
68	6	"Best Man"	Kristoffer Tabori	Ann Hamilton	November 2, 2001	64356
Jim accidentally hits Robbie during his wedding toast; Sydney and Robbie have mutual disagreements; Hannah tries to find Joanie a man.
69	7	"The Honeymoon's Over"	John Patterson	Jennifer M. Johnson	November 9, 2001	64357
Robbie and Tina's honeymoon sours when airline troubles arise; Jim heads back to rehab and makes some painful revelations.
70	8	"Rocky Road"	Michael Fresco	Remi Aubuchon	November 16, 2001	64358
Sydney has second thoughts about seeing her new therapist; Jim helps a friend at the rehabilitation center who is making little progress in their recovery.
71	9	"Gobble Gobble"	Duane Clark	Rob Fresco	November 23, 2001	64359
On Thanksgiving Day, Jim does a good deed for a bus driver's grandmother, but his tardiness causes Sydney to worry.
72	10	"The Mating Dance"	Michael Fresco	Elle Triedman	December 14, 2001	64360
Sydney's therapist advises her to participate in speed dating; Joanie is selected to be a contestant on the show Blind Date.
73	11	"The Start of Something"	Ian Toynton	Carol Barbee	January 4, 2002	64361
A high-risk pregnancy patient stuns Sydney by slapping her with a malpractice lawsuit; Joanie has Phil climbing walls.
74	12	"Shadow Play"	Craig Zisk	Mike Kelley	January 11, 2002	64362
A hospital board member shadows Sydney in the wake of her malpractice suit; Tina seeks medical advice from Sydney regarding her ability to conceive a child.
75	13	"The Good Fight"	Michael Fresco	Jennifer Johnson	January 25, 2002	64363
Sydney meets her defense attorney for the malpractice suit -- an attractive man (George Newbern) with a stronger will than her own.
76	14	"All the King's Men"	Karen Gaviola	Ann Hamilton	February 1, 2002	64364
Sydney tries to help a young man escape a street gang, but is mistakenly implicated in the crime when he is shot; Joanie re-examines her relationship with Phil.
77	15	"Act Naturally"	Monica Wyatt	Rob Fresco	March 22, 2002	64365
While in Los Angeles, Sydney meets with her ex-boyfriend (Patrick Fabian), a hotshot at a television network, and Joanie joins the cast of a horror movie.
78	16	"Limbo"	Ian Toynton	John Masius; Elle Triedman	March 29, 2002	64366
Banned from practicing medicine, Sydney feels adrift and dreams she's being sold off at rock-bottom prices by a cable television shopping show host.
79	17	"The Whole Truth"	Michael Fresco	Jennifer Cecil	April 5, 2002	64367
Syd’s malpractice trial begins. Joanie considers enrolling in college.
80	18	"Gotcha"	James Whitmore, Jr.	Carol Barbee	April 12, 2002	64368
Owen coaxes stressed-out Sydney to participate in a water-pistol game; Joanie tries to fit in with younger culture as she returns to college.
81	19	"Great Expectations"	Ronald Victor Garcia	Rob Fresco nancy Won	April 19, 2002	64369
Sydney debates with a deaf girl's estranged parents about getting the child a cochlear implant; a free-spirited woman (Marilu Henner) catches Jim's eye.
82	20	"Things Have Changed"	James Quinn	Terrence Coli	April 26, 2002	64370
Romance blooms between Sydney and Owen (George Newbern); Jim must decide whether he would rather be with Georgia or with Meredith (Marcia Strassman).
83	21	"Smoke and Mirrors"	Ian Toynton	Jennifer Johnson & Mike Kelley	May 3, 2002	64371
A dog show diva (Melissa Gilbert) brings her pooch to the Hansen clinic for emergency grooming; Sydney moves in with Owen for protection from a schizophrenic patient who has become obsessed with her.
84	22	"Out of Control"	Michael Fresco	Elle Triedman & Ann Hamilton	May 10, 2002	64372
Sydney stays in Owen's apartment when her problems with Kevin persist; Tina has a medical emergency and gives birth prematurely.

=== Season 5 (2002) ===
No. overall	No. in season	Title	Directed by	Written by	Original release date	Prod. code
85	1	"A New Beginning"	Michael Fresco	Elle Triedman	October 4, 2002	5001
Sydney works under a demanding boss at an acute-care clinic while trying to raise money to rebuild Saint Clare's.
86	2	"It's Raining Men"	James Quinn	Carol Barbee	October 11, 2002	5002
Sydney starts to notice attractive men everywhere, including a globe-trotting doctor (Jeffrey Nordling).
87	3	"Cloak and Dagger"	Michael Fresco	Jennifer Johnson	October 18, 2002	5003
Sydney meets Owen's enigmatic parents (Sally Kellerman, John Bennett Perry); Joanie tries to find out the identity of a flirtatious caller; Jim is arrested at a rally, making him late to Sydney and Owen's engagement party.
88	4	"The Wedding Planner"	Ian Toynton	Mike Kelley	October 25, 2002	5004
Bob Eubanks and Fabio appear in Sydney's dream about The Newlywed Game; Joanie interviews and animal expert on the radio.
89	5	"Things That Go Bump in the Night"	Tony Wharmby	Jennifer Cecil	November 1, 2002	5005
Sydney misplaces her engagement ring, while Izzy says she does not want to leave the ER; Dr. Augustine mandates that Sydney work a double shift on Halloween night.
90	6	"The Heart of the Matter"	Kevin G. Cremin	Rob Fresco	November 8, 2002	5006
Sydney tries to prevent a pregnant prisoner's (Lauren Holly) extradition to Florida; and an eccentric woman (Betty White) brings her flea-bitten dog to the clinic.
91	7	"Truth and Consequences"	Michael Fresco	Nancy Won	November 15, 2002	5007
Sydney feels guilty about kissing Dr. Baylor (Jeffrey Nordling) as she heads to the county clerk's office with Owen to obtain a marriage license.
92	8	"Left-Overs"	James Quinn	Terrence Coli	November 22, 2002	5008
Mayhem ensues when the dog gobbles up the Hansen's Thanksgiving turkey; Sydney works all weekend and misses her wedding show.
93	9	"The Sound of Music"	Melina Kanakaredes	Ann Lewis Hamilton & Jennifer M. Johnson	December 6, 2002	5009
Owen rushes Sydney to the emergency room; Robbie signs up for dance lessons without consulting Tina; Rebecca Lynn Howard performs at the college.
94	10	"Eye of the Storm"	James Whitemore, Jr.	Carol Barbee; Jennifer Cecil	December 13, 2002	5010
Sydney responds to a tornado crisis in Tennessee; Joanie hires Owen to help fight a company that says it owns the rights to the name, "Joanie's Barkery".
95	11	"The Eleventh Hour"	Tony Wharmby	Elle Triedman	December 20, 2002	5011
96	12	"The Eleventh Hour"	Tony Wharmby	Elle Triedman	December 20, 2002	5011
A shooting victim's father takes the emergency room hostage; a Chicago firm offers Owen a partnership; Sydney gets cold feet on the eve of her wedding.
