= Lesli Kay =

American actress (born 1965)

- Born: Lesli Kay Pushkin; June 13, 1965 (age 61); Charleston, West Virginia, United States
- Other names: Leslie Kay Pushkin; Leslie Kay Sterling; Lesli Kay Sterling
- Education: Colorado State University
- Occupation: Actress
- Years active: 1991–present
- Spouses: Mark Sterling (m. 1992; div. 1999) Keith Coulouris (m. 2003; div. 2011)
- Children: 2
- Awards: Daytime Emmy

Lesli Kay (born Lesli Kay Pushkin on June 13, 1965 in Charleston, West Virginia) is an American actress, known for her roles on the CBS soap operas As the World Turns and The Bold and the Beautiful. For her role in As the World Turns, Kay received Daytime Emmy Award for Outstanding Supporting Actress in a Drama Series in 2001.

== Early life and education ==
Kay was born in Charleston, West Virginia. At age 12, she had the first individual girl's bat mitzvah in the state of West Virginia. She moved to New York City at the age of 15 to pursue a modeling career before graduating from Colorado State University. Kay later worked at MTV and won $27,500 on Wheel of Fortune.

== Career ==
In 1997 she made her daytime debut as Molly Conlan on As the World Turns. For some time the character was not very popular due to Molly's villainous behavior, but she eventually won a 2001 Daytime Emmy for Best Supporting Actress in addition to charming viewers during her romance with Jake McKinnon (Tom Eplin). When Jake was killed off in 2002, Molly again became adrift, and Kay left the show in early 2004 after a number of promised storylines never appeared. Kay popped up a few months later to recast the popular, brassy character of Lois Cerullo on General Hospital. Kay (and the resurrected character of Lois) exited GH in early 2005 after mutually agreeing to part ways with the show.

In November 2005, Kay assumed the role of Felicia Forrester on The Bold and the Beautiful, taking over for Colleen Dion after a year's absence. Bold and the Beautiful Head Writer Bradley Bell had planned to kill her character off from cancer. However, a huge fan outpouring, including petitions and numerous letters, in addition to Kay's job of making the role her own, convinced Bell to keep Kay on the cast. Her character, Felicia Forrester was resurrected from the dead. Lesli Kay invested herself into the cancer storyline so much that she shaved her head for the role. In 2007, Kay was nominated for Outstanding Supporting Actress at the 34th Annual Daytime Emmy Awards but lost to Genie Francis.

In 2008, it was announced that Kay would crossover to The Young and the Restless, in what was considered to be a semi-permanent basis. Kay's crossover to Y&R was short-lived and she returned to her home series. In 2009, it was announced that Kay would make history in becoming the first actress to hold two roles on two separate coasts, when she was announced to be returning to the role of Molly on As the World Turns, while maintaining her role as Felicia on a recurring status. She stayed with As the World Turns until the show's final episode on September 17, 2010. Kay continued making appearances on B&B until 2014, and then reprised the role in 2016.

== Filmography ==
=== Film ===
Lesli Kay film credits
Year	Title	Role	Notes	Ref.
1995	Forbidden Games	Shannon Douglas		
1996	Deadly Charades	Julie Sharp	Direct to video	
1996	Petticoat Planet	Sheriff Sarah Parker		
1996	Cyberella: Forbidden Passions	Jana		
1997	Guarded Secrets	Miranda		
2005	Carpool Guy	Vanessa		
2007	The Anna Nicole Smith Story	Ginger		
2007	Shadow People	Gretchen		
2009	My New SweetHeart	Carrie	Short film	
2013	Close to Home	Night Nurse	Short film	
2024	Chagrin			

=== Television ===
Lesli Kay television credits
Year	Title	Role	Notes	Ref.
1991	Hunter	Colleen	Episode: "All That Glitters" (as Leslie Kay Pushkin)	
1993	Counterstrike	Frenchie's Secretary	Episode: "French Twist" (as Leslie Kay Sterling)	
1995	Nowhere Man	Tina	Episode: "You Really Got a Hold On Me" (as Leslie Kay Sterling)	
1996	Hot Line	Samantha	Episode: "The Gardener" (as Leslie Kay Sterling)	
1996	High Tide	Agent Robin Foster	Episode: "Mission Improbable" (as Leslie Kay Sterling)	
1996–1997	The Big Easy	Sophie / Nurse	Episodes: "The Love Doctor" and "Driving Ms. Money" (as Leslie Kay Sterling)	
1997	Women: Stories of Passion	Unknown	Episode: "Table Service" (as Leslie Kay Sterling)	
1997–2004, 2009–2010	As the World Turns	Molly Conlan	Series regular: 1997–2004; Recurring star: 2009–2010	
2003	Law & Order	Amanda Taylor	Episode: "Maritime"	
2004–2005	General Hospital	Lois Cerullo	Series regular	
2005	CSI: NY	Tanya Daville	Episode: "Zoo York"	
2005–2014, 2016	The Bold and the Beautiful	Felicia Forrester	Series regular: 2005–2009; Recurring star: 2010–2014, 2016	
2008	The Young and the Restless	Felicia Forrester	Recurring star	
2009	Ghost Whisperer	Suzanne Zale / Celeste Barrington	Episode: "Stage Fright"	
2009	Raising the Bar	Massage Complainant	Episode: "Happy Ending"	
2009–2010	Venice: The Series	Tracy Lansing	Series regular: Season 1	
2010	The Bay	Belinda Madison	Series regular: Season 1	
2013	Dirty Teacher	Det. Peters	TV movie	
2013	The Good Mother	Janet	Lifetime TV movie	
2017	The Wrong Crush	Tracy	Lifetime TV movie	
2018	A Wedding for Christmas	Jane	TV movie	
2018	Baby Obsession (Your Baby Is Mine)	Margo	TV movie	
2019	The Wrong Cheerleader	Eliza	Lifetime TV movie	
2021	The Wrong Fiancé	Melinda	Lifetime TV movie	
2022	The Wrong Blind Date	Angela	Lifetime TV movie	
2022	Keeping Up with the Joneses	Captain O'Neill	3 episodes	
2023	Lucky Hearts	Harrington	TV movie	
