= South Beach (1993 TV series) =

- South Beach Intro
- Genre: Action; Adventure
- Created by: Dick Wolf; Robert DeLaurentis
- Starring: Yancy Butler; John Glover; Patti D'Arbanville; Eagle-Eye Cherry; Roberto Escobar
- Country of origin: United States
- Original language: English
- No. of seasons: 1
- No. of episodes: 7 (1 unaired)

Production
- Executive producers: Dick Wolf; Robert DeLaurentis
- Running time: 60 minutes
- Production companies: Wolf Films; Universal Television

Original release
- Network: NBC
- Release: June 6 – August 12, 1993

South Beach is an American action/adventure television series that aired on NBC from June 6 to August 12, 1993, during the summer of 1993. The series was created by Dick Wolf and Robert DeLaurentis and starred Yancy Butler, who had been the lead actress a year earlier in another failed Wolf/DeLaurentis series, Mann & Machine.

Set in South Beach, Florida, the Modesty Blaise-inspired storyline had Butler playing Kate Patrick, a thief who, along with her partner Vernon, is given the choice of going to jail or working for a government agency run by a man named Roberts (played by John Glover). The series saw Kate and Vernon (played by Eagle-Eye Cherry) take on various missions for Roberts, which usually called on the duo to make use of their skills as thieves. The series also co-starred Patti D'Arbanville. The first episode guest-starred the British actor, Christopher Bowen as Dimitriev.

Seven episodes were produced of this series, but only six were aired.

== Cast ==
- Yancy Butler as Kate Patrick
- John Glover as Roberts
- Patti D'Arbanville as Roxanne
- Eagle-Eye Cherry as Vernon
- Donna Rae Allen as Winona Donnelly

== Episodes ==
No.	Title	Directed by	Written by	Original release date	Prod. code
1	"Diamond in the Rough"	David Carson	Story by : Robert DeLaurentis & Dick Wolf; Teleplay by : Robert DeLaurentis & Glenn Davis & William Laurin	June 6, 1993	68801
2-hour episode.
2	"Pirates of the Caribbean"	Félix Enríquez Alcalá	Glenn Davis & William Laurin	June 8, 1993	68808
Kate discovers that one of Robert's minions is involved in a yacht-snatching ring when she penetrates the organization.
3	"Stake Out"	James Frawley	Story by : Robert DeLaurentis; Teleplay by : Glenn Davis & William Laurin	June 15, 1993	68810
Kate and her partner stake out a prominent South Beach socialite's home.
4	"Skin and Bones"	Ed Sherin	Story by : Glenn Davis & William Laurin; Teleplay by : Robert Palm	June 29, 1993	68809
Kate poses as a scuba diver searching for a stolen bejeweled chalice.
5	"Wild Thing"	Félix Enríquez Alcalá	Allison Robbins	July 6, 1993	68811
Kate sees herself in a rebellious girl (Jensen Daggett) who is the key to stolen gold.
6	"I Witness"	Christopher Leitch	Glenn Davis & William Laurin	August 12, 1993	68807
Kate investigates Haitian liquor smugglers.
7	"School for Scandal"	James Frawley	Allison Robbins	Unaired	68806
