= A Little Sex =

1982 film by Bruce Paltrow

- Theatrical release poster
- Directed by: Bruce Paltrow
- Written by: Bob DeLaurentis
- Produced by: Bruce Paltrow; Bob DeLaurentis
- Starring: Tim Matheson; Kate Capshaw; Edward Herrmann
- Cinematography: Ralf D. Bode
- Edited by: Bill Butler
- Music by: Georges Delerue
- Production company: MTM Enterprises
- Distributed by: Universal Pictures
- Release date: April 2, 1982
- Running time: 95 minutes
- Country: United States
- Language: English
- Budget: $6 million
- Box office: $2,370,376

A Little Sex is a 1982 American comedy film produced by MTM Enterprises and distributed by Universal Pictures. It was directed by Bruce Paltrow and written by Bob DeLaurentis. The film starred Tim Matheson, Kate Capshaw, and Edward Herrmann.

== Plot ==
Young television producer Michael Donovan tries to abandon his womanizing ways when he meets and marries elementary school teacher Katherine. Among his endearments to her is filming himself in his studio, costumed as "The Sandman," sitting on a makeshift moon with a starry background, and telling stories to entertain Katherine's class. When Michael's struggles to resist the near-irresistible temptations on his job lead to Katherine catching him in the act on the set, they separate. After his wise and composed older brother Tommy helps him see how empty womanizing really is, Michael puts "The Sandman" to work in a bid to win Katherine back.

== Cast ==
- Tim Matheson as Michael Donovan
- Kate Capshaw as Katherine Harrison
- Edward Herrmann as Tommy Donovan
- John Glover as Walter
- Joan Copeland as Mrs. Harrison
- Susanna Dalton as Nancy Barwood
- Wendie Malick as Philomena
- Wallace Shawn as Oliver
