= List of Alfred Hitchcock Presents (1985 TV series) episodes =

The following is a list of episodes for the American television anthology series Alfred Hitchcock Presents, which was a revival of the original American television anthology series of the same name. It was broadcast for four seasons from 1985 and 1989.

The new series lasted only one season on NBC; NBC cancelled it, but it was then produced for three more years by USA Network. A total of 76 episodes were produced.

== Series overview ==
| Season | Episodes | Originally released | | |
| Season | Episodes | First released | Last released | Network |
|---|---|---|---|---|
| Pilot film | 4 | May 5, 1985 | | NBC |
| 1 | 22 | September 29, 1985 | May 4, 1986 | NBC |
| 2 | 13 | January 24, 1987 | April 18, 1987 | Syndication |
| 3 | 21 | February 6, 1988 | August 6, 1988 | Syndication |
| 4 | 20 | October 8, 1988 | July 22, 1989 | Syndication |

== Episodes ==
=== Pilot film (1985) ===
A 100-minute made-for-TV film was presented as the pilot for the series; it consisted of four episodes, all remakes of ones from the original series. This first aired on May 5, 1985 on NBC.

Alfred Hitchcock Presents (1985 TV series) Pilot
| No. overall | No. in season | Title | Directed by | Written by | Stars | Remake of | Original release date |
|---|---|---|---|---|---|---|---|
| 1 | 1 | "Incident in a Small Jail" | Joel Oliansky | Joel Oliansky & Henry Slesar | Ned Beatty | AHP:S6:E23 | May 5, 1985 |
| 1 | 1 | "Man from the South" | Steve De Jarnatt | William Fay & Steve De Jarnatt; Story by : Roald Dahl | Steven Bauer, John Huston, Melanie Griffith, Kim Novak, & Tippi Hedren | AHP:S5:E15 | May 5, 1985 |
| 1 | 1 | "Bang! You're Dead!" | Randa Haines | Christopher Crowe & Harold Swanton | Bianca Rose & Gail Youngs | AHP:S7:E2 | May 5, 1985 |
| 1 | 1 | "An Unlocked Window" | Fred Walton | Fred Walton & James Bridges | Annette O'Toole & Bruce Davison | TAHH:S3:E17 | May 5, 1985 |

=== Season 1 (1985–86) ===
Alfred Hitchcock Presents (1985 TV series) Season 1
| No. overall | No. in season | Title | Directed by | Written by | Stars | Remake of | Original release date |
|---|---|---|---|---|---|---|---|
| 1 | 1 | "Revenge" | R. E. Young | David Stenn | David Clennon, Linda Purl | AHP:S1:E1 | September 29, 1985 |
In a remake of the original series' first episode, a man seeks revenge on his wife's attacker.
| 2 | 2 | "Night Fever" | Jeff Kanew | Clark Howard, Jeff Kanew, & Stephen Kronish | Robert Carradine & Lisa Pelikan | TAHH:S3:E28 | October 6, 1985 |
A wounded cop-killer tries to manipulate a nurse into helping him escape.
| 3 | 3 | "Wake Me When I'm Dead" | Frank Pierson | Story by : Lawrence Treat; Teleplay by : Irving Elman and Buck Henry | Barbara Hershey | AHP:S4:E9 | October 20, 1985 |
A prosecutor resorts to hypnosis to prove a case.
| 4 | 4 | "Final Escape" | Don Medford | Story by : Tom Cannan & Randall Hood; Teleplay by : Charles Grant Craig | Season Hubley, George DiCenzo, Patrice Donnelly, Jerry Hardin, & Davis Roberts (as Doc) | TAHH:S2:E18 | October 27, 1985 |
An incarcerated killer seeks the help of a gravedigger.
| 5 | 5 | "Night Caller" | John Byrum | Story by : Gabrielle Upton; Teleplay by : John Byrum | Sandra Bernhard, Michael O'Keefe, & Linda Fiorentino | TAHH:S2:E15 | November 5, 1985 |
A young woman is harassed in her apartment by a heavy breather phone caller.
| 6 | 6 | "Method Actor" | Burt Reynolds | Story by : Max Franklin; Teleplay by : Bill Kerby | Martin Sheen, Marilu Henner, Robby Benson, & Parker Stevenson | AHP:S7:E14 | November 10, 1985 |
| 7 | 7 | "The Human Interest Story" | Larry Gross | Story by : Fredric Brown; Teleplay by : Karen Harris | John Shea & James T. Callahan | AHP:S4:E32 | November 17, 1985 |
| 8 | 8 | "Breakdown" | Richard Pearce | Louis Pollock & Alfonse Ruggiero | John Heard, Andy García, José Luis Cuevas, Sebastián Ligarde | AHP:S1:E7 | December 1, 1985 |
| 9 | 9 | "Prisoners" | Christopher Crowe | Story by : S.R. Ross; Teleplay by : John Byrum | Cristina Raines & Yaphet Kotto | AHP:S1:E16 | December 8, 1985 |
An escaped convict breaks into a woman's house and makes himself at home; the two bond and become friends.
| 10 | 10 | "Arthur, or the Gigolo" | Thomas Carter | Story by : Arthur Williams; Teleplay by : Steve De Jarnatt | Brad Davis & Sandy Dennis | AHP S5E1 | December 15, 1985 |
A small-time crook marries a wealthy spinster for her diamond collection; he soon angers his new bride's "children", her dozens of cats.
| 11 | 11 | "The Gloating Place" | Christopher Leitch | Jim Beaver (uncredited); Story by : Robert Bloch; Teleplay by : David Stenn | Nicholas Hormann, Cindy Pickett & Kristy Swanson (minor role) | AHP:S6:E31 | January 5, 1986 |
| 12 | 12 | "The Right Kind of Medicine" | Christopher Leitch | Story by : Henry Slesar; Teleplay by : Michael Braverman | Jack Thibeau, Robert Prosky | AHP:S7:E11 | January 12, 1986 |
| 13 | 13 | "Beast in View" | Michael Toshiyuki Uno | Robert Glass; Based on the novel by: Margaret Millar | Cliff Potts, Janet Eilber | TAHH:S2:E21 | January 19, 1986 |
| 14 | 14 | "A Very Happy Ending" | Tom Rickman | Tom Rickman | Robert Loggia & Joaquin Phoenix | TBA | February 16, 1986 |
| 15 | 15 | "The Canary Sedan" | Joan Tewkesbury | Story by : Ann Bridge; Teleplay by : Joan Tewkesbury | Ian Abercrombie & Kathleen Quinlan | AHP:S3:E37 | March 2, 1986 |
| 16 | 16 | "Enough Rope for Two" | David Chase | Story by : Clark Howard; Teleplay by : David Chase | Jeff Fahey, Timothy Daly, & Darlanne Fluegel | AHP:S3:E7 | March 9, 1986 |
| 17 | 17 | "The Creeper" | Christopher Crowe | Story by : Joseph Ruscoll; Teleplay by : Steve Bello & Stephen Kronish | Karen Allen, Timothy Carhart, & Lori Butler | AHP:S1:E38 | March 16, 1986 |
| 18 | 18 | "Happy Birthday" | Randy Roberts | Frisco Miller | Lane Smith, Noel Conlon, & Nana Visitor | TBA | March 23, 1986 |
| 19 | 19 | "The Jar" | Tim Burton | Story by : Ray Bradbury; Teleplay by : Michael McDowell | Stephen Shellen, Griffin Dunne, & Fiona Lewis | TAHH:S2:E17 | April 6, 1986 |
A struggling artist displays a jar with a mysterious 'thing' inside.
| 20 | 20 | "Deadly Honeymoon" | Don Medford | Story by : Henry Slesar; Teleplay by : Stephen Kronish | Victoria Tennant, David Dukes, Nicolas Coster, & Alan Fudge | TBA | April 13, 1986 |
| 21 | 21 | "Four O'Clock" | Andrew Mirisch | Story by : Cornell Woolrich; Teleplay by : Steve Bello | Richard Cox, Nicholas Pryor, & Ellen Tobie | Suspicion | May 4, 1986 |
A judge, suspecting his wife of cheating on him, builds a time bomb in the basement of their house intending to kill her, only to become trapped when two robbers break in and leave him tied up in the basement... with the bomb timed to detonate at 4:00 pm.
| 22 | 22 | "Road Hog" | Mario Di Leo | Story by : Stuart Rosenberg; Teleplay by : Charles Grant Craig, Stephen Kronish & Steve Bello | Burt Young, Ronny Cox, Doug Savant, & Lee Bryant | AHP:S5:E11 | May 11, 1986 |

=== Season 2 (1987) ===
Alfred Hitchcock Presents (1985 TV series) Season 2
| No. overall | No. in season | Title | Directed by | Written by | Stars | Remake of | Original release date |
|---|---|---|---|---|---|---|---|
| 24 | 1 | "The Initiation" | Robert Iscove | Rob Hedden & Jim Beaver | Marion Ross | TBA | January 24, 1987 |
| 25 | 2 | "Conversation Over a Corpse" | Robert Iscove | Norman A. Daniels | Barbara Babcock & Kate Reid | AHP:S2:E8 | January 31, 1987 |
| 26 | 3 | "Man on the Edge" | Robert Iscove | Jim Beaver | Mark Hamill & Michael Ironside | AHP S4E7 | February 7, 1987 |
A police negotiator (Michael Ironside) tries to talk a suicidal man (Mark Hamill) down from jumping from his hotel window by finding the reason why.
| 27 | 4 | "If the Shoe Fits" | Allan King | Jonathan Glassner | Ted Shackelford, Lawrence Dane, Lori Hallier, Colin Fox, Cynthia Belliveau, Lois Maxwell | TBA | February 14, 1987 |
| 28 | 5 | "The Mole" | Ryszard Bugajski | Rick Berger | Edward Herrmann, Don Francks, Bernard Behrens | TBA | February 21, 1987 |
A psychiatrist (Edward Herrmann) and a retiring police officer (Don Francks) must track down an escaped serial killer nicknamed "The Mole".
| 29 | 6 | "Anniversary Gift" | Ryszard Bugajski | John Collier | Pamela Sue Martin, Peter Dvorsky | AHP:S5:E6 | February 28, 1987 |
| 30 | 7 | "The Impatient Patient" | Allan King | John Antrobus | E.G. Marshall | TBA | March 7, 1987 |
| 31 | 8 | "When This Man Dies" | Jim Purdy | Jeremy Hole, Lawrence Block | Adrian Zmed | TBA | March 14, 1987 |
A mechanic (Zmed) threatened by a loan shark (Frank Moore) is tempted to kill a man to receive inheritance money
| 32 | 9 | "The Specialty of the House" | Allan King | Story by : Stanley Ellin | John Saxon, Jennifer Dale, & Neil Munro | AHP:S5:E12 | March 21, 1987 |
| 33 | 10 | "The Final Twist" | Atom Egoyan | Jim Beaver | Martin Landau | TBA | March 28, 1987 |
| 34 | 11 | "Tragedy Tonight" | Sturla Gunnarsson | Jonathan Glassner | Catherine Mary Stewart | TBA | April 4, 1987 |
| 35 | 12 | "World's Oldest Motive" | Allan King | Richard Chapman, Larry M. Harris | Dwight Schultz, Cynthia Dale, Gloria Reuben | TAHH:S3:E25 | April 11, 1987 |
| 36 | 13 | "Deathmate" | Allan King | James Causey, Marlene Matthews | Samantha Eggar, John Colicos | AHP:S6:E27 | April 18, 1987 |

=== Season 3 (1988) ===
Alfred Hitchcock Presents (1985 TV series) Season 3
| No. overall | No. in season | Title | Directed by | Written by | Stars | Original release date |
|---|---|---|---|---|---|---|
| 37 | 1 | "VCR – Very Careful Rape" | Zale Dalen | Michael Sloan | Melissa Sue Anderson, Cedric Smith | February 6, 1988 |
| 38 | 2 | "Animal Lovers" | Sturla Gunnarsson | Robert DeLaurentis | Susan Anton, Ron White, Cec Linder | February 13, 1988 |
| 39 | 3 | "Prism" | Allan King | Michael Sloan | Lindsay Wagner & Michael Sarrazin | February 20, 1988 |
| 40 | 4 | "A Stolen Heart" | Rene Bonniere | Robert DeLaurentis | William Katt | February 27, 1988 |
| 41 | 5 | "Houdini on Channel 4" | Timothy Bond | Michael Sloan | Nick Lewin | March 5, 1988 |
| 42 | 6 | "Killer Takes All" | Allan King | Michael Sloan & Robert DeLaurentis | Van Johnson, Rory Calhoun | March 12, 1988 |
| 43 | 7 | "Hippocritic Oath" | Vic Sarin | Michael Colleary & Ray DeLaurentis | Shaun Cassidy | March 19, 1988 |
| 44 | 8 | "Prosecutor" | David Gelfand | Glenn Davis & William Laurin | Parker Stevenson | March 26, 1988 |
| 45 | 9 | "If Looks Could Kill" | William Fruet | Story by : Michael Colleary & Ray DeLaurentis; Teleplay by : Susan Woollen | Michelle Phillips, Duncan Regehr, Peter MacNeill, Lisa Schrage, Andrea Roth | April 23, 1988 |
| 46 | 10 | "You'll Die Laughing" | Zale Dalen | Michael Sloan | Anthony Newley | April 30, 1988 |
| 47 | 11 | "Murder Party" | Allan King | Robert DeLaurentis | Leigh Taylor-Young, David McCallum, Colin Fox, David Hemblen, Malcolm Stewart | May 7, 1988 |
| 48 | 12 | "Twist" | René Bonnière | Manny Coto | Stella Stevens, Roberta Weiss, Clive Revill, Art Hindle | May 14, 1988 |
| 49 | 13 | "User Deadly" | Allan King | Glenn Davis, William Laurin, Brian L. Ross | Harry Guardino | May 21, 1988 |
| 50 | 14 | "Career Move" | Timothy Bond | Glenn Davis, William Laurin | David Cassidy | May 28, 1988 |
| 51 | 15 | "Full Disclosure" | Bill Corcoran | Glenn Davis, William Laurin | Robert Lansing, Al Waxman | June 18, 1988 |
| 52 | 16 | "Kandinsky's Vault" | René Bonnière | Steven Hollander | Eli Wallach, Lisa Jakub | June 25, 1988 |
| 53 | 17 | "There Was a Little Girl..." | Atom Egoyan | Charles Grant Craig | Michael Tucker, Kate Vernon, Wanda Cannon, Wayne Robson | July 2, 1988 |
| 54 | 18 | "Twisted Sisters" | Timothy Bond | Michael Colleary, Ray DeLaurentis | Mia Sara, Yannick Bisson | July 9, 1988 |
| 55 | 19 | "The 13th Floor" | Mark Rosman | Naomi Janzen | Anthony Franciosa | July 16, 1988 |
| 56 | 20 | "Hunted: Part One" | Timothy Bond | Michael Sloan | Edward Woodward | July 30, 1988 |
| 57 | 21 | "Hunted: Part Two" | Timothy Bond | Michael Sloan | Edward Woodward | August 6, 1988 |

=== Season 4 (1988–89) ===
Alfred Hitchcock Presents (1985 TV series) Season 4
| No. overall | No. in season | Title | Directed by | Written by | Stars | Remake of | Original release date |
|---|---|---|---|---|---|---|---|
| 57 | 1 | "Fogbound" | Mark Sobel | Lee Erwin | Kathleen Quinlan, Jonathan Crombie, Jeremy Ratchford | TAHH:S1:E17 | October 8, 1988 |
| 58 | 2 | "Pen Pal" | Rene Bonniere | Jay Folb, Hilary Murray, Henry Slesar | Jean Simmons & Page Fletcher | AHP:S6:E6 | October 15, 1988 |
| 59 | 3 | "Ancient Voices" | Bill Corcoran | Glenn Davis, William Laurin, Michael Sloan | Richard Anderson, Doug McClure, J.C. MacKenzie, Rob Stewart | TBA | November 12, 1988 |
| 60 | 4 | "Survival of the Fittest" | Allan King | Michael Sloan | Patrick Macnee, Nigel Bennett | TBA | November 19, 1988 |
| 61 | 5 | "The Big Spin" | Al Waxman | Matt Dearborn, Maxwell Pitt | Erik Estrada, Kathleen Laskey, Guylaine St-Onge | TBA | January 7, 1989 |
| 62 | 6 | "Don't Sell Yourself Short" | René Bonnière | Douglas Steinberg | David Soul, Leon Pownall, Harvey Atkin, Susan Hogan | TBA | January 14, 1989 |
| 63 | 7 | "For Art's Sake" | Bill Corcoran | Linda Chase | Simon Williams, Bruce Gray, Sheila McCarthy, Michele Scarabelli | TBA | January 21, 1989 |
| 64 | 8 | "Murder in Mind" | Allan King | Emily Neff, Saret Tobias | Melissa Sue Anderson, Noel Harrison | AHP S2E13 | January 28, 1989 |
| 65 | 9 | "Mirror Mirror" | Richard J. Lewis | Jack Blum, Sharon Corder | Elizabeth Ashley | TBA | February 4, 1989 |
| 66 | 10 | "Skeleton in the Closet" | George Mendeluk | Brian Clemens, Glenn Davis, William Laurin | Mimi Kuzyk, Jeff Wincott, Michael Kirby | TBA | February 11, 1989 |
| 67 | 11 | "In the Driver's Seat" | Timothy Bond | Glenn Davis, William Laurin | David James Elliott, Greg Evigan, Nadine van der Velde | TBA | February 18, 1989 |
| 68 | 12 | "Driving Under the Influence" | Brad Silberling | Josephine Cummings, Richard Yalem | Mike Connors, Shirley Douglas, John Novak, Gwynyth Walsh | TBA | February 25, 1989 |
| 69 | 13 | "In the Name of Science" | Zane Dalen | Glenn Davis, William Laurin | Dirk Benedict | TBA | March 11, 1989 |
| 70 | 14 | "Romance Machine" | René Bonnière | Bob DeLaurentis | Rich Hall, Diane Franklin, Art Hindle, Barclay Hope | TBA | March 25, 1989 |
| 71 | 15 | "Diamonds Aren't Forever" | Peter Crane | Glenn Davis, William Laurin | George Lazenby | TBA | April 15, 1989 |
| 72 | 16 | "My Dear Watson" | Jorge Montesi | Susan Woollen, Arthur Conan Doyle | Brian Bedford | TBA | April 22, 1989 |
| 73 | 17 | "Night Creatures" | Richard J. Lewis | Michael Sloan | Brett Cullen | TBA | April 29, 1989 |
| 74 | 18 | "The Man Who Knew Too Little" | Ray Austin | William Laurin, Glenn Davis | Lewis Collins | TBA | July 8, 1989 |
| 75 | 19 | "Reunion" | John Wood | Michael Sloan | Geraint Wyn Davies | TBA | July 15, 1989 |
| 76 | 20 | "South by Southeast" | Timothy Bond | Michael Sloan, Robert De Laurentiis | Patrick Wayne | TBA | July 22, 1989 |

== See also ==
- List of Alfred Hitchcock Presents episodes (1955–1965 series)
