= The Big Easy (TV series) =

American crime drama television series

- Genre: Crime drama
- Based on: The Big Easy by Daniel Petrie Jr.
- Developed by: Jacqueline Zambrano
- Starring: Tony Crane; Barry Corbin; Eric George; Susan Walters; Leslie Bibb
- Composers: David Torkanowsky; Joseph Vitarelli
- Country of origin: United States
- Original language: English
- No. of seasons: 2
- No. of episodes: 35

Production
- Executive producers: Larry Jacobson; Sonny Grosso; Daniel Petrie Jr.; Robert De Laurentiis; Jacqueline Zambrano
- Producers: Blue André; David Calloway
- Production locations: New Orleans, Louisiana, United States
- Camera setup: Film; Single-camera
- Running time: 60 minutes
- Production companies: Grosso-Jacobson Productions; ITC Entertainment; PolyGram Filmed Entertainment

Original release
- Network: USA Network
- Release: August 11, 1996 – October 12, 1997

The Big Easy is an American crime drama series that was based on the 1987 film of the same name.

The show premiered on the USA Network on August 11, 1996. Tony Crane played New Orleans police detective lieutenant Remy McSwain, Susan Walters played state district attorney Anne Osbourne, and Barry Corbin played police chief C.D. LeBlanc. It was developed by Jacqueline Zambrano, based on the characters created by Daniel Petrie Jr., who wrote the screenplay to the film and also was the executive producer of the series. Thirty-five episodes were broadcast over two seasons.

The series takes place in New Orleans, Louisiana, and was shot on location.

== Premise ==
A male New Orleans detective and a female district attorney investigate crimes for the New Orleans police department.

== Cast ==
- Tony Crane as Det. Remy McSwain
- Barry Corbin as Sheriff C.D. LeBlanc
- Eric George as Smiley Dupree
- Susan Walters as Anne Osbourne (season 1)
- Karla Tamburelli as Det. Darlene Broussard (season 1)
- Troy Bryant as A.D.A. Lightin' Hawkins (season 1)
- Leslie Bibb as Det. Janine Rebbenack (season 2)

== Episodes ==
=== Series overview ===
Season	Episodes	Originally released	
Season	Episodes	First released	Last released
1	22	August 11, 1996	March 9, 1997
2	13	June 22, 1997	October 12, 1997

=== Season 1 (1996–97) ===
No. overall	No. in season	Title	Directed by	Written by	Original release date
1	1	"Pilot"	James Frawley	Jacqueline Zambrano	August 11, 1996
Detective Remy McSwain is a brash, womanizing, and unconventional New Orleans police detective who doesn't always play by the rules in order to get criminals locked up. But with the help of his uncle C.D. LeBlanc, the police chief and a fanatic Civil War buff, and Remy's man-hungry detective partner, Darlene Broussard, he always manages to stay one step ahead of the law. But everything changes with the arrival of Anne Osborne, a district attorney from Washington DC whom is sent to oversee a case of illegal fishing in the remote bayous where Remy is investigating a murder which may lead to a high-up power in the city council. Anne finds herself captivated by the intense good/bad cop who tries to gain her affections with the help of his street informant and blues musician Smiley Dupree, while the local district attorney, Lightnin' Hawkins, persuades Anne to get close to Remy in order to nail him on a corruption probe the city is putting on.
2	2	"Murder in Mind"	Vern Gillum	Bob DeLaurentis	August 18, 1996
As Anne settles in New Orleans (aka: The Big Easy) to stay, Remy continues to try to win her affections with the help of Smiley and his other associates, while both Anne and Remy have fantasies about the other, while Lightin' Hawkins also tries to get Anne to notice him as well. Meanwhile, a fortune-telling friend of Remy's, named Zelda Riley (Katherine LaNasa), tells him about a premonition about a street informant being murdered. Remy investigates and soon locks horns again with Anne who suspects Zelda somehow being involved, while Remy thinks otherwise and sets out to prove it.
3	3	"Cinderfella"	Vern Gillum	Anne Kenney	August 25, 1996
Remy investigates the murder of a groom at his bachelor party where the only evidence is that of a high-heeled shoe left behind by the killer who may have been a transvestite. In attempting to dig into the past of the murder victim, Anne also learns some hidden facts about the groom's real interests as well as the bride-to-be's urges. Elsewhere, C.D. tries to find time to help Remy with his investigation while planning to hold another Civil War re-enactment outside of town.
4	4	"Hotshots"	Kristoffer Tabori	Laurence Frank	September 8, 1996
Remy and Anne investigate the mysterious death of a jazz musician friend of Smiley's where circumstantial evidence points to supernatural occurrences connected to a shady music producer, named Tyrell (Tom Verica), whom Remy begins to suspect that he may in fact be the Devil incarnate. But the skeptic Anne tries to put together a rational explanation for the unexplained events happening around them when a blind blues singer confirms that the musician's death was Satan's work.
5	5	"A Dead Man Is Hard to Find"	Don Scardino	Sherri Ziff	September 15, 1996
Remy investigates the death of the father of a young débutante in a suspicious plane crash in the swamps and learns a series of facts about the unscrupulous businessman, including the fact that C.D. was romantically involved with the widow of the victim. Meanwhile, Anne, with Darlene's help, strikes out on her own investigation into the mysterious death by trying to establish a motive by either the débutante daughter Alana (Mary Catherine Garrison), or the estranged artist son Kent (Douglas M. Griffin).
6	6	"Stodermayer"	James Frawley	Bob DeLaurentis	September 22, 1996
Anne's fiancée, Geoffrey Stodermayer (Kenny Johnson), a marine biologist, arrives in town to set an upcoming date for their wedding in which Remy drags him into his latest case of investigating a shady strip club owner's liquor imports in which Geoffrey develops an attraction to Gigi (Rebecca McFarland), an informant who works at the Naked Angel exotic club and is soon put in jeopardy by the thugs out to silence her and anyone else who informs on them.
7	7	"The Gambler"	Kristoffer Tabori	Eric DelaBarre	September 29, 1996
Remy tries to help out his old friend Delbert (Jeremiah Birkett), a gambling addict, whom is heavily in debit to a local mobster. But when a treasury agent is found murdered at the casino boat where Delbert hangs out, Anne learns that he has been investigating Remy at the behest of Hawkins, while the leads that Remy follows point to the casino owner who is involved in a counterfeit operation and he asks Anne to pose as bait to entrap the owner.
8	8	"Crawdaddy"	Vern Gillum	Anne Kenney	October 6, 1996
Remy begins moonlighting as a personal bodyguard to a wealthy shipping magnate when his life is threatened. But Remy cannot resist temptation to the rich guy's young wife, Isabella (Siena Goines), while leads point to a sordid state of affairs involving a prenuptial agreement, and the man's first jealous wife. Meanwhile, Anne asks Smiley to go undercover to investigate Isabella's past involving her shady "brother" Martin connected to a local pimp who may hold a clue to the case. Elsewhere, Darlene struggles to run the station house in the absence of several officers on leave.
9	9	"Love Doctor"	Kristoffer Tabori	Laurence Frank	October 13, 1996
When Anne's younger sister, Sophie (Lesli Kay Sterling), arrives in town for a quick visit, Remy takes them, Darlene, and Smiley out to a fund raiser at a local art gallery to save a local radio station where the star DJ, Cougan, is murdered. With everyone trapped inside the building by a sudden hurricane, Remy puts his detective skills into full force to find the killer in a building where nearly everyone, including Sophie, is a suspect as well as has ties to Cougan's sordid love life.
10	10	"That Voodoo That You Do"	Vern Gillum	Fred Golan	October 20, 1996
Remy investigates the mysterious death of a businessman whom he believes it to be the work of voodoo. While everyone, but the skeptic Anne, believes in the local voodoo superstitions, Remy sets off with Smiley to find the right culprit, while Anne decides to try out an experimentation to see if it really exists by concocting a "love potion" for Remy to notice her.
11	11	"Snake Dance"	Kristoffer Tabori	Janet Densmore	December 8, 1996
Remy, C.D., and Darlene investigate the mysterious death of a cult guru who was crushed to death by a large snake. While Anne and Remy try to seek out a dominatrix snake charmer who was seen in the company of the guru, Smiley is asked by Remy to go undercover at the religious group to find out any cult members with a background to mental instability as well as a connection to the handling of snakes.
12	12	"Big Life"	Vern Gillum	Sherri Ziff	December 15, 1996
On the night of Marti Gras, Remy finds himself held hostage at his hangout, the Blue Spot Bar, by an escaped convict, named Lyle Tillman (Silas Weir Mitchell), who seeks to prove his innocence of a murder-robbery the previous year while Lyle's very pregnant wife, Grace, holds C.D. hostage in his office at the police station as another bargaining chip leading to Darlene (stuck wearing a Little Bo Peep costume) as well as Anne (stuck in a Marie Antoinette costume) to try to help defuse the situation while Smiley finds himself the errand boy between the two standoffs while Hawkins assembles a group of SWAT men (stuck in clown costumes) to plan a brash assault on the bar in spite of the situation.
13	13	"Master of Illusion"	Vern Gillum	Tammy Ader	December 22, 1996
In this take on 'Rear Window' one of Anne's friends, Holly (Paula Sorge), whom is recovering with a broken leg, thinks she's witnessed a murder in the apartment from across the courtyard from her apartment. Remy initially doubt's Holly's story, but soon launches a personal investigation into the neighbor whom is a illusionist from England whom may be holding more than a few skeletons in his closet. Elsewhere, Remy makes a bet with C.D. for him stop smoking cigars for 48 hours.
14	14	"Don't Shoot the Piano Player"	William Malone	Bob DeLaurentiis	January 12, 1997
Remy tries to help out Frank (David Newsom), an old piano-playing friend whom has a crush on a young mobster's girlfriend, and when he's accused of murdering the thug, Remy must go against all laws of ethics to try to protect his friend from a powerful mob kingpin, as well as the femme fatal Gina (Kari Wuhrer), who holds a dark past which may involve a mysterious killer, dressed as a clown, who comes after Remy. Meanwhile, Smiley decides to buy a new car for himself, but when Remy destroys it in attempt to fake Frank's death, Smiley wants compensation for it.
15	15	"Long and Short"	Peter Ellis	Story by : Anne Kenney; Teleplay by : Fred Golan	January 19, 1997
Remy investigates the murder of a traveling con artist whom may have been involved in a big scam to locate a mysterious cargo of merchandise worth millions. Assisting Remy and Anne with their case is a klutzy and accident-prone private investigator looking for clues involving another scam in which the murder victim's partner, a local grifter named Nikki whom Remy used to know, may be either conning them or is a target herself.
16	16	"Gatoraide"	Tom DeSimone	Anne Kenney	January 26, 1997
Remy, Anne, and C.D. are approached by a young policewoman and Civil War buff to help her investigate the murder of her friend whom was allegedly trying to track down alligator poaches in the bayous. While Remy begins to think there is a connection between a bar owner whom operates without a liquor license, Anne and Officer Joyce get stuck in a tree to get away from an aggressive alligator, while C.D. is persuaded by Joyce to let her join his reenactment group. Also, Smiley tries to find more work to write while he continues his music career.
17	17	"Driving Ms. Money"	James Frawley	Jacquelyn Blain	February 2, 1997
Remy and his team investigate the death of an elderly and ailing socialite at a fund-raiser where Anne and Hawkins were in attendance. Hawkins thinks that the manservant, Bernard, was responsible when the cause of death is listed as a deliberate prescription medication overdose. But Remy tries to prove Bernard's innocence and in so doing learns some disturbing facts about his real relationship with his employer and his connection to his young lawyer, Felice.
18	18	"The Fabulous Bill Brothers"	Vern Gillum	Story by : Robert De Laurentiis & Jacqueline Zambrano; Teleplay by : Robert De Laurentiis	February 9, 1997
In the retrospective season final, Remy and Anne are abducted by a pair of redneck brothers whom Remy put away their serial killing eldest brother, leading to the mismatched detective and attorney trying to get away from their would-be killers by hiding out deep in the swamps where they reminisce about their happier and more harrowing times. Meanwhile, C.D. and Smiley figure out that Remy and Anne are in trouble when they go missing and try to find them before the Bill Brothers have their chance to lynch them.
19	19	"Lafitte Don't Fail Me Now"	Vern Gillum	Laurence Frank	February 16, 1997
While investigating the murder of a mysterious businessman at a kiddie park, Remy, Anne, and Smiley get drawn into a search for four parts of what appear to be a legendary treasure map leading to a hidden 18th Century pirate treasure in the area which is also sought after by a one-eyed Frenchman who may have a connection to the murder victims, and to a local barmaid who may know more than she knows about the treasure map.
20	20	"Ghost of the Prickly Rose"	Vern Gillum	Tammy Ader	February 23, 1997
While investigating the death of a wealthy businessman who died from a fall at a house reputed to be haunted, Remy and the team try to disapprove of the theory that the ghost of a scorned woman is behind it who shows up to murder three men every seven years. While Remy deals with a persistent female reporter, whom he once had a tryst with, Anne volunteers to go undercover at a local escort service to look for clues, while Smiley decides to moonlight at a taxi driver only to have his uncle's cab damaged by another falling victim.
21	21	"Vamps Like Us"	Vern Gillum	Fred Golan	March 2, 1997
Remy and Anne investigate the murder of a novelist whom was researching a local vampire cult in New Orleans. While Remy tries to find the cult leader and prime suspect, Anne has a meeting of minds with a young research professor whom had a dark past of his own.
22	22	"One Little Indian"	Gilbert M. Shilton	Janet Densmore	March 9, 1997
The death of a band leader in a barroom brawl leads to Smiley's uncle getting arrested on suspicion of the murder. Remy agrees to help Smiley look into the case involving an Marti Gras Indian costume which goes missing from one hand to another which may be connected to a diamond smuggling ring. Smiley at the same time falls head-over-heels for a young investigator, named Corinne, whom is also searching for Smiley's uncle's missing costume.

=== Season 2 (1997) ===
No. overall	No. in season	Title	Directed by	Written by	Original release date
23	1	"A Streetcar with Desire"	William Malone	Robert De Laurentiis	June 22, 1997
Remy investigates the murder of a prominent, but debauched lawyer on a streetcar where he tries to link a mysterious blond waitress (Nicole Eggert) to an exterminator company that the lawyer represented sometime back. Meanwhile, Remy is not too pleased when he is paired with a new trainee, the ambitious, but naive Janine Rebbenack who transfers to the squad, and she quickly annoys Remy with her by-the-book ways of handling the case. Elsewhere, Smiley asks Remy for financial assistance as he prepares to open up his own jazz and blues club.
24	2	"Heavenly Body"	Peter Ellis	Fred Golan	June 29, 1997
Remy is approached by a young woman, named Eve Davenport (Donna D'Errico), who claims to be looking for her missing sister which is connected to the discovery of a body in the delivery van driven a half-witted old friend of Remy's named Joey LaVern, who claims to be working for a shady coffee manufacturer whom is seeking a large sum of stolen money that someone took from him.
25	3	"Moscow on the Mississippi"	William Malone	Alfonse Ruggiero	July 6, 1997
Remy and Janine team up with a shady, alcoholic Russian agent whom is in New Orleans looking for a missing challis which was stolen from a local Russian Orthodox church resulting in the murder of the caretaker. But there's more complications when an equally shady female American Interpool agent, named Mariel Rigg (Tushka Bergen), also arrives looking for the challis and has her own agenda.
26	4	"Platinum Bond"	Peter Ellis	Laurence Frank	July 13, 1997
The discovery of a dead drug dealer in the car truck leads to the arrest of an attractive blond, named Grace (Marla Maples), who claims that she was framed. Remy thinks that Grace is hiding something about a romantic connection to a hopeful senatorial nominee whom is being blackmailed by an unseen third party. Remy discovers that by trying to uncover the blackmail scheme involving Grace, the political candidate Francis Hurley, and Grace's boxer older brother may lead to a political scandal the city may not be prepared for. Meanwhile, Smiley becomes angry when Remy cancels their annual fishing trip in order to concentrate on the case, while Janine continues to deal with the unorthodox Remy's handling of the case his way.
27	5	"Yellow Queen in the Fires of Hell"	Kristoffer Tabori	Eric Overmyer	July 20, 1997
While investigating the murder of a philandering fiancée on the eve of his wedding, Remy becomes acquainted with a former flame, a police psychologist named Dr. Wanda Fallon (Karen Duffy), who wants in on the case which she thinks is the work of a serial killer. Despite that nobody, but Remy, trusts Wanda, he must take it on himself to find the killer as well as a mysterious scruffy man following him who may be connected to a local tarot reader who may hold a clue.
28	6	"Night Music"	Peter Ellis	Alfonse Ruggiero	August 3, 1997
Remy becomes acquainted with a former police academy friend, named Tony (Scott Plank), while investigating the murder of a high-stakes gambler shot by a sniper though his apartment window in which a local street musician, named Peter, finds himself the only witness to the crime and who also has a crush on the murder victim's fiancée, while Remy thinks that a gambler friend of the murder victim may be the next target.
29	7	"A Perfect Day for Buffalo Fish"	Kristoffer Tabori	Fred Golan	August 10, 1997
Remy, Janine, C.D. and the team investigate the shooting spree at a local restaurant where the owner apparently died from sheer fright. But when Remy learns that the victim was in fact poisoned, he sets out to find the culprit. This leads him from the shooting culprit, Angela, whose father was in competition with the murder victim, which leads to a shady produce entrepreneur, whom was in feud with the victim.
30	8	"The Gospel According to McSwain"	Tom DeSimone	Laurence Frank	August 17, 1997
Smiley becomes reacquainted with his former flame Cassandra (Michele Kelly), a gospel/blues singer, whom is the suspect in the murder of a record company mogul that Remy is investigating. When evidence clears Cassandra, Remy puts his focus on other suspects whom include the doorman LaRue as well as a Cassandra's sleazy manager, Dominick, in which Janine decides to go undercover to look for evidence against him.
31	9	"Son o' McSwain"	David Grossman	Neil Cohen	September 7, 1997
A mysterious woman leaves her infant child on the steps of the police station with a note claiming that the baby is Remy's. He is stuck with the infant while Janine, Smiley, C.D. and others takes turns looking after it as he goes out to look for the birth mother. He thinks the mother of the child might be connected to a murdered man found behind the station house.
32	10	"Begirled"	Tom DeSimone	Eric Overmyer	September 21, 1997
Remy is kidnapped by three female escaped convicts (Julie Benz, Rosa Arredondo and Amy D. Jacobson) whom force him to help them look for a half-a-million dollars in cash from a bank robbery in which Remy must try to use his seductive charms to stay alive long enough to stall for time while the ringleader of the female trio, another ex-con named Cyrus St. John (David Fralick), holds a grudge against Remy for putting him away years earlier.
33	11	"End of the World"	Gilbert M. Shilton	Story by : Linda Loiselle Guzik & Eric DelaBarre; Teleplay by : Eric DelaBarre	September 28, 1997
When a bomb explosion at a local health club kills a patron, Remy and the team must find the bomber before he strikes again. But when Janine is taken hostage by the bomber after she accidentally stumbles onto his identity, Remy must race against the clock to find her as well as the bomber's identity, with the help of Smiley's psychic friend Zoey, before he can detonate a much larger bomb, while the captive Janine must try to survive the bomber Luke's physical and mental mind games.
34	12	"Shrimp Stew"	Tom DeSimone	Tom Abraham	October 5, 1997
Remy investigates the murder of a truck driver in a suspected hijacking of a fish truck containing several pounds of illegal shrimp for distribution. But Remy begins to focus more on the owner of the seafood wholesaler, Kristen Mullen (Jennifer Nash), whose company is facing bankruptcy. Meanwhile, Smiley deals with a young Japanese woman, named Yuki (Seiko Matsuda), who arrives at the Blue Spot claiming to be his new mail order bride that one of his regular customers ordered in his name.
35	13	"The Black Bag"	Gilbert M. Shilton	Ra'uf Glasgow	October 12, 1997
Investigating the hit-and-run of a teenage transient, Remy asks Janine to go undercover as a fellow street person to keep an eye on a young teenage runaway, named Maura, whom stumbled upon a mysterious black duffel bag containing $25,000 in cash and who may be targeted by the shady thug whom is connected to a larger plan. Meanwhile, Smiley continues to deal with Yuki running the Blue Spot in her own way. When Yuki decides to return home to Japan, but does not have the money to go back, Smiley decides to throw farewell party for her as part of a fund-raiser for the blue musicians of the area.
