= Felicia Forrester =

- The Bold and the Beautiful character
- Lesli Kay as Felicia Forrester
- Portrayed by: Colleen Dion-Scotti (1990–2004); Lesli Kay (2005–2016)
- Duration: 1990–1992; 1997; 2004–2014; 2016
- First appearance: Episode 703; January 15, 1990
- Last appearance: Episode 7427; September 26, 2016
- Created by: William J. Bell
- Crossover appearances: The Young and the Restless
In-universe information
- Occupation: Head of public relations, marketing and business development at Forrester Creations
- Family: Forrester
- Father: Eric Forrester
- Mother: Stephanie Forrester
- Brothers: Thorne Forrester
- Sisters: Kristen Forrester; Angela Forrester
- Half-brothers: Ridge Forrester; Rick Forrester; Marcus Forrester (adoptive)
- Half-sisters: Bridget Forrester
- Sons: Dino Damiano
- Grandfathers: John Douglas
- Grandmothers: Ann Douglas
- Uncles: John Forrester
- Aunts: Pamela Douglas
- Nephews: Thomas Forrester; R.J. Forrester; Zende Forrester Dominguez (adoptive); Logan Forrester Knight
- Nieces: Steffy Forrester; Phoebe Forrester; Alexandria Forrester; Nicole Marone; Rosie Forrester (adoptive); Lizzy Forrester
- First cousins: Ivy Forrester; Jessica Forrester

Felicia Forrester is a fictional character from the CBS Daytime soap opera The Bold and the Beautiful. Originally portrayed by actress Colleen Dion-Scotti, the role was portrayed on and off by Lesli Kay from November 2005 to 2014, with a brief reappearance in September 2016.

The youngest daughter of Stephanie (Susan Flannery) and Eric Forrester (John McCook), Felicia has one brother, Thorne (Winsor Harmon), and one sister, Kristen Forrester (Terri Ann Linn, Tracy Melchior). She had another sister, Angela who is deceased. She also has three half-siblings: Ridge (Thorsten Kaye), Rick (Jacob Young), and Bridget (Ashley Jones). She is affectionately known as Fifi, a name bestowed on her by her mother's friend, Sally Spectra (Darlene Conley). In March and April 2008, the character made her first crossover to the series' sister series, The Young and the Restless.

== Casting and conception ==
The role of Felicia Forrester was originally cast with actress Colleen Dion-Scotti in 1989; first appearing on January 15, 1990. Dion-Scotti remained until 1992 but briefly returned in 1997. In May 2004, it was announced that Dion-Scotti was again returning in an attempt to "reinvent" the Forresters. That September, the actress was bumped to recurring status due to the actress' commute between the east coast and the west coast, where the series films. In October, the actress announced that she would be exiting the series once again. Her final appearance was on December 4, 2004.

In October 2005, it was announced that another daytime veteran actress, Lesli Kay, had been hired as a recast Felicia. Kay was best known for her roles as Molly Conlan on As the World Turns, and also known as Lois Cerullo on General Hospital. Her first airdate as Felicia was November 30, 2005, opposite Taylor Hayes (Hunter Tylo).

"This is going to be the role of a lifetime, as far as I'm concerned. [...] I'm working at the show that I've been dying to work on forever, with actors that I hugely respect"

— Lesli Kay on being hired as Felicia and working on The Bold and the Beautiful.

In 2008, it was announced that Kay would crossover to The Young and the Restless, in what was considered to be a semi-permanent basis. Kay's crossover to Y&R was short-lived and she returned to her home series. In 2009, it was announced that Kay would make history in becoming the first actress to hold two roles on two separate coasts, when she was announced to be returning to the role of Molly on As the World Turns, while maintaining her role as Felicia. Following the cancellation of As the World Turns, Kay continued appearing on B&B.

In August 2014, Kay reprised her role as Felicia for one episode of The Bold and the Beautiful. A TV Soap reporter said that Kay had no more upcoming appearances scheduled. On September 2, 2016, it was announced that Kay would again reprise her portrayal of Felicia on September 22, 23, and 26.

== Storylines ==
Soon after Felicia's arrival in Los Angeles in 1990, she forges ill-fated relationships with Jake Maclaine (Todd McKee) and Zach Hamilton (Michael Watson). She leaves town in 1992. Felicia returns in 1997 for her parents' wedding, which is called off when Eric's affair with Lauren Fenmore (Tracey E. Bregman) is exposed. After Ridge is arrested for shooting Grant Chambers (Charles Grant), Felicia tries to help exonerate him and attempts to help him reunite with his wife, Taylor Hayes (Hunter Tylo). She is unsuccessful on both counts and leaves town again. After seven years overseas, Felicia returns in July 2004. She has an affair with Nick Marone (Jack Wagner), who soon discovers that Felicia has colon cancer. She has medical tests run and is given the all clear. Felicia realizes that she and Nick will not work out and she leaves for Paris.

Felicia returns a year later with a baby son. She believes the baby is Nick's having named him Dominick. It is revealed that Dominick is the product of a one-night stand with Dante Damiano (Antonio Sabàto, Jr.) in Paris, leaving Nick devastated. Felicia's cancer returns and she "dies" in her mother's arms. However, a faint heartbeat is detected in the ambulance and Stephanie has Felicia secretly transferred to a private clinic, where she eventually has a liver transplant. Felicia fights to survive for her child's sake. Meanwhile, Dante and Bridget, believing that Felicia is dead, begin raising Dominick (who they nicknamed "Dino") as a family. Stephanie eventually reveals to the rest of the family that Felicia is alive. Though ecstatic to have her back, Bridget and Dante prepare to fight Felicia for custody of Dino. However, Dino bonds together Dante and Felicia instead, and Bridget gives up on Dante. Dante proposes to Felicia although he is still in love with Bridget. On their wedding day, Felicia sees Bridget staring at Dante and a heated confrontation ensues. Bridget then admits her love for Dante and they temporarily reunite. Dante and Bridget eventually split again because of her reluctance to have kids right away, and Felicia and Dante get back together. Bridget later finds out that she is pregnant with Dante's child, but she later miscarries the baby; Felicia and Dante support her through the loss. Despite Bridget stepping aside for Felicia to reunite with Dante, an act which solidified the sisters once more, Felicia develops animosity towards Dante, now living in Italy, calling him a loser. Felicia works with Katie Logan (Heather Tom) to try to end the long-time war that had ensued between their families. Felicia clashes with her father when he divorces Stephanie and marries Donna Logan (Jennifer Gareis).

Felicia visits Genoa City to assist Nick Newman (Joshua Morrow) in the launch of Restless Style magazine. While working on the joint campaign, Felicia flirts with Nick, and joins forces with Nick's half-brother Adam (Chris Engen) to break up Nick and his wife Phyllis Summers Newman (Michelle Stafford), which is unsuccessful.

Felicia returns to Los Angeles and allies with Thorne and Ridge to eliminate Donna out of Forrester Creations, because of the supposed bad publicity that the company had received since Eric married Donna (of whom none of them approve of). Their efforts are not well received by Eric, who is angry that his children aren't willing to give Donna a chance. The feud continues and Felicia is fired from her job at Forrester Creations by Donna, though she is later reinstated. Felicia becomes frustrated with her father's choice to name Rick president of the company. She sees the Logan family as having far too much influence over her family's business and feels that her father does not notice her anymore. When it is time for the company to debut its new line, Felicia openly expresses that she partially wishes it would fail so that Eric would see the error in allowing the Logan family to have so much power over Forrester Creations. Felicia contacts Nick expressing a wish to leave her father's company in favor of Jackie M and even offers to rekindle their romance, despite him being engaged to Katie Logan (Heather Tom). It does not happen because Nick is committed to Katie.

Felicia returns in 2010 and learns her mother has cancer, and stays to support the family until Christmas. She again returns in July of the following year for the wedding of Ridge and Taylor—which does not end up happening. Felicia returns in November 2012 for her mother's farewell party, she stays for the funeral and leaves again after spending Christmas with her family. In August 2014, Wyatt Spencer (Darin Brooks), Hope Logan (Kim Matula) and Rick (Jacob Young) visit Felicia at Forrester Creations Paris, ahead of shooting a new promotion in the city. In September 2016, Felicia returns to help her family to stop Eric and Quinn Fuller's (Rena Sofer) wedding.

== Reception ==
Kay's performance in the role earned her a nomination for the Daytime Emmy Award for Outstanding Supporting Actress in a Drama Series in 2007. Luke Kerr from Daytime Confidential expressed excitement for Felicia's 2011 return, writing "This is going to be fun!", and hoped that Felicia "stirs up some trouble while she's back". In 2009, Kerr's colleague, Jamey Giddens, called Kay "ravishing" and speculated that Felicia could be a love interest for Whipple Jones (Rick Hearst). In 2014, Jillian Bowe from the same website called Felicia a "fiesty fashionista and cancer survivor".
