= Providence (American TV series) =

American drama series (1999–2002)

- DVD box set. Clockwise from top left: Lynda, Robbie, Jim, Syd, and Joanie.
- Genre: Medical drama
- Created by: John Masius
- Starring: Melina Kanakaredes; Paula Cale; Seth Peterson; Concetta Tomei; Leslie Silva (1999); Mike Farrell
- Theme music composer: John Lennon and Paul McCartney
- Opening theme: "In My Life" by Chantal Kreviazuk
- Composers: W. G. Snuffy Walden; Bennett Salvay
- Country of origin: United States
- Original language: English
- No. of seasons: 5
- No. of episodes: 96 (list of episodes)

Production
- Executive producers: John Masius; Monica Wyatt; Michael Fresco; Robert De Laurentiis
- Producers: Kevin G. Cremin; Elle Triedman; Antoinette Stella; Rob Fresco; Dana Baratta
- Running time: 44 minutes
- Production companies: John Masius Productions; NBC Studios

Original release
- Network: NBC
- Release: January 8, 1999 – December 20, 2002

Providence is an American medical drama television series that was created by John Masius and ran on NBC from January 8, 1999, to December 20, 2002, airing 96 episodes over the course of five seasons.

== Synopsis ==
The show revolves around Dr. Sydney Hansen (Melina Kanakaredes), who leaves her glamorous job as a plastic surgeon for the rich in Beverly Hills so she can return to her hometown of Providence, Rhode Island, and be with her family. Sydney lives with her father Jim (Mike Farrell), brother Robbie (Seth Peterson), sister Joanie (Paula Cale), and Joanie's baby Hannah in a large home in suburban Providence that also houses her father's veterinary clinic. Sydney's mother Lynda (Concetta Tomei) dies in the first episode but continues to appear to Sydney in her dreams and hallucinations to offer her advice.

The series was cancelled rather abruptly in October 2002 due to a decline in both ratings and viewership. NBC fully intended to bring the show back in January 2003 to resolve a cliffhanger, but these plans were eventually scrapped when some cast members opted out of returning, including Kanakaredes due to being too far along in her second pregnancy with her younger daughter Karina and wanting to focus on both her family and her run in Cabaret. The series concluded with a two-part hostage episode, which was re-written as the finale to include Sydney’s wedding, and with Sydney and her new husband moving to Chicago to give the show proper closure.

== Cast and Characters ==
=== Main ===
- Melina Kanakaredes as Dr. Sydney "Syd" Hansen – A high-profile plastic surgeon who returns home for her sister's wedding. Unfortunately, her mother dies before the ceremony begins. Syd returns to Los Angeles, only to find her boyfriend cheating on her with a man. She ultimately decides to move back home to Providence to help her family, and she takes a job at a free clinic that she later ends up running. While struggling with her new specialty of family medicine while helping her family, she tries to rebuild her love life, without much luck until season 5.
- Paula Cale as Joan "Joanie" Hansen – Sydney's younger sister and single mother of young Hannah. Her mother's death interrupts her wedding and, after giving birth to Hannah, she decides not to marry Hannah's father, Richie. An optimistic woman, Joanie assists her father in his practice until she discovers that her cooking, while unpalatable for humans, is a delicacy for dogs, and she opens a delicatessen bakery for dogs. Her love life, however, is as complicated as her older sister's. Though loyal to her family, Joanie often feels overshadowed by Syd's accomplishments, and they quibble frequently. Joanie senses that her parents, especially her father, tend to favor Syd, so she decides to take over as her father's caregiver after he survives a near-fatal gunshot head wound that was intended for his dog, Fearless. Joanie often makes Syd feel guilty about having her own life and priorities, but as she later learns, it stems from extreme envy. While Joanie admires her sister, she finds herself resenting her sister's sense of freedom.
- Seth Peterson as Robert "Robbie" Hansen – Sydney and Joanie's younger brother. A charming bad boy who manages a pub and is a gambling addict. After much trouble, he finally settles down when he marries Tina, a divorced mother of one, Pete, and later has a son with her, Nicholas "Nick" Hansen.
- Concetta Tomei as Lynda Hansen – Sydney, Joanie, and Robbie's overbearing mother. She dies before her pregnant daughter's wedding service, and afterwards appears only to Syd in dreams, giving her (often unsolicited) advice.
- Leslie Silva as Dr. Helen Reynolds (season 1; guest season 2) – Sydney's friend and the original head of the free clinic. Afterwards, she returns to her hometown, leaving the clinic in Sydney's hands.
- Mike Farrell as Dr. Jim Hansen – Sydney, Joanie, and Robbie's father, a warmhearted veterinarian who runs a clinic in his basement and who occasionally relates better to animals than to people.

=== Recurring ===
- Tom Verica as Kyle Moran (Seasons 1 & 2) – Syd's old high-school sweetheart.
- Nicki Aycox as Lily Gallagher (Season 1) – A troubled teenage girl whom Syd took in to provide her with a better life. While getting her life straightened out, she was called on by her drug dealing ex-boyfriend and killed in a car accident during a high-speed police chase.
- Dana Daurey as Heather Tupperman – Jim's assistant in his veterinary clinic.
- Samaria Graham as Izzy Nunez (Seasons 2-5) – Syd's physician assistant in the free clinic.
- Jon Hamm as Burt Ridley (Seasons 2 & 3) – A firefighter who dated Joanie after saving her from a kitchen fire.
- Maria Pitillo as Tina Calcaterra (Seasons 3-5) – The divorced mother of Pete who met Robbie during one of Pete's hockey games. She later married Robbie, and she gave birth to a son, Nicholas "Nick" Hansen.
- Mickey Toft (Season 3) and Alex D. Linz as Pete Calcaterra (Seasons 3-5) – Tina's son from a previous marriage who later becomes Robbie's stepson.
- Alastair Duncan as Graham Hollings (Season 3) – A reclusive lighthouse keeper with a badly scarred face whom Syd tends for an injury and later convinces him to undergo plastic surgery to fix his face.
- Cress Williams as Dr. Sam Magala (Season 4) – A veterinarian who fills for Jim while he recovers from a gunshot injury to his brain.
- George Newbern as Owen Frank (Seasons 4 & 5) – A lawyer who helped Syd on her malpractice suit. He later began dating Syd, and they got married in the two-part series finale.

== Episodes ==
Season	Episodes	Originally released		Rank	Average viewership (in millions)
Season	Episodes	First released	Last released	Rank	Average viewership (in millions)
1	17	January 8, 1999	May 21, 1999	18	13.9
2	23	September 24, 1999	May 19, 2000	25	13.14
3	22	October 20, 2000	May 18, 2001	43	11.5
4	22	September 28, 2001	May 10, 2002	36	11.4
5	12	October 4, 2002	December 20, 2002	39	10.9

== Production ==
Each episode of the series cost $1.5 million.

== Crew ==
John Masius created the series. Regular writers include Masius, Mike Kelley, Carol Barbee, Elle Triedman, Robert De Laurentiis, Robert Fresco, Tim Kring, Jennifer M. Johnson, and Ann Lewis Hamilton.

== Theme song ==
In the United States and in Canada, the theme song was "In My Life", a cover of the Beatles song performed by Chantal Kreviazuk. Internationally and on the DVD release, the theme song was "You Make Me Home", composed by Tim Truman and performed by Angelica Hayden.

== Home media ==
The Providence Collection, a collection of 12 episodes from the show, was released on DVD in 2004 by Lions Gate Home Entertainment (under license by NBC Entertainment). The four discs contained the following episodes: "Pilot", "Home Again", "Tying the Not", "The Letter", "Don't Go Changin'", "The Thanksgiving Story", "Falling", "Best Man", "Act Naturally", "A New Beginning", "Eye of the Storm" and "The Eleventh Hour".

The release contained several bonus features, including an introduction by creator John Masius, commentaries by Melina Kanakaredes, Paula Cale, Mike Farrell, Michael Fresco, Seth Peterson, Concetta Tomei, Monica Wyatt, and creator John Masius on selected episodes. A gag reel with outtakes and bloopers, and a retrospective documentary featuring new interviews with the cast, creators, and special guests.

Reruns were shown on Fox Family Channel, Lifetime, Lifetime Real Women, and in local syndication on weekends during the 2003-04 season. Seasons 1 and 2 were available to stream on Amazon Prime Video.

International rights to the series were handled by Metro-Goldwyn-Mayer, but has since then been acquired by FilmRise 27 years after the show's original premiere, on January 1, 2026, and is currently the series' new rights holder. North American rights to the series are always handled by NBC Universal.

== Awards and nominations ==
=== Primetime Emmy Awards ===
Recipient	Category	Results	Ref
Sandy Kenyon; Giovanna Ottobre-Melton	Outstanding Costumes for a Series (for episode "Syd in Wonderland")	Won	

=== Hollywood Makeup Artist and Hair Stylist Guild Awards ===
Recipient	Category	Results	Ref
Stacey K. Black; Hana Fruman	Best Innovative Hair Styling – Television (for a Single Episode of a Regular Series – Sitcom, Drama or Daytime) (for episode "He's Come Undone")	Nominated	
Stacey K. Black; Shana Fruman	Best Period Hair Styling – Television (for a Single Episode of a Regular Series – Sitcom, Darma or Daytime) (for episode "He's Come Undone")	Nominated	
James MacKinnon; Stephanie A Fowler	Best Period Makeup – Television (for a Single Episode of a Regular Series –Sitcom, Drama or Daytime) (for episode "He's Come Undone")	Nominated	
James MacKinnon; Stephanie A. Fowler	Best Contemporary Makeup – Television (for a Single Episode of a Regular Series – Sitcom, Drama or Daytime) (for episode "Thank You Providence")	Won	
James MacKinnon; Rela Martine	Best Period Makeup – Television (for a Single Episode of a Regular Series – Sitcom, Drama or Daytime) (for episode "You Can Count On Me")	Nominated	

=== Casting Society of America ===
Recipient	Category	Results	Ref
April Webster; David Bloch	Best Casting for TV, Dramatic Pilot (for episode "Pilot")	Nominated	

=== People's Choice Awards ===
Recipient	Category	Results	Ref
Providence	Favorite Television New Dramatic Series	Won	
