= Mann & Machine =

- Genre: Police procedural; Science fiction
- Created by: Robert De Laurentiis; Dick Wolf
- Starring: David Andrews; Yancy Butler; S. Epatha Merkerson
- Country of origin: United States
- Original language: English
- No. of seasons: 1
- No. of episodes: 9

Production
- Executive producers: Robert De Laurentiis; Dick Wolf
- Producers: Kevin Donnelly; Brooke Kennedy; Glenn Davis; William Laurin
- Running time: 45 minutes
- Production companies: Wolf Films; Universal Television

Original release
- Network: NBC
- Release: April 5 – July 14, 1992

Mann & Machine is an American science fiction/police drama television series that aired for nine episodes on NBC from April 5 to July 14, 1992.

== Synopsis ==
Created by Dick Wolf and Robert De Laurentis, the series starred Yancy Butler as Sgt. Eve Edison, a beautiful police officer who is also a sophisticated gynoid capable of learning and emotion. She is partnered with Det. Bobby Mann (David Andrews), a human officer who disdains robots. Rounding out the regular cast was S. Epatha Merkerson as Capt. Claghorn, Mann and Edison's superior officer.

The series focused on Mann and Edison's criminal investigations in Los Angeles twenty years in the future. An ongoing subplot of the series focused on Eve's continuing education about what makes humans tick, and her ever-growing capacity for emotion, highlighted by the penultimate episode "Billion Dollar Baby" in which Eve is placed in charge of caring for an infant, activating unexpected maternal feelings.

Although Butler received good reviews for her performance in one of her first major roles, the series was criticized heavily, with many comparing it to a failed 1970s comedy series with a similar premise, Holmes & Yoyo. The series was pulled from NBC's schedule after only four episodes. The remaining five were aired in a burnoff as summertime filler.

== Episodes ==
No.	Title	Directed by	Written by	Original release date
1	"Prototype"	Vern Gillum	Robert De Laurentiis (s/t), Dick Wolf (s)	April 5, 1992
Los Angeles Police Detective Bobby Mann is teamed with a cyborg cop named Eve to investigate the murders of international steel brokers. Eve finds evidence that implicates another cop, who is also Mann's childhood friend.
2	"Dating Game"	Bill Corcoran	Glenn Davis (s/t), Robert De Laurentiis (s), William Laurin (t)	April 12, 1992
Eve has her first date, with the prime murder suspect stalking women through a dating service.
3	"No Pain, No Gain"	Brian Grant	Robert De Laurentiis (s), Michael Wagner (s/t)	April 19, 1992
Eve revives an ex-cop, who wants to die, by getting him to help investigate murders committed for body parts.
4	"Water, Water Everywhere"	Allan Arkush	Neil Cohen (t), Glenn Davis (s), Robert De Laurentiis (s), William Laurin (s)	April 26, 1992
Mann's neighbor, a food reporter, investigates the murder of another reporter who broke the story about a contaminated reservoir.
5	"Torch Song"	James A. Contner	Nancy Bond (t), Glenn Davis (s), Robert De Laurentiis (s)	June 9, 1992
Eve's capacity for emotion expands when she makes friends with a singer fearful of a music executive suspected of killing her sister.
6	"Mann's Fate"	James Quinn	William Laurin, Robert De Laurentiis, Glenn Davis	June 16, 1992
Mann moves in with Eve after a psychotic bomber destroys his home, seeking the person who arrested him.
7	"Truth or Consequences"	Armand Mastroianni	Robert De Laurentiis (s), Morgan Gendel (t), Michael I. Wagner (s)	June 30, 1992
Eve learns more about humans while guarding a young girl and her mother, who is to testify against her accountant husband's mobster employers.
8	"Billion Dollar Baby"	Vern Gillum	Robert De Laurentiis (s), Nancy Ann Miller (s/t)	July 7, 1992
A genetically-engineered baby is sought by baby brokers who will kill to find the child. The baby's presence prompts parental instincts in Eve.
9	"Cold, Cold Heart"	James Quinn	Phil Bedard , Larry Lalonde	July 14, 1992
Mann poses as Eve's dying brother to investigate the death of a doctor, who was the only hope for a terminally-ill cryonics scientist.
