= Three Rivers (TV series) =

- Genre: Medical drama
- Developed by: Carol Barbee
- Written by: Carol Barbee
- Starring: Alex O'Loughlin; Katherine Moennig; Daniel Henney; Justina Machado; Christopher Hanke; Amber Clayton; Alfre Woodard
- Composer: Richard Marvin
- Country of origin: United States
- Original language: English
- No. of seasons: 1
- No. of episodes: 13

Production
- Executive producers: Carol Barbee; David Amann; Ted Gold
- Production companies: Fixed Mark Productions; CBS Productions

Original release
- Network: CBS
- Release: October 4, 2009 – July 3, 2010

Three Rivers is an American medical drama television series that aired on CBS from October 4, 2009, to July 3, 2010, and starred Alex O'Loughlin in the role of a famous transplant surgeon in Pittsburgh, Pennsylvania. On November 30, 2009, after just eight episodes of the season had aired Sunday at 9:00 pm (EST), CBS announced that Three Rivers had been pulled from its schedule with no plans to have it returned, and the series was later officially cancelled. However, the remaining unaired episodes were burned off Saturdays at 8:00 pm (EST).

== Development ==
With the long-running NBC drama ER coming to an end, CBS executives put out a call for a new medical show to fill the void. Carol Barbee was introduced via Curtis Hanson to a pitch by Steve Boman, a former transplant coordinator and Chicago newspaper reporter, for a drama about a transplant hospital. Barbee decided to undertake the project, telling it from three points of view: the donor's, the recipient's, and the doctor's. The location for the show's setting in Pittsburgh was decided based on a determination that the University of Pittsburgh Medical Center (UPMC) was the world's leading transplant center with the coincidence that the dominant topographical feature of the city, the confluence of the Allegheny, Monongahela, and Ohio rivers, would provide an allegory for the show's three points of view. Barbee did her research for the show at The Cleveland Clinic with Dr. Gonzalo Gonzalez-Stawinski, who also tutored the show's lead star Alex O'Loughlin. Dr. Robert Kormos, co-director of heart transplantation at UPMC, also provided input. Transplant pioneer Thomas Starzl, who visited the set, is the inspiration for the fictional transplant pioneer who is revealed to be the father of character Dr. Miranda Foster.

The pilot for the Pittsburgh-set medical drama was filmed in western Pennsylvania in March and April 2009 using the closed Brownsville Tri-County Hospital and the David L. Lawrence Convention Center for hospital interior scenes. Post-pilot recasting resulted in actors Julia Ormond and Joaquim de Almeida departing and Alfre Woodard and Amber Clayton joining the series. Ultimately, the pilot was dropped and a new episode was shot for the television premiere. A high-tech, more visually appealing hospital set for the ER and ICU was built on sound stages 19 and 20 at Paramount Pictures, where interior scenes were thereafter produced, although location shooting still occurred in Pittsburgh for exterior shots.

== Cast and characters ==
=== Main ===
- Alex O'Loughlin as Dr. Andrew "Andy" Yablonski, a cardiothoracic surgeon being groomed by Dr. Jordan to take over the transplant department
- Katherine Moennig as Dr. Miranda Foster, a surgical fellow from Philadelphia and daughter of Andy's former mentor Dr. William Foster
- Daniel Henney as Dr. David Lee, an ophthalmology resident and ladies' man
- Christopher Hanke as Ryan Abbott
- Justina Machado as Pam Acosta
- Amber Clayton as Dr. Lisa Reed
- Alfre Woodard as Dr. Sophia Jordan, the no-nonsense head of transplant

=== Supporting ===
- Julia Ormond as Dr. Sophia Jordan, unaired pilot
- Britt Robertson as Brenda Stark
- Nicholas Braun as Michael
- Devika Parikh as Nurse Rekha/Nurse/ER Nurse/ER Nurse #2
- Owiso Odera as Kuol/Kuol Adebe Ketebo
- Joe Holt as Bret/EMT/EMT Bret
- Puja Mohindra as EMT/EMT Lori Goel/Goel/Lori Goel/Marilyn/Medic #3
- Claudia Choi as ICU Nurse/Nurse Chen
- Sabra Williams as Nurse Williams/ER Nurse #1/ER Nurse #2
- Teri Reeves as Nurse Alicia/Alicia/Alicia Wilson/Nurse
- Bruce Katzman as Dr. Richard Strauss
- Mercedes Mason as Vanessa
- Shiloh Fernandez as Scott Barker/Scott
- Rizwan Manji as Dr. Dev/Dr. Drev/Male Doctor
- Louie Alegria as EMT/EMT #1/Medic #1
- Paull Walia as Dr. Inder Patel
- Caryn West as Dr. Susan Heyworth
- William Sadler as Michael Zelasko
- Oded Fehr as Dr. Luc Bovell
- Kelly Overton as Det. Rena Yablonski
- John Bedford Lloyd as Dr. Yorn
- Omid Abtahi as Dr. Yousef Khouri
- B. J. Britt as Antoine/Anton Weathers
- Stacey Scowley as Bullpen Nurse/Bullpen nurse
- Brooklyn McLinn as ER Nurse/ER Nurse #1
- Page Leong as Dr. Margolis/Female Doctor
- Kenny Champion as Eddie Baines/Pat
- Kathleen M. Darcy as Hepatologist
- Lynn Adrianna Freedman as ER Nurse #1/Nurse #1
- Mustafa Haidari as Doctor
- Michelle Diaz as Nurse Liza Salazar/O.R. Nurse
- Aisha Kabia as Melissa
- Noah Fleiss as Sam Heaton

== Episodes ==
No.	Title	Directed by	Written by	Original release date	Prod. code	U.S. viewers (millions)
1	"Ryan's First Day"	Rob Bailey	Carol Barbee	October 4, 2009	101	9.17
Andy and the team try to save an 18-year-old college student in need of a double lung transplant but run into a road block that might not allow her to be eligible for a new set of lungs.
2	"Place of Life"	Christine Moore	Greg Walker	October 11, 2009	102	N/A
Andy tells a young pregnant woman who has peri-partum cardiomyopathy that to save her and her unborn child she must get a heart transplant. However, unexpected complications with the donor's family place the transplant in jeopardy.
3	"Good Intentions"	Rob Bailey	Sunil Nayar	October 18, 2009	104	7.84
After Andy convinces UNOS to give a former drug addict a new heart, things take a turn when the patient disappears right before the surgery.
4	"Code Green"	Christine Moore	David Amann	October 25, 2009	105	7.90
Following a bus crash, the parents of a young college football player must make a heartbreaking decision regarding donation of his organs. Meanwhile, Andy and Ryan rush to find a procurement team to give a man a heart transplant he desperately needs. Special Guest Star: Devon Werkheiser
5	"Alone Together"	Duane Clark	Frank Military	November 1, 2009	103	7.70
Andy tries a risky new procedure on his wife's partner who suffers from an aortic aneurysm.
6	"Where We Lie"	Matt Earl Beesley	Ildy Modrovich	November 8, 2009	106	7.97
Lisa bonds with an 8-year old boy who she saw being crushed by a ride at a fair. Andy and David try to get a patient some much needed medical attention.
7	"The Luckiest Man"	Rob Bailey	Lance Gentile	November 15, 2009	107	8.45
A car crash victim insists he wants to be taken off the life support machine so that he can help others with his organs while Andy and Sophia do all they can to save him. Special Guest Star: Mandy Patinkin
8	"The Kindness of Strangers"	Peter Markle	Jim Adler	November 22, 2009	108	7.65
The wife of a billionaire suffers the consequences after a setback leaves her without a new liver and her husband resorts to buying one on the black market. Meanwhile, a friend from Andy's past resurfaces.
9	"Win-loss"	Daniel Attias	Carol Barbee	June 5, 2010	111	3.07
When a bride is gunned down at her wedding, the team is sent to harvest her lungs to transplant but run into family problems. Meanwhile, a college basketball player about to turn pro is in need of a new heart.
10	"A Roll of the Dice"	Chris Fisher	Greg Walker	June 12, 2010	109	3.13
When a woman's husband needs a new kidney, she contemplates beginning a "Daisy Chain" which means she will donate a kidney to someone and they in turn will donate their kidney until the chain is completed with her husband getting his kidney. Andy is not sure he wants to support such an action and he is concerned that another patient is rejecting his recently transplanted heart. Special Guest Stars: Felicia Day, Arjay Smith
11	"Every Breath You Take"	Rick Bota	Frank Military	June 19, 2010	110	3.04
Dr. Jordon and the others deal with the captain of a firehouse who needs a lung transplant. One of his firefighters must make the tough decision of whether or not she wants to be a living donor. Meanwhile, Andy faces a personal and professional dilemma when his uncle comes to Three Rivers for treatment from a stab wound, but requests that Andy keep it to himself.
12	"Case Histories"	Paul Holahan	Sunil Nayar	June 26, 2010	112	3.29
A plane accident leaves a Korean woman blind, requiring a cornea transplant. A woman discovers that she is not pregnant and, instead, suffers from Ascites. Miranda does everything to save her. Andy is bothered with Luke for trying to experiment with one of his patients.
13	"Status 1A"	Jeff T. Thomas	David Amann	July 3, 2010	113	2.55
Andy puts his patient Kuol at the top of the donor list to receive a new heart after his condition takes a turn for the worse. His transplant is put in jeopardy when police threaten to seize the money raised for Kuol's surgery.
