= The Big Easy (film) =

1986 film by Jim McBride

- Theatrical release poster
- Directed by: Jim McBride
- Screenplay by: Daniel Petrie, Jr.
- Produced by: Stephen J. Friedman
- Starring: Dennis Quaid; Ellen Barkin; Ned Beatty
- Cinematography: Affonso Beato
- Edited by: Mia Goldman
- Music by: Brad Fiedel
- Production company: Kings Road Entertainment
- Distributed by: Columbia Pictures
- Release dates: November 27, 1986 (Rio Film Festival); August 21, 1987 (United States)
- Running time: 100 minutes
- Country: United States
- Language: English
- Budget: $8.5 million
- Box office: $17.6 million

The Big Easy is a 1986 American neo-noir romantic thriller film directed by Jim McBride and written by Daniel Petrie Jr. The film stars Dennis Quaid, Ellen Barkin, John Goodman, and Ned Beatty. The film was both set and shot on location in New Orleans, Louisiana.

The film was later adapted for a television series for two seasons on the USA Network (1996–1997).

== Plot ==
New Orleans police lieutenant Remy McSwain investigates the murder of a local mobster, leading police to suspect a war between two crime families. Anne Osborne, a state district attorney, arrives to investigate alleged police corruption. After seeing firsthand some unorthodox practices by Remy, Anne accuses him of being on the take. He argues that she lacks an understanding of how the system works in New Orleans for police.

Despite Anne's suspicious and apprehensive feelings towards Remy, they form a romantic relationship. When Remy is allegedly caught accepting a payoff in an Internal Affairs sting, a furious Anne has to prosecute him. With Remy's fellow officers' assistance, crucial evidence is destroyed or suppressed, and the charges are dropped, at which point Anne has a conflict between her personal feelings for Remy and her duty to uphold the law.

It is later revealed that Jack Kellom, Remy's boss, who is his mother's fiancé, and detectives DeSoto and Dodge are behind the spate of murders to cover their involvement in heroin smuggling from a boat yard. Kellom goes to the boat that has the drugs, where he is confronted by DeSoto and Dodge. Kellom suggests dumping the drugs; DeSoto and Dodge are strongly opposed, and DeSoto shoots Kellom. Remy and Anne arrive and are confronted by DeSoto and Dodge, and a shootout ensues, resulting in DeSoto being shot by a fatally-wounded Kellom. Remy shoots Dodge with a flare gun, starting a fire; he and Anne barely escape before the boat explodes. The final scene shows Remy carrying Anne into her apartment, then the two dancing; it appears they were just married.

== Cast ==
- Dennis Quaid as Detective Lieutenant Remy McSwain
- Ellen Barkin as Assistant District Attorney Anne Osborne
- Ned Beatty as Captain Jack Kellom
- John Goodman as Detective Sergeant Andre DeSoto
- Lisa Jane Persky as Detective McCabe
- Ebbe Roe Smith as Detective Ed Dodge
- Tom O'Brien as Bobby McSwain
- Charles Ludlam as Lamar Parmentel
- Grace Zabriskie as Mama
- Marc Lawrence as Vinnie "The Cannon" DiMotti
- Solomon Burke as Daddy Mention
- Gailard Sartain as Chef Paul
- Jim Garrison as Judge Jim Garrison
- Bob Kearney as Detective Sergeant Kearney

== Production ==
The original title of the script was "Windy City", and was set in Chicago. The title was briefly changed to "Nothing But The Truth". Filming took 50 days and the lead actors rehearsed three weeks before the start of principal photography.

The city of New Orleans and its atmosphere feature heavily in the film, which opens with an aerial shot of the New Orleans bayou while the cajun band BeauSoleil plays "Zydeco Gris Gris" during the title sequence. To flesh out the mood of the film, the producers used well-known locations such as Tipitina's, Antoine's, Blaine Kern's warehouse full of Mardi Gras parade floats, and a French Quarter strip joint, t. Well-known New Orleans district attorney Jim Garrison, known for his Kennedy assassination conspiracy theories and his own investigation into JFK's murder, makes a cameo appearance as a judge.

== Soundtrack ==
The producers used cajun, zydeco, R&B, and gospel music in the soundtrack. The film's director, Jim McBride, was highly involved in the selection of music, ensuring it was authentic to Cajun culture. An uncredited contributor to the soundtrack was musician David Byrne, who helped McBride locate some of the local artists.

An original motion picture soundtrack album was assembled by label executive Danny Holloway and released in 1987 on the Island label. The album contains twelve tracks including "Tipitina", played by New Orleans pianist Professor Longhair (1974 re-recording from his album Rock 'n' Roll Gumbo in the substantially remixed version produced for its 1985 CD reissue), the New Orleans anthem "Iko Iko," by The Dixie Cups, and a ballad, "Closer to You," written and performed by actor Dennis Quaid who also performs the song in the film. Other performers on the album include Terrance Simien, BeauSoleil, Buckwheat Zydeco, Dewey Balfa, Aaron Neville and The Neville Brothers.

== Distribution ==
The film was first shown in 1986 at various film festivals including the Cognac Festival du Film Policier, the Davao City Film Festival in the Philippines, the Valladolid International Film Festival in Spain, and the Sundance Film Festival before being picked up for distribution. According to Robert Redford, founder of Sundance, The Big Easy was the first film sold at the festival. Redford tells of dragging David Puttnam, then the head of Columbia Pictures, to see the film. After the screening, Puttnam decided to pick up the movie for distribution. The film was released as The Big Crackdown in the Philippines by Season Films and Jemah Films on November 5, 1988.

=== Home media ===
The Big Easy was first released on VHS in 1988 by HBO Video. On February 2, 1999, a video and DVD of the film were released on the Trimark label as part of the label's "Gold Reel Collection." In 2004, it was re-released on DVD by Cinema Club. It was released on Blu-ray by Kino Lorber on April 4, 2023

== Reception ==
=== Box-office ===
The film had a limited opening on August 21, 1987, and grossed $353,259. It widened a week where its gross was $3,626,031 from 1,138 screens, and the total receipts for the run were $17,685,307. In its widest release, the film was featured in 1,219 theaters. The motion picture was in circulation five weeks.

=== Critical response ===
The review aggregator Rotten Tomatoes reported that 90% of critics gave the film a positive review, based on 39 reviews. The critics consensus reads, "Loaded with atmosphere and drenched in the sizzling chemistry between Dennis Quaid and Ellen Barkin, The Big Easy remains one of the strongest—and steamiest—thrillers of the 1980s." On Metacritic — which assigns a weighted mean score — the film has a score of 77 out of 100 based on 10 critics, indicating "generally favorable reviews". Audiences polled by CinemaScore gave the film an average grade of "B" on an A+ to F scale.

Roger Ebert, film critic of the Chicago Sun-Times, lauded the film, and wrote, "The Big Easy is one of the richest American films of the year. It also happens to be a great thriller. I say 'happens,' because I believe the plot of this movie is only an excuse for its real strength: the creation of a group of characters so interesting, so complicated and so original they make a lot of other movie people look like paint-by-number characters."

Sheila Benson, writing for the Los Angeles Times, wrote, "Screenwriter Daniel Petrie Jr. sets up the conflict, and director Jim McBride fleshes it out with devastating, sexy assurance..."

Film critic Vincent Canby was a bit tougher on the film, writing "Remy and Anne are made for each other, or would have been if The Big Easy were the sophisticated comedy it could have been...[the film] was directed by Jim McBride who one day is going to come up with a commercial movie that works all the way through, and not just in patches."

Quaid's Cajun accent, which he meticulously researched in preparation for the role, was considered "cringe-inducing" by locals.

=== Accolades ===
==== Wins ====
- 1987: Cognac Festival du Film Policier, Cognac, France: Grand Prix
- 1987: Valladolid International Film Festival: Best Actor, Dennis Quaid
- 1988: Independent Spirit Awards: Best Male Lead Dennis Quaid
- 1988: Sant Jordi Awards: Best Foreign Actress, Ellen Barkin
- 1988: Anthony Award: Best Movie

==== Nominations ====
- 1988: Independent Spirit Awards: Best Director, Jim McBride; Best Feature, Stephen J. Friedman
- 1988: Casting Society of America: Artios Award; Best Casting for Feature Film, Drama, Lynn Stalmaster and David Rubin
- 1988: Edgar Allan Poe Awards: Edgar; Best Motion Picture, Daniel Petrie Jr.

== Television adaptation ==
The film inspired its television series, which premiered on the USA Cable Network August 11, 1996. Tony Crane played McSwain and Susan Walters played Anne Osbourne. There were approximately 35 episodes broadcast over two seasons. Although Daniel Petrie Jr. (who wrote the screenplay to the original film) was credited as an executive producer of the series, Petrie has stated that he was "not at all" involved in the series, receiving only "a credit and money".
