= Colleen Dion-Scotti =

American actress

- Occupation: Actress
- Years active: 1985–2004
- Notable work: The Bold and the Beautiful
- Spouse(s): Steven Jensen (1988–1993); Lawrence "Larry" Scotti (1996–2014)Divorced 2020
- Children: Lawrence G Scotti, Viviana Scotti

Colleen Dion-Scotti (December 26, 1964, also credited as Colleen Dion) is an American actress. She is best known for her portrayal of Felicia Forrester on the CBS soap opera, The Bold and the Beautiful, a role she played from 1990 to 1992, in 1997, and from July to December 2004.

== Filmography ==
Film and television
Year	Title	Role	Notes
1985–86	Search for Tomorrow	Evie Stone	TV series
1986–1988	Loving	Cecilia Thompson Sowolsky	TV series
1989	Santa Barbara	Robert's Lover	"1.1315"
1990	Equal Justice	Hostess	"A Sucker's Bet"
1990	Fatal Charm	Cowboy's Girlfriend	Video
1990–92, 1997, 2004	The Bold and the Beautiful	Felicia Forrester	Recurring role
1992–1994	Another World	Brett Gardner	TV series
1998–2001	All My Children	Leslie Coulson	TV series
2001–02	As the World Turns	Dahlia Ventura	TV series
2003	Guiding Light	Ramona Hendon	TV series
