= Alfred Hitchcock Presents (1985 TV series) =

American anthology television series (1985–1989)

- Title card
- Genre: Horror; Drama; Mystery; Thriller; Crime
- Presented by: Alfred Hitchcock (colorized stock footage)
- Country of origin: United States
- Original language: English
- No. of seasons: 4
- No. of episodes: 76 (list of episodes)

Production
- Executive producers: Christopher Crowe; Jon Slan; Michael Sloan
- Producers: Alan Barnette; Mary Kahn; Barbara Laffey; David Levinson; Susan Whittaker
- Production locations: Toronto, Ontario, Canada
- Camera setup: Multi-camera
- Running time: 22 minutes
- Production companies: Universal Television; Michael Sloan Productions; Paragon Motion Pictures, Inc.

Original release
- Network: NBC
- Release: September 29, 1985 – May 4, 1986
- Network: USA Network
- Release: January 24, 1987 – July 22, 1989

Related
- Alfred Hitchcock Presents

Alfred Hitchcock Presents, sometimes called The New Alfred Hitchcock Presents, is an American television anthology series that originally aired on NBC for one season from September 29, 1985, to May 4, 1986, and on the USA Network for three more seasons, from January 24, 1987, to July 22, 1989, with a total of four seasons consisting of 76 episodes. The series is an updated version of the 1955 series of the same name.

== Background ==
In 1985, NBC aired a new made-for-television film based upon the series, combining newly filmed stories with colorized footage of Alfred Hitchcock from the original series introducing each segment. The segments were "Incident in a Small Jail," adapted and directed by Joel Oliansky, "Man from the South," adapted and directed by Steve De Jarnatt, "Bang! You're Dead!," adapted by Harold Swanton and Christopher Crowe and directed by Randa Haines, and "An Unlocked Window," adapted and directed by Fred Walton. The film was a ratings success.

== Format ==
A new Alfred Hitchcock Presents series debuted on September 29, 1985 and retained the same format as the film – newly filmed stories (a mixture of original works and updated remakes of original series episodes) with colorized introductions by Hitchcock. The new series lasted only one season before NBC cancelled it, but it was then produced for three more seasons by USA Network (which is now co-owned with NBC under NBCUniversal), and shifted production from Los Angeles to Toronto, where the show's new Canadian producing partner Paragon Motion Pictures was based, along with several budget cuts to the series. Directors who helmed episodes included Tim Burton, David Chase, Burt Reynolds, Atom Egoyan, Joan Tewkesbury, and Thomas Carter.

== Production ==
Despite garnering good reviews, NBC cancelled Alfred Hitchcock Presents as, according to then NBC Entertainment President Brandon Tartikoff, the series didn't pair well with Amazing Stories on Sunday nights. Parents looking for an "electronic babysitter" for their children were taken aback by the colorful whimsy filled fantasies presented in Amazing Stories that would then segue into stories of murder on Alfred Hitchcock Presents. With parents opting to put on ABC's Wonderful World of Disney, which started before Alfred Hitchcock Presents, for uninterrupted family viewing, Amazing Stories' target audience was being siphoned off. The series was saved from cancellation by USA Network who had been running the original Alfred Hitchcock Presents and ordered a 13 episode second season.

== Episodes ==
Season	Episodes	Originally released		
Season	Episodes	First released	Last released	Network
Pilot film	4	May 5, 1985		NBC
1	22	September 29, 1985	May 4, 1986	NBC
2	13	January 24, 1987	April 18, 1987	Syndication
3	21	February 6, 1988	August 6, 1988	Syndication
4	20	October 8, 1988	July 22, 1989	Syndication

== Notable guest stars ==
=== Series pilot ===
- Ned Beatty as Larry Broome (segment "Incident in a Small Jail")
- Lee Ving as Curt Venner (segment "Incident in a Small Jail")
- Tony Frank as Sheriff Noakes (segment "Incident in a Small Jail")
- John Huston as Carlos / The Narrator (segment "Man from the South")
- Melanie Griffith as Girl (segment "Man from the South")
- Annette O'Toole as Stella (segment "An Unlocked Window")
- Bruce Davison as Betty Ames / Baker (segment "An Unlocked Window")
- Richard Lineback as Billy (segment "Incident in a Small Jail")
- Steven Bauer as Gambler (Segment "Man from the South")
- Tippi Hedren as Waitress (Segment "Man from the South")
- Kim Novak as Rosa (Segment "Man from the South")
- Lyman Ward as Uncle Jack (Segment "Bang! You're Dead!")
- Bill Mumy as Supermarket Clerk (Segment "Bang! You're Dead!")
- Jonathan Goldsmith as Manager (Segment "Bang! You're Dead!")
- Helena Kallianiotes as Maria Kyprianov (Segment "An Unlocked Window")

=== Other episodes ===
- Ian Abercrombie as Doctor
- Karen Allen as Jackie Foster
- Melissa Sue Anderson as Laura Donovan, Julie Fenton
- Richard Anderson as Tom Northcliff
- Susan Anton as Diane Lewis
- John Aprea as Fisher
- Vaughn Armstrong as Marine
- Elizabeth Ashley as Karen Lawson / Kate Lawson
- Harvey Atkin as Sam Wicks
- Tom Atkins as Police Lieutenant
- Barbara Babcock as Cissie Enright
- Paul Bartel as Art Critic
- Steven Bauer as Gambler
- Brian Bedford as Sherlock Holmes, Stewart Dean
- Dirk Benedict as Dr. Rush
- Robby Benson as Ed
- Sandra Bernhard as Karen
- Tony Bill as Steve
- Yannick Bisson as Ty
- Roger Aaron Brown as Joe Chandler
- Lee Bryant as Phyllis
- James T. Callahan as Everett
- Rory Calhoun as Jimmie Thurson
- Virginia Capers as Ruth
- Timothy Carhart as Rick
- Robert Carradine as Jerry
- Bernie Casey as Bernie
- David Cassidy as Joey Mitchell
- Shaun Cassidy as Dale Thurston
- Richard Chamberlain as Clay Medwick
- Michael Paul Chan as Denning
- Linden Chiles as Judge
- David Clennon as Professor John Tate
- John Colicos as Carter Talbot
- Lewis Collins as Bill Stewart
- Mike Connors as Robert Logan
- Nicolas Coster as Phil
- Ronny Cox as Sam Medwick
- Jonathan Crombie as Rick Garrison
- Brett Cullen as Cooper
- Jennifer Dale as Betty Jo Bennington
- Tim Daly as Scott
- Lawrence Dane as Joe Metcalf, Mr. Adams
- Brad Davis as Arthur
- Bruce Davison as Betty Ames / Man
- Danny Dayton as Buzzy Carelli
- George DiCenzo as Defence Attorney
- Gill Dennis as Dr. Leon Borofsky
- Sandy Dennis as Helen
- Shirley Douglas as Monica Logan
- Robert Dryer as Thief #1
- David Dukes as Dr. Tom Rigby
- Griffin Dunne as Knoll
- Steve Eastin as Police Captain
- Samantha Eggar as Lisa Talbot
- David James Elliott as Ted
- Ross Elliott as Mr. Baker
- Erik Estrada as Vinnie Pacelli
- Greg Evigan as David Whitmore
- Jeff Fahey as Ray Lee
- Linda Fiorentino as Betsy Van Kennon
- Darlanne Fluegel as Zoe
- Ken Foree as Orderly
- Anthony Franciosa as Morris Conrad
- Don Francks as Sergeant Jim Wells
- Diane Franklin as Paula / Paulette
- Alan Fudge as Wells
- Andy Garcia as Alejandro
- Stefan Gierasch as Carl
- Panchito Gómez as Vernon
- Bruce Gray as Bryan Holland
- Melanie Griffith as Girl
- Harry Guardino as Phil Mansfield
- Michael C. Gwynne as Bus Driver
- Arsenio Hall as Cleavon
- Rich Hall as Edgar / Eddie
- Mark Hamill as Danny Carlyle
- Jerry Hardin as The Warden
- Mel Harris as Girlfriend
- Noel Harrison as Charles Blanchard
- Peter Haskell as Paul Foley
- John Heard as Bill Callahan
- Marilu Henner as Claire
- Buck Henry as Walter Lang
- Edward Herrmann as Dr. Maxwell Stoddard
- Barbara Hershey as Jessie Dean
- Art Hindle as Alton Brooks
- Basil Hoffman as Dr. Michaels
- Barclay Hope as Harvey
- Season Hubley as Lena Trent ft
- Rif Hutton as Policeman #1
- George Innes as Charles Dean
- Michael Ironside as Lieutenant Rick Muldoon
- Herbert Jefferson Jr. as Police Officer
- Van Johnson as Art Bellasco
- William Katt as Dr. Burke
- Yaphet Kotto as Convict
- Clyde Kusatsu as Detective
- Don Lake as A.C. Boone
- Martin Landau as Wallace Garrison
- Robert Lansing as G. William Howe
- George Lazenby as James (Bond)
- Lillian Lehman as Judge Branca
- Fiona Lewis as Erica
- Cec Linder as Dr. Hoffman
- Ernie Lively as Policeman #2
- Robert Loggia as Charley
- Adelle Lutz as Lin Chin
- Ann-Marie MacDonald as Denise Tyler
- Stephen Macht as Carl Cansino
- Patrick Macnee as Thaddeus
- Richard Marcus as Levy
- E. G. Marshall as Charlie Pitt
- Pamela Sue Martin as Melinda Jensen
- Lois Maxwell as Ms. Golden
- Michelle Marsh as Woman In Bookstore
- Frances Lee McCain as Dr. Marion Campbell
- David McCallum as Lieutenant Cavanaugh
- Sheila McCarthy as Sarah Hollister
- Doug McClure as Clete Madden
- Kenneth McMillan as Judge Paul Magrew
- Vera Miles as Lady
- Neil Munro as David Barclay
- Anthony Newley as Phil Halloran
- Laraine Newman as Periwinkle
- Kim Novak as Rosa
- Michael O'Keefe as Art Toomey
- Annette O'Toole as Stella
- Amy Sherman-Palladino as Female Student #1
- Barry Pearl as Assistant District Attorney
- Lisa Pelikan as Nurse Ellen Hatch
- Susan Peretz as Neighbor
- Michelle Phillips as Katherine Clark
- Joaquin Phoenix as Pagey Fisher
- Cindy Pickett as Marcia Loomis
- Cliff Potts as Roger Harden
- Robert Prosky as Dr. Sutton A. Vogel
- Nicholas Pryor as Mr. Ryan
- Linda Purl as Lisa Tate
- Kathleen Quinlan as Ann Foley, Karen Wilson
- Cristina Raines as Julie Randall
- Kate Reid as Johanna Enright
- Duncan Regehr as David Harrison
- Clive Revill as Hector
- Gloria Reuben as Pam
- Deborah Richter as Kathy
- Wayne Robson as Chief Pickett
- Marion Ross as Margaret Sturdevant
- Joseph Ruskin as Dr. Kaufman
- Mia Sara as Sara Fletcher
- Michael Sarrazin as Lieutenant Steven Rykker
- John Saxon as Garth December
- Doug Savant as Joey Medwick
- Dwight Schultz as David Powell
- Anne Seymour as Esther
- Carolyn Seymour as Carla Dean
- Ted Shackelford as Garret / Jason Cook
- John Shea as Brian Whitman
- Martin Sheen as Paul Dano
- Stephen Shellen as Garson
- Reid Shelton as Daniels
- Jean Simmons as Margaret Lowen
- Cedric Smith as Paul Stevens
- Lane Smith as Robert Warren
- David Soul as Michael Dennison
- Brent Stait as Jim Sweeney
- Jessica Steen as Sally Carlyle
- Stella Stevens as Georgia Brooks
- Parker Stevenson as Clark Taylor
- Catherine Mary Stewart as Rachel Jenkins
- Dennis Cleveland Stewart as Thief #2
- Kristy Swanson as Female Student #2
- Lyle Talbot as Mr. Fletcher
- Leigh Taylor-Young as Adelaide Walker
- Victoria Tennant as Bride
- Jack Thibeau as Joe
- Michael Tucker as Frank
- John Vernon as Mr. Brenner
- Kate Vernon as Donna
- Lee Ving as Curt Venner
- Nana Visitor as Doris
- Lindsay Wagner as Susan Forrester
- Eli Wallach as Yosef Kandinsky
- Al Waxman as Dale Linesman
- Patrick Wayne as Michael Roberts
- Barbara Williams as Maggie Verona
- Simon Williams as Arthur Hollister
- Rod Wilson as Eddie
- Jeff Wincott as Tom King
- Edward Woodward as Drummond
- Burt Young as Ed Fratus, The Salesman
- Adrian Zmed as Edgar Kraft
