= Vern Gillum =

American television director

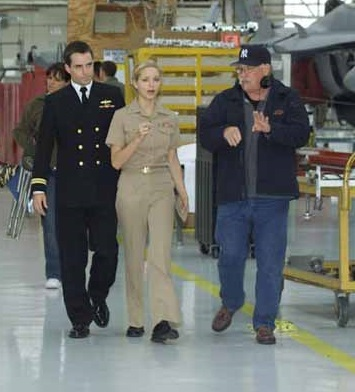
- Vern Gillum (right) goes over a scene with Chris Beetem and Jordana Spiro, for JAG in 2005
- Occupation(s): Television director and producer
- Years active: 1987–current

Vern Gillum is an American television director.

After attending California School of Fine Arts and graduating from Art Center School in Los Angeles, He went into advertising at McCann Erickson, LA/NY. Assc. Creative Director, Director of West Coast Production, and was on the special projects creative team for Interpublic's Professional Advisory Board, New York. He later became Creative Director at Carson Roberts/Ogilvy Mather. Following his stint in advertising and prior to 1990 he established Vern Gillum & Friends Inc., where he produced and directed hundreds of commercials (among others, for McDonald's, General Foods, American Express, General Motors, Mattel) and short subjects throughout the US and around the globe, through his offices in Hollywood and New York. During this period he won gold medals in New York, Chicago, Los Angeles, San Francisco, Clios and numerous Clio nominations, the U.S Film Festival, and International Film Festivals. In 1988, Michael Mann hired him as the first West Coast commercial director to direct Miami Vice. His episodic directorial work includes a number of episodes from each of the television series Firefly, The Big Easy, The Untouchables, Angel, Profiler, Sliders, Law & Order and Pros and Cons. His work includes a number of episodes from dozens of television series, including, amongst others, ER, Prison Break, Walker, Texas Ranger, The Commish, Prey, Haunted, The Twilight Zone, JAG, Nash Bridges, Gabriel's Fire, Baywatch and Under Suspicion. From 1996 to 1997, Gillum was a supervising producer on the series The Big Easy. In 2006, Gillum turned to the creation and production of his own shows. Currently, Apache, a dramatic series and graphic novel, is in pre-production.
