= Carol Barbee =

American actress (born 1959)

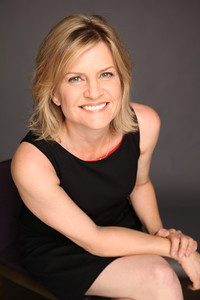
- Carol Barbee
- Born: Carol Denise Barbee; May 22, 1959 (age 67); Concord, North Carolina
- Education: Wake Forest University (BA); University of California, Los Angeles (MFA)
- Occupations: Film, television actor, writer, producer
- Spouse: Carlos Lacamara
- Children: 2

Carol Denise Barbee (born May 22, 1959, in Concord, North Carolina) is an Emmy winning American television writer, actress and producer.

== Early life ==
Barbee graduated from Central Cabarrus High School in Concord, North Carolina. She graduated from Wake Forest University with a BA in Speech, Communications and Theater Arts and later received her MFA in Acting from UCLA.

Her mother was a singer in a gospel quartet at their local church. She has a sister, Cathy Barbee, who currently resides in Charlotte, NC and a brother, Jeff Barbee, who resides in Concord, NC. Her late father, W.C. Barbee, was President of Teamsters Local Union #71 in Charlotte. NC.

== Career ==
=== Acting ===
Carol Barbee got her first role in L.A. Law, and has appeared in other TV shows such as JAG, Northern Exposure and Ellen, as well as movies such as Die Hard 2 and Out to Sea.

=== Writing ===
In 2001, Barbee wrote her first credited script for NBC's Providence, and has since written for Judging Amy (where she also served as executive producer and head writer), Close to Home, and was the executive producer for the CBS series Jericho, Swingtown, and Three Rivers and the Fox one hour drama, Touch. She served as a consulting producer and writer for TNT's Falling Skies., Hawaii Five-O for CBS and USA Networks' limited series, DIG. She served as the Executive Producer/Showrunner of UnREAL Season 2 and Girlfriends Guide to Divorce. She is the Series Creator, Executive Producer and Showrunner of Netflix's series, Raising Dion and served as writer and Consulting Producer on Netflix' Emmy winning series, Dash & Lily.

== Personal life ==
She is married to actor Carlos Lacámara. They have two sons, Lucas and Diego.

== Filmography ==
- Die Hard 2 (1990) - Newscaster (WZDC)
- The Apocalypse (1997) - Lieutenant Robing
- Out to Sea (1997) - Flight Attendant
