= Jim Tauber =

American film executive and producer (1950–2025)

- Born: June 20, 1950; Illinois, U.S.
- Died: January 22, 2025 (aged 74)
- Occupations: Film executive; producer
- Years active: 1980s–2015
- Spouse: Laura Newman
- Children: 3

Jimmy Tauber (1950 – January 22, 2025) was an American film executive and producer. Throughout his career; he worked for Columbia TriStar, Gramercy Pictures, Propaganda Films, 20th Century Fox, Anonymous Content, and Sidney Kimmel Entertainment, where he was the president and chief operating officer from July 2005 until his retirement in April 2015.

== Biography ==
=== Early life and career ===
Tauber was born in Illinois in 1950, and grew up in Glencoe.

Tauber was executive vice president of acquisitions and business/legal affairs at Columbia TriStar Pictures. At Columbia; he oversaw the acquisitions, sales agreements and production of more than 50 features, including Sex, Lies, and Videotape, The Waterdance and Gas Food Lodging. Tauber later worked at Propaganda Films, where he was president and chief operating officer. At Propaganda, he produced 30 films, including Wild at Heart and Being John Malkovich and helped launch Gramercy Pictures. Tauber also helped launch Anonymous Content, eventually serving as its president and chief operating officer. While working at 20th Century Fox, he was the vice president of acquisitions and co-productions. Tauber later joined Sidney Kimmel Entertainment in July 2005, where he oversaw the productions of more than 30 films, including Lars and the Real Girl, Death at a Funeral, The Place Beyond the Pines, Hell or High Water and The Age Of Adaline until his retirement.

=== Later life and death ===
A member of the Academy of Motion Picture Arts and Sciences, Tauber retired from the film industry in April 2015, later practicing as a licensed psychotherapist. He also operated a coffeeshop in Los Olivos, California, which he co-launched with his wife in January 2022. In Los Olivos, Tauber also managed a vineyard.

Tauber was married to Laura Newman and had three children. He died of complications from multiple myeloma on January 22, 2025, at age 74.
