= John Penotti =

American film and television producer

John Penotti is an American film and television producer known for his work in both Hollywood and international markets. In 2013, he founded Ivanhoe Pictures, a company specializing in local-language productions. Ivanhoe later merged with Sidney Kimmel Entertainment, forming SK Global Entertainment, where Penotti served as a founder and CEO. SK Global was acquired by London-based investment firm Centricus in 2022.

Penotti is recognized for producing Crazy Rich Asians, directed by Jon M. Chu, a film notable for its all-Asian cast and significant impact on Hollywood's approach to diversity. The movie achieved commercial success, ranking among the highest-grossing romantic comedies and is credited with fostering a renewed interest in diverse, culturally-centered storytelling.

Penotti's work extends across numerous regions, including Asia, Europe, and Latin America, where he has developed and produced content in various local languages. His projects include the Netflix series Thai Cave Rescue, the acclaimed Korean thriller The Wailing, and the Hindi-language Delhi Crime, which won an International Emmy. Other notable productions include Hell or High Water, a 2017 Academy Award nominee for Best Picture, and Greta, directed by Neil Jordan. Through partnerships in China, Thailand, India, South Korea, and beyond, Penotti has played a prominent role in bridging talent and resources between Hollywood and international film industries.

== Personal life ==
Penotti was born in Paterson, New Jersey. He is a graduate of Tufts University, Summa Cum Laude.

== Filmography ==
=== Film ===
Year	Film
2023	Virgo and the Sparklings
2022	Sri Asih
2022	Lara Ati
2022	Final Cut
2021	Akhirat: A Love Story
2021	The Box
2021	India Sweet and Spices
2020	Betaal
2019	The Jesus Rolls
2019	Impetigore
2019	The Sky is Pink
2019	Strange But True
2018	Cities of Last Things
2018	Greta
2018	Ghoul
2018	Crazy Rich Asians
2017	Brad’s Status
2017	Another Shot
2017	The Book of Henry
2016	Hell or High Water
2016	The Wailing
2015	Bride Wars
2015	Intimate Enemies
2014	Slow Video
2013	All is Bright
2013	Movie 43
2011	Violet & Daisy
2010	Frozen
2009	Tenderness
2009	Balls Out: Gary the Tennis Coach
2008	The Midnight Meat Train
2007	Awake
2007	Feast of Love
2007	Meet Bill
2006	Wedding Daze
2006	Once in a Lifetime: The Extraordinary Story of the New York Cosmos
2006	A Prairie Home Companion
2005	Slow Burn
2005	Romance & Cigarettes
2004	Saving Face
2004	Yes
2003	Uptown Girls
2002	Swimfan
2002	Just a Kiss
2001	Piñero
2001	The Château
2001	In the Bedroom
2000	Lisa Picard is Famous
1998	Illuminata
1998	A Price Above Rubies
1996	I’m Not Rappaport

=== Television ===
Year	Title
2019-2024	Dehli Crime, Seasons 1-3
2023	The Talent Agency
2022	Thai Cave Rescue
