= Picking Cotton (book) =

2009 memoir

Picking Cotton: Our Memoir of Injustice and Redemption
- Author: Jennifier Thompson-Cannino; Ronald Cotton; Erin Torneo
- Language: English
- Genre: Autobiography, Memoir
- Publisher: St. Martin's Griffin
- Publication date: March 3, 2009
- Publication place: United States
- Media type: Print (hardcover)
- Pages: 320
- ISBN: 978-0312599539

Picking Cotton: Our Memoir of Injustice and Redemption, also known as Picking Cotton, is a 2009 memoir written by Jennifier Thompson-Cannino, Ronald Cotton, and Erin Torneo and published by St. Martin's Griffin. It chronicles the events during and after July 29, 1984 from the rape of Thompson-Cannino to her and Cotton joining together for philanthropy awareness efforts of eyewitness testimony. A film adaptation was announced in February 2010.

== Overview ==
On July 29, 1984, 24-year-old Jennifier Thompson-Cannino was trying to go to sleep when she suddenly heard the sound of a bulb breaking outside, shortly discovering thereafter that someone was in the house. The stranger rapes her at knifepoint, Thompson-Cannino closely studying the features and voice of her perpetrator in hopes of being able to catch him later. Eventually, tricking him by saying that she needs to get a drink of water, she escapes down the street and walks into the police station.

After three days she is shown a police lineup of African-American men on two separate occasions, both photo and physical, pointing out Ronald Cotton as her perpetrator each time. After Cotton gives a false alibi, having confused his weekends, he is sent to jail. While in jail Cotton works in the kitchen area and stays there for a consecutive eleven years until a convict, Bobby Poole enters and works in the kitchen. The two men are frequently confused for one another and at one point Poole admits to having done the rapes.

Cotton begs his lawyer to go through with DNA testing, transcending the knowledge that DNA is irrefutable proof and if it returned his results he was apt to serve the whole sentence, but nevertheless his lawyer pushes the police to test semen DNA with Cotton's. It is not a match. Soon after Cotton is freed. Thompson-Cannino is in awe and shock, still believing Cotton to have been the perpetrator of the crime.

After about a week or so of contemplation Cotton and Thompson-Cannino agree to meet at a church and reconcile. Upon Cotton's arrival Thompson-Cannino begs for his forgiveness, to which he gracefully accepts.

== Reception ==
Picking Cotton has been praised by the United States Department of Justice. A review in Mother Jones praised the book's message, but criticized it for its "purple" and "clichéd" prose. A review in Publishers Weekly described the book as "well-modulated and generously balanced", while a review in Kirkus Reviews wrote that the book was heartfelt and would educate its readers about the criminal justice system. In a review in the journal Law, Culture and the Humanities, Judith Ferster described the book as moving.

== Film adaptation ==
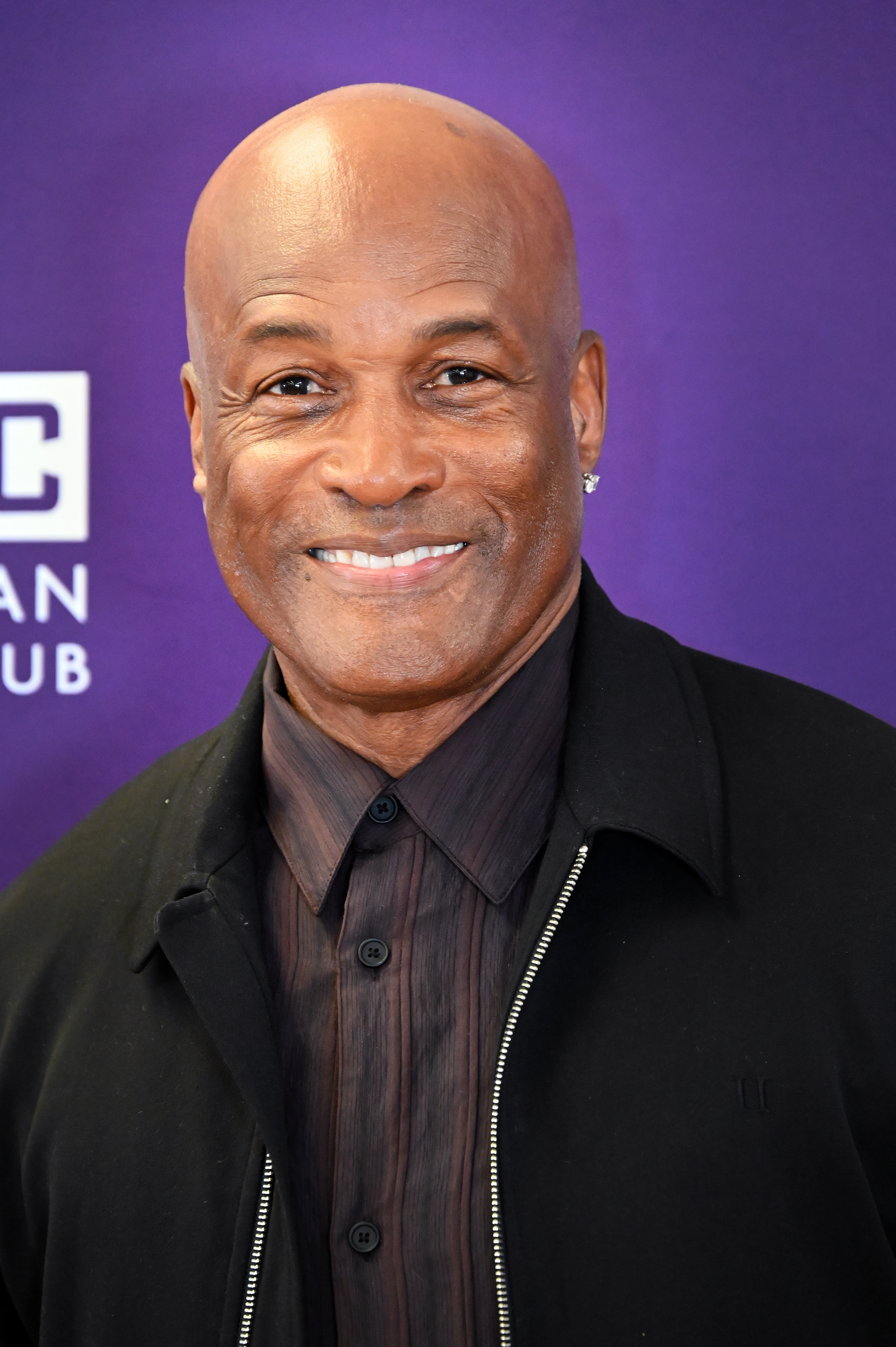
The director Kenny Leon was originally slated to direct.

On 10 February 2010, it was reported by Variety that a film adaptation of Picking Cotton was being produced by David Friendly, Mark Clayman, and Michael Menche, with Todd Komarnicki penning the screenplay. It was announced later that September that Broadway director Kenny Leon would direct.

Development on the project stalled for about nine years before it was announced that Jessica Sanders would instead be directing, with Sidney Kimmel, John Penotti, and Sanders producing. It was also stated that the screenplay had been penned by David Birke and Tony Mosher.
