= Stand Up Guys =

2012 American black comedy-crime film by Fisher Stevens

- Theatrical release poster
- Directed by: Fisher Stevens
- Written by: Noah Haidle
- Produced by: Sidney Kimmel; Tom Rosenberg; Gary Lucchesi; Jim Tauber
- Starring: Al Pacino; Christopher Walken; Alan Arkin; Julianna Margulies
- Cinematography: Michael Grady
- Edited by: Mark Livolsi
- Music by: Lyle Workman
- Production companies: Sidney Kimmel Entertainment; Lakeshore Entertainment
- Distributed by: Lionsgate
- Release dates: October 12, 2012 (CIFF); February 1, 2013 (United States)
- Running time: 95 minutes
- Country: United States
- Language: English
- Budget: $15 million
- Box office: $6.1 million

Stand Up Guys is a 2012 American dark comedy crime film directed by Fisher Stevens and starring Al Pacino, Christopher Walken and Alan Arkin. The film was released in North America on February 1, 2013. The term "stand-up guy" is an American phrase meaning a loyal and reliable friend.

== Plot ==
Doc picks up his old friend Val from prison. At Doc's apartment, while Val is in the bathroom, Doc approaches him with a gun but does nothing. They go for coffee, and Val says that he wants to "party". They go to a brothel, but Val cannot perform, so Doc and Val break into a pharmacy and steal several bottles of drugs. Val takes a lot of medication for erectile dysfunction, and he has sex with a prostitute named Oxana, after which they go to a nightclub, while Val takes some of the other drugs to get a buzz. Val passes out in the car and Doc again considers killing him, but instead takes him to the hospital.

They see nurse Nina Hirsch, the daughter of their old friend and getaway driver Richard, who tells them that he lives in a retirement home. Thereafter, they go to a local diner, where Val correctly guesses that Doc is hired to kill him. Doc says that he has been given until 10 a.m. to do the job, or else he will be killed as well. Outside, they steal a car and pick up Richard, who takes the wheel and goes into a highway chase with the police. When Richard desires his first threesome, the men return to the brothel to fulfill his wish, although he feels guilty about it despite being a widower.

After they leave, Val, Doc and Richard find a naked woman in the car's trunk named Sylvia, who was kidnapped and raped by a group of men, and tells them where they are. Val and Doc go inside and subdue the kidnappers. After tying everyone up, Sylvia comes in with a baseball bat for her revenge.

Back at the car, Doc and Val find that Richard has died of cardiac arrest. They break the news to Nina, who helps the two bury her father at the cemetery next to his wife Julie. Doc and Val return to the diner, where the young waitress is revealed to be Doc's granddaughter Alex. Doc makes a phone call to Claphands, who had ordered him to kill Val. Although Doc begs him to show Val mercy, Claphands reveals that he knows about Alex, and threatens to hurt her unless Doc completes the job.

Doc writes a letter to Alex, puts his apartment keys inside the envelope, and pins it to the wall of the diner. Walking down the street at sunrise, Val spots a church and goes inside to give a priest his confession. Afterward, they break into a tailor shop, where they try on suits. The two thugs who approached them the previous night at the club and are working for Claphands interrupt them, pestering Doc to kill Val. Doc and Val shoot and wound them both. They both put on new suits and prepare to face the reality of the situation.

Alex enters Doc's apartment and looks around. Doc calls her from a payphone and tells her that the sunrise paintings were inspired by her, and has her retrieve a shoebox full of cash that he saved for her future. He tells her that he loves her, but that she might not see him for a while. Doc and Val walk down the street; Doc cannot bring himself to kill Val, so they decide to kill Claphands. They open fire on his men and his warehouse; the villains return fire.

== Cast ==
- Al Pacino as Val
- Christopher Walken as "Doc"
- Alan Arkin as Richard Hirsch
- Julianna Margulies as Nina Hirsch
- Mark Margolis as "Claphands"
- Lucy Punch as Wendy
- Addison Timlin as Alex
- Vanessa Ferlito as Sylvia
- Katheryn Winnick as Oxana
- Bill Burr as Larry

== Release ==
The film premiered at the Chicago International Film Festival on October 12, 2012, and was shown at the Mill Valley Film Festival.

=== Home media ===
The film was released in the United States by Lionsgate Home Entertainment on DVD and Blu-ray on May 21, 2013.

== Reception ==
On review aggregator Rotten Tomatoes, 37% of 104 critics gave the film a positive review, with an average rating of 5.1/10. The website's critics consensus reads: "Stand Up Guys largely wastes its talented cast in a resolutely mediocre comedy hampered by messy direction and a perfunctory script." Metacritic, which uses a weighted average, assigned the film a score of 41 out of 100, based on 32 critics, indicating "mixed or average" reviews.

Slant Magazine gave the film two-and-a-half stars out of four:

Watching Christopher Walken, Al Pacino, and Alan Arkin sitting in a diner, talking about the old days, produces a certain kind of frisson, a comforting familiarity that springs from their collective decades of on-screen myth-making. Conversely, though, there's a profound sense of despair that stems from seeing the man who played Michael Corleone lying on a hospital bed with a pup-tent erection, leering at his doctor in a scene that feels ripped from a sub-Apatow VOD knockoff. Your mileage with Stand Up Guys will depend on how much despair you're willing to endure in order to get to the worthwhile stuff—scenes in which the rookie filmmakers get out of the way and let the veteran actors play off of each other.

Owen Gleiberman gave the film a grade of B− (on a scale of A+ to F), and concluded:

Directing his first dramatic feature, Fisher Stevens does his best to give these gravel-voiced legends room to strut their stuff. But that's the problem: The movie is too much of a wide-eyed, ramshackle homage to '70s-acting-class indulgence. It needed much more shape and snap. Still, when Alan Arkin joins the party as a dying colleague, his antics—at least once he gets behind the wheel of a stolen car—give the film a fuel injection. Stand Up Guys reminds you that these three are still way too good to collapse into shticky self-parody, even when they're in a movie that's practically begging them to.

Roger Ebert of the Chicago Sun-Times enjoyed the film, giving it three-and-a-half stars out of four, saying, "Apart from any objective ranking of the actors, Walken is a spice in any screenplay, and in 'Stand Up Guys,' there's room for at least as much spice as goulash. Director Fisher Stevens begins with a permissive screenplay by Noah Haidle that exists in no particular city, for no particular reason other than to give the actors the pleasure of riffing through more or less standard set-pieces."

Mick LaSalle of the San Francisco Chronicle gave the film one of its most glowing reviews, saying that it contains the "best performance[s] in years" by both Pacino and Walken; as LaSalle puts it, the film is "difficult to talk about. Say it's a movie about old gangsters, and you immediately imagine the other person thinking, 'It's sentimental.' Mention a scene in which the old gangsters show up at a brothel, and a whole other set of cliches come to mind. But Stand Up Guys is different. It introduces standard movie tropes only to subvert them and broaden them and bring out their truth."

At the 70th Golden Globe Awards, the film was nominated for a Best Original Song for "Not Running Anymore" by Jon Bon Jovi.
