= Almost Christmas =

Almost Christmas may refer to:

- Almost Christmas (film), a 2016 American film
- Almost Christmas, a working title for the 2013 American film All Is Bright
