= Amy Landecker =

American actress (born 1969)

- Landecker in 2026
- Born: Amy Lauren Landecker; September 30, 1969 (age 57); Chicago, Illinois, U.S.
- Education: University of Wisconsin-Madison
- Occupation: Actress
- Years active: 1998–present
- Spouses: Jackson Lynch (div. 2011); Bradley Whitford (m. 2019)
- Children: 1
- Parent: John Records Landecker (father)
- Relatives: Joseph N. Welch (maternal great-grandfather)

Amy Lauren Landecker (born September 30, 1969) is an American actress. She is known for her role as Sarah Pfefferman on the Amazon comedy-drama series Transparent (2014–2019), as well as her supporting roles in the films Dan in Real Life (2007), A Serious Man (2009), All Is Bright (2013), Project Almanac (2015), and Beatriz at Dinner (2017), and the TV series Your Honor (2020–2023) and Trollhunters: Tales of Arcadia (2016-2018)

== Early life ==
Landecker was born September 30, 1969, in Chicago, Illinois. She is the daughter of John Records Landecker, a Chicago radio personality. One of her maternal great-grandfathers was lawyer Joseph N. Welch. She attended the University of Wisconsin-Madison, studying theater. Her paternal grandfather was a German Jewish refugee.

== Career ==
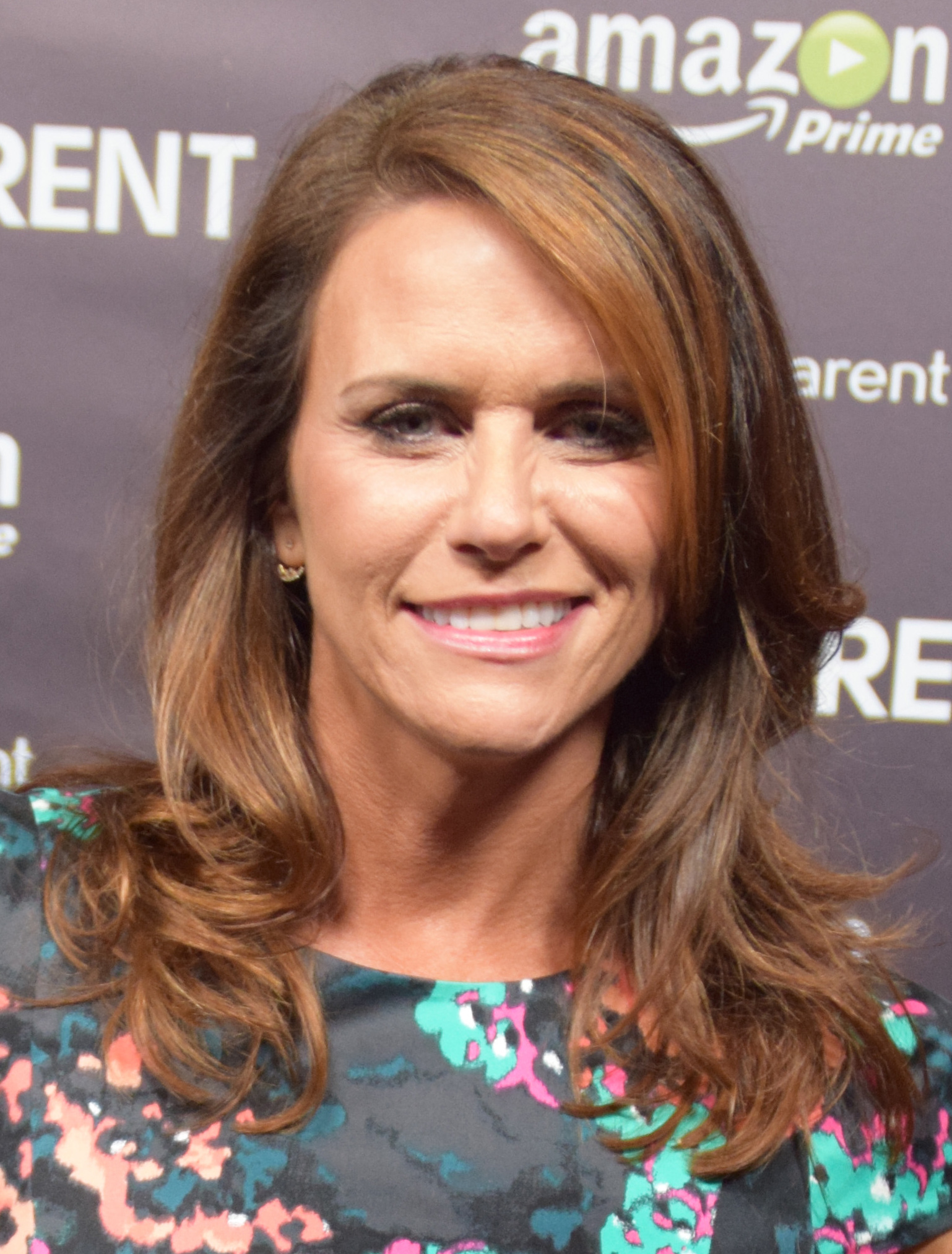
Landecker in 2015

Landecker earned her Screen Actors Guild card doing a voiceover for a Tampax commercial. In the commercial, Landecker echoes the voice of the on-camera actress, saying only the word "ballet", but made $10,000 in residuals from the commercial. Landecker recalls, "I never saw money like that in my life, and it didn't even matter what I looked like! I was hooked on [voiceover] from then on!"

Early in her career, Landecker primarily focused on stage work, including but not limited to Rajiv Joseph's All This Intimacy in 2006, and did not move to Los Angeles until she was 38. Since then, she has appeared in numerous films and television shows, including a supporting role as Mrs. Samsky in the Academy Award for Best Picture-nominated film A Serious Man, directed by the Coen brothers. That performance received praise from many film critics, including Roger Ebert, who wrote, "Amy Landecker, too, is perfect as Mrs. Samsky. She makes the character sexy in a strictly logical sense, but any prudent man would know on first sight to stay clear".

In 2011, Landecker was a regular cast member of The Paul Reiser Show on NBC, playing Paul Reiser's wife, Claire. On television, she has guest starred on Law & Order: Special Victims Unit, Law & Order: Criminal Intent, NCIS, Curb Your Enthusiasm (where her character meets and starts to date Larry David), Revenge, and many more series. She has also appeared in a number of Off-Broadway theatrical productions, including Bug. In 2013, Landecker co-starred in the films All Is Bright, Clear History, and Enough Said. In 2014, she was cast alongside Jeffrey Tambor and Judith Light in the Amazon Studios comedy-drama series, Transparent. She co-starred in the Michael Bay-produced time travel thriller Project Almanac, which was released in January 2015.

== Personal life ==
Landecker divorced Jackson Lynch, with whom she has a daughter, in 2011. She began dating actor Bradley Whitford, whom she met on the set of Transparent, in 2015. They announced their engagement in March 2018 and married on July 17, 2019.

== Filmography ==
=== Film ===
Year	Film	Role	Notes
1998	Temporary Girl	Sondra Hardwood	
1999	Turks	Woman on Train	
1999	Light It Up	Reporter	
2007	Dan in Real Life	Cindy Lamson	
2009	A Serious Man	Mrs. Samsky	
2013	All Is Bright	Therese	
2013	Enough Said	Debbie	
2013	What Should We Watch?	Irene	Short film
2015	Project Almanac	Kathy	
2015	Upended	Cate	Short film
2015	Babysitter	Janine	
2015	The Meddler	Diane	
2016	Dreamland	Olivia	
2016	Upended	Cate	Short film
2017	Beatriz at Dinner	Jeana	
2017	The Hunter's Prayer	Banks	
2018	A Kid Like Jake	Sandra	
2019	Snatchers	Cheryl	
2019	3 Days with Dad	Velma	
2019	Bombshell	Dianne Brandi	
2020	Shithouse	Mrs. Malmquist	
2020	Project Power	Gardner	
2021	Batman: The Long Halloween, Part One	Barbara Gordon	Voice; direct-to-video
2021	Trollhunters: Rise of the Titans	Barbara Lake	Voice
2021	Batman: The Long Halloween, Part Two	Barbara Gordon, Carla Viti	Voice; direct-to-video
2022	Three Months	Edith	
2022	I Love My Dad	Diane	
2023	Missing	Heather	
2024	Shell	Detective Flores	
2025	For Worse	Lauren	Also director and writer
2026	Misty Green	Celine	

=== Television ===
Year	Title	Role	Notes
1999–2000	Early Edition	Susan Schwartz	2 episodes
2003	Law & Order: Special Victims Unit	Stephanie Grayson	Episode: "Rotten"
2005	Law & Order: Special Victims Unit	Jamie Callahan	Episode: "Goliath"
2006	Conviction	Donna Thatcher	Episode: "True Love"
2008	Law & Order	Attorney Parrish	Episode: "Misbegotten"
2008	Mad Men	Petra Colson	Episode: "A Night to Remember"
2010	Law & Order: Criminal Intent	Agent Stahl	2 episodes
2010–2014	Louie	Sandra/Louie's Mother	4 episodes
2011	NCIS	Dr. Ellen Gracey	Episode: "Out of the Frying Pan"
2011	The Paul Reiser Show	Claire	Series regular, 7 episodes
2011	House	Darrien	Episode: "After Hours"
2011	The Protector	Arlene Duncan	Episode: "Spoon"
2011	Happily Divorced	Audrey	Episode: "Someone Wants Me"
2011	Curb Your Enthusiasm	Jane Cohen	Episode: "The Bi-Sexual"
2011	Prime Suspect	Alice Paget	Episode: "The Great Wall of Silence"
2011–2014	Revenge	Dr. Michelle Banks	3 episodes
2012	House of Lies	Janelle Winter	Episode: "Microphallus"
2012	Private Practice	Melissa	Episode: "Too Much"
2012	Retired at 35	Kat	Episode: "The Proposal"
2013	Vegas	Karen Schultz	Episode: "From This Day Forward"
2013	Clear History	Nathan's Wife	Television film
2014–2019	Transparent	Sarah Pfefferman	Series regular; 38 episodes Nominated—Screen Actors Guild Award for Outstanding Performance by an Ensemble in a Comedy Series (2015); Nominated—Gold Derby Award for Best Comedy Supporting Actress (2016)
2015	Married	Harper's Mom	Episode: "Koreatown"
2016	People of Earth	Debbie Schultz	Episode: "Acceptance"
2016–2018	Trollhunters: Tales of Arcadia	Barbara Lake (voice)	37 episodes
2017	Room 104	Joan Teakins	Episode: "Phoenix"
2018	Grey's Anatomy	Morgan	Episode: "(Don’t Fear) the Reaper"
2018	Alone Together	Camille	Episode: "Dinner Party"
2018	LA to Vegas	Patricia	3 episodes
2019	Sneaky Pete	Lorraine Sheffield	Recurring, 5 episodes
2019	The Twilight Zone	Anne Storck	Episode: "The Blue Scorpion"
2019–2022	The Handmaid's Tale	Mrs. MacKenzie	3 episodes
2019	She-Ra and the Princesses of Power	Octavia (voice)	Episode: "Boys' Night Out"
2020	Kipo and the Age of Wonderbeasts	Dr. Emilia (voice)	17 episodes
2020	Little Birds	Vanessa Savage	3 episodes
2020–2023	Your Honor	Nancy Costello	Recurring role (season 1 & 2)
2021	Q-Force	(voice)	Episode: "Backache Mountain"
2021	The Premise	Trish	Episode: "Moment of Silence"
2021–2023	The Croods: Family Tree	Ugga Crood (voice)	49 episodes
2022	Minx	Bridget Westbury	3 episodes
2022	Chivalry	Mia	2 episodes
2022	We Baby Bears	Gail (voice)	Episode: "Tooth Fairy Tech"
2022	Gaslit	Lurleen Landry	Episode: "Tuffy"
2022	Ramy	Kendra	Episode: "American Life Coach"
2024	In the Know	Various voices	4 episodes
2025	Law & Order: Special Victims Unit	Katharine Vernon	Episode: "First Light"
2025	Number 1 Happy Family USA	Donna (voice)	Episode: "Egypt Is On the Phone!"
2026	The Testaments	Tabitha MacKenzie	Episode: "Perfect Teeth"
