= Walk of Shame (film) =

2014 film by Steven Brill

- Theatrical release poster
- Directed by: Steven Brill
- Written by: Steven Brill
- Produced by: Sidney Kimmel; Tom Rosenberg; Gary Lucchesi
- Starring: Elizabeth Banks; James Marsden; Gillian Jacobs; Sarah Wright Olsen
- Cinematography: Jonathan Brown
- Edited by: Patrick J. Don Vito
- Music by: John Debney
- Production companies: Sidney Kimmel Entertainment; Lakeshore Entertainment
- Distributed by: Focus World
- Release date: May 2, 2014
- Running time: 95 minutes
- Country: United States
- Language: English
- Budget: $15 million
- Box office: $8.1 million

Walk of Shame is a 2014 American comedy film written and directed by Steven Brill. It stars Elizabeth Banks as a news reporter who finds a way to get in to the studio in time after her car is towed away. James Marsden, Gillian Jacobs, and Sarah Wright Olsen also stars. The film was released in select theaters and through video on demand in the United States on May 2, 2014, by Focus World.

Walk of Shame garnered negative reviews from critics who commended Banks' performance but criticized Brill's filmmaking for creating an unspectacular comedic romp filled with broad caricatures and misogynistic views on women. The film grossed $8.1 million worldwide against a production budget of $15 million.

== Plot ==
Meghan Miles, a newscaster for local Los Angeles TV affiliate KZLA6, is rejected for an anchor position with a network news program in favor of news reporter Wendy Chang. Having made prior plans with her friends Rose and Denise to go to a club, Meghan ends up highly intoxicated and is invited to join a group of men in a booth. When one of them invites her to leave with him, she instead leaves on her own, only to become trapped on a fire escape. Rescued by Gordon, a part-time bartender at the club and a romantic fiction writer, Meghan goes home with him, awakening later in bed with him wearing only her undergarments.

Meghan slips out of his apartment and watches her car being towed away with her purse inside. Looking for a way home, she startles a sleeping taxi driver who mistakes her request to take her to the impound lot as directions to Tattoo, a strip club. Having no money, the driver demands a lap dance as payment and Meghan runs off. She ends up at The Point where Officers Dave and Walter interpret her flagging down cars for help as solicitation, and issue her a warning.

Meghan continues on, encountering a crack dealer named Scrilla, who she chases back to his crack house when police officers ambush them on the street corner. At the crack house, she meets Scrilla's friends Hulk and Pookie. When a rival gang attacks the crack house, Pookie escorts Meghan out through a drain pipe and they make a run for it. Before parting ways, Pookie gives her $10 worth of crack that she can hopefully sell or trade for the cash she needs to get home.

After attempting to peddle the crack to a rival dealer, Meghan escapes on a city bus and manages to travel several blocks without paying the fare before the bus driver sprays mace in Meghan's eyes and ejects her from the bus.

After flushing her eyes out from a spigot, she steals a boy's bicycle from the public library and heads towards the freeway until Officers Dave and Walter, along with the bike owner, track her down. She eludes the police and, stealing a pair of sneakers, sprints to Interstate 10, where she crosses just as the traffic returns after an interruption from road construction.

Making it to the impound lot, she is denied by the clerk. Sneaking into the gate behind a tow truck, she gets into her car only to find that her purse has been stolen. Distraught, she steals her own vehicle, but fails to make it out of the lot before the clerk deliberately activates the spike strips to blow out all four of her tires, and the gate shuts, wedging her vehicle.

Gordon, Rose and Denise arrive in time, giving her a ride back to the station. However, the "Carpocalypse", previously reported on by Meghan for causing massive traffic congestion on Los Angeles freeways, stops their journey short. Meghan calls KZLA's traffic reporter who arrives in his helicopter to pick her up and deliver her to the station.

She arrives in time to go on air, only to discover she is reporting on her own escapades from the night before. Deciding to set the record straight, she clarifies on all of the misunderstandings and stands up for her actions. The network executives appreciated what they saw and pitch a reality show to her which she holds out on and departs with Gordon.

== Cast ==
- Elizabeth Banks as Meghan Miles
- James Marsden as Gordon
- Gillian Jacobs as Rose, Meghan's best friend
- Sarah Wright as Denise, Meghan's best friend
- Ethan Suplee as Officer Dave
- Bill Burr as Officer Walter
- Oliver Hudson as Kyle, Meghan's former boyfriend
- Eric Etebari as Denise's bad date guy
- Willie Garson as Dan Karlin
- Larry Gilliard, Jr. as Scrilla, a dealer who helps Meghan
- Alphonso McAuley as Pookie, a dealer who helps Meghan
- Da'Vone McDonald as Hulk, a dealer who helps Meghan
- Kevin Nealon as Chopper Steve
- Brandon Scott as Josh, the KZLA6 newscaster
- Vic Chao as Shift Captain
- P. J. Byrne as Moshe
- Ken Davitian as cab driver
- Tig Notaro as impound woman
- Niecy Nash as bus driver
- Bryan Callen as enemy dealer
- Gillian Vigman as Blooper Woman #1

== Reception ==
=== Box office ===
In the United States, Walk of Shame grossed $38,000 from 51 theatres in its opening weekend, averaging $780 per theater. The film earned $59,209 in the United States and $8 million in other territories for a worldwide total of $8.1 million.

=== Critical response ===
Walk of Shame received negative reviews from critics. On Rotten Tomatoes, the film holds a 15% approval rating based on 26 reviews, with an average score of 3.9/10. The site's critical consensus reads: "Incoherent, unfunny, and borderline misogynistic, Walk of Shame lives up to its title for filmgoers entering and leaving the theater". On Metacritic, the film holds a score of 25 out of 100, based on 13 critics, indicating "generally unfavorable reviews".

Despite finding the supporting cast "one-dimensional and uninteresting" and segments of the Los Angeles adventure "clunky and awkward", Paste contributor Chris Morgan praised Banks' comedic skills for keeping her character's journey interesting, concluding that, "It may be the second best "woman takes wild, wacky trip across Los Angeles" comedy to come out in the last decade, but it is still a pretty good, pretty funny movie." Alonso Duralde from TheWrap gave credit to Banks for going through all kinds of "physical comedy and humiliation" in her role but found criticism in the "frequently forced and overly frenetic" delivery of the film's humor and mishandled topic of society's treatment of women. Entertainment Weekly writer Joe McGovern gave the film a "D" grade, feeling embarrassed for Banks being in a gutless plot that doesn't push for either gallows humor or wacky comedy, calling it "a lumpy and laughless farce".

Elizabeth Weitzman of the New York Daily News commended Banks' performance for trying to make the movie watchable but criticized Brill's "lazy filmmaking" for crafting a banal setting filled with sexist views on women and broad stereotypes. Robert Abele, writing for the Los Angeles Times, found the film's L.A. escapades to be a "one-note slog" with "racial stereotypes" and "perfunctorily assembled" conflicts that Banks goes through while attempting to craft a worthwhile performance, calling it "an unintended nightmare scenario for women in Hollywood, and the persistent humiliation required just to get noticed."
