= The Book of Henry =

2017 film by Colin Trevorrow

- Theatrical release poster
- Directed by: Colin Trevorrow
- Written by: Gregg Hurwitz
- Produced by: Sidney Kimmel; Carla Hacken; Jenette Kahn; Adam Richman
- Starring: Naomi Watts; Jaeden Lieberher; Jacob Tremblay; Sarah Silverman; Lee Pace; Maddie Ziegler; Tonya Pinkins; Dean Norris
- Cinematography: John Schwartzman
- Edited by: Kevin Stitt
- Music by: Michael Giacchino
- Production companies: Sidney Kimmel Entertainment; Double Nickel Entertainment
- Distributed by: Focus Features
- Release dates: June 14, 2017 (LAFF); June 16, 2017 (United States)
- Running time: 105 minutes
- Country: United States
- Language: English
- Budget: $10 million
- Box office: $4.6 million

The Book of Henry is a 2017 American drama thriller film directed by Colin Trevorrow and written by Gregg Hurwitz. The film stars Naomi Watts, Jaeden Martell (then known as Jaeden Lieberher), Jacob Tremblay, Sarah Silverman, Lee Pace, Maddie Ziegler, and Dean Norris. The story concerns a plan hatched by a young genius, dying of cancer, to save the girl next door from abuse.

The film premiered at the Los Angeles Film Festival on June 14, 2017, and was released in theaters by Focus Features on June 16, 2017. It grossed $4.6 million worldwide against a budget of $10 million, and received generally unfavorable reviews from critics, who cited the screenplay's jarring plot twists, inconsistent tonal shifts and Trevorrow's unfocused direction, though some praised the performances and the film's ambition.

== Plot ==
In a small suburban town in the Hudson Valley, 11-year-old genius Henry Carpenter and his younger brother Peter are being raised by their single mother Susan, a waitress who is working on writing children's books. Henry has used his intellect to invest successfully in the stock market, building up a very substantial nest egg for his family. He also protects Peter from a school bully and builds Rube Goldberg machines in their treehouse. Henry and Susan are both fond of their next-door neighbor, Henry's classmate Christina Sickleman, who has recently become glum.

Henry believes that he sees Christina being abused by her stepfather Glenn, the local police commissioner. He reports the abuse to social services and the school principal, Janice Wilder, but Glenn has connections throughout the local government, and Wilder is reluctant to challenge the commissioner without "conclusive evidence". Henry is unable to get the authorities to launch a serious investigation that would protect Christina. Henry tells his mother that when someone is in trouble, those who can help must take action. He develops a detailed plan to rescue Christina that he details in a notebook. After a violent seizure, he is taken to the hospital, where he is diagnosed with a brain tumor and undergoes surgery. Anticipating his death, he tells Peter to give Susan the notebook. Days later, Henry dies.

Susan is distraught at Henry's death and has difficulty functioning, but when Peter gives her the notebook, she focuses on Henry's plan. She tries unsuccessfully to interest a nearby social-services agency in opening an investigation. One night, from the boys' bedroom window, she sees Glenn in Christina's room and decides to carry out the plan. The notebook and an accompanying cassette tape describe Henry's step-by-step plan to kill Glenn with a sniper rifle while covering Susan's tracks so that tracing the murder back to her will be impossible. Her alibi is to be provided by executing the murder while Christina and Peter are performing at the school talent show.

Susan slips away from the show, putting the plan into motion. As she is about to pull the trigger, she realizes that Henry's plan, though ingenious, is the construct of a child, and she must act as an adult. She immediately confronts Glenn and tells him that she will expose him for what he has done to Christina. He replies that everyone will believe him, not her, and tells her that he is going to call his police chief to come arrest her. At the same time, affected by Christina's dance performance at the talent show, Principal Wilder decides to follow through on the abuse accusation and contacts the authorities. Glenn returns home, calls his relative at Social Services, and learns that an investigation is being opened into his abuse of Christina. As the police arrive at his house, Glenn kills himself. Susan legally adopts Christina as her daughter. She also finishes writing one of her children's books, as Henry had urged her to do.

== Cast ==
- Naomi Watts as Susan Carpenter, the mother of Henry and Peter
- Jaeden Martell as Henry Carpenter, the title character and Susan's older son
- Jacob Tremblay as Peter Carpenter, Henry's brother and Susan's younger son
- Sarah Silverman as Sheila, a waitress and Susan's best friend
- Dean Norris as Glenn Sickleman, the police commissioner and Christina's abusive stepfather
- Lee Pace as David Daniels, a neurosurgeon who operates on Henry
- Maddie Ziegler as Christina Sickleman, Glenn's stepdaughter
- Tonya Pinkins as Janice Wilder, the school principal
- Bobby Moynihan as John, Susan's and Sheila's boss at the diner
- Geraldine Hughes as Mrs. Evans, Henry's and Christina's teacher
- Jackson Nicoll as Morris, a boy who bullies Peter

== Production ==
Hurwitz wrote the first draft of the screenplay by 1998. The film was eventually optioned by Jenette Kahn, and Sidney Kimmel Entertainment joined as a producer. An executive at Kimmel Entertainment thought that Colin Trevorrow would be right to direct The Book of Henry. Trevorrow and Hurwitz found each other to be congenial, but then Trevorrow was hired to direct Jurassic World. Another director was considered. By early 2015, after Trevorrow finished Jurassic World, he returned to The Book of Henry. Kimmel Entertainment and Double Nickel Entertainment financed and co-produced the film; producers are Sidney Kimmel, Kahn and Adam Richman. Focus Features obtained worldwide distribution rights.

Principal photography on the film began in September 2015 in and around New York City, and concluded in November.

=== Music ===
The music was composed by Michael Giacchino. Stevie Nicks sang a new song in the film.

== Release ==
The Book of Henry was scheduled to be released on September 16, 2016, but Focus rescheduled the film's release to June 16, 2017, concluding that during the summer, the film release schedule would offer fewer adult-oriented films that might compete against The Book of Henry for older viewers. The film premiered at the Los Angeles Film Festival on June 14, 2017. In its opening weekend, the film grossed $1.4 million from 579 theaters (an average of $2,460 per theater), finishing 13th at the box office, making it "by far the biggest start among the new Specialties" opening that weekend. The film was, however, not a financial success.

The film was featured at the July 2017 Ischia Global Film & Music Festival, where Trevorrow was honored with the Breakout Director award for the film.

== Critical response ==
On Rotten Tomatoes, the film has an approval rating of 21% based on 146 reviews, with an average rating of 4.10/10. The site's critical consensus reads, "The Book of Henry deserves a few points for ambition, but its tonal juggling act – and a deeply maudlin twist – may leave viewers gaping in disbelief rather than choking back tears." On Metacritic the film has a weighted average score of 31 out of 100, based on 31 critics, indicating "generally unfavorable reviews". PostTrak reported audiences gave the film an 86% overall positive score and a 65% "definite recommend".

Owen Gleiberman of Variety wrote: "There's the kind of bad movie that just sits there, unfolding with grimly predictable monotony. Then there's the kind where the badness expands and metastasizes, taking on a jaw-dropping life of its own, pushing through to ever-higher levels of garishness. The Book of Henry ... is of the latter, you've-got-to-see-it-to-disbelieve-it variety." The Guardian's Peter Bradshaw, in a critical review, said that, "in its pure misjudged ickiness, bad-acting ropiness, and its quirksy, smirksy passive-aggressive tweeness, this insidiously terrible film could hardly get any more skin-crawling." Writing for Vulture, Emily Yoshida opined, "It does not suffice to call The Book of Henry bad; it's nonfunctional, so poorly conceived from the ground up as to slip out of the grasp of the usual standards one applies to narrative film. It might be admirable if it wasn't such torture to watch."

Ignatiy Vishnevetsky of The A.V. Club wrote: "Director Colin Trevorrow ... lacks any of the eccentricities that might make this quirky and contrived material work, even at face value," though he added, "its above-average performances and insistence on following through on an off-beat premise give it a hint of battiness." Writing for Rolling Stone, Peter Travers gave it 1.5 stars out of 4, saying: "The Book of Henry starts well, begins flirting with absurdity in the middle – and ends in crashing disaster. But the feeling persists that director Colin Treverrow believes every word in the shambles of a 20-year-old screenplay by crime novelist Gregg Hurwitz." Stephen Schaefer of the Boston Herald was one of the minority of critics who praised the film as "endearing" and "smart".
