= Greta (2018 film) =

2018 film by Neil Jordan

- Theatrical release poster
- Directed by: Neil Jordan
- Screenplay by: Ray Wright; Neil Jordan
- Story by: Ray Wright
- Produced by: Sidney Kimmel; John Penotti; James Flynn; Lawrence Bender; Karen Richards
- Starring: Isabelle Huppert; Chloë Grace Moretz; Maika Monroe; Colm Feore; Stephen Rea
- Cinematography: Seamus McGarvey
- Edited by: Nick Emerson
- Music by: Javier Navarrete
- Production companies: Sidney Kimmel Entertainment; Showbox; Starlight Culture Entertainment Group; Screen Ireland; Lawrence Bender Productions; Metropolitan Films; Little Wave Productions
- Distributed by: Focus Features (United States); Universal Pictures (Ireland)
- Release dates: 6 September 2018 (TIFF); 1 March 2019 (United States); 19 April 2019 (Ireland)
- Running time: 98 minutes
- Countries: United States; Ireland
- Language: English
- Box office: $19 million

Greta is a 2018 psychological thriller film directed by Neil Jordan and written by Ray Wright and Jordan. The film is an international co-production between the United States and Ireland. The film stars Isabelle Huppert, Chloë Grace Moretz, Maika Monroe, Colm Feore and Stephen Rea, and follows a young woman as she befriends a lonely widow who becomes disturbingly obsessed with her.

Greta held its world premiere at the Toronto International Film Festival on 6 September 2018. It was theatrically released on 1 March 2019 in the United States, by Focus Features. The film grossed $19 million worldwide and received mixed reviews from critics.

== Plot ==
Frances McCullen, a young waitress living in New York City, finds a handbag on a subway train; the ID inside the bag reveals the owner to be a Greta Hideg. Frances visits Greta the next day to return the bag, and Greta invites her in for coffee. Greta tells Frances she is a widow from France, and her daughter Nicola is still there, studying in Paris. Frances and Greta become friends.

One night while having dinner at Greta's, Frances finds a closet full of handbags identical to the one she found on the train. Attached to the bags are names and phone numbers, including Frances' own. Disturbed by the discovery, Frances cuts ties with Greta, who then begins to stalk Frances, seeing herself as a replacement for Frances' late mother. After Greta turns up at Frances' work, Frances contacts the police and pursues a protection order, but is told the process will take months.

Frances meets a former lover of Nicola's, and discovers that Greta is Hungarian and not French, and that her sadistic behavior led to her daughter's suicide four years ago. Meanwhile, Greta has also taken up stalking Frances' best friend and roommate, Erica. Greta shows up at the restaurant to cause a scene, insisting Frances' mother had to die for them to meet. Greta suffers a nervous breakdown and is hospitalised.

Erica suggests Frances lie to Greta about leaving town to spend time with her father, and instead secretly hide in their apartment for a while. The following morning, Frances is drugged and kidnapped by Greta. After locking Frances in a wooden chest in a secret room at her house, Greta uses Frances' cell phone to separately text her father, Chris, and Erica, telling each that Frances is with the other. When Frances is released from the chest, she finds clothing and IDs of other young women Greta had previously kidnapped, implying that she has killed all of them. Greta also kills the dog Frances had helped her to adopt.

Erica and Chris eventually get together and realize that Frances is not with either of them. Greta forces Frances to learn Hungarian and to play the piano, trying to make her her new "daughter". While Greta is distracted during a cooking lesson, Frances severs Greta's little finger and then knocks her unconscious. Frances tries to escape, but finds all the doors and windows sealed off. Running into the basement to search for an exit, she finds one of Greta's previous victims under a plastic sheet. Greta sneaks up behind Frances and suffocates her until she passes out.

Chris hires a private investigator, Cody, to investigate Greta. Cody learns she was dismissed from her work as a nurse for misusing anaesthetics. When he meets with Greta in her home, Frances, gagged and bound, attempts to get his attention by shaking the bed; Greta blocks out the noise with music. Cody begins to realize there's a secret room nearby, but his discovery is cut short when Greta plunges a syringe into his neck, then shoots him with his own gun.

An indeterminate amount of time passes, and Greta leaves another handbag on the subway. A young woman arrives to return it. Greta invites her in for coffee, but starts to feel faint after finishing her own cup. The young woman suddenly sheds her disguise and reveals herself to be Erica, having drugged Greta's drink. Erica reveals that she's been searching for the handbag on the subway for a long time. Greta passes out and Erica finds Frances. As they try to escape, Greta emerges from the shadows and grabs at Frances before passing out again.

Erica and Frances lock Greta's unconscious body in the toy chest, using an Eiffel Tower trinket as a makeshift latch. After they leave to call the police, the lid of the chest rattles.

== Cast ==
- Isabelle Huppert as Greta Hideg, an obsessive piano teacher and former nurse
- Chloë Grace Moretz as Frances McCullen, a young waitress
- Maika Monroe as Erica Penn, Frances's friend and roommate
- Colm Feore as Chris McCullen, Frances's workaholic father
- Stephen Rea as Brian Cody, a private investigator
- Zawe Ashton as Alexa Hammond, lover of Greta's long-dead daughter, Nicola
- Thaddeus Daniels as Officer Deroy
- Jeff Hiller as Maitre D' Henri
- Parker Sawyers as Park Hill Manager

== Production ==
In May 2017, it was announced that Isabelle Huppert and Chloë Grace Moretz had signed to star in the film, then titled The Widow. In August 2017, Maika Monroe joined the cast. In September 2017, Stephen Rea, Colm Feore, and Zawe Ashton were added as well.

The film was produced by Metropolitan Films in cooperation with Lawrence Bender Films, Little Wave Productions and Sidney Kimmel Entertainment. It also received an €650,000 production grant from the Irish Film Board.

Principal photography took place in and around Dublin, beginning in October 2017. It was also filmed on location in Toronto and New York City.

== Release ==
The film had its world premiere at the Toronto International Film Festival on 6 September 2018. Shortly after, Focus Features beat out studios including Netflix, Lionsgate and Neon to acquire North American, Chinese, Australian and New Zealand distribution rights to the film; the company and its parent Universal Pictures had also purchased UK distribution rights prior. Focus estimated the deal to be around $4 million, though some sources believed the number was as high as $6 million. It was theatrically released on 1 March 2019 in the United States.

== Reception ==
=== Critical response ===
On the review aggregator website Rotten Tomatoes, 61% of 283 critics' reviews are positive, with an average rating of 5.7/10. The website's consensus reads: "A bonkers B movie that's occasionally elevated by its A-list talent, Greta dives headlong into camp and struggles to stay afloat." Metacritic, which uses a weighted average, assigned the film a score of 54 out of 100, based on 42 critics, indicating "mixed or average" reviews. Audiences polled by CinemaScore gave the film an average grade of "C" on an A+ to F scale.

=== Box office ===
In the United States and Canada, Greta was released alongside A Madea Family Funeral, and was projected to gross around $6 million from 2,000 theaters in its opening weekend. It grossed $4.5 million in its opening, finishing eighth, going on to an overall gross of $10.5 million the United States and Canada, and $8.1 million in other territories, for a worldwide total of $18.7 million.
