= Trust the Man =

- Theatrical release poster
- Directed by: Bart Freundlich
- Written by: Bart Freundlich
- Produced by: Sidney Kimmel; Tim Perell
- Starring: David Duchovny; Billy Crudup; Julianne Moore; Maggie Gyllenhaal; Eva Mendes; James LeGros
- Cinematography: Tim Orr
- Edited by: John Gilroy
- Music by: Clint Mansell
- Production company: Sidney Kimmel Entertainment
- Distributed by: Fox Searchlight Pictures (United States, Canada, Mexico, Argentina, Paraguay, Uruguay, Chile, Colombia, France, the Benelux, Switzerland, China, Hong Kong, India, Japan, Korea and Taiwan); Capitol Films (International)
- Release dates: September 12, 2005 (TIFF); August 18, 2006 (United States)
- Running time: 103 minutes
- Country: United States
- Language: English
- Box office: $7.4 million

Trust the Man is a 2005 American romantic comedy-drama film written and directed by Bart Freundlich. The film is set in New York and centers around two couples as they deal with relationship issues such as intimacy and commitment.

== Plot ==
The film centers around four best friends: Married couple Tom and Rebecca and longtime relationship partners Tobey and Elaine. The film follows the two couples as they face trials and temptations in their relationships.

Tom, after feeling a lack of intimacy with his wife, meets a divorced mother at his sons school. Rebecca, a film actress making her stage debut, meets a younger actor named Jasper, who shows infatuation for her. Tobey, who does not show interest in settling down for marriage or kids, runs into an old fling from college named Faith. Elaine, after confronting Tobey about wanting to get married and have a family, meets several suitors throughout the film.

The story follows Tom and Tobey as they attempt to mend their relationships with their partners.

== Cast ==
- David Duchovny as Tom Pollack
- Julianne Moore as Rebecca Pollack
- Billy Crudup as Tobey
- Maggie Gyllenhaal as Elaine
- Eva Mendes as Faith Faison
- Garry Shandling as Dr. Beekman
- Ellen Barkin as Norah
- Dagmara Domińczyk as Pamela
- Justin Bartha as Jasper Bernard
- Sterling K. Brown as Rand
- James LeGros as Dante
- Glenn Fitzgerald as Goren
- David Greenspan as Francis
- Paul Hecht as Amis
- Jim Gaffigan as Gordon
- Jayne Houdyshell as Support Group Leader
- Kate Jennings Grant as Support Group Woman
- Brian Tarantina as Crazy Hair Driver
- Noelle Beck as Flight Attendant
- Bob Balaban as Tobey's Therapist (uncredited)
- John Carroll Lynch as Doctor (deleted scene)

== Release ==
Trust the Man premiered at the 2005 Toronto International Film Festival and was picked up by Fox Searchlight Pictures for distribution in North America, Argentina, Paraguay, Uruguay, Chile, the Benelux, China, Colombia, France, Hong Kong, India, Japan, Mexico, South Korea, Switzerland and Taiwan.

The film opened in the United States on August 18, 2006.

== Reception ==
As of June 2025, Trust the Man holds a 30% approval rating on Rotten Tomatoes, based on 101 reviews with an average rating of 4.7/10. The website's critics consensus reads: "What aspires to be a sophisticated, unconventional romantic comedy turns out to be a contrivance-filled pretender to other, better films of its genre." Another review aggregator, Metacritic, gives the film a 43/100 approval rating based on 30 critics' reviews.

Michael Rechtshaffen of The Hollywood Reporter praised the film, saying "Both geographically and thematically speaking, writer-director Freundlich finds himself on vintage Woody Allen turf here -- as in the "Manhattan"/"Husbands and Wives" Woody Allen -- while still managing to lend the production a unique voice of its own. And Allen would've killed for Freundlich's terrific cast." Liz Beardsworth of Empire gave the film 3 out of 5 stars and wrote "Freundlich’s retread gleans new colour thanks to his sparkling dialogue, the urbane New York setting and great work from his superior cast, all of whom flesh out their roles so that empathy with their respective plights comes easily."

== Accolades ==
Award	Category	Nominee(s)	Result
ALMA Awards	Outstanding Actress - Motion Picture	Eva Mendes	Nominated
