= Death at a Funeral (2007 film) =

- British theatrical release poster
- Directed by: Frank Oz
- Written by: Dean Craig
- Produced by: Sidney Kimmel; Laurence Malkin; Diana Phillips; Share Stallings
- Starring: Ewen Bremner; Peter Dinklage; Matthew Macfadyen; Kris Marshall; Alan Tudyk
- Cinematography: Oliver Curtis
- Edited by: Beverley Mills
- Music by: Murray Gold
- Production companies: Metro-Goldwyn-Mayer; Sidney Kimmel Entertainment; Parabolic Pictures; Stable Way Entertainment; Vip Medienfonds 1 + 2 Target Media
- Distributed by: Verve Pictures (United Kingdom); MGM Distribution Co. (United States); Concorde Filmverleih (Germany)
- Release dates: 17 August 2007 (US); 2 November 2007 (UK)
- Running time: 90 minutes
- Countries: United Kingdom; United States; Germany
- Language: English
- Budget: $9 million
- Box office: $46.8 million

Death at a Funeral is a 2007 British comedy film directed by Frank Oz. This is the original version of Dean Craig’s screenplay, focusing on a family attempting to resolve a variety of problems when they attend the funeral of the patriarch. As of 2026, it remains the most recent feature film directed by Oz.

== Plot ==
Daniel and his wife Jane live in England with his parents, while Daniel's younger brother Robert is a renowned novelist living in New York City. The story begins on the day of their father Edward's funeral. Robert arrives, having flown first class, but declines to help finance the funeral, leaving Daniel to cover all the expenses. As guests begin to arrive, Daniel struggles to complete a eulogy, even though everyone expects Robert will be the one to deliver it.

Daniel's cousin Martha and her fiancé Simon are desperate to make a good impression on Martha's father Victor. Their hopes for doing so are dashed when Martha, hoping to calm Simon's nerves, gives him what she believes is Valium but is actually a hallucinogenic designer drug manufactured by her brother Troy, a pharmacy student.

An American man named Peter introduces himself to Daniel, who is too busy to speak to him and suggests they talk later. The service begins and the hallucinating Simon, certain he sees the coffin moving, tips it over, causing the body to spill out onto the floor. During the ensuing chaos, Simon is told why he is acting as he is, so he panics and locks himself in the bathroom. Martha tries to persuade him to open the door while fending off the unwelcome advances of Justin, with whom she had a past one-night stand that she would like to forget. Simon climbs onto the roof naked and threatens to jump.

While most of the guests are watching Simon on the roof, Peter meets privately with Daniel and Robert and reveals he was their father's lover. Unhappy that he was left nothing in their father's will, Peter shows them compromising photographs, trying to blackmail the family for £15,000. The brothers panic, bind and gag Peter, and give him what they believe is Valium to calm him down. Peter manages to free himself but falls and hits his head on a glass coffee table. Troy and germaphobic family friend Howard believe Peter to be dead. Forced to dispose of the body as quickly and surreptitiously as possible, Daniel and Robert place it in the coffin with their father. Martha manages to talk Simon off the roof by telling him she is pregnant, much to everyone's relief.

Once everyone returns, the service resumes. Daniel's awkward eulogy is interrupted when the still-alive Peter bursts out of the coffin and the photos fall out for everyone, including Daniel and Robert's mother Sandra, to see. Daniel interrupts the ensuing uproar by delivering an impromptu, heartfelt eulogy, declaring that his father may have had secrets, but he was a good man, who loved his family, and that everyone at the funeral could do worse than to follow his example.

In the evening, after all the mourners (including Peter) have gone, Robert compliments Daniel on his speech and tells him that he plans on taking their mother to New York so that Daniel and Jane can finally buy their own flat. Their conversation is interrupted when Jane tells them that Uncle Alfie had a panic attack over seeing what he thought was Peter's dead body, so she gave him some "Valium". As the brothers exchange an alarmed look, the film ends with Uncle Alfie on the roof naked, as Simon had been.

== Cast ==
- Matthew Macfadyen as Daniel
- Rupert Graves as Robert
- Andy Nyman as Howard
- Kris Marshall as Troy
- Peter Dinklage as Peter
- Keeley Hawes as Jane
- Daisy Donovan as Martha
- Alan Tudyk as Simon
- Ewen Bremner as Justin
- Peter Vaughan as Uncle Alfie
- Thomas Wheatley as The Reverend
- Jane Asher as Sandra
- Peter Egan as Victor

== Production ==
The film was shot at Ealing Studios in London. It premiered at the European Film Market in February 2007 and was shown at the US Comedy Arts Festival, the Seattle International Film Festival, the Breckenridge Film Festival, the Maui Film Festival, the Sydney Film Festival, the Provincetown International Film Festival, and the Tremblant Film Festival before going into limited release in the United States on 17 August 2007. It opened throughout Europe, Asia, South America, and Australia before going into theatrical release in the United Kingdom on 2 November 2007.

== Release ==
=== Critical reception ===
On Rotten Tomatoes, the film holds an approval rating of 62% based on 133 reviews, with an average score of 6.00/10. The website's critical consensus reads, "Death at a Funeral is a rousing British farce, with enough slapstick silliness to overcome its faults." On Metacritic, the film has a score of 67 out of 100 based on 30 critics, indicating "generally favorable reviews". Audiences polled by CinemaScore gave the film an average grade of "B+" on an A+ to F scale.

Ruthe Stein of the San Francisco Chronicle said the film is "in the tradition of those classics, in black-and-white and starring Peter Sellers or Alec Guinness, in which disasters keep piling up, each one more drolly funny than the last. That's high praise for Death but no more than it deserves. The humor manages to be simultaneously sophisticated, supremely silly, and very dark...The casting couldn't be better. With no big stars to upset the balance, the actors work together as a true ensemble, the best since Little Miss Sunshine."

Roger Ebert of the Chicago Sun-Times rated it three out of four stars and commented, "The movie is part farce (unplanned entrances and exits), part slapstick (misbehavior of corpses) and part just plain wacky eccentricity. I think the ideal way to see it would be to gather your most dour and disapproving relatives and treat them to a night at the cinema."

Sid Smith of the Chicago Tribune called the film "lethal farce, combining hints of The Lavender Hill Mob, doses of Joe Orton and a smidgen of the Farrelly brothers' scatology in its mix." He added, "The sibling rivalry/resolution meant to give the movie its sweet, heartfelt thread is weak, and there are stretches in which the comedy sags or settles for the predictable. But Death provides an adult tonic in a season typically abandoned to the comic book cocktail. There are worse ways to escape the August heat."

Steve Dollar of the New York Sun said, "The ensemble approach allows for a maximum of comic scenarios to be put into effect, as the film's motor revs into higher and higher gear. Expert pacing and delivery, as well as the abundance of hyper-articulate, over-educated, effervescently British character types, ratchet up the cringe factor accordingly. The film's antic disposition, or rather its disposition toward antics, may strike some as an exercise in overkill, even though, curiously, the film disappointingly resolves all the comic trauma by letting everyone off the hook. Moreover, a lot of the material, especially the closeted gay jokes, seems dated. But for Mr. Oz, finger-snap pacing and an expert cast (surely familiar to any BBC America viewer) bring this Death to giddy life."

Philip French of The Observer said the film, "in which a fine British cast is wasted on feeble material, is directed by Frank Oz in less than wizardly form."

Phelim O'Neill of The Guardian rated it two out of five stars and commented, "Scientists believe that black holes can slow down the progress of time. A similar effect can be felt by viewers of this damp squib of a farce as it grinds on from one lame set-up to the next. This sort of sub-Alan Ayckbourn trawl might work on stage but never on the big screen, where all the deficiencies of the form are thrown into sharp relief. From Oz downwards, the credits are full of familiar names foolishly squandering the goodwill their past works have generated."

=== Box office ===
The film eventually earned $46,600,669, split $8,580,428 in North America and the equivalent of $38,020,241 in other markets. It opened in 260 theatres in the United States on 17 August 2007 and grossed $1,282,973 on its opening weekend, ranking #17 at the box office.

=== Awards ===
Director Frank Oz won the Audience Award at both the US Comedy Arts Festival and the Locarno International Film Festival.

=== Home media ===
The film was released on DVD on 26 February 2008.

== Remakes ==
In 2009, a Hindi remake of the film, entitled Daddy Cool, was released starring Sunil Shetty, Aashish Chaudhary, and Rajpal Yadav.

In 2010, Chris Rock, Tracy Morgan, and Martin Lawrence starred in a remake of the same name, directed by Neil LaBute. Peter Dinklage returned to play the role of Peter, although the character was renamed Frank. The film was released on 16 April 2010 to mixed reviews.

Also in 2010, a Kannada remake of the film, entitled Rangappa Hogbitna, was released starring Ramesh Aravind, Sanjjanaa Galrani, Sihi Kahi Chandru and Sathish Ninasam.

In 2025, a Spanish-Mexican remake entitled Un funeral de locos directed by Manuel Gómez Pereira was released.

In 2026, Italian filmmaker Massimiliano Bruno remade it again as Un tranquillo funerale di famiglia.
