= Sleeping with Other People =

2015 film by Leslye Headland

- Theatrical release poster
- Directed by: Leslye Headland
- Written by: Leslye Headland
- Produced by: Jessica Elbaum; Will Ferrell; Sidney Kimmel; Adam McKay
- Starring: Jason Sudeikis; Alison Brie; Adam Scott; Jason Mantzoukas; Natasha Lyonne; Adam Brody; Amanda Peet
- Cinematography: Ben Kutchins
- Edited by: Paul Frank
- Music by: Andrew Feltenstein; John Nau
- Production companies: Gloria Sanchez Productions; Sidney Kimmel Entertainment
- Distributed by: IFC Films
- Release dates: January 24, 2015 (Sundance); September 11, 2015 (United States)
- Running time: 101 minutes
- Country: United States
- Budget: ~$3 million
- Box office: $3.2 million

Sleeping with Other People is a 2015 American romantic comedy film written and directed by Leslye Headland. The film stars Jason Sudeikis, Alison Brie, Natasha Lyonne, Amanda Peet, and Adam Scott. Premiering at the Sundance Film Festival on January 24, 2015, the film was released theatrically on September 11, 2015, by IFC Films. Sleeping with Other People received generally positive reviews from critics.

== Plot ==
In 2002, Lainey causes a scene in a dorm at Columbia University. Taking pity on her as she is about to be kicked out by security, Jake claims her as his guest. He learns Lainey was there to lose her virginity to her teaching assistant Matthew, who Jake thinks is the most boring guy in the world. Lainey eventually realizes Jake is also a virgin, so they lose their virginity to each other.

Years later, Lainey breaks up with her long-term boyfriend Sam after telling him she has been cheating on him with Matthew. On the advice of her therapist she attends a sex addicts meeting where she runs into Jake, who is there because of his inability to commit. Lainey schedules an appointment with Matthew to end their affair; he agrees and tells her that he is engaged, but they end up having sex.

On the advice of a friend Lainey contacts Jake, and they go on one date where they confess their sexual problems to one another. At the end of the date Jake confesses that he wants to sleep with her. Lainey insists that they should just be friends and he agrees with the safe word "mousetrap" to be used to deflate sexual tension between them.

They hang out more and eventually become best friends, confiding in each other about their dating lives as they try to move past their commitment issues. Strangers mistake them for a couple and their friends begin to think they are in a relationship as well. Jake learns that Lainey is going to re-enroll in medical school and possibly move to Michigan. He brings her to the birthday party of his friend's child, where she meets Chris and begins seeing him to Jake's chagrin. Deciding to move on, he asks his boss Paula on a date.

A date with Chris leads Lainey to run into Matthew and his now-pregnant wife. At the same time, Jake has sex with Paula and calls her Lainey. After their nights out, Jake and Lainey spend the night together where they realize that they are in love with each other. They do nothing about it, afraid to mess up their relationship.

Lainey moves to Michigan and Jake devotes himself to Paula. Two months after Lainey has left, during brunch with Paula, Jake sees Matthew and punches him in the face in front of his wife. Paula breaks up with Jake after he refers to Lainey as "my girl" and he is arrested. He calls Lainey from the police station and confesses he is still in love with her, and wants to pursue a relationship even if it fails. She tells him she feels the same way.

Some time later, Matthew is suing Jake for emotional distress and refuses every settlement he offers. Lainey goes to see him and tells him she will tell his wife about their relationship if he does not drop the case and accept the offered settlement. After leaving his office, Lainey meets with Jake and they rush off to be married.

== Cast ==
- Jason Sudeikis as Jake Harper
- Alison Brie as Elaine "Lainey" Dalton
- Adam Scott as Dr. Matthew Sobvechik
- Katherine Waterston as Emma
- Jason Mantzoukas as Xander
- Andrea Savage as Naomi
- Natasha Lyonne as Kara
- Adam Brody as Sam
- Amanda Peet as Paula
- Marc Blucas as Chris Smith
- Margarita Levieva as Hannah
- Billy Eichner as SLAA Speaker
- Michael Cyril Creighton as Attentive Waiter
- Daniella Pineda as Danica

== Production ==
After the debut of her last film, Bachelorette, Headland became what she would later define as "suicidally depressed" noting that at one point "I was literally wondering, Should I check myself into a psych ward?" To help cope with this she went to Big Sur where she "wrote all day and all night". She realized she wanted to write a movie about sex addiction after entering into a relationship with someone who was already seeing another person, recalling that at one point she drove to his house "I just started crying hysterically. I pulled over and just kept crying. It was sort of like, What is my problem right now? Is it that I'm in love with him? Is it that I feel guilty? Is it that I'm doing something I don't want to do?" From the start she did not set out to make a romantic comedy although when she realized she was making one she wanted to make sure "that it all felt very believable".

For research purposes she attended sexual addiction meetings as well as read many books about the subject, including Your Brain on Sex and the relationship addiction book Leaving the Enchanted Forest.

=== Filming ===
The principal photography of the film took place in New York City in the summer of 2014.

=== Music ===
In October 2014, Andrew Feltenstein and John Nau were hired to compose the music for the film.

== Release ==
The film had its world premiere at the Sundance Film Festival on January 24, 2015. On February 6, 2015, IFC Films had acquired distribution rights to the film. The film premiered at the Sarasota Film Festival on April 17, 2015. The film went on to premiere at the Tribeca Film Festival on April 21, 2015. and then the Montclair Film Festival on May 8, 2015. The Seattle International Film Festival on June 5, 2015 and the Provincetown Film Festival on June 27, 2015. The film had its European premiere at the Edinburgh International Film Festival on June 18, 2015.

The film was released in the United States on September 11, 2015, in a limited release by IFC Films.

=== Critical reception ===
On Rotten Tomatoes, the film has an approval rating of 64% based on 135 reviews, with an average score of 6.1/10. The site's critical consensus reads: "Sleeping with Other People has likable leads and flashes of inspiration, but seems unwilling or unable to surround them with the truly subversive rom-com they deserve." On Metacritic, the film has a weighted average score of 64 out of 100, based on 27 critics, indicating "generally favorable reviews".

Indiewire gave the film a positive review, describing it as "a refreshingly funny and romantic feature that is more than worth falling in love with (again and again)".
