= Uptown Girls =

- Theatrical release poster
- Directed by: Boaz Yakin
- Screenplay by: Julia Dahl; Mo Ogrodnik; Lisa Davidowitz
- Story by: Allison Jacobs
- Produced by: John Penotti; Fisher Stevens; Allison Jacobs
- Starring: Brittany Murphy; Dakota Fanning; Marley Shelton; Donald Faison; Heather Locklear
- Cinematography: Michael Ballhaus
- Edited by: David Ray
- Music by: Joel McNeely
- Production companies: Metro-Goldwyn-Mayer; GreeneStreet Films
- Distributed by: MGM Distribution Co. (United States and Canada); 20th Century Fox (International)
- Release date: August 15, 2003 (U.S.)
- Running time: 92 minutes
- Country: United States
- Language: English
- Budget: $30 million
- Box office: $44.6 million

Uptown Girls is a 2003 American comedy drama film directed by Boaz Yakin and starring Brittany Murphy, Dakota Fanning, Heather Locklear, Marley Shelton, Donald Faison, and Jesse Spencer. The film was adapted by screenwriters Julia Dahl, Mo Ogrodnik and Lisa Davidowitz from a story by Allison Jacobs.

The plot focuses on Molly Gunn, the naïve daughter of a famous rock musician who, after learning her inheritance has been embezzled, finds herself employed as a nanny for a precocious hypochondriac girl named Ray (Fanning) in Manhattan, New York.

Initially panned, the film later gained a more positive reception and has been called a 2000s classic.

== Plot ==
Molly Gunn is a young woman living off the ample trust fund of her late rock star father, Tommy Gunn, who died in a plane crash alongside Molly's mother when she was a child. Molly falls for singer Neal Fox when he plays at her birthday party, thrown by her best friends Huey and Ingrid. Molly and Neal spend days and nights of passion sequestered in her apartment, until Neal leaves abruptly and says that he cannot be a part of her disordered life.

Molly later discovers that Tommy's accountant has embezzled her money, leaving her penniless and homeless. She moves in with Ingrid, on the condition she find a job. So, Molly begins working as a nanny for 8-year-old Lorraine "Ray" Schleine, who exhibits obsessive hypochondriac behaviors.

Ray's mother, Roma, a wealthy music executive, is completely uninvolved in her daughter's life. Her father is in a coma induced by a stroke, and is being treated at home by a private nurse, which causes Ray to repress her emotions and maintain a strict regimen of orderliness. Despite enjoying ballet, Ray refuses to freestyle and often quotes Mikhail Baryshnikov: "Fundamentals are the building blocks of fun." Molly attempts to show her how to have fun, which at first causes conflict between them, but eventually Ray begins to bring her guard down.

Molly continues to pursue Neal and holds onto his lucky jacket in hopes of seeing him again. Thanks to a baking accident, she causes a fire that damages Neal's jacket. Molly redesigns it to fix the damage, but Neal breaks up with her when he sees it, insisting that he has to focus on his music career and does not have time for her flightiness.

Neal soon lands a record deal with Roma and has a hit music video with a song that Molly inspired him to write, all while wearing the jacket she adorned. Disgusted, she agrees to Ingrid's suggestions to sell off her possessions so she can prove that she is growing up. However, after a fight, Ingrid kicks Molly out, so she goes to live with Huey. One night, after fighting with and feeling hurt by Neal again, she sleeps at Ray's place after feeling alone at Huey's apartment and finds Neal one morning, having had sex with Roma.

Molly takes Ray to Coney Island and explains that when her parents died, she fled to Coney Island and rode the tea cups. She encourages Ray to talk to her comatose father, and promises that it will help him improve. However, Ray's father dies the next day, and Ray orders Roma to fire Molly. In Roma's office, Molly chides her for emotionally neglecting Ray. As she leaves, Molly runs into Neal, who begs for a reconciliation, claiming that Molly is his muse. Molly turns Neal down and admonishes him for only caring about her when it is convenient for him. Ray runs away from home and Roma begs Molly to find her. Molly finds Ray at Coney Island, riding in the tea cups. Despite being furious with Molly for raising her hopes, she collapses into Molly's arms, crying.

Molly, deciding to take charge of her own life, takes Ray's advice to auction off Tommy's guitar collection. It goes to an anonymous buyer, enabling her to afford her own apartment. At the wake for Ray's father, several musicians ask Molly to design their clothes after seeing Neal's jacket in his video. She and Ingrid also make amends and Molly finds Ray to apologize as well. She promises to stay friends with her and enrolls in design school after realizing her talent for fashion.

Molly arrives at Ray's recital late and is pleased to see that Ray is wearing the tutu Molly designed for her. Ray dances freestyle to Neal singing "Molly Smiles", a song written for her by Tommy when she was a child. He plays using Tommy's acoustic guitar, while the remaining ballerinas dance with the other guitars from her father's collection.

== Cast ==
- Brittany Murphy as Molly Gunn
- Dakota Fanning as Lorraine "Ray" Schleine
- Marley Shelton as Ingrid, Molly's best friend
- Donald Faison as Huey, Molly's best friend
- Jesse Spencer as Neal Fox, Molly's boyfriend/love interest
- Austin Pendleton as Mr. McConkey, Molly's neighbor
- Heather Locklear as Roma Schleine, Ray's mother
- Pell James as Julie
- Wynter Kullman as Holly
- Amy Korb as Kelli
- Marceline Hugot as Nurse
- Fisher Stevens as Funeral Guest

Additionally, Brian Friedman, Lucy Saroyan, Nas, Carmen Electra, Mark McGrath, Dave Navarro, and Duncan Sheik also appear as celebrity guests during a funeral scene.

== Release ==
=== Box office ===
The film opened at number five behind Freaky Friday, Open Range, S.W.A.T. and Freddy vs. Jason, grossing US$11,277,367 in its opening weekend across 2,495 screens. It remained in theatrical release for nineteen weeks, grossing a total of $37,182,494 in the United States, with an additional $7,434,848 internationally, for a total worldwide gross of $44,617,342.

== Soundtrack ==
Uptown Girls (Music from and Inspired by the Motion Picture) was released by Nettwerk Music Group on August 5, 2003. It includes songs by Jesse Spencer, Leigh Nash of Sixpence None the Richer, Chantal Kreviazuk, and Toby Lightman, amongst others.

=== Track listing ===
Standard edition
| No. | Title | Artist(s) | Length |
|---|---|---|---|
| 1. | "Charmed Life" | Leigh Nash | 3:36 |
| 2. | "Time" | Chantal Kreviazuk | 4:06 |
| 3. | "Slung-Lo" | Erin McKeown | 2:47 |
| 4. | "Spinning Around the Sun" | Martina Sorbara | 4:04 |
| 5. | "Victory" | The Weekend | 3:00 |
| 6. | "On Your Own" | Sense Field | 3:43 |
| 7. | "E is for Everybody" | Cooler Kids | 3:52 |
| 8. | "Sheets of Egyptian Cotton" | Jesse Spencer | 3:09 |
| 9. | "Night of Love" | Jesse Spencer | 3:07 |
| 10. | "Frightened" | Toby Lightman | 3:54 |
| 11. | "The Truth Be Told" | Keram Malicki-Sanchez | 4:39 |
| 12. | "Molly Smiles" | Jesse Spencer | 3:25 |
| 13. | "Solo Piano" | Joel McNeely | 2:02 |
| Total length: | | | 45:24 |

=== Credits ===
- Producers: Keith Brown, Maria Alonte, Maureen Crowe, Peter Zizzo, Steve Mandile, Stewart Lerman
- Executive soundtrack producers: Boaz Yakin, Fisher Stevens, John Penotti, Maria Alonte, Maureen Crowe
- Legal: Alexandria Stuart, Andrew Atkins
- Mastering: Gavin Lurssen
- Coordinators: Jerry Lindahl, Shannon K. Madden

== Critical response ==
Uptown Girls was panned by critics upon release. On the review aggregator website Rotten Tomatoes, 14% of 112 critics' reviews are positive, with an average rating of 4.7/10. The website's consensus reads: "With two obnoxious lead characters and an uneven screenplay, Uptown Girls fails to charm." Metacritic, which uses a weighted average, assigned the film a score of 33 out of 100, based on 30 critics, indicating "generally unfavorable" reviews. Audiences polled by CinemaScore gave the film an average grade of "A–" on an A+ to F scale.

Stephen Holden of The New York Times criticized the film's plot, writing: "In this standard variation of the princess myth, it takes a humbling fall from grace for Molly to gain a smidgen of soul and a glimpse of happily ever after. Once her obnoxiousness has been camouflaged by a thick glaze of saccharine, things magically work out, as they usually do for Hollywood princesses in distress."

David Noh of Film Journal International characterized the film as "fluff", but added: "Murphy creates a rather fascinating chemistry with Fanning, who resolutely absconds with the film as a controlling tot from hell, a fun-killing spinster trapped in a prepubescent body."

A positive review came from Roger Ebert, who awarded the film three stars out of four and likened Murphy to Lucille Ball.

== Legacy ==
Following Murphy's death at the age of 32 on December 20, 2009, Fanning, aged 15, stated that she cherished the time they spent together while working on the film, and that she was "very grateful that [she] had the chance to work with [Murphy]". In 2020, Fanning would go on to describe how on set Murphy taught her to always have fun, telling People, "She was, like, such a ray of light and had such a playful spirit. So I think, just, she made every day special for me. She was so wonderful."

Some writers on the film noted that the film has received more positive response in the years after its release and has been described as a 2000s cult classic. In 2024, The Guardian revisited the film, noting that despite its initial dismissal by critics as "formulaic fluff", it had gone on to find favour with a younger audience for its "charismatic, tender performances", "fairytale vision of post-9/11 Manhattan" and fashion choices, in particular "Murphy's talismanic Blumarine dress".

== Home media ==
Uptown Girls was released to VHS and DVD in Region 1 on January 6, 2004, by MGM Home Entertainment. Olive Films released the film on Blu-ray in 2016.
