= Sidney Kimmel =

American billionaire businessman (born 1928)

- Born: January 16, 1928 (age 98); Philadelphia, Pennsylvania, U.S.
- Occupations: Businessman; film producer
- Spouse: Caroline Davis

Sidney J. Kimmel (born January 16, 1928) is an American businessman, philanthropist, and film producer. He is ranked 2141st in the Forbes list of the richest people alive in 2021.

== Personal life ==
Kimmel was born into a Jewish family in Philadelphia, Pennsylvania, the son of a cab driver. He attended Temple University, but did not graduate. He now lives in California with his wife Caroline Davis, the former wife of Leonard Tose. Kimmel is featured on Old Jews Telling Jokes.

Kimmel and his wife bought Johnny Carson's former estate, a property that sits on the Point Dume promontory in Malibu, California, in 2007 for $46 million. In 2017, they placed the property on the market for $81.5 million. They reduced the price to $65.2 million in August 2018.

== Career ==
Kimmel founded Jones Apparel Group in 1970 while working at W. R. Grace and Company. Five years later, he purchased Jones Apparel Group with a partner. Notable lines produced by Kimmel include Jones New York, Evan-Picone, and 9 West; he also has licensing deals with Ralph Lauren. He stepped down as chief executive officer of Jones in 2002 and sold most of his shares in the publicly traded company, but remained chairman of the board of directors until the sale of the company to Sycamore Partners in 2014. Kimmel funded the erotic drama 9½ Weeks. He owns art, real estate, a film production company Sidney Kimmel Entertainment, and a small stake in the professional NBA basketball team Miami Heat.

=== Sidney Kimmel Entertainment ===
Founded in 2004, Sidney Kimmel Entertainment (SKE) is a Los Angeles-based production, finance and distribution company headed by Kimmel. Films produced include SKE and Screen Gems' 2010 remake Death at a Funeral (2010 film), The Kite Runner (2007), United 93, Breach, Lars and the Real Girl, Adventureland, Synecdoche, New York, Gone (2012), The Place Beyond the Pines (2012) and The Age of Adaline.

== Philanthropy ==
Kimmel is an active philanthropist with an emphasis on healthcare, education, arts and culture. His goal is to donate $1 billion in total throughout his lifetime.

In 1993, Kimmel founded the Sidney Kimmel Foundation. The foundation's Cancer Research division pledged to contribute $120 million to institutions serving healthcare, education, arts and culture. Later, in 2001, the Sidney Kimmel Foundation for Cancer Research donated $150 million to Johns Hopkins University. The donation became the largest single gift ever received by the University, and was directed toward the development of a residence for cancer patients undergoing extended treatment. The gift inspired the university to name the residence the Sidney Kimmel Comprehensive Cancer Center. In total Kimmel has his name attached to four separate cancer-research centers in Philadelphia, New York, San Diego and Baltimore. The Sidney Kimmel Comprehensive Cancer Center at Johns Hopkins Hospital as well as the Sidney Kimmel Comprehensive Cancer Center at Thomas Jefferson University carry his name. The Jefferson Medical College was renamed the Sidney Kimmel Medical College of Thomas Jefferson University in June 2014, following a $110 million grant from the Sidney Kimmel Foundation, the fifth-largest ever gift to a medical school. As of April 2003, Kimmel and the Sidney Kimmel Foundation had donated an estimated $400 million.

Kimmel has also contributed over $35 million to the center for the performing arts in Philadelphia, which is now named The Kimmel Center for the Performing Arts and is home to the world-renowned Philadelphia Orchestra. Other contributions from Kimmel include a $5 million donation to The National Constitution Center in Philadelphia; a $20 million donation to Raymond and Ruth Perelman Jewish Day School in Philadelphia and $25 million for the establishment of a new prostate and urological cancer center at Memorial Sloan-Kettering in New York. In 2003 Kimmel pledged $25 million to The National Museum of American Jewish History in Philadelphia. The construction was said to have cost in total $100 million, and opened in 2006 on the museum's existing site facing Independence Mall. Kimmel donated $25 million to Stand Up To Cancer.

In 2025, Kimmel and his wife contributed $27.5 million to support the soon-to-be-constructed Caroline Kimmel Pavilion for Arts and Communication at Temple University. This is the second largest gift in the university's history, and the new building will be home to the Klein College of Media and Communication and the Center for the Performing and Cinematic Arts. It is set to open in the fall of 2027.

=== Support for cold fusion research ===
Kimmel has given $5.5 million to the University of Missouri to create the Sidney Kimmel Institute for Nuclear Renaissance, SKINR, where researchers will "figure out why excess heat has been observed when hydrogen or deuterium interacts with materials such as palladium, nickel or platinum under extreme conditions.", Originally named "cold fusion," nowadays the name low-energy nuclear reaction (LENR) is also used.

== Filmography ==
Producer

- 9½ Weeks (1986)
- Neverwas (2005)
- Trust the Man (2005)
- Slow Burn (2005)
- Alpha Dog (2006)
- Copying Beethoven (2006)
- Griffin & Phoenix (2006)
- Death at a Funeral (2007)
- Talk to Me (2007)
- Charlie Bartlett (2007)
- Married Life (2007)
- Lars and the Real Girl (2007)
- Synecdoche, New York (2008)
- Management (2008)
- All God's Children Can Dance (2008)
- Adventureland (2009)
- Death at a Funeral (2010)
- The Lincoln Lawyer (2011)
- One for the Money (2012)
- Gone (2012)
- The Place Beyond the Pines (2012)
- Stand Up Guys (2012)
- Parker (2013)
- All Is Bright (2013)
- Mr. Morgan's Last Love (2023) (Co-producer)
- I, Frankenstein (2014)
- Walk of Shame (2014)
- Sleeping with Other People (2015)
- The Age of Adaline (2015)
- Demolition (2015)
- Hell or High Water (2016)
- The Book of Henry (2017)
- Brad's Status (2017)
- Greta (2018)
- The Jesus Rolls (2019)
- Delhi Crime (2019)
- Palmer (2019)
- Alice + Freda Forever (TBA)

Executive producer

- The Clan of the Cave Bear (1986) (Co-executive producer)
- The Night We Never Met (1993)
- Mother (1995) (Direct-to-video)
- Curtain Call (1998)
- Lisa Picard Is Famous (2000)
- Town & Country (2001)
- Crazy Little Thing (2002)
- Separation Anxiety (2002)
- The Emperor's Club (2002)
- Breach (2007)
- The Kite Runner (2007)
- Moneyball (2011)
- Cloudburst (2011)
- Crazy Rich Asians (2018)
- Flag Day (2021)
- Final Cut (2022)
- Thai Cave Rescue (2022)
- God Is a Bullet (2023)
- Mountain Queen: The Summits of Lhakpa Sherpa (2023)

Presenter

- Blame It on Rio (1984)
- Mother (1995)
