= Hell or High Water (film) =

2016 film by David Mackenzie

- Theatrical release poster
- Directed by: David Mackenzie
- Written by: Taylor Sheridan
- Produced by: Sidney Kimmel; Peter Berg; Carla Hacken; Julie Yorn
- Starring: Jeff Bridges; Chris Pine; Ben Foster; Gil Birmingham
- Cinematography: Giles Nuttgens
- Edited by: Jake Roberts
- Music by: Nick Cave; Warren Ellis
- Production companies: Sidney Kimmel Entertainment; OddLot Entertainment; Film 44; LBI Entertainment
- Distributed by: Lionsgate; CBS Films
- Release dates: May 16, 2016 (Cannes); August 12, 2016 (United States)
- Running time: 102 minutes
- Country: United States
- Language: English
- Budget: $12 million
- Box office: $37.9 million

Hell or High Water is a 2016 American neo-Western crime drama film directed by David Mackenzie and written by Taylor Sheridan. It follows two brothers (Chris Pine and Ben Foster), who carry out a series of bank robberies to save their family ranch, while being pursued by two Texas Rangers (Jeff Bridges and Gil Birmingham). It was the final film produced by OddLot Entertainment before its dissolution in 2015.

Hell or High Water premiered at the Un Certain Regard section of the Cannes Film Festival on May 16, 2016, and was theatrically released in the United States on August 12, 2016. It received critical acclaim, particularly for Pine, Foster, and Bridges' performances, Sheridan's screenplay, and the editing. It grossed $37.9 million on a $12 million budget. The American Film Institute selected it as one of its 10 movies of the year, and it was nominated for numerous awards, including four Oscar nominations: Best Picture, Best Supporting Actor (Bridges), Best Original Screenplay, and Best Editing.

The film is the second installment of writer Taylor Sheridan's American Frontier Trilogy, along with Sicario and Wind River.

== Plot ==
In West Texas, brothers Toby and Tanner Howard rob two branches of the Texas Midlands Bank. Though the robberies are well-planned, Tanner's wild nature leads him to take unnecessary risks, frustrating Toby. Their mother has died after a long illness, leaving their ranch in debt because of a reverse mortgage provided by the Texas Midlands Bank, which would lead to the foreclosure of their lands if not settled. Meanwhile, oil has been discovered on their land, and Toby is determined to ensure a comfortable life for his estranged ex-wife and their two sons.

Two Texas Rangers, Marcus Hamilton and Alberto Parker, are assigned to the case. Hamilton, who is close to retirement, investigates the robberies and quickly determines the robbers' methods and personalities. Meanwhile, Tanner robs another bank, unbeknownst to Toby, who sits at a nearby diner. They bury the getaway cars after each robbery. They then launder the stolen money in Oklahoma at an Indian casino, where Toby has the casino convert their "winnings" into a check made out to the Texas Midlands Bank. With untraceable funds, the brothers head back to Texas.

After staking out another branch of the Texas Midlands Bank without success—and where the two Rangers together are temporarily cowed by the "dragon waitress of the T-Bone"—Hamilton figures a pattern to the bank robberies. Determining the next target, Parker and he head there. Pressed for time, the brothers proceed despite the bank being crowded. A shootout ensues with a security guard and an armed civilian; Tanner kills both of them. During the escape, Toby is shot in the back by an armed posse of locals.

The brothers race out of town with the posse in pursuit, before Tanner drives them back with an automatic rifle. The brothers split up; Toby takes the money using another vehicle, while Tanner acts as bait. He draws law enforcement and the posse to a desert mountain ridge, where he takes potshots at officers with a hunting rifle, killing Parker in the process. Distraught, Hamilton enlists a local's knowledge of the area to circle behind Tanner and fatally shoot him.

Meanwhile, Toby passes through a police checkpoint without incident. He launders the stolen cash at a casino, where he sees the news report of his brother's death. He takes the casino's check to the bank just in time to avoid the ranch's foreclosure and deeds the ranch into a family trust.

Following his retirement, Hamilton visits his former office and learns that Toby has been cleared as a suspect, as he has no criminal record nor motive, as his new oil wells earn more in a month than the total stolen in all of the robberies together. The money from the ranch's oil wells is deposited at the Texas Midlands Bank, which refuses to cooperate with the investigation for fear of losing management of the family's trust fund. Despite the lack of evidence, Hamilton remains certain that Toby was the mastermind.

Hamilton confronts Toby at the ranch and demands to know the reason behind the robberies. Toby explains that he has resolved to not let poverty affect his sons as it did Tanner and him. Hamilton tells Toby he holds him responsible for the death of Parker, when the situation quickly turns tense and nearly becomes a standoff. They are interrupted when Toby's ex-wife and children arrive, revealing that Toby gave the ranch to his children rather than keep it for himself. As Hamilton departs, Toby suggests they meet again soon to "finish the conversation" and Hamilton agrees.

== Cast ==
- Jeff Bridges as Texas Ranger Marcus Hamilton
- Chris Pine as Toby Howard
- Ben Foster as Tanner Howard
- Gil Birmingham as Texas Ranger Alberto Parker
- Marin Ireland as Debbie Howard
- Katy Mixon as waitress Jenny Ann
- Dale Dickey as Elsie
- Kevin Rankin as Billy Rayburn
- Melanie Papalia as Hooker
- Amber Midthunder as Natalie Martinez, Vernon bank teller
- Taylor Sheridan as Cowboy
- Margaret Bowman as T-Bone Waitress

== Production ==
=== Development and casting ===
On April 18, 2012, Deadline reported that Sidney Kimmel Entertainment (SKE) had acquired the heist film Comancheria, written by Taylor Sheridan, which SKE would finance and produce with Peter Berg of Film 44. It is the second installment of Sheridan's trilogy of "the modern-day American frontier". At Cinemacon 2016 in Las Vegas, a standee was presented for the film, revealing that the title had been changed to Hell or High Water. Berg was potentially attached to direct the film. Endgame Entertainment and Focus Features were also among the studios bidding for the project against SKE. The script appeared on the Black List in 2012. On April 2, 2015, Jeff Bridges was announced to be set to star, while Chris Pine and Ben Foster were also in talks to join, and David Mackenzie was set to direct the film. On May 4, 2015, Pine and Foster were confirmed to play brothers in the film, who commit bank robberies to save their family's farm in West Texas, while Bridges would play a Texas Ranger set to catch the brothers. CBS Films acquired the U.S. rights to the film, which was produced by Sidney Kimmel of SKE, Peter Berg of Film 44, Carla Hacken of SKE, and Julie Yorn of LBI, with Gigi Pritzker, Bill Lischak, Michael Nathanson, Rachel Shane, John Penotti, Bruce Toll, and Braden Aftergood as executive producers. Sidney Kimmel Entertainment developed the project with Film 44, and OddLot Entertainment co-produced and co-finance the film along with SKE.

In 2022, SK Global was reported to be developing a drama series based on the film for the Fox network.

=== Filming ===
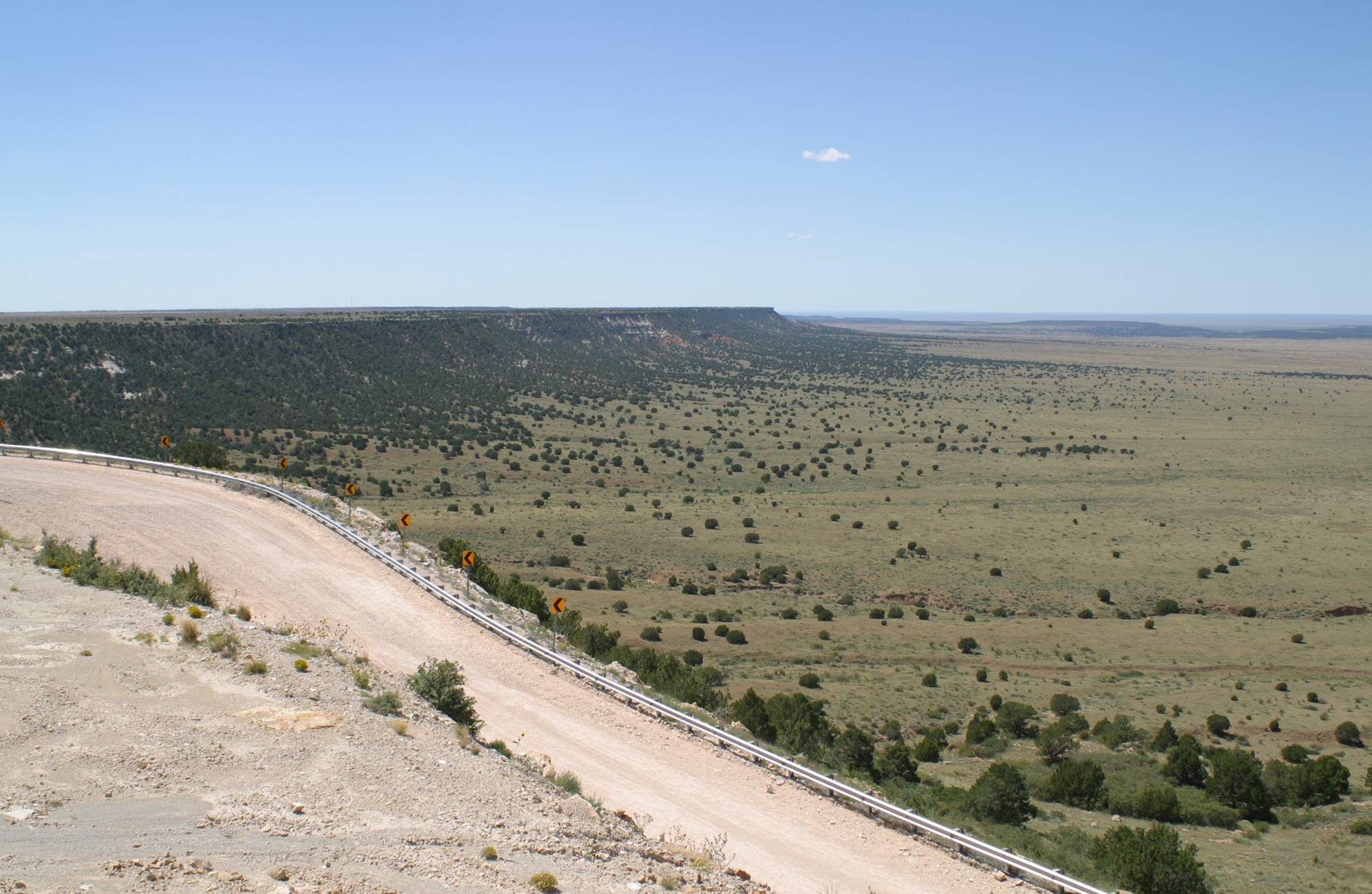
Scenes were shot in Estancia (Torrence County) Alamogordo Valley, Eastern New Mexico

Although the film's plot takes place in West Texas and Oklahoma, filming took place in eastern New Mexico. Principal photography on the film began on May 26, 2015, in Clovis, New Mexico. Filming also took place in other New Mexico communities such as Portales and Tucumcari. Some rural scenes were filmed in the vast and sparsely populated ranch country of Quay and Guadalupe Counties of New Mexico, including scenic shots of Alamogordo Valley south of Luciano Mesa. Filming wrapped on July 8, 2015.

== Release ==
Hell or High Water premiered at the 69th Cannes Film Festival on May 16, 2016. It began a limited release on August 12, 2016, in the U.S., followed by an expansion on August 19, and a wide release on August 26. The film opened in the UK and Ireland on September 9 and in New Zealand on October 21, 2016.

== Reception ==
=== Box office ===
Hell or High Water grossed $27 million in the U.S. and Canada and $10.9 million in other territories, for a worldwide total of $37.9 million, against a production budget of $12 million.

In North America, the film grossed $621,329 from 32 theaters in its opening weekend, for a $19,417 per theater average. The following weekend, Hell or High Water expanded to 472 theaters, grossing $2.7 million (a per theater average of $5,709). The film began its wide release at 909 theaters on August 26, and grossed $3.7 million over the weekend, finishing 12th at the box office.

=== Critical response ===
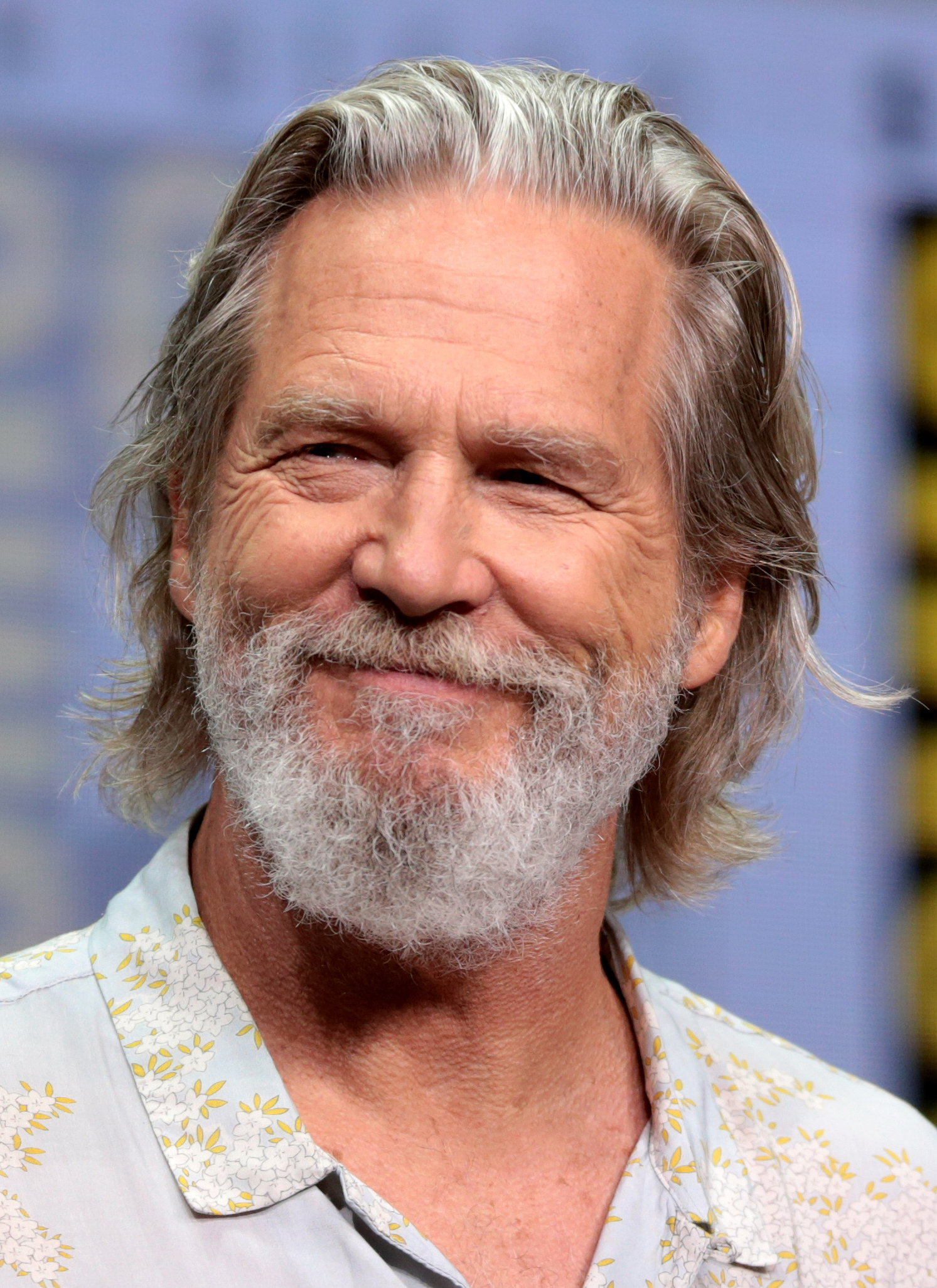
Jeff Bridges' performance garnered critical acclaim and he was nominated for the Academy Award for Best Supporting Actor

Hell or High Water was praised for revitalizing the Western genre. On Rotten Tomatoes, the film has an approval rating of 97% based on 288 reviews, with an average rating of 8.50/10. The website's critical consensus reads, "Hell or High Water offers a solidly crafted, well-acted Western heist thriller that eschews mindless gunplay in favor of confident pacing and full-bodied characters." On Metacritic, the film has a score of 88 out of 100, based on reviews from 47 critics. Audiences polled by CinemaScore gave the film an average grade of "A−" on an A+ to F scale.

Richard Roeper of the Chicago Sun Times gave the film four out of four, saying, "In ways large and small, Hell or High Water is a movie so beautiful and harsh and elegiac and knowing, the moment it was over was the moment I wanted to see it again." IGN reviewer Samantha Ladwig gave the film nine out of ten, saying "Hell or High Water surprises with its complex narrative, stuns with its cinematography, and makes up for this summer's shortcomings." Tom Stempel of Creative Screenwriting praised Hell or High Water as "a fresh, smart, bank robbery-character study and one of the best screenplays so far this year".

In 2021, members of Writers Guild of America West (WGAW) and Writers Guild of America, East (WGAE) voted its screenplay 64th in WGA's 101 Greatest Screenplays of the 21st Century (So Far). In 2025, it was one of the films voted for the "Readers' Choice" edition of The New York Times' list of "the 100 Best Movies of the 21st Century," finishing at number 254.

=== Accolades ===
Hell or High Water received four nominations at the Academy Awards, including Best Picture, Best Supporting Actor for Bridges, Best Original Screenplay and Best Film Editing.
