= Death at a Funeral (2010 film) =

2010 American film

- Theatrical release poster
- Directed by: Neil LaBute
- Screenplay by: Dean Craig
- Based on: Death at a Funeral by Dean Craig
- Produced by: Sidney Kimmel; William Horberg; Chris Rock; Share Stallings; Laurence Malkin
- Starring: Loretta Devine; Peter Dinklage; Danny Glover; Regina Hall; Martin Lawrence; James Marsden; Tracy Morgan; Chris Rock; Zoë Saldaña; Columbus Short; Luke Wilson; Keith David; Ron Glass; Kevin Hart
- Cinematography: Rogier Stoffers
- Edited by: Tracey Wadmore-Smith
- Music by: Christophe Beck
- Production companies: Screen Gems; Sidney Kimmel Entertainment; Wonderful Films; Parabolic Pictures; Stable Way Entertainment
- Distributed by: Sony Pictures Releasing
- Release dates: April 12, 2010 (Hollywood); April 16, 2010 (United States)
- Running time: 92 minutes
- Countries: United States; United Kingdom
- Language: English
- Budget: $21 million
- Box office: $49.1 million

Death at a Funeral is a 2010 American black comedy film directed by Neil LaBute and written by Dean Craig. It is a remake of the 2007 film of the same name, also written by Craig. The film features an ensemble cast including Chris Rock, Martin Lawrence, Danny Glover, Regina Hall, Peter Dinklage, James Marsden, Tracy Morgan, Loretta Devine, Zoë Saldaña, Columbus Short, Luke Wilson, Keith David, Ron Glass and Kevin Hart; Dinklage is the only actor to appear in both films. The film premiered in Hollywood on April 12, 2010, and was released in the United States by Sony Pictures Releasing on April 16, 2010, and received polarized reviews from critics while grossing $49.1 million against a $21 million budget.

== Plot ==
A funeral service is being held for a man named Edward Barnes. His older son Aaron and Aaron's wife Michelle live at his parents' home but have been trying to buy their own and have children. Aaron's younger brother Ryan is a successful author, while Aaron (a tax accountant) has not yet completed his own novel, and resents that Ryan would rather spend money on a first-class airline ticket than help pay for the funeral expenses. There was a delay as the wrong body was delivered but they managed to acquire the casket carrying Edward.

Aaron and Ryan's cousin Elaine and her fiancé Oscar are on their way to pick up Elaine's brother Jeff before heading to the funeral. To ease Oscar's nerves, she gives him a pill from a bottle labeled as Valium. Jeff later reveals to Elaine that it is a powerful hallucinogenic drug he has concocted for a friend. As the eulogy continues, the bizarre escalated; Oscar hallucinates of seeing the coffin that is moving, tips it over, and the body burst out into the floor. Panicked, he locks himself into the bathroom.

Aaron is approached by an unknown guest named Frank Lovett, who reveals himself to be the secret lover of his late father. Frank shows Aaron photos as proof, during which he believes to feel cheated as Edward promised he be taken care of, and threatens to reveal them to Aaron and Ryan's mother Cynthia unless he is paid $30,000. While in shock, Aaron relays the situation to Ryan, who suggests Aaron to pay the money because Ryan claims that he is in debt. When Aaron and Ryan meet with Frank to pay him, Frank starts to deride Aaron's ability as a writer and Aaron refuses to pay. Frank becomes angry; he attacks them, but Aaron and Ryan subdue him, tying him up to prevent him from leaving. Family friend Norman enters the room, giving Frank several doses of what he also believes is Valium to try to calm him down. Jeff also enters the room, telling them that it is the same hallucinogen Oscar took earlier.

When Jeff and Norman, who are supposed to be watching Frank, get distracted by Uncle Russell, Frank releases himself from his bonds and is knocked unconscious upon falling over and hitting his head on a table. With Aaron, Ryan, Jeff and Norman believing that Frank is dead, they plan to put him in the coffin, and their opportunity comes when everyone is outside watching Oscar, who is on the roof naked and threatening to jump off the roof because he has seen Elaine's ex-boyfriend Derek kissing her. Elaine tells Oscar that Derek forcibly kissed her and calms him down by revealing she is pregnant. With everyone back inside, they continue the eulogy. While Aaron awkwardly tries to give his speech, Frank starts banging on the coffin, then suddenly forces it open and emerges. The pictures fall out of Frank's pocket, causing Cynthia to attack Frank in a berserk rage. Aaron yells for everyone's attention as he delivers an impromptu and moving eulogy, saying that his father was a good man with flaws like everyone else.

Aaron and Ryan say goodbye while Ryan gets a ride to the airport from Martina, whom he had been trying to seduce all day. Aaron and Michelle are finally alone when Aaron asks where Uncle Russell is. Michelle tells him that she gave him what she believes is Valium to calm him down, shocking Aaron. Uncle Russell sits on the roof naked, like Oscar had been, remarking that "everything's so f***ing green..."

== Cast ==
- Chris Rock as Aaron Barnes, Edward's eldest son who is an aspiring novelist and the main protagonist
- Keith David as Reverend Davis, the vicar for the funeral
- Loretta Devine as Cynthia Barnes, Aaron and Ryan's mother and Edward's widow
- Peter Dinklage as Frank Lovett, the main antagonist, the lover of Edward, and Aaron and Ryan's father
- Ron Glass as Duncan Barnes, Jeff and Elaine's father, and Edward's younger brother
- Danny Glover as Russell Barnes, the foul-mouthed and short-tempered great-uncle of Aaron, Ryan, Elaine and Jeff, and Edward's uncle
- Regina Hall as Michelle Barnes, Aaron's wife
- Kevin Hart as Brian, a funeral director, who at first brings Aaron the wrong body
- Martin Lawrence as Ryan Barnes, Aaron's selfish younger brother and a successful author
- James Marsden as Oscar, Elaine's fiancé
- Tracy Morgan as Norman, a friend of the Barnes family
- Zoë Saldaña as Elaine Barnes, Aaron and Ryan's cousin
- Columbus Short as Jeff Barnes, Elaine's younger brother, and Aaron and Ryan's other cousin
- Luke Wilson as Derek, Elaine's ex-boyfriend and Norman's best friend
- Regine Nehy as Martina, an 18-year-old high school student who is a family friend to the Barnes Family
- Bob Minor as Edward Barnes, Aaron and Ryan's deceased father

== Reception ==
Review aggregator Rotten Tomatoes reports that 43% of critics have given the film a positive review, based on 134 reviews, with an average rating of 5.30/10. The site's critical consensus reads, "It's amusing and it assembles a talented cast, but Neil LaBute's surprisingly faithful remake of the 2007 Frank Oz dramedy ultimately falls short of the original." Another review aggregator, Metacritic, gave the film a weighted average score of 51 out of 100, based on 25 critics, indicating "mixed or average" reviews. Audiences polled by CinemaScore gave the film an average grade of "B+" on an A+ to F scale.

Roger Ebert of the Chicago Sun-Times gave the film 3 1/2 out of 4 stars, believing it was better than the original. He wrote, "here's the best comedy since The Hangover ... a lot of Death at a Funeral is in very bad taste. That's when I laughed the most."

== See also ==
- List of black films of the 2010s
