= Sidney Kimmel Entertainment =

American film company

Sidney Kimmel Entertainment (SK Global Entertainment)
- Type: Private
- Industry: Film
- Founded: 1997; 29 years ago
- Founder: Sidney Kimmel
- Headquarters: Los Angeles, California, United States
- Key people: John Penotti (president); Carla Hacken (co-president of production); Julie Yorn (co-president of production)
- Website: https://skglobalentertainment.com

Sidney Kimmel Entertainment is an American motion picture and television finance and production company founded in 1997 by film producer Sidney Kimmel. The company focuses on bringing entertainment projects to audiences in association with major studio distribution partners.

== Film production ==
Sidney Kimmel Entertainment has co-financed and produced/co-produced more than 40 motion pictures. SKE releases include the thriller The Lincoln Lawyer, starring Matthew McConaughey, co-produced with Lakeshore Entertainment and distributed by Lionsgate; the 2007 British comedy Death at a Funeral distributed by Metro-Goldwyn-Mayer as well as its 2010 American remake, with co-writer and co-producer Chris Rock leading an all-star ensemble cast, distributed by Screen Gems; Marc Forster's The Kite Runner, based on a novel of the same name, co-produced with DreamWorks Pictures, Participant Productions and Parkes/MacDonald Productions and distributed by Paramount Classics; the critical hit Breach, the true story about an FBI traitor starring Chris Cooper, Ryan Phillippe and Laura Linney; Lars and the Real Girl, starring Ryan Gosling, directed by Craig Gillespie and distributed by Metro-Goldwyn-Mayer; and Oscar-nominated United 93 directed by Paul Greengrass, based on the true story of the doomed flight of 9/11 and distributed by Universal Pictures.

SKE also financed and produced The Place Beyond the Pines, co-written and directed by Derek Cianfrance, starring Ryan Gosling, Bradley Cooper and Eva Mendes. Critically acclaimed, The Place Beyond the Pines was one of the year's top grossing independently financed and produced features and was distributed by Focus Features.

SKE's most recent film, The Age of Adaline, another co-production with Lionsgate and Lakeshore Entertainment, was released on April 24, 2015, starring Blake Lively and Harrison Ford, and directed by Lee Toland Krieger.

The company's other 2015 releases include the comedy Sleeping with Other People, a co-production with Gloria Sanchez Productions, starring Jason Sudeikis, Alison Brie, Adam Scott and Amanda Peet, and directed by Leslye Headland from her original screenplay, for release by IFC Films; and Demolition, a co-production with Black Label Media, starring Jake Gyllenhaal and Naomi Watts and directed by Jean Marc Valle for release by Fox Searchlight.

Recently announced film projects in active development include Book of Henry, an original screenplay written by novelist Gregg Hurwitz to be directed by Colin Trevorrow, and the crime drama Hell or High Water, to star Jeff Bridges, written by Taylor Sheridan and to be directed by David Mackenzie.

== Television production ==
Sidney Kimmel Entertainment has also expanded into television and is developing a limited series entitled Busted, a police crime thriller based on the true exploits and reporting by Pulitzer Prize winning reporters Wendy Ruderman and Barbara Laker. SKE is producing with Anonymous Content.

== Sidney Kimmel Entertainment Global ==
Sidney Kimmel Entertainment recently launched SKE Global, a new joint division with Ivanhoe Pictures. SKE Global will co-finance and co-produce a slate of local language films in China, South Korea, India and other international territories. SKE Global will have the right to participate in Ivanhoe's previously announced ten-picture "India slate" with Jason Blum's Blumhouse Productions. In addition, SKE Global will look to mine the SKE and Ivanhoe Pictures' libraries, a combined 70 English language films, for potential local language remake opportunities. More recently, SK Global signed a first look deal with The Mazur Kaplan Company to adapt books to film and television.

== Filmography ==
- Neverwas (2005)
- Trust the Man (2005)
- Alpha Dog (2006)
- United 93 (2006)
- Copying Beethoven (2006)
- Griffin & Phoenix (2006)
- Breach (2007)
- Death at a Funeral (2007)
- Talk to Me (2007)
- Charlie Bartlett (2007; production company)
- Married Life (2007)
- Lars and the Real Girl (2007)
- The Kite Runner (2007)
- Synecdoche, New York (2008)
- Management (2008)
- All God's Children Can Dance (2008)
- Adventureland (2009)
- Death at a Funeral (2010)
- Unthinkable (2010)
- The Lincoln Lawyer (2011)
- S.O.S/State of Security (2011)
- Cloudburst (2011)
- One for the Money (2012)
- Gone (2012)
- The Place Beyond the Pines (2012)
- Stand Up Guys (2012)
- Parker (2013)
- All Is Bright (2013)
- Mr. Morgan's Last Love (2013)
- I, Frankenstein (2014)
- Walk of Shame (2014)
- The Age of Adaline (2015)
- Sleeping with Other People (2015)
- Demolition (2015)
- Hell or High Water (2016)
- The Book of Henry (2017)
- Brad's Status (2017)
- Greta (2018)
- The Jesus Rolls (2019)
- Palmer (2021)
- God Is a Bullet (2023)
- Mountain Queen: The Summits of Lhakpa Sherpa (2023)
- Anyone but You (2023)
- The Brink of War (2026)
