= All Is Bright =

- Theatrical release poster
- Directed by: Phil Morrison
- Written by: Melissa James Gibson
- Produced by: Elizabeth Giamatti; Dan Carey; Sidney Kimmel; John Penotti
- Starring: Paul Giamatti; Paul Rudd; Sally Hawkins; Amy Landecker
- Cinematography: W. Mott Hupfel III
- Edited by: Jeff Buchanan
- Music by: Graham Reynolds
- Production companies: Greenestreet Films; Sidney Kimmel Entertainment; Touchy Feely Films
- Distributed by: Anchor Bay Films
- Release dates: April 18, 2013 (Tribeca); September 10, 2013 (United States)
- Running time: 107 minutes
- Country: United States
- Language: English
- Box office: $4,556

All Is Bright (released as Almost Christmas in the UK) is a 2013 comedy-drama film directed by Phil Morrison. It stars Paul Giamatti and Paul Rudd, with Sally Hawkins and Amy Landecker in supporting roles.

The film debuted at the 2013 Tribeca Film Festival, with a video on demand release following on September 10, 2013. It was released in theaters on October 4, 2013.

== Plot ==
Out on parole in Quebec after serving four years for stealing, Dennis (Giamatti) returns home to find that his wife Therese has told his daughter Michi he has died of cancer. He also discovers his old friend and former accomplice Rene (Rudd) is in a relationship with his ex.

Dennis has a brief fit of rage at Therese and later lands one punch on Rene. Homeless and desperate for work as there is a recession, he reluctantly asks Rene if he can go with him to sell Christmas trees in New York City. Dennis wants to make enough money to buy his estranged daughter the piano she has always wanted.

In Brooklyn, Dennis gets thrown out of a café and the following day has an altercation with another tree salesman. Finally Olga, a Russian-born woman, buys the first tree and they gradually start hustling and moving their trees.

Olga asks Dennis to straighten the tree as an excuse, to the house where she cleans for a couple of dentists, offering him food and a shower. The next day the men are hit with a tree selling rush. Amidst the sales, Rene's wife Marie calls, letting him know she wants him to sign the divorce papers. Upset, he takes off for a few days, so Dennis is left in charge.

When Rene reappears, he has an engagement ring for Therese. Dennis becomes irate, telling two guys looking to buy a tree that his friend stole his wife from him while he was in prison. He becomes inspired to call his ex collect, but she does not accept the charges. Distraught, he visits Olga the next day and asks her to help him find his daughter a piano.

Olga visits them at their tree-selling lot with vodka, and she, Rene, Dennis and Nzomo, an African who had helped with the tree selling, drink through the night. The next day, as Dennis and Rene are robbed by a supposedly blind man who had bought a tree from them, Dennis convinces Olga to help them take the dentists' Steinway.

Returning to their small Quebec town, Dennis watches from a distance as Michi plays her new piano, then hugs her mom and Rene happily.

== Cast ==
- Paul Giamatti as Dennis
- Paul Rudd as Rene
- Sally Hawkins as Olga
- Amy Landecker as Therese
- Peter Hermann as Monsieur Tremblay
- Emory Cohen as Lou
- Halley Feiffer as Claire
- Colman Domingo as Nzomo
- Curtiss Cook as Kevin

== Production ==
The opening of the movie is set in Quebec, Canada, and appears to have been shot in Quebec, Canada. We see an Autoroute 40 and 80 kph highway signs as Paul Giamatti walks along the highway. Later we see Paul on a sidewalk with cars bearing Quebec license plates and he stops to pick up a Loonie.

After loading the trees the "Paul and Paul" drive to the USA. We see they actually filmed a scene on Ontario's 401 Westbound, approaching exit 441, to Ontario Highway 137, which leads to the US border and connects to interstate 81 (NY).

All Is Bright was filmed in Greenpoint, Brooklyn. Its name was changed from the original title of Almost Christmas to All Is Bright.

The antics of the two lead characters have been suggested to be based on the amalgamation of famous misadventures of employees from North Pole Xmas Trees, a famous family business from Nashua, New Hampshire.

== Reception ==
The film has a 49% approval rating on Rotten Tomatoes based on 41 reviews, with an average rating of 5.6/10. The critical consensus states: "Well-acted but uneven, All Is Bright strands a pair of strong performances from Paul Giamatti and Paul Rudd in a meandering script." Metacritic reports a weighted average of 54 out of 100 based on reviews from 15 critics, indicating "mixed or average" reviews.

== See also ==
- List of Christmas films
