= Thai Cave Rescue =

2022 TV series produced by Netflix

- Thai: ถ้ำหลวง: ภารกิจแห่งความหวัง
- Genre: Historical; Thriller
- Created by: Michael Russell Gunn; Dana Ledoux Miller
- Directed by: Kevin Tancharoen; Nattawut Poonpiriya
- Countries of origin: Thailand; United States
- Original languages: Thai; English
- No. of episodes: 6

Production
- Executive producers: Kevin Tancharoen; Nattawut Poonpiriya; Jon M. Chu; John Penotti
- Cinematography: Glen MacPherson; Adam Suschitzky

Original release
- Network: Netflix
- Release: 22 September 2022

Thai Cave Rescue (Thai: ถ้ำหลวง: ภารกิจแห่งความหวัง) is a six-part limited series produced by Netflix, directed by Kevin Tancharoen and Nattawut Poonpiriya. It was released on 22 September 2022.

== Premise ==
The series is based on the events of the Tham Luang cave rescue that occurred in Tham Luang-Khun Nam Nang Non National Park during June and July 2018, in which twelve members of the Wild Boars youth football team and their assistant coach were rescued from the flooded Tham Luang Nang Non cave system.

== Cast ==
- Papangkorn "Beam" Lerkchaleampote as Coach Eak
- Thaneth Warakulnukroh as Governor Narongsak Osottanakorn
- Supakorn Kitsuwon as Saman Gunan
- Bloom Varin as Colonel Bhak Loharjun
- Urassaya Sperbund as Kelly, a Thai-American hydrology expert
- Manatsanun Panlertwongsakul as Pim, a park ranger
- Christopher Stollery as Rick Stanton
- Nicholas Farnell as John Volanthen
- Rodger Corser as Richard Harris
- Damon Herriman as Craig Challen
- Nicholas Bell as Vern Unsworth
- Arisara Wongchalee
- Tassarin Punphae
- Kenneth Won as Jirasak, a geologist

The twelve members of the Wild Boars football team are played by Pratya Patong (as Titan), Songpol Kantawong (as Tee), Chakkapat Sisat (as Pong), Thanawut Chetuku (as Dul), Teeraphat Somkaew (as Bew), Thanaphong Kanthawong (as Dom), Thanapat Phungpumkaew (as Night), Aphisit Yookham (as Nick), Watcharaphol Puangsawan (as Mig), Thapanot Huttapasu (as Mark), Apisit Saengchan (as Tle), and Rattaphoom Nakeesathid (as Note).

== Production ==
In 2019, Netflix received the rights from 13 Tham Luang Company Limited, a company set up to oversee the story rights of the rescued members of the Wild Boars football team, to produce the series. Although there have been a number of films produced concerning the events, Thai Cave Rescue is the only dramatic production that was granted access to the members of the Wild Boars, and featured their perspectives of their ordeal.

On 23 August 2021, the production team of the series arrived at Tham Luang-Khun Nam Nang Non in Chiang Rai Province to prepare for the filming. Filming was conducted in the real homes of the members of the Wild Boars team as well as in the cave itself. During production, the crew experienced difficulties when Thailand was locked down due to the COVID-19 pandemic. As a result of restrictions, the number of extras was reduced and crowd scenes were drastically scaled down.
