= The Place Beyond the Pines =

2012 film by Derek Cianfrance

- Theatrical release poster
- Directed by: Derek Cianfrance
- Screenplay by: Derek Cianfrance; Ben Coccio; Darius Marder
- Story by: Derek Cianfrance; Ben Coccio
- Produced by: Sidney Kimmel; Jamie Patricof; Lynette Howell Taylor; Alex Orlovsky
- Starring: Ryan Gosling; Bradley Cooper; Eva Mendes; Dane DeHaan; Emory Cohen; Rose Byrne; Mahershala Ali; Bruce Greenwood; Harris Yulin; Ben Mendelsohn; Ray Liotta
- Cinematography: Sean Bobbitt
- Edited by: Jim Helton; Ron Patane
- Music by: Mike Patton
- Production companies: Sidney Kimmel Entertainment; Electric City Entertainment; Verisimilitude
- Distributed by: Focus Features
- Release dates: September 7, 2012 (Toronto); March 29, 2013 (United States)
- Running time: 140 minutes
- Country: United States
- Languages: English; Spanish
- Budget: $15 million
- Box office: $47.1 million

The Place Beyond the Pines is a 2012 American epic crime drama film directed by Derek Cianfrance, from a screenplay by Cianfrance, Ben Coccio, and Darius Marder, and based on a story by Cianfrance and Coccio. Starring Ryan Gosling, Bradley Cooper, Eva Mendes, Dane DeHaan, Emory Cohen, Rose Byrne, Mahershala Ali, Bruce Greenwood, Harris Yulin, Ben Mendelsohn, and Ray Liotta, the film follows three linear stories: Luke Glanton (Gosling), a motorcycle stunt rider who supports his ex-lover Romina Gutierrez (Mendes) and their newborn son through a life of crime; Avery Cross (Cooper), an ambitious police officer who confronts his corrupt police department; and Jason (DeHaan) and A.J. (Cohen), two troubled teenagers who explore the aftermath of Luke and Avery's actions fifteen years later.

Cianfrance was inspired to write The Place Beyond the Pines based on his experiences as a father. Coccio and Marder, who shared similar interests in film and media, helped write the script. Cianfrance envisioned the main themes to be about fathers and sons, masculine identity, and legacy. The film reunites Cianfrance and Gosling, who had previously worked together on Blue Valentine (2010). The role of Luke was written for Gosling, as he expressed an interest in playing a bank robber.

Principal photography took place in Schenectady, New York, during the summer of 2011. Though the film contains a disclaimer that its events are entirely fictitious, critics have theorized that the police corruption depicted therein was based upon a 2002 scandal in which five officers, including former Schenectady Police Chief Gregory Kaczmarek, were indicted by the United States Department of Justice for their participation in a local narcotics distribution ring.

The Place Beyond the Pines premiered at the Toronto International Film Festival on September 7, 2012, and was theatrically released in the United States on March 29, 2013. The film received positive reviews from critics and was a modest box office success, grossing $47.1 million against its $15 million production budget. Gosling was nominated for the Satellite Award for Best Actor in a Supporting Role at the 18th Satellite Awards and the film was nominated for the inaugural Saturn Award for Best Thriller Film at the 40th Saturn Awards.

== Plot ==
In 1994, Luke Glanton is a motorcycle stuntman with a traveling carnival. In Schenectady, he meets his ex-lover Romina Gutierrez, who is now with a man named Kofi Kancam and has a son, Jason. When Romina tells Luke that he is Jason's real father, he quits the carnival to stay nearby. Romina is doubtful Luke can provide for them.

During a spirited ride through the woods, Luke impresses auto-mechanic Robin Van Derk Hook and begins working part-time for him. When Luke asks for more work to support his family, Robin reveals his past as a bank robber and suggests they commit robberies together. Luke robs the banks at gunpoint and drives his motorcycle into a box truck driven by Robin. Luke uses his share of the money to get close to Romina and Jason.

One day, Luke lets himself into Romina and Kofi's house to assemble a crib for Jason. When Kofi demands he leave, Luke strikes him with a wrench and is arrested. Robin bails him out of jail but refuses to do any more heists, fearing Luke is too reckless, and dismantles Luke's bike. Luke gives his share of the robberies to Romina who wants nothing to do with him anymore, then steals money from Robin to pay for a new bike.

Luke botches his first attempt robbing a bank alone, resulting in an auto chase and his pursuit by rookie cop Avery Cross. After crashing, Luke breaks into a house and calls Romina, asking her not to tell Jason about him. Avery confronts Luke and panics when he sees his gun, shooting first and wounding Luke in the stomach. Luke fires back, hitting Avery in the leg, before falling out a window to his death.

Avery, a married man with a baby son named A.J., is hailed as a hero for killing the "Moto Bandit". Though troubled by Luke's death, he lies to the District Attorney that Luke fired first. A group of corrupt officers pressure Avery to help them find the money from Luke's bank robberies from Romina's home, resulting in Avery holding baby Jason as he sleeps while another officer retrieves the cash. Avery tries to return his cut to Romina, who rejects it. When his chief refuses to go after the corrupt officers, Avery secretly records one of them asking him to steal evidence and leverages the recordings into an assistant district attorney position.

Fifteen years later, Avery is running for Attorney General of New York. A.J., now a rebellious teenager, moves in with his father and transfers to Schenectady High School, befriending the now-teenage Jason, with neither boy knowing the history between their fathers. When the teens are arrested for drug possession, Avery recognizes Jason's name and gets his charge dropped to a misdemeanor. He orders A.J. to stay away from him.

Kofi, now Jason's legal stepfather, tells Jason his birth father's name, which allows him to discover Luke's past. Jason visits Robin, who tells him about Luke and their friendship. A.J. pressures Jason to steal OxyContin for a party. At the party, Jason discovers that A.J.'s father is the man who killed Luke. Jason provokes a fight with A.J., who savagely beats him. Awaking in the hospital, Jason angrily calls Romina a liar. After being discharged, Jason runs away from home and buys a gun from his drug dealer.

Jason goes to the Cross family home, assaults A.J., and takes Avery hostage. He forces him to drive into the woods where Avery breaks down and apologizes for Luke's death. Jason steals Avery's wallet but leaves him unharmed. Inside, Jason finds a photo of himself as a baby with his parents, which Avery had taken from the evidence locker.

Some time later, Avery wins his election and celebrates with A.J. at his side. Jason mails Romina the old photograph, then buys a motorcycle and rides away.

== Cast ==
- Ryan Gosling as Luke Glanton
- Bradley Cooper as Avery Cross
- Eva Mendes as Romina
- Dane DeHaan as Jason
- Emory Cohen as AJ
- Rose Byrne as Jennifer
- Mahershala Ali as Kofi
- Bruce Greenwood as Bill Killcullen
- Harris Yulin as Al Cross
- Ben Mendelsohn as Robin
- Ray Liotta as Deluca
- Robert Clohessy as Chief Weirzbowski
- Gabe Fazio as Scott
- Olga Merediz as Malena

== Production ==
=== Development ===
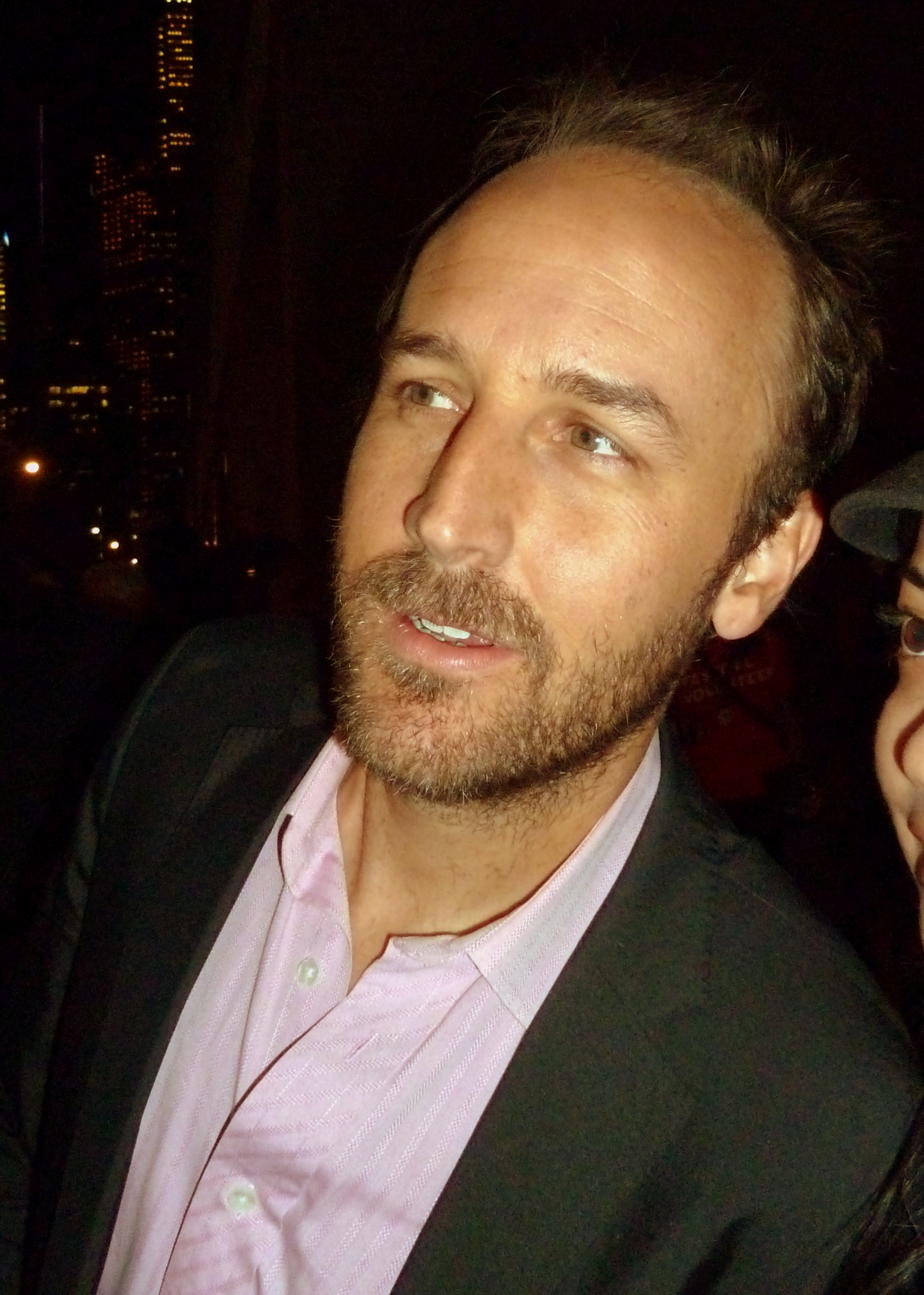
Director Derek Cianfrance said the film's story came from his own personal life.

Cianfrance's inspiration for the story first started when he saw Abel Gance's 1927 silent film Napoleon, which uses a triptych (three-screen) technique to play out multiple stories at once. In 2007, the birth of Cianfrance's second son reignited the idea, and he started to think about being a father again and the responsibilities involved. "That got me to thinking about the fire I felt inside me, which had been with me for as long as I could remember. It helped me to do many things. But it was also, many times, a destructive and painful force", he said. He stated it was important for him, as an artist, to do something personal and challenging. He also read the works of Jack London, including the novel The Call of the Wild, and became intrigued with the idea of legacy and what our ancestors had to do for survival. Shortly, Cianfrance met Ben Coccio, who shared a similar interest of books and films, and they began writing the screenplay. The third screenwriter, Darius Marder, joined the project four months before principal photography began.

Meanwhile, Cianfrance was still working on the film Blue Valentine (2010), which stars Ryan Gosling. In 2007, Gosling told him about a fantasy which involved "robbing a bank, on a motorcycle, and then making a very specific getaway." Cianfrance told Gosling, "You've got to be kidding me, I'm writing that movie right now." The pair shared numerous identical ideas, and knew that The Place Beyond the Pines would be an opportunity to work together again. Cianfrance envisioned the story to be about fathers and sons, masculine identity, "reinvention or transformation of the self for a man over a period". He added, "It's about legacy—what we're born with and what we pass on. It's about the choices we make and how those choices echo throughout generations. It's a classic tale of the sins of the father being visited upon the son".

While Cianfrance is not a fan of violence in film, he is drawn to displaying the narrative of it and "how a gun could come in" and affect peoples' lives. The first draft of the script ran over 160 pages, which required much refinement from the three writers. Once filming began, they had produced 37 versions of the script. Coccio came up with the title from the Iroquoios translation of Schenectady—"the place beyond the pines". The city is where Coccio spent his childhood, and Cianfrance frequently visits. The writers sent the final script to Sidney Kimmel Entertainment; they financed the film and gave the director and crew "a lot of trust, space and time".

Director Derek Cianfrance revealed that Bradley Cooper nearly quit the film after receiving a rewritten script. "I had given [screenwriter Darius Marder] the script and he had a lot of notes for it, and I kind of agreed with a lot of what he was saying. And so we rewrote every word from 10 weeks to six weeks," he recalled. "I remember giving Bradley Cooper the copy of The Place Beyond the Pines, the new script, and getting a voice message from him saying, 'Bro, I just want to let you know I read the new draft and I'm out.'" Cianfrance claimed Cooper was frustrated because it was "not the movie that we had signed up to do." So the filmmaker said he paid a visit to the actor to hopefully change his mind, notably since the film was partially funded due to Cooper's involvement. "I was moving my family up to Schenectady the next day, and the whole crew was coming up there. I had all the money anyway," the director added. "I was like, 'Can I come talk to you?' So I went up to Montreal, and I had a long conversation with him from midnight to 3:30 in the morning where I got him back on. It was only in the last five minutes [he was convinced]. I think he just got tired. He wanted to go to bed."

=== Casting ===
While the role of Luke Glanton was created for Ryan Gosling, Bradley Cooper was offered the role of Avery Cross, due to the two sharing a similar type of charisma, and both bringing a "different energy" to the screen. Cooper was hesitant signing on for the role, but Cianfrance adapted the script for Cooper, and told him that he would not make the film without him. Cianfrance considered a number of actresses for the role of Romina Gutierrez, but he wanted to cast Eva Mendes from the beginning. "She has such a magnetic screen presence [...] I saw the deep, thoughtful, warm, generous, unpredictable person inside Eva", he said.

The role of Peter Deluca was written for Ray Liotta, who starred in one of Cianfrance's favorite films, Goodfellas (1990). Over 500 boys auditioned for the roles of Jason Glanton and A. J. Cross, with Dane DeHaan and Emory Cohen being selected, respectively. Cianfrance recalls that in the boys' first audition together, their discussion about favorite actors produced a "conflict", and he thought this chemistry would translate well on screen. Greta Gerwig was reported to join the cast as Jennifer Cross, but the part went to Rose Byrne instead.

=== Filming ===
Principal photography began in the summer of 2011, lasted for 47 days and took place in Schenectady, New York. Filming locations included real places, such as banks, police stations, a hospital, high school and town fair. Cianfrance said it was important that real places were used for "sense of place and truth". While filming in these places, the extras were also real: bank tellers, police officers, hospital patients and staff, and students. Some of the cast, including Cooper and Ray Liotta, spent time with real police officers in Schenectady to learn about their roles. The production went smoothly except for when Hurricane Irene struck the city which flooded the equipment trucks. The crew took a canoe to the truck and rescued the film footage that was left behind, and continued filming the next day.

Cianfrance considered the cast to be collaborators, and encouraged them to improvise some of their dialogue to make it "alive" and "true". Remarking on his directing style, he said "I'm not a dictator on set, I don't force my actors to do things. I allow a democracy of ideas on set". He also demanded utmost commitment from the cast and crew, despite them not staying in luxury hotels or big trailers, and filming in places with bee hives and mosquito infestations. Gosling learned to ride a motorcycle for filming the action scenes, and trained with stuntman Rick Miller for two months. Gosling performed many of his own stunts; in one robbery scene, he rode in heavy traffic while being pursued by police, which required 22 takes to perfect. He also gained 40 pounds (18 kg) of muscle and worked with designer Ben Shields to design tattoos for his character's body.

Sean Bobbitt served as cinematographer, who preferred using handheld cameras and natural lighting. Cianfrance saw Bobbitt's experience as a war photographer as an advantage, and was impressed with his process and sense of composition, which proved useful for a scene in the beginning which featured a tracking shot towards the globe of death. Bobbitt initially stood inside the globe to capture footage of the motorcyclists, but a bike hit his head and he suffered a concussion. As a result, the director did not allow him inside again. Editing proved to be a challenge due to the amount of story to explore, and the rough cut of the film ran in excess of three hours. Cianfrance's close friends, Jim Helton and Ron Patane, served as editors which made the experience "bearable". The final cut of the film took nine months, working 16 hours a day, seven days a week, to complete.

== Music ==
The score for The Place Beyond the Pines was composed by Mike Patton, who, according to Cianfrance, "understood the haunted qualities of the story". Cianfrance had been a fan of Patton's work since the early 1990s and described his work as "cinematic". The soundtrack album features a selection of music by various artists including Arvo Pärt, Bon Iver, Ennio Morricone, and Vladimir Ivanoff. The album was released by Milan Records on March 26, 2013.

== Release ==
=== Theatrical ===
The Place Beyond the Pines premiered at the Toronto International Film Festival on September 7, 2012. Shortly after, Focus Features announced their decision to acquire the U.S. distribution rights from Sidney Kimmel Entertainment. Focus CEO James Schamus and president Andrew Karpen said, "Derek Cianfrance has made a bold, epic, and emotionally generous saga, once again showing a master's hand in eliciting searingly beautiful performances from the actors with whom he collaborates."

=== Home media ===
The Place Beyond the Pines was released on DVD and Blu-ray on August 6, 2013. A limited edition steelbook was also released, which included audio commentary from the director, deleted and extended scenes, as well as behind-the-scenes footage. Shout! Factory announce that the film was released on 4K Ultra HD Blu-ray On October 21, 2025 alongside the other films they were released.

== Reception ==
=== Box office ===
The film received a limited release in the United States on March 29, 2013, followed by a wide release on April 12, 2013. The Place Beyond the Pines grossed $21.4 million in the United States and Canada, and $25.6 million in other territories, for a worldwide total of $47.1 million, against a budget of $15 million.

=== Critical response ===
On the review aggregator website Rotten Tomatoes, 79% of 225 critics' reviews are positive, with an average rating of 7.2/10. The website's consensus reads: "Ambitious to a fault, The Place Beyond the Pines finds writer/director Derek Cianfrance reaching for—and often grasping—thorny themes of family, fatherhood, and fate." Metacritic, which uses a weighted average, assigned the film a score of 68 out of 100, based on 42 critics, indicating "generally favorable" reviews.

Writing for the IndieWire "Playlist" blog, Kevin Jagernauth praised the film as an "ambitious epic that is cut from some of the same thematic tissue as Cianfrance's previous film, but expands the scope into a wondrously widescreen tale of fathers, sons and the legacy of sins that are passed down through the generations". The Daily Telegraph critic, Robbie Collin, drew attention to the film's "lower-key and largely un-starry third act" that was criticized in early reviews. "In fact, it's the key to deciphering the entire film," he wrote. Collin drew parallels between Gosling's character and James Dean's Jim Stark in Rebel Without a Cause (1955), and said Cianfrance's film was "great American cinema of the type we keep worrying we've already lost." Toronto Star's Peter Howell gave the film a positive review, writing "The Place Beyond the Pines flirts with exhaustion and threatens credulity with its extreme generational conflicts and use of coincidence. Cianfrance and his sterling cast keep it all together [...] There's a palpable sense of teamwork that brings out the best in all of these players." Claudia Puig of USA Today complimented the film for its "insightful study of masculinity", visual style and engaging look at a multi-generational saga. Puig opined that it was one of 2013's boldest films.

Writing for the Los Angeles Times, Betsy Sharkey described the film as "intimate" and praised the actors' performances despite a bulky script. In his review for Chicago Tribune, Michael Phillips gave the film 3½ out of 4 stars; he thought the transition between the three stories gave the film humanistic quality. "The people in it really do seem like people, not pieces of plot", he wrote. However, he was critical of the last third of the film, which felt long, but credited the cinematography, music and editing for keeping the "momentum flowing subtly". David Rooney of The Hollywood Reporter praised the acting, cinematography, atmosphere, and score, but criticized the film's narrative flow. Henry Barnes of The Guardian gave a mixed review, writing: "The Place Beyond the Pines is ambitious and epic, perhaps to a fault. It's a long, slow watch in the final act, a detour into the next generation that sees the sons of Luke and Avery pick away at their daddy issues together. Cianfrance signposts the ripple effects of crime with giant motorway billboards, then pootles along, following a storyline that drops off Mendes and Byrne before winding on to its obvious conclusion." Slant Magazine's Ed Gonzalez gave the film a negative review, and criticized the film's plot, themes, "self-importance", shallow characters, and melodramatic nature.

Top-ten lists

The film appeared in the following critics' top-ten lists:

- 5th — Randy Myers, The Mercury News
- 6th — Kristopher Tapley, HitFix
- 6th — Richard Lawson, Vanity Fair
- 7th — Staff writers' vote, Total Film
- 9th — Den of Geek
- 10th — Lisa Kennedy, The Denver Post
- 10th — Steve Persall, Tampa Bay Times
- No order — Stephen Witty, The Star-Ledger
- No order — Claudia Puig, USA Today

=== Accolades ===
| Organization | Award | Recipient(s) | Result | Ref |
|---|---|---|---|---|
| Australian Film Critics Association Awards | Best International Film (English Language) | The Place Beyond the Pines | Nominated | |
| Dublin Film Critics' Circle Awards | Best Director | Derek Cianfrance | Nominated | |
| Dublin Film Critics' Circle Awards | Best Screenplay | Ben Coccio, Darius Marder and Derek Cianfrance | Nominated | |
| Dublin Film Critics' Circle Awards | Best Cinematography | Sean Bobbitt | Nominated | |
| Satellite Awards | Best Supporting Actor | Ryan Gosling | Nominated | |
| National Board of Review | Top Ten Independent Films | The Place Beyond the Pines | Won | |
| Saturn Awards | Best Thriller Film | The Place Beyond the Pines | Nominated | |
| Golden Trailer Awards | Best Independent Trailer | The Place Beyond the Pines | Nominated | |
| Golden Trailer Awards | Best Independent Poster | The Place Beyond the Pines | Nominated | |
| Golden Trailer Awards | Most Original Poster | The Place Beyond the Pines | Nominated | |
