= Brad's Status =

2017 American film by Mike White

- Theatrical release poster
- Directed by: Mike White
- Written by: Mike White
- Produced by: Dede Gardner; Jeremy Kleiner; Sidney Kimmel; David Bernad
- Starring: Ben Stiller; Austin Abrams; Jenna Fischer; Luke Wilson; Jemaine Clement; Michael Sheen
- Cinematography: Xavier Pérez Grobet
- Edited by: Heather Persons
- Music by: Mark Mothersbaugh
- Production companies: Sidney Kimmel Entertainment; Plan B Entertainment
- Distributed by: Amazon Studios; Annapurna Pictures
- Release dates: September 9, 2017 (TIFF); September 15, 2017 (United States)
- Running time: 101 minutes
- Country: United States
- Language: English
- Box office: $3.8 million

Brad's Status is a 2017 American comedy-drama film written and directed by Mike White and starring Ben Stiller, Austin Abrams, Michael Sheen, Jenna Fischer, and Luke Wilson.

40-something father Brad Sloan, while taking his son Troy to tour colleges on the East Coast, meets up with an old college friend, who makes him doubt his life choices.

The film premiered on September 9 at the 2017 Toronto International Film Festival in the juried Platform section, and was theatrically released by Amazon Studios and Annapurna Pictures on September 15, 2017.

== Plot ==
Brad Sloan runs his own NPO, and lives comfortably with his loving wife Melanie and son Troy, but envies his old friends Craig Fisher, Billy Wearslter, Jason Hatfield, and Nick Pascale's wealth and accomplishments. Craig works in the White House and is a best-selling author; Jason owns a hedge fund firm; Billy sold a company he founded, moved to Maui, and retired; and Nick is a Hollywood director. Melanie insists they do not need to compare themselves with the wealthiest 1%.

In the morning, Brad and Troy leave for Boston to visit colleges. Harvard is Troy's goal, which Brad applauds to make up for his own lost ambitions. Arriving at Harvard's admissions, they discover they have missed the appointment by one day. Brad becomes argumentative, but Troy makes him stop. Melanie convinces Brad to call Craig. When Brad calls Billy for Craig's number, he learns Nick had got married a while ago but no one told him.

His friends' exclusion confirms his fears: that he is a failure. Brad also reflects upon his waning sex life with Melanie, blaming her being easily satisfied as undermining his ambitions. At a restaurant, Brad confesses to Troy that he feels left out. Craig gets Troy meetings both with a famous Harvard music professor and the dean of admissions.

Brad and Troy meet Ananya, Troy's high school musician friend, and her friend Maya. Brad relishes Ananya's idealism and her respect for his work, reminding him of his youth. She also reveals that Craig's lectures are both sexist and arrogant. After having dinner with them, Brad and Troy return to their hotel rather than go for drinks.

Sleepless, Brad finds the undergrads in the bar. Telling Anaya going non-profit was a mistake, although he has lost her admiration, he goes on about his "career mistakes" compared to his friends. Ananya calls him privileged, as many in India go hungry, so he should be grateful for what he has.

Craig arranges for Troy to meet his hero music composer. However, when he is underwhelmed upon meeting his idol, Brad insists Troy not judge people for selling out. The argument blows over and Troy attends his interview.

During the interview, Jason hurriedly calls Brad, which he initially ignores because of his self-focus. Jason is at the Mayo Clinic because his 3-year old daughter has a tethered spine. Shaken by the news, Brad forgets to ask Troy how his interview went. Troy thinks it went really well.

Brad then accompanies Troy to his alma mater Tufts, where he learns his old professor just died. Watching Troy go on the campus tour, his thoughts are interrupted when Melanie calls back. He expresses his pride in their son and wishes she were there with them.

The next night, Brad has dinner with Craig to properly thank him. He discovers that his old friends, those he believed are leading privileged lives, actually have major problems. Not only is Jason Hatfield's daughter seriously ill, but his company is under legal investigation. He also learns Billy Wearslter is an addict and alcoholic.

Craig expresses some homophobic remarks about Nick, then constantly brags and makes backhanded compliments. Initially, Brad tolerates this, but eventually feels conflicted, questioning if they truly are friends. When Craig seems confused at Brad's reaction, Brad abruptly leaves dinner.

Brad joins Troy at Ananya and Maya's orchestral performance, explaining he would rather be there with him. The beautiful music transports Brad into feeling emotional and reflective, realizing he still loves the world. After returning to the hotel that evening, Troy asks his father if he is having a nervous breakdown. Brad says he sometimes senses that people view him as a failure. Troy explains that everyone is so self-absorbed, they do not even consider Brad at all. Troy adds that the only opinion that matters is his, and he loves him. Brad feels both touched and mollified.

Trying to imagine the future, Brad repeats, "We're still alive. I am still alive," as he falls asleep. After the credits, Brad again visualises Troy busking.

== Cast ==
- Ben Stiller as Brad Sloan
- Austin Abrams as Troy Sloan
  - Devon Packer as young Troy Sloan
- Jenna Fischer as Melanie Sloan
- Michael Sheen as Craig Fisher
- Luke Wilson as Jason Hatfield
- Jemaine Clement as Billy Wearslter
- Mike White as Nick Pascale
- Jimmy Kimmel as himself
- Shazi Raja as Ananya

== Production ==
On July 13, 2016, it was announced that Plan B Entertainment was developing a comedy film, Brad's Status, written and directed by Mike White, in which Ben Stiller would star. On October 31, 2016, Amazon Studios came aboard to co-finance and distribute the film. Michael Sheen, Luke Wilson, Jenna Fischer, and Austin Abrams joined Stiller in the cast.

Principal photography on the film began in October 2016 in Montreal.

== Release and reception ==
In May 2017, it was announced that Amazon Studios and Annapurna Pictures, who produced another Amazon-released film, Wiener-Dog, would co-distribute the film on September 15, 2017.

=== Critical response ===
On review aggregator website Rotten Tomatoes, the film has an approval rating of 79% based on 175 reviews, with an average rating of 6.8/10. The site's critical consensus reads, "Brad's Status transcends its familiar premise with insightful observations and affecting interplay between stars Ben Stiller and Austin Abrams." On Metacritic, another review aggregator, the film has a weighted average score of 71 out of 100, based on 40 critics, indicating "generally favorable" reviews. Furthermore, Brad's Status has attracted attention for its existentialist perspective.

=== Accolades ===
Award	Date of ceremony	Category	Recipient(s) and nominee(s)	Result	Ref.
Gotham Independent Film Awards	November 27, 2017	Best Screenplay	Mike White	Nominated	
