= Carla Hacken =

American film producer

- Born: United States
- Occupation: Movie producer
- Known for: Hell Or High Water

Carla Hacken is an American film producer and former studio executive. She is best known for producing the critically acclaimed film Hell or High Water (2016), which earned her an Academy Award for Best Picture nomination alongside Julie Yorn. She is president and founder of her production company, Paper Pictures.

== Awards and nominations ==
- Nominated: Academy Award for Best Picture - Hell or High Water
