= List of awards and nominations received by Frank Langella =

Frank Langella awards and nominations
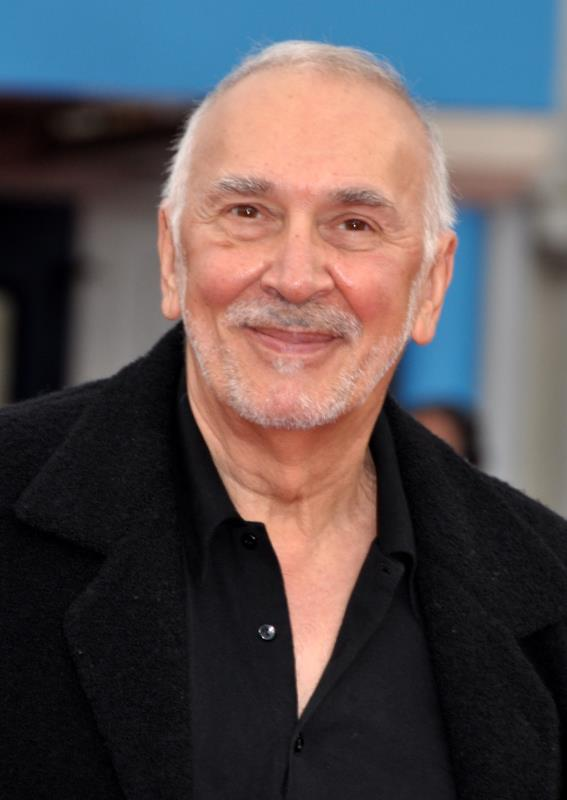
- Langella at the Deauville Film Festival in 2012
Awards and nominations
Award	Wins	Nominations
Academy Awards	0	1
Actor Awards	1	5
British Academy Film Awards	0	1
Primetime Emmy Awards	0	1
Golden Globes	0	2
Tony Awards	4	7

Totals (Note: Certain award groups do not simply award one winner. They acknowledge several different recipients, have runners-up, and have third place. Since this is a specific recognition and is different from losing an award, runner-up mentions are considered wins in this award tally. For simplification and to avoid errors, each award in this list has been presumed to have had a prior nomination.)
- Wins: 5
- Nominations: 15

Frank Langella is an American actor of the stage and screen. Over his career he received four Tony Awards and an Actor Award as well as nominations for an Academy Award, a BAFTA Award, two Golden Globes, and a Primetime Emmy Award.

For his work on stage he received four Tony Awards, his first two for Best Featured Actor in a Play for playing human-sized lizard in Edward Albee's Seascape (1975) and a Russian aristocrat in Ivan Turgenev's Fortune's Fool (2002). He won the later two for Best Actor in a Play for Richard Nixon in Peter Morgan's Frost/Nixon (2008), and a man dealing with alzheimer's in Florian Zeller's The Father (2016). He was Tony-nominated for playing Count Dracula in Dracula (1978), an aging dance choreographer in Match (2004), and a financier in Man and Boy (2012).

Langella reprised his performance as Richard Nixon in Ron Howard's political drama Frost/Nixon (2008) for which he was nominated for the Academy Award, Actor Award, BAFTA Award, and a Golden Globe Award, all for Best Lead Actor. He also has received Actor Award nominations Good Night and Good Luck (2005), Captain Fantastic (2016), and finally winning for Outstanding Ensemble Cast in a Motion Picture for Aaron Sorkin's courtroom drama The Trial of the Chicago 7 (2019).

On television, he was Primetime Emmy Award-nominated for Outstanding Informational Special for I, Leonardo: A Journey of the Mind in 1983.

== Major associations ==
=== Academy Awards ===
Year	Category	Nominated work	Result	Ref.
2008	Best Actor	Frost/Nixon	Nominated	

=== Actor Awards ===
Year	Category	Nominated work	Result	Ref.
2005	Outstanding Performance by a Cast in a Motion Picture	Good Night, and Good Luck	Nominated	
2008	Outstanding Performance by a Male Actor in a Leading Role	Frost/Nixon	Nominated	
2008	Outstanding Performance by a Cast in a Motion Picture	Frost/Nixon	Nominated	
2016	Outstanding Performance by a Cast in a Motion Picture	Captain Fantastic	Nominated	
2020	Outstanding Performance by a Cast in a Motion Picture	The Trial of the Chicago 7	Won	

=== BAFTA Awards ===
Year	Category	Nominated work	Result	Ref.
British Academy Film Awards
2009	Best Leading Actor	Frost/Nixon	Nominated	

=== Emmy Awards ===
Year	Category	Nominated work	Result	Ref.
Primetime Emmy Awards
1983	Outstanding Informational Programming	I, Leonardo: A Journey of the Mind	Nominated	

=== Golden Globe Award ===
Year	Category	Nominated work	Result	Ref.
1971	New Star of the Year – Actor	Diary of a Mad Housewife	Nominated	
2008	Best Actor in a Motion Picture – Drama	Frost/Nixon	Nominated	

=== Laurence Olivier Awards ===
Year	Category	Nominated work	Result	Ref.
2007	Best Actor	Frost/Nixon	Nominated	

=== Tony Awards ===
Year	Category	Nominated work	Result	Ref.
1975	Best Featured Actor in a Play	Seascape	Won	
1978	Best Actor in a Play	Dracula	Nominated	
2002	Best Featured Actor in a Play	Fortune's Fool	Won	
2004	Best Actor in a Play	Match	Nominated	
2007	Best Actor in a Play	Frost/Nixon	Won	
2012	Best Actor in a Play	Man and Boy	Nominated	
2016	Best Actor in a Play	The Father	Won	

== Industry awards ==
Year	Association	Category	Nominated work	Result	Ref.
2020	Capri Hollywood International Film Festival	Capri Italian-American Award	The Trial of the Chicago 7	Won	
2008	Critics' Choice Movie Awards	Best Actor	Frost/Nixon	Nominated	
2016	Critics' Choice Television Awards	Best Supporting Actor in a Limited Series or Movie	All the Way	Nominated	
2005	Gotham Awards	Best Ensemble Performance	Good Night and Good Luck	Nominated	
2008	Independent Spirit Award	Best Male Lead	Starting Out in the Evening	Nominated	
1971	National Board of Review	Best Supporting Actor	Diary of a Mad Housewife / The Twelve Chairs	Won	
2005	National Society of Film Critics	Best Supporting Actor	Good Night and Good Luck	Nominated	
2007	National Society of Film Critics	Best Actor	Starting Out in the Evening	Nominated	
1970	New York Film Critics Circle	Best Supporting Actor	Diary of a Mad Housewife	Nominated	
1979	Saturn Awards	Best Actor	Dracula	Nominated	
2009	Saturn Awards	Best Supporting Actor	The Box	Nominated	

== Theatre awards ==
Year	Association	Category	Nominated work	Result	Ref.
1969	Drama Desk Award	Outstanding Performance	A Cry of Players	Won	
1975	Drama Desk Award	Outstanding Featured Actor in a Play	Seascape	Won	
1978	Drama Desk Award	Outstanding Actor in a Play	Dracula	Nominated	
1996	Drama Desk Award	Outstanding Actor in a Play	The Father	Won	
1997	Drama Desk Award	Outstanding Actor in a Play	Present Laughter	Nominated	
2002	Drama Desk Award	Outstanding Featured Actor in a Play	Fortune's Fool	Won	
2004	Drama Desk Award	Outstanding Actor in a Play	Match	Nominated	
2007	Drama Desk Award	Outstanding Actor in a Play	Frost/Nixon	Won	
2016	Drama Desk Award	Actor in a Play	The Father	Won	
1978	Drama League Awards	Distinguished Performance	Dracula	Won	
1965	Obie Awards	Distinguished Performance	Good Day	Won	
1966	Obie Awards	Distinguished Performance	The White Devil	Won	
1996	Outer Critics Circle Awards	Best Featured in a Play	The Father	Won	
1997	Outer Critics Circle Awards	Best Actor in a Play	Present Laughter	Nominated	
2002	Outer Critics Circle Awards	Best Featured Actor in a Play	Fortune's Fool	Won	
2004	Outer Critics Circle Awards	Best Actor in a Play	Match	Nominated	
2007	Outer Critics Circle Awards	Best Actor in a Play	Frost/Nixon	Won	
2016	Outer Critics Circle Awards	Best Actor in a Play	The Father	Won	
