= Stephen Belber =

American dramatist

- Born: March 22, 1967 (age 59); Washington, D.C., U.S.
- Education: Trinity College, Connecticut (BA); Juilliard School (GrDip)
- Occupations: Playwright, screenwriter, film director
- Spouse: Lucie Tiberghien (married 1997-present)

Stephen Belber (born March 3, 1967) is an American playwright, screenwriter and film director. His plays have been produced on Broadway and in over 50 countries. He directed the film adaptation of his Broadway play Match, starring Patrick Stewart (playing the Tony nominated role created by Frank Langella). He created the Netflix series The Madness, starring Colman Domingo, Marsha Stephanie Blake, and John Ortiz and wrote and directed What We Do Next, starring Michelle Veintimilla, Karen Pittman, and Corey Stoll. He also wrote and directed the film Management, starring Jennifer Aniston, Steve Zahn and Woody Harrelson, and wrote the HBO film O.G., starring Jeffrey Wright, Theothus Carter, and William Fichtner. Belber was an actor and associate writer on The Laramie Project (which later became an HBO film, for which he received an Emmy nomination), as well as a co-writer of The Laramie Project, Ten Years Later.

== Early life ==
Belber was born in Washington, D.C. He studied philosophy at Trinity College in Hartford, Connecticut, graduating in 1989. He attended the Trinity/La MaMa Performing Arts Program following his graduation. He moved to New York in 1992 and held a variety of jobs including waiter, substitute teacher, and wire service operator for the United Nations. His first show in New York was a solo piece titled Psychotic Busboy Blues followed by two more one-man shows, Eclectic Mulatto Moondance and One Million Butterflies. He attended the Playwrights Horizons Theater School and in 1994 he was accepted to the playwriting program at The Juilliard School, where in his second year his full-length play, The Broken Fall, was produced as part of the 4th year repertory.

== Career ==
In 1997 he was the winner of the Fringe NYC Overall Excellence Award in playwriting for Finally, and in 2000 he won the same award for The Death of Frank. Also in 2000, the Actors Theatre of Louisville produced Belber's Tape at the Humana Festival of New American Plays. He then wrote the screenplay for the 2001 film adaptation of Tape, directed by Richard Linklater and starring Ethan Hawke, Uma Thurman, and Robert Sean Leonard. The Naked Angels production of Tape, starring Dominic Fumusa, Josh Stamberg and Alison West, had earlier played in New York, London and Los Angeles.

Belber's next major project in 2001 came from working with the Tectonic Theatre Project. There he researched, was an associate writer, and acted in The Laramie Project, a play and later a film written in response to Matthew Shepard's fatal beating in Laramie, Wyoming. The subsequent movie starred Laura Linney, Steve Buscemi, Ben Foster, Christina Ricci and Peter Fonda. Belber received an Emmy nomination for his work as a writer on the film.

In 2002 and 2003, Belber wrote for the US TV series Law & Order: Special Victims Unit. He also wrote for the Denis Leary show Rescue Me.

Belber's Broadway debut came in 2004 with his play Match starring Frank Langella, Ray Liotta, and Jane Adams, garnering Langella a Tony nomination. The play has since been produced in France, Switzerland, Germany, Israel, Bosnia, and elsewhere.

In 2005, his play McReele was produced by New York's Roundabout Theater, starring Anthony Mackie.

His play Carol Mulroney premiered in 2005 at Boston's Huntington Theater, directed by Lisa Peterson.

In 2006, his play A Small Melodramatic Story was produced by The Labyrinth Theater Company (at the Public Theater), starring Isiah Whitlock Jr. and Quincy Bernsteine.

In 2008 his play Fault Lines was produced by Naked Angels at The Cherry Lane Theater in New York, directed by David Schwimmer and starring Josh Lucas, Noah Emmerich, Jennifer Mudge and Dominic Fumusa.

Also in 2008, his play Geometry of Fire was produced by Rattlestick Theater in New York, starring Jennifer Mudge, Jeffrey Demunn and Kevin O’Donnell, and directed by Lucie Tiberghien.

In 2010, Belber's play Dusk Rings A Bell was produced by New York's Atlantic Theater Company, starring Kate Walsh and Paul Sparks, and directed by Sam Gold.

In 2012, Belber's play Don’t Go Gentle was produced by New York's Manhattan Class Company, starring Michael Cristofer, Jennifer Mudge, Maxx Brawer, David Wilson Barnes and Angela Lewis, and directed by Lucie Tiberghien.

Also in 2012, his play The Power Of Duff received the first of 3 domestic productions, at New York Stage & Film, the first of which starred Greg Kinnear, Jennifer Westfeldt and Dominic Fumusa. (It subsequently went on to productions at The Huntington Theater in Boston and The Geffen Theater in LA.)

In 2014, Belber's play The Muscles In Our Toes was produced by The Labyrinth Theater Company in New York, directed by Annie Kauffman.

Belber's other plays include The Transparency of Val, The Wake, Through Fred, The Death of Frank, Mel and Gene, Drifting Elegant, and Finally. A number of Belber's other plays have been developed through the PlayPenn New Play Conference.

In 2019, Belber's play Joan premiered at Colt Coeur. It was directed by Adrienne Campbell-Holt and starred Johanna Day, Adam Harrington, Marjan Neshat.

=== Film and television ===
Belber's adaptation of his play Tape premiered at the Sundance Film Festival in 2000.

The HBO film of The Laramie Project, on which he was an associate writer, premiered at Sundance in 2002.

His adaptation of his play, Drifting Elegant, directed by Amy Glazer, premiered in 2006 and starred Josh Stamberg and Jennifer Mudge.

Belber wrote and directed the film Management, starring Jennifer Aniston, Steve Zahn and Woody Harrelson, which premiered at the Toronto International Film Festival in 2008.

He wrote and directed Match, starring Patrick Stewart, Matthew Lillard and Carla Gugino, which premiered at the Tribeca Film Festival in 2014.

Belber wrote the 2018 HBO film O.G., starring Jeffrey Wright, Theothus Carter, and William Fichtner, and directed by Madeleine Sackler.

Belber was a writer and consulting producer for the CBS TV show Tommy, starring Edie Falco.

Belber has written TV pilots for HBO, F/X, Fox Television Studios and The History Channel. In film he has sold spec scripts to Sony, Universal and Paramount, and done numerous polishes and rewrites (including uncredited work on Dallas Buyer’s Club).

Belber wrote and directed the 2022 film What We Do Next, starring Michelle Veintimilla, Karen Pittman, and Corey Stoll.

Belber created the 2024 Netflix television series, The Madness, starring Colman Domingo, Marsha Stephanie Blake, and John Ortiz.

== Selected credits ==
=== As writer ===
==== Theatre ====
- Tape (2000)
- The Laramie Project (2000)
- Match (2004)
- McReele (2005)
- Carol Mulroney (2005)
- A Small Melodramatic Story (2006)
- Drifting Elegant (2006)
- Fault Lines (2008)
- The Geometry of Fire (2009)
- The Laramie Project: Ten Years Later (2009)
- Dusk Rings a Bell (2010)
- Don't Go Gentle (2012)
- The Power of Duff (2012)
- The Muscles In Our Toes (2014)
- Joan (2019)

==== Film ====
- Tape (2001)
- The Laramie Project (2002)
- O.G. (2018)

==== Television ====
- Law & Order: Special Victims Unit (2002–2003)
- Rescue Me (2004)
- Tommy (2020)
- The Madness (2024)

=== As writer and director ===
- Management (2008)
- Match (2014)
- What We Do Next (2022)
