= What You Wish For =

2023 film by Nicholas Tomnay

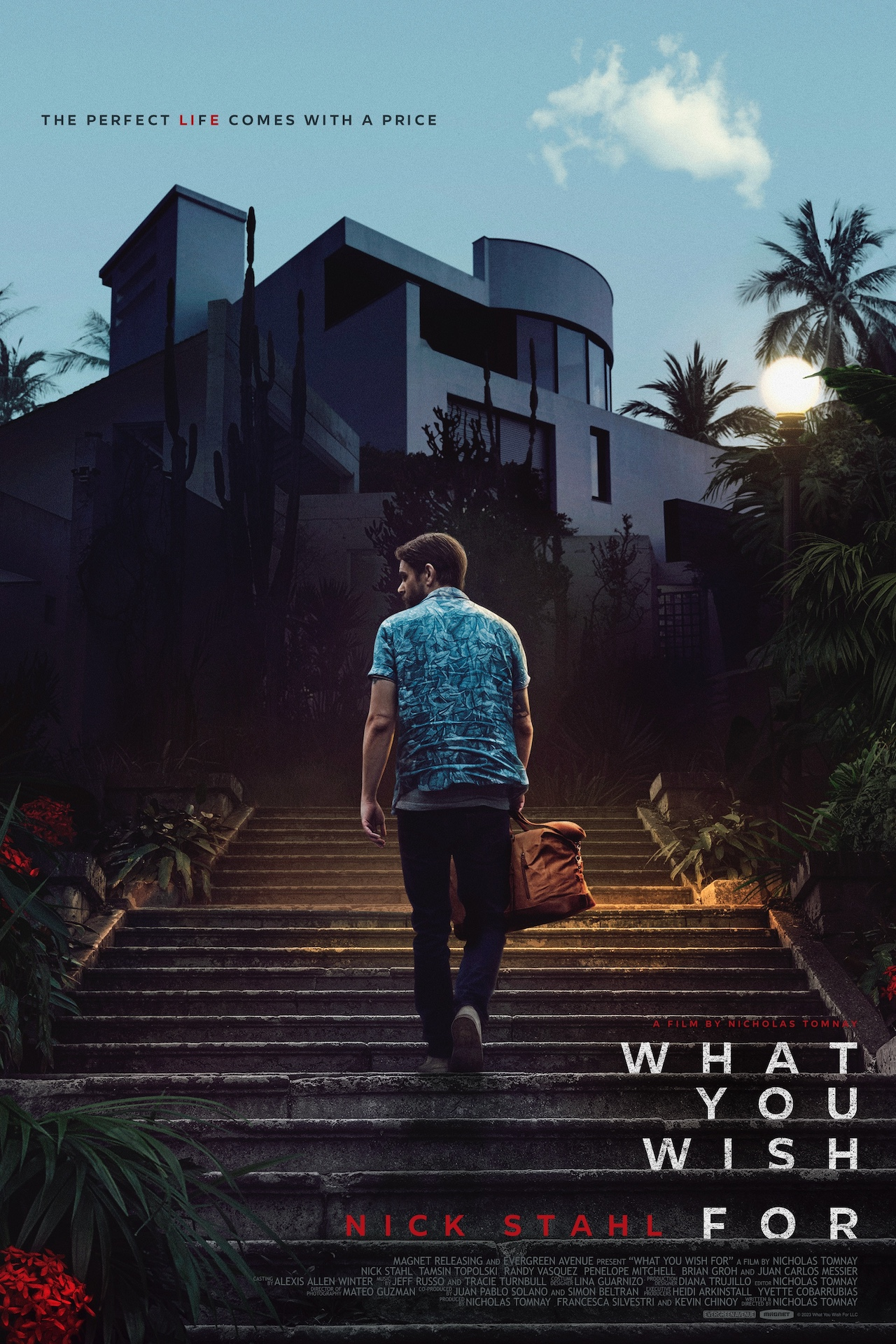
- Theatrical release poster
- Directed by: Nicholas Tomnay
- Written by: Nicholas Tomnay
- Produced by: Nicholas Tomnay; Francesca Silvestri; Kevin Chinoy
- Starring: Nick Stahl; Tamsin Topolski; Randy Vasquez; Penelope Mitchell
- Cinematography: Mateo Guzmán
- Edited by: Nicholas Tomnay
- Music by: Jeff Russo; Tracie Turnbull
- Production companies: Evergreen Avenue; Jaguar Bite; Freestyle Picture Company
- Distributed by: Magnet Releasing
- Release dates: 30 July 2023 (Fantasia); 31 May 2024 (United States)
- Running time: 101 minutes
- Country: United States
- Languages: English; Spanish
- Box office: $6,279

What You Wish For is a 2023 American thriller film written and directed by Nicholas Tomnay, and starring Nick Stahl, Tamsin Topolski, Randy Vasquez, and Penelope Mitchell.

What You Wish For premiered at the 2023 Fantasia International Film Festival. The film was released in selected cinemas in the United States on 31 May 2024 by Magnet Releasing. It received generally positive reviews from critics.

== Plot ==
Ryan, a talented yet struggling chef burdened by gambling debts, escapes to Colombia to seek refuge with his friend and former culinary school roommate, Jack. The two reconnect and befriend a tourist named Alice. Back at Jack's upscale house, they host a cooking competition judged by Alice, who declares Ryan the winner. Alice ends up sleeping with Jack, while Ryan receives menacing texts from the gambling syndicate threatening his mother if he does not repay his debts.

The next evening, Jack confides in Ryan about the overwhelming pressures of his job. By morning, Ryan is horrified to discover that Jack has hanged himself, likely consumed by work pressure and remorse. Ryan sees his suicide as an opportunity to escape from his own financial difficulties. He assumes Jack's identity, hides his body in a nearby river, accesses his computer, and attempts to transfer all the money in Jack's UK bank account to his own. However, the bank asks Ryan to visit with a photo ID to enable the transfer. So, Ryan contacts a Chinese website for a fake driver's license that has Jack's personal details but Ryan's photo.

While waiting for the fake ID to be processed and facing escalating threats from the gambling syndicate, Jack's boss Imogen arrives and mistakes Ryan for Jack. She enlists him to prepare for an exclusive dinner party. Ryan learns that the company pays Jack handsomely. He persuades Imogen to pay a partial amount in advance and uses the funds to settle his gambling debts and protect his mother. However, he learns that Jack had been cooking for a sinister underground organisation that serves human flesh to wealthy clientele. Horrified, Ryan finds himself coerced into participating. The company's enforcer Maurice "sources" a local man, José, as the next "ingredient". Unbeknownst to them, José's uncle Ruiz is a police detective who arrives at the villa to investigate his nephew's disappearance. Invited by one of the guests, the detective unknowingly dines on José's flesh during the event.

During the dinner, Alice appears, searching for Jack. She is shocked to see Ryan impersonating Jack. For the final dish, Ryan is tasked with preparing tongue sashimi but discovers the provided tongue is infected with herpes. Forced to improvise, the group kills Alice and her tongue is harvested for the dish.

When Ryan learns that leaving the company means becoming the next "ingredient", he slips a note to Ruiz asking for a meeting in the restroom, where he confesses everything to Ruiz. The detective is killed after the guests leave, and his and Alice's flesh are saved for future dinners. To cover their tracks, Imogen sends a fabricated email to the detective's sister, claiming José had eloped to Bogotá.

The following day, Imogen tags Ryan with a microchip implant to prevent his escape and sends him to Africa for another event. Later, at the airport en route to London, Ryan appears resigned to his fate. Introducing himself as "Jack" to a fellow traveller at the bar, he accepts his new identity and life within the company.

== Cast ==
- Nick Stahl as Ryan
- Tamsin Topolski as Imogen
- Randy Vasquez as Detective Ruiz
- Penelope Mitchell as Alice
- Brian Groh as Jack
- Juan Carlos Messier as Maurice

== Production ==
What You Wish For is a feature film written and directed by Nicholas Tomnay, following his 2010 debut The Perfect Host. The film was produced by Evergreen Avenue, a company co-founded by Tomnay, alongside producers Kevin Chinoy and Francesca Silvestri of Freestyle Picture Company, in association with Jaguar Bite, a production services company based in Bogotá, Colombia.

According to Tomnay, the screenplay for What You Wish For was selected from a number of projects he had developed after The Perfect Host, in part due to its feasibility as a lower-budget production.

Principal photography took place in Colombia in 2021, with filming occurring south of Bogotá during the COVID-19 pandemic. The production was supported by Freestyle Picture Company and local production services. The film is set in an unspecified Latin American location, a choice Tomnay has said was intended to emphasize the story’s thematic elements.

Tomnay has cited influences on the film including The Talented Mr. Ripley, Rope, and The Servant.

== Release ==
What You Wish For premiered at the Fantasia International Film Festival on 30 July 2023. The film played in several other festivals, including FrightFest, Fantastic Fest, and Screamfest. In January 2024, Magnet Releasing acquired the United States distribution rights to the film.

What You Wish For was released in selected theatres and on digital in the United States by Magnet Releasing on 31 May 2024.

== Reception ==
=== Box office ===
What You Wish For grossed $2,587 from 16 cinemas during its opening weekend in the United States.

=== Critical response ===
On the review aggregator website Rotten Tomatoes, 81% of 37 critics' reviews are positive, with an average rating of 7.3/10. Metacritic, which uses a weighted average, assigned the film a score of 66 out of 100, based on 7 critics, indicating "generally favorable" reviews.

Mary Beth McAndrews from Dread Central wrote in her upbeat review: "What You Wish For is a delightfully skeezy thriller about desperation and searching for that one life-changing meal".

Glenn Kenny gave the film a positive review and compared its emotional impact to:

...Hitchcock's Psycho in which Norman Bates is dumping Marion Crane's car, with her dead body in the trunk, into the swamp behind the Bates Motel. It sinks steadily for a while, then stalls, and we gasp. And we wonder, why are we gasping?

Kyle Smith of The Wall Street Journal was also positive: "The pleasure it brings is comfortingly old-fashioned". Michael Talbot-Haynes at Film Threat gave the film an 8/10 rating: "What You Wish For is everything you could wish for in a well-lit plunge into the abyss."

Courtney Howard of Variety was less enthusiastic about the film, stating that "the obvious Aesop's Fables-inspired lessons make what could've been an extraordinary meal into something far less memorable".

Fred Topel of United Press International also gave the film a negative review and wrote, "Plays like the B-movie knockoff of last year's The Menu. While Wish would have been in the works before The Menu premiered, a side-by-side comparison shows what the bigger studio version got so right."

== See also ==
- Fresh (2022 film)
- Delicious (2025 film)
