= Lies We Tell (2017 film) =

- Film poster
- Directed by: Mitu Misra
- Screenplay by: Ewen Glass; Andy McDermott
- Story by: Mitu Misra
- Produced by: Danny Gulliver; Andy McDermott; Malcolm Scott
- Starring: Gabriel Byrne; Sibylla Deen; Harvey Keitel
- Cinematography: Santosh Sivan
- Edited by: Chris Gill
- Music by: Zbigniew Preisner
- Release date: September 21, 2017 (Raindance)
- Running time: 109 minutes
- Country: United Kingdom
- Language: English

Lies We Tell is a 2017 British crime thriller film directed by Mitu Misra and starring Gabriel Byrne, Sibylla Deen and Harvey Keitel. It is Misra's directorial debut.

== Plot ==
A trusted driver must deal with his dead boss' Muslim mistress, her dark past pulling him into a life-and-death showdown with her notorious gangster cousin/ex-husband.

== Cast ==
- Gabriel Byrne as Donald
- Harvey Keitel as Demi
- Mark Addy as Billy
- Sibylla Deen as Amber
- Jan Uddin as K.D.
- Reece Ritchie as Nathan
- Emily Atack as Tracey
- Danica Johnson as Miriam
- Gina McKee as Heather
- Sammy Winward as Cheryl

== Reception ==
As of June 2020, Lies We Tell holds a 0% approval rating on Rotten Tomatoes, based on 16 reviews with an average rating of 3.75/10. Glenn Kenny of RogerEbert.com awarded the film two stars. Nick De Semlyen of Empire awarded the film two stars out of five.
