= Match (film) =

- Theatrical release poster
- Directed by: Stephen Belber
- Written by: Stephen Belber
- Produced by: David Permut; Matt Ratner; Rick Rosenthal
- Starring: Patrick Stewart; Carla Gugino; Matthew Lillard
- Cinematography: Luke Geissbühler
- Edited by: Madeleine Gavin
- Production companies: Permut Presentations; Sentinel Pictures; Tilted Windmill Productions; Whitewater Films
- Distributed by: IFC Films
- Release dates: April 18, 2014 (Tribeca Film Festival); January 14, 2015 (United States)
- Running time: 92 minutes
- Country: United States
- Language: English
- Box office: $37,285

Match is a 2014 American drama film written and directed by Stephen Belber, based on his 2004 play of the same name. The film stars Patrick Stewart, Carla Gugino and Matthew Lillard. The film was released on 14 January 2015, by IFC Films.

== Plot ==
The film revolves around Tobi, a middle-aged ex-dancer now working as a ballet instructor at the Juilliard School in New York City. He is asked for an interview by husband and wife Mike and Lisa, who claim Lisa is preparing a dissertation on the dance community of the 1960s. Through the course of the interview, Mike's questions keep getting more and more personal. He finally reveals that he suspects that Tobi is his biological father, as indicated by Mike's mother on her deathbed. When Tobi denies this, Mike forcefully takes a DNA sample from Tobi and rushes to a police lab, where his friend Jim performs a DNA test.

Outraged by Mike's violence, Lisa stays to clean up the mess Mike made. She bonds with Tobi as a person and Tobi reveals that he knows he is Mike's father, but denied it out of shame. He declined to raise the newborn boy, abandoning Mike in favor of his dancing career. The mother then asked that he never talk to them again. He also reveals that he paid a part of Mike's college tuition. Tobi framed the pregnancy and decision to raise the child anyway as a choice the mother made; Mike explained that the mother was not raised to see abortion as a choice.

When Mike returns to take Lisa home, the three have an argument. Tobi tells Mike to treat his wife well. After further intense argument, in which Mike graphically tells Tobi he chose to make his life so that no one loves him, the pair leave. Lisa convinces Tobi to tell Mike the truth and Tobi invites the pair for brunch the next day.

On their way to Tobi's house the next morning, Mike is called by Jim, who tells him that the DNA was not a match. When Lisa and Mike tell Tobi this, he has an anxiety attack, and politely asks them to let him be alone. As the movie ends, Tobi is heard calling friends to take them up on an offer of a dinner party.

== Cast ==
- Patrick Stewart as Tobi Powell
- Carla Gugino as Lisa
- Matthew Lillard as Mike
- Maduka Steady as Cabbie
- Jaime Tirelli as Raul
- Rob Yang as Jim

== Production ==
On 17 January 2013, Patrick Stewart, Carla Gugino, and Matthew Lillard joined the cast.

== Release ==
The film premiered at the Tribeca Film Festival on 18 April 2014. The film was released theatrically on 14 January 2015, by IFC Films.

== Reception ==
Match received positive reviews from critics. On Rotten Tomatoes, the film has a rating of 76%, based on 38 reviews, with an average rating of 6.6/10. On Metacritic, the film has a rating of 62 out of 100, based on 17 critics, indicating "generally favorable reviews". In a review on RogerEbert.com Glenn Kenny said, "This is hardly a world-shaker of a movie but it is a well-constructed and thoughtful character study brought to vivid life by its players."
