= The I-Land =

American science fiction thriller streaming television miniseries

- Genre: Science fiction; Thriller
- Created by: Anthony Salter
- Starring: Natalie Martinez; Kate Bosworth; Ronald Peet; Kyle Schmid; Sibylla Deen; Gilles Geary; Anthony Lee Medina; Kota Eberhardt; Michelle Veintimilla; Alex Pettyfer
- Composer: Emily Rice
- Country of origin: United States
- Original language: English
- No. of episodes: 7

Production
- Executive producers: Neil LaBute; Chad Oakes; Michael Frislev
- Producers: Petros Danabassis; Kate Bosworth; Natalie Martinez; Morris Chapdelaine
- Cinematography: Walt Lloyd
- Editors: Joel Plotch; Lara Mazur; Bridget Durnford
- Camera setup: Single-camera
- Running time: 37–43 minutes
- Production companies: Contemptible Entertainment; Nomadic Pictures

Original release
- Network: Netflix
- Release: September 12, 2019

The I-Land is an American science fiction thriller television miniseries created by Anthony Salter. The series is executive produced by Neil LaBute, Chad Oakes and Mike Frislev. The series stars Kate Bosworth, Natalie Martinez, Ronald Peet, Kyle Schmid, Gilles Geary, Sibylla Deen, Anthony Lee Medina, Kota Eberhardt, Michelle Veintimilla and Alex Pettyfer. It was released on September 12, 2019 on Netflix. The series received overwhelmingly negative reviews from critics.

== Synopsis ==
Ten people wake up on the beach of what appears to be a deserted tropical island. None of them have any memory of who they are or how they got there, and each takes on the name that is printed on their clothes tags. The group make initial attempts to band together, but differing priorities and strong personalities cause some of them to clash. In particular, Chase, who wants to investigate the island, does not get along with KC, who is suspicious of Chase's ability to find resources, and Brody, who attempts to rape Chase.

When Brody is murdered, the group assumes Chase is responsible and knocks her unconscious. Chase wakes up in a futuristic Texas correctional prison facility, where she learns that she and the other nine people are violent crime prisoners, and are part of a "rehabilitation simulation". Their minds have been put in the computer simulation of the island to test if they will resume old behavioral patterns. Anyone who dies in the simulation dies in real life. Chase is returned to the island simulation, where the avatars of two prison marshals arrive to deliberately cause the group to fight and split up. Additionally, the prisoners' memories start to return, which causes further friction and confusion.

== Cast and characters ==
=== Main ===
- Natalie Martinez as Gabriela Chase, a military veteran imprisoned for her mother's murder. While on the I-Land, she was made to believe she murdered her mother. She discovers that she is married to Cooper. After Cooper admits to framing Chase for the murder of her mother, she is released from the I-Land program and is taken off death row.
- Kate Bosworth as KC, a formerly abused wife and waitress imprisoned for murdering her two sons. She was flirted with as a waitress and had an affair with a man from Chicago. After learning this, she was drowned and almost killed in her kitchen sink by her abusive husband when she told him she did not love him. He releases her from being drowned and tells her she can have her divorce but she will never see her sons again. She then drugs her two young sons using cough medicine and drove into the ocean to drown them. She later attempted suicide by stabbing herself in the stomach in front of her husband.
- Ronald Peet as Cooper, a disfigured former military commander who became a farmer. He is married to Chase. He accidentally killed his mother in-law during a struggle. He stages this to look like a break in but they both are arrested for the crime. In a flashback to this memory he accidentally shoots Moses in the stomach, killing him.
- Kyle Schmid as Moses, a former rights extremist who planned to make a statement by causing a gas pipeline explosion, but was arrested after he accidentally killed several workers touring the pipeline site. In the I-Land program, he got shot in the stomach by Cooper.
- Sibylla Deen as Blair, a former nurse who practiced euthanasia, killing many of her patients by injecting potassium chloride into her patients' IV bags. While in the I-Land program, she shoots Donovan with a flare gun after he strangles Mason.
- Gilles Geary as Mason, the gunman in a mass shooting at a supermarket. He planned on shooting himself after, but couldn't muster the strength to do it. Instead he was apprehended and put on death row. On the I-Land he is strangled to death by Donovan.
- Anthony Lee Medina as Donovan, a dangerously obsessive man who killed a former coworker after being rejected. In the I-Land program, after Blair rejects his advances and proposal of marriage, he strangles Mason after believing they were a couple. He is later shot and killed by Blair with a flare gun after proposing yet again.
- Kota Eberhardt as Taylor, a former bank robber with an easily manipulative nature. She attempts to escape I-Land and finds II-Land, an island inhabited by a cannibal. Bonnie and Clyde find her on the new island and leave her to die with the cannibal. She discovers that the chicken soup that had been left for her to eat was made of her fingers.
- Michelle Veintimilla as Hayden, a former murderer of sex offenders of men who hurt women. She was killed by Clyde for murdering Brody.
- Alex Pettyfer as Brody, an incarcerated sex offender. He sexually violates and attempts to rape Chase and KC during his time in the I-Land program. He was stabbed and killed by Hayden after she believed he was the cause of dissension in the group.

=== Recurring ===
- Clara Wong as Bonnie, who gets stabbed in the throat by Chase during a struggle while she and Clyde try to kill Cooper.
- KeiLyn Durrel Jones as Clyde, who stabs Chase in the stomach during a struggle while he and Bonnie try to kill Cooper.
- Bruce McGill as Warden Wells, the corrupt and powerful cowboy-style prison warden who tries to sabotage the I-Land program through Bonnie and Clyde. After he is found out and fired as warden, he gets sent to the I-Land program as one of the participants to redeem himself.
- María Conchita Alonso as Mrs. Chase, Gabriela Chase's mother, accidentally shot in the head by Cooper during a struggle.
- Subhash Mandal as Dr. Conrad, the prison doctor who appears to be sympathetic to the main characters and their situation.
- Margaret Colin as Dr. Stevenson, one of the original neural architects of the I-Land and a member of the rehabilitation advisory board.

== Production ==
=== Development ===
On September 28, 2018, it was announced that Netflix had given the production a series order for seven episodes. Neil LaBute was set to serve as co-director, writer and showrunner for the miniseries along with directorial credits from Jonathan Scarfe and writing credits from Lucy Teitler. Executive producers were expected to include LaBute, Chad Oakes, and Mike Frislev with Lucy Teitler and Jonathan Scarfe serving as co-executive producers and Kate Bosworth acting as a producer. Production companies involved with the miniseries were slated to consist of Nomadic Pictures Entertainment. The production company reportedly spent a budget of $14 million for the series, averaging out as $2 million per episode. On August 20, 2019, it was reported that the miniseries was set to be released on September 12, 2019.

=== Casting ===
Alongside the series order announcement, it was confirmed that Kate Bosworth, Natalie Martinez, and Alex Pettyfer would star in the miniseries. In October 2018, it was announced that Kyle Schmid had been cast in a starring role. In December 2018, it was reported that Clara Wong had joined the cast in a recurring capacity. In August 2019, Gilles Geary joined the main cast. In the same month, it was confirmed that Michelle Veintimilla, Kota Eberhardt, Sibylla Deen, Ronald Peet and Anthony Lee Medina would star in the miniseries.

=== Filming ===
Filming for the miniseries took place in Pinewood Indomina Studios, Dominican Republic, San Pedro De Macoris and Las Terrenas, Samaná, Dominican Republic from October 15, 2018 to December 19, 2018.

== Episodes ==
No.	Title	Directed by	Written by	Original release date
1	"Brave New World"	Neil LaBute	Neil LaBute	September 12, 2019
Ten people wake up on an island with one item either buried in the sand or on the beach next to them, including a conch shell, a knife, and a compass. The group realize they have no memory of anything before waking up on the island. Several of them swim in the ocean until a shark severely injures Donovan and he disappears. Meanwhile, Brody and Chase find a waterfall, where they kiss. When Brody wants to have sex and Chase declines, Brody forces himself on her. Chases manages to escape. Back at their camp, Brody denies trying to rape her. Chase finds Donovan, who is still alive but unresponsive. After Mason and Hayden start counting steps between bodies, all equaling 39, they find a sign that states, "FIND YOUR WAY BACK." Chase thinks it's a clue as to why they are on the island, but most of the group dismisses her and they head back to camp. Chase breaks her conch shell.
2	"The Gorgeous Palaces"	Jonathan Scarfe	Neil LaBute	September 12, 2019
Chase discovers an orange raft containing two boxes (one holds first aid items and the other is locked), a backpack containing objects connected to the number 39, a paddle, and gun ammunition. She buries the two boxes, and hides the raft and the paddle, but keeps the backpack. Cooper notices Chase's new backpack, so she tells him about the raft but asks him to keep it a secret. A large rainstorm heads toward the island, and the group does not have shelter. Brody and Cooper fight about how to handle the storm. Brody threatens Cooper with a knife, but Brody eventually leaves and goes to the waterfall alone. The rest of the group heads toward the raft. Chase and Cooper go adventuring and find an abandoned resort. They head back and tell the others, but start bickering. After Brody's dead body is discovered on the beach, Chase gets beaten by the group. She wakes up in an infirmary.
3	"The Insubstantial Pageant"	Jonathan Scarfe	Neil LaBute	September 12, 2019
A nurse reassures a panicked, recently awoken Chase. She is in a prison and learns from Warden Wells that the I-Land is a rehabilitation simulation meant to give prisoners a second chance. When she's told that she will be sent back, Chase tries to escape, but is knocked out and placed in an isolation cell. She experiences flashbacks from her former life. A medical board informs Chase that she is part of a nature versus nurture experiment, in which her memories were erased. Wells reveals that when people die on the I-Land, they die in real life. Chase experiences more flashbacks, which suggest she committed murder in real life. She meets a psychiatrist who is sympathetic to her. While being transported back to the I-Land facility, Chase escapes and discovers the comatose bodies of the other I-Land participants in a laboratory. She is caught and drugged, while Wells reveals he does not want the experiment to work.
4	"Many Goodly Creatures"	Jonathan Scarfe	Neil LaBute	September 12, 2019
Chase wakes up on the island and informs the other prisoners that this is a simulation, but she is dismissed. The group is approached by two strangers: Bonnie and Clyde (a reference to famous criminals of the same name). The duo reveal that Hayden was the one who murdered Brody, as Clyde kills her. Clyde explains that he and Bonnie exert the island's revenge. They also reveal Chase's hidden raft. Chase grabs the gun from the case, turns over the rest of the raft's items, and flees inland. As Bonnie and Clyde leave the group, they suggest the prisoners head for a village on the other side of the island. K.C., Cooper and Moses search for the village, where they find a group of thatched huts on a small beach. The islanders have visions of their past lives, which leads to rifts in the group. Chase returns to the abandoned hotel, where she hallucinates her mother covered in blood. The hallucination claims that Chase killed her. Finding a key, Chase unlocks a door and is stunned by what she finds.
5	"The Cloud Capp'd Towers"	Darnell Martin	Lucy Teitler	September 12, 2019
Taylor tries to leave the island using the raft, despite Bonnie and Clyde telling the group to not attempt this. One of K.C.'s flashbacks reveals that she is married with two kids, and her real name is Mary. In the abandoned hotel, Chase discovers information that may help with escaping the prison. One of the images is of her and Cooper together as a couple. Having wrecked the raft, Taylor returns to the mainland. She finds a sign that reads "Chicken Soup" next to a bowl of soup, which she devours. Meanwhile, Donovan and Blair reflect on the beauty of the island, and he proposes to her. In Donovan's past, he strangles a woman to death in a washroom. After overhearing Bonnie and Clyde discussing the "game rules" as directed by their "boss," Cooper finds Chase. She shows him the images of them together, and they wonder what this means. Bonnie and Clyde approach Taylor and claim that one of the people on the island is a cannibal, and that the chicken soup Taylor ate was not chicken at all, but actually her own fingers.
6	"The Great Globe Itself"	Darnell Martin	Lucy Teitler	September 12, 2019
K.C. has a hallucination of her son, whom she misses deeply. K.C. is comforted by Moses, and the two grow closer. Blair asks Mason not to leave her alone with Donovan, of whom she is skeptical. Mason later fights with Donovan, and Mason is killed. Blair shoots Donovan in the torso with a flare gun. K.C. and Moses, now at the abandoned hotel, try to find answers as they question Chase and Cooper. In an attempt to protect Chase, Cooper pulls the gun from his waistband and points it at K.C. and Moses. In a flashback, Cooper kills Chase's mother in self-defense. In the present, Cooper shoots Moses. Bonnie and Clyde rush into the hotel to exact the island's revenge. Chase fights alongside Cooper and kills Bonnie in the process. Clyde and Bonnie glitch, disappearing from the simulation. The injured Chase crawls out of the hotel, and passes out on the beach. She awakens in prison again.
7	"The Dark Backward"	Jonathan Scarfe	Lucy Teitler	September 12, 2019
Chase is being released from prison, as she was found innocent of murder during the simulation. She is threatened with a life of hardships unless she agrees to not reveal any damning information about Warden Wells. She bargains for Cooper to be released if she follows Wells' instructions. During interviews with the panel, Chase is questioned about her experiences on the island. Bonnie and Clyde are revealed to be marshals who covertly worked for Wells to sabotage the I-Land program. The simulation was hacked to introduce dangerous items, like the handgun, and allow Bonnie and Clyde to navigate the island undetected. During a break with the panel, Wells and a nurse are caught trying to inject Chase with a lethal substance. While being processed through the last phase of prison release, Chase is revealed to be much older than she previously appeared, having served 25 years in prison before the I-Land experiment took place. Chase is told that she played a vital role in the I-Land experiment, which will allow people to absolve themselves of their crimes. Chase exits the prison towards a futuristic Houston, as Wells awakes on the island under the watch of K.C. and Cooper.

== Release ==
On August 20, 2019, the teaser trailer for the miniseries was released. On August 29, 2019, the official trailer for the miniseries was released.

== Reception ==
The review aggregator website Rotten Tomatoes reported an 8% approval rating with an average rating of 3/10, based on 12 reviews. The site's critical consensus reads, "Bafflingly bad, the only mystery is how The I-Land got made in the first place." Metacritic, which uses a weighted average, assigned the film a score of 7 out of 100, based on 4 critics, indicating "overwhelming dislike".

Tim Surette, writing for TV Guide, gave the miniseries a rating of 0.5/5, summarizing that it "is an astonishingly dumb seven-episode mystery-box limited series about 10 people who wake up on a deserted tropical island with no memory of who they are or how they got there. But that central conceit is quickly resolved by Episode 3, as The I-Land spins out of control, rolls over, and wraps itself around an entirely new and equally stupid story."

Writing for The Hollywood Reporter, Daniel Fienberg compared the miniseries to the series Lost "only with a fundamental misunderstanding of how Lost handled character development, mythology, flashback structure, theme and ensemble-building." He also wrote that "no aspect of The I-Land works, and every bad aspect builds on the bad aspects before in a way that makes it pretty clear that nobody involved could have been under any misapprehensions about the quality of the endeavor."

At Paste, Allison Keene said "I have watched some truly, truly bad series in my day, but few that went off the rails this hard this fast. But man, what a ride. Cannibals, climate change, rogue simulations, for-profit prisons, a game with no rules and no logic … what an embarrassment of riches. Or just an embarrassment. We’ll go with that last one."

In his "Stream It Or Skip It" review, Joel Keller at Decider stated that the miniseries should be skipped and summarizes that "The I-Land‘s clunky dialogue and generic characters make us care very little about why these ten jerks are on this island. And, yes, they’re all pretty much jerks."

Jack Seale at The Guardian gave the miniseries one out of five stars and summarizes that "This is sci-fi without a vision, a genre piece that doesn’t know how its own genre works. The I-Land is begging to be forgotten."

Writing for RogerEbert.com, Brian Tallerico summarized that "The ‘I’ stands for Idiotic. If you put a group of teenagers in a room and showed them a few episodes of LOST and Westworld before asking them to write their own program, they might come up with The I-Land," and that "It is a bafflingly horrible sci-fi show, the kind of project that leaves your jaw on the floor, not unlike the first time you saw Tommy Wiseau’s The Room."
