= Tut (miniseries) =

- Genre: Historical drama
- Written by: Michael Vickerman; Peter Paige; Bradley Bredeweg
- Directed by: David Von Ancken
- Starring: Ben Kingsley; Avan Jogia; Sibylla Deen; Alexander Siddig; Kylie Bunbury; Peter Gadiot; Iddo Goldberg; Nonso Anozie
- Composer: Jeff Russo
- Countries of origin: United States; Canada; United Kingdom
- No. of episodes: 3

Production
- Executive producers: David Von Ancken; Michael Vickerman; Joel S. Rice; Michael Prupas; Sharon Levy; Jeremy Elice; Angela Mancuso; Greg Gugliotta
- Producers: Guy Jon Louthan; Irene Litinski
- Production location: Morocco
- Cinematography: Christopher LaVasseur
- Editor: Annie Ilkow
- Running time: 270 minutes
- Production company: Muse Entertainment

Original release
- Network: Spike
- Release: July 19 – July 21, 2015

Tut is a Canadian-American miniseries that premiered on American cable network Spike on July 19, 2015. The three-part miniseries is based on the life of Egyptian pharaoh Tutankhamun.

== Development ==
Tut was first announced by Spike in May 2014. The miniseries marks a return by the network towards scripted programming, and in particular, "event" series that cater to a "balanced" audience (in contrast to the remainder of Spike's programming at the time, which has typically skewed towards a male audience). Such event series have also been recently popular among other networks, such as History. Tut is produced by Muse Entertainment, best known for its other miniseries The Kennedys and The Pillars of the Earth.

According to the executive producer/writer, the series combines historical fact with dramatization. The costume designer incorporated both history and fantasy into the clothing.

== Cast ==
=== Main cast ===
- Avan Jogia as Tutankhamun, the young Pharaoh of Egypt
- Ben Kingsley as Ay, the Grand Vizier.
- Nonso Anozie as General Horemheb, Tutankhamun's savvy and power hungry military strategist.
- Sibylla Deen as Ankhesenamun, the calculating and conniving sister-wife of Tutankhamun
- Alexander Siddig as the High Priest of Amun, a major political figure who holds great influence in Tutankhamun's inner sanctum.
- Kylie Bunbury as Suhad, a beautiful and endearing girl of Mitanni descent, who unknowingly saves Tutankhamun's life and develops a strong bond with the Pharaoh.
- Peter Gadiot as Ka, King Tutankhamun's close confidant and seemingly loyal friend.
- Iddo Goldberg as Lagus, an Egyptian soldier who develops a special bond with Tutankhamun.
- Alistair Toovey as Nahkt, Ay's stepson.
- Steve Toussaint as Tushratta, king of the Mitanni.

=== Supporting cast ===
- Kaizer Akhtar as young Tutankhamun.
- Silas Carson as Pharaoh Akhenaten, the father of Tutankhamun and Ankhesenamun.
- Steve Chusak as Paranefer, Akhenaten's servant.
- Alexander Lyras as General Yuya.
- Geoffrey Burton as Dagi, chief physician of the Egyptians.
- Leon Lopez as Seti.
- Daniela Lavender as Herit.
- Ismail Kanater as the Priest of Sobek.
- Raw Leiba as King Artatama II.

== Episodes ==
No.	Title	Directed by	Written by	Original release date	US viewers (millions)
1	"Part One: Power"	David Von Ancken	Michael Vickerman, Peter Paige & Bradley Bredeweg	July 19, 2015	1.7
In 1332 B.C., Egypt is the most powerful nation in the world, but it is plagued by internal strife. In the city of Thebes, Pharaoh Akhenaten has been poisoned by his most trusted servant. His nine year old son, Tutankhamun has to take his place as pharaoh, and so, is thrust into power at an early age. However, after showing mercy on several occasions, and having the Vizier Ay making important decisions for him, the people deem him weak. He is forced to marry his sister Ankhesenamun to keep the bloodline pure as his closest friend Ka lusts for her. Ten years into his reign, teenage Tut finds the country in economic turmoil and crops ruined by drought. He is also determined to gain control of his kingdom after being conspired against by the power-hungry Ay and having been left for dead by General Horemheb during a battle with the Mitanni.
2	"Part Two: Betrayal"	David Von Ancken	Michael Vickerman, Bradley Bredeweg & Peter Paige	July 20, 2015	1.69
After finding Tutankhamun wounded on the battlefield, a beautiful half Mitanni half Egyptian girl, Suhad rescues him from his own people and nurses him back to health. Betrayed by his inner circle, Tut along with the loyal Lagos and Suhad return to Thebes at the moment Ankhesenamun tries to marry the traitorous Ka, but Tut stabs and kills his former friend just as he's about to be crowned the new pharaoh. It is announced by high priest Amun he has "risen from the dead", turning the boy-king into a powerful pharaoh. Tutankhamun must use his new power to deal with a deadly plague spreading through his kingdom all while his enemies continue their plot to conquer Egypt. Also, Tut's friendship with Suhad blossoms into an intimate relationship, which makes Ankhesenamun jealous, especially after both women wind up pregnant. The Queen ultimately loses her child in miscarriage, and tricks Suhad to go into part of the city that is supposed to be burnt with goal of plague's management.
3	"Part Three: Destiny"	David Von Ancken	Story by : Michael Vickerman, Peter Paige & Bradley Bredeweg; Teleplay by : Michael Vickerman	July 21, 2015	1.44
Tutankhamun invites Tushtratta to the palace for a peace offering, but after the Mitanni king declines it, Tut leads his plague-weakened army in a sneak attack through a secret entrance to the enemy's capitol. Meanwhile, as the young pharaoh is away, Amun leads a revolt against him and orders his priests to kill the king so he can save Egypt from the worship of Aten. After knowing about the assassination attempt Suhad is put in danger and Ankhesenamun kills her. During the attack Prince Tis'ata (Tushratta's son) breaks Tut's leg and instead of tending to his injury, Tut returns to Thebes to destroy the last of his enemies. He conspires with General Horemheb, Ay and Nakht to kill Amun during the festival of Ra at the temple. With the love of his life dead by his own sister and infection setting in, Tut's homecoming is filled with sadness. On his deathbed, Tut makes amends with Ay and Ankhesenamun, who both reassure him he will be remembered for all eternity as a powerful ruler. However, Ay sees that Tut is buried in a lesser tomb meant for one who will never be known, thus remaining undiscovered for over 3,000 years.

== Reception ==
The series has garnered mixed reviews, with a score of 46 on review aggregator Metacritic and 37% on review aggregator Rotten Tomatoes. Brian Lowery of Variety writes, "King Tutankhamun left behind a treasure trove of trinkets, but his nickname is all that's really required to serve as the cornerstone for Tut, the miniseries that unearths the Boy King in order to turn his short life into historical melodrama. Featuring Ben Kingsley as Tut's scheming vizier, surrounded by young actors often photographed as if this were a shampoo commercial, there are modest pleasures relating to the various palace intrigues, but only marginal momentum to drag an audience across three nights, provided they know enough about history to realize the title character won't be available for a sequel."

Robert Bianco of USA Today exclaims, "Tut miniseries is overstuffed melodrama." While, Keith Uhlich of The Hollywood Reporter writes, "Spike network's three-night miniseries about the Egyptian boy king Tutankhamun inspires no devotion."
