= The Madness (TV series) =

2024 American action conspiracy thriller television series

- Promotional poster
- Genre: Action; Conspiracy thriller; Crime drama
- Created by: Stephen Belber
- Showrunners: Stephen Belber; V. J. Boyd
- Starring: Colman Domingo; Marsha Stephanie Blake; John Ortiz; Tamsin Topolski; Thaddeus J. Mixson; Gabrielle Graham
- Composer: Philip Klein
- Country of origin: United States
- Original language: English
- No. of episodes: 8

Production
- Executive producers: Stephen Belber; V. J. Boyd; Peter Chernin; Jenno Topping; Kaitlin Dahill; Clément Virgo
- Running time: 43–58 minutes
- Production companies: Sin Video; BelBer Prod.; Chernin Entertainment

Original release
- Network: Netflix
- Release: November 28, 2024

The Madness is an American action conspiracy thriller limited series created by Stephen Belber for Netflix. Colman Domingo stars as a media pundit who must clear his name after he accidentally stumbles upon a murder in the woods. The series premiered on November 28, 2024, with eight episodes.

== Premise ==
Muncie Daniels, a media pundit, must clear his name after he stumbles upon a murder in the Pocono Mountains. To survive, he has to reconnect with his estranged family and lost ideals.

== Cast ==
=== Main ===
- Colman Domingo as Muncie Daniels
- Marsha Stephanie Blake as Elena Daniels
- John Ortiz as Franco Quinones
- Tamsin Topolski as Lucie Snipes
- Thaddeus J. Mixson as Demetrius Daniels
- Gabrielle Graham as Kallie Daniels

=== Recurring ===
- Bradley Whitford as Stu Magnusson
- Alison Wright as Julia Jayne
- Deon Cole as Kwesi
- Stephen McKinley Henderson as Isiah

== Episodes ==
No.	Title	Directed by	Written by	Original release date
1	"Pilot"	Clément Virgo	Stephen Belber	November 28, 2024
2	"Djibouti"	Clément Virgo	Stephen Belber & V. J. Boyd	November 28, 2024
3	"Discord"	Jessica Lowrey	Obehi Janice & Dana Kitchens	November 28, 2024
4	"Radioactive"	Jessica Lowrey	Story by : Maurice Williams; Teleplay by : Maurice Williams & Liz Ellis	November 28, 2024
5	"Icarus"	Quyen Tran	Katie Swain	November 28, 2024
6	"Loco"	Quyen Tran	Felicia Hilario	November 28, 2024
7	"DNA"	Clément Virgo	Story by : Jeanine C. Daniels; Teleplay by : V. J. Boyd & Dana Kitchens	November 28, 2024
8	"No More Madness"	Clément Virgo	Stephen Belber	November 28, 2024

== Production ==
The series was ordered in February 2023 with Colman Domingo set to star. One month later, Marsha Stephanie Blake, Gabrielle Graham, John Ortiz, Tamsin Topolski, and Thaddeus J. Mixson were cast.

== Reception ==
The review aggregator website Rotten Tomatoes reported a 74% approval rating with an average rating of 7/10, based on 23 critic reviews. The website's critics consensus reads, "Colman Domingo's commanding performance smooths over The Madness' occasional descent into political didacticism, making for a mystery worth investigating." Metacritic, which uses a weighted average, assigned a score of 65 out of 100 based on 19 critics, indicating "generally favorable" reviews.
