= What We Do Next =

American drama film

- Directed by: Stephen Belber
- Screenplay by: Stephen Belber
- Produced by: Chris Mangano; Merry-Kay Poe; Max Neace; Lynn Nottage
- Starring: Corey Stoll; Karen Pittman; Michelle Veintimilla
- Cinematography: Garrette Rose
- Edited by: Justin Chan
- Music by: Paul Brill
- Production companies: Unbridled Films; Mangano Movies & Media
- Release date: April 14, 2022 (Cinequest)
- Running time: 77 minutes
- Country: United States
- Language: English

What We Do Next is a 2022 American thriller directed by Stephen Belber and starring Corey Stoll, Karen Pittman and Michelle Veintimilla. It premiered at the Cinequest Film & Creativity Festival in April 2022. It had a limited theatrical release on March 3, 2023.

== Synopsis ==
Mercado (Veintimilla) has served 16 years in prison for killing her abusive father. After her release, a New York City Councilwoman (Pittman) and a corporate attorney (Stoll) are forced to face up to their involvement in the original crime.

== Cast ==
- Michelle Veintimilla as Elsa Mercado
- Corey Stoll as Paul Jenkins
- Karen Pittman as Sandy James

== Production ==
Chris Mangano, Merry-Kay Poe and Max Neace produced the film, which is a co-production between Poe's Unbridled Films and Mangano's Mangano Movies & Media. Lynn Nottage acted as co-producer. Writer and director Stephen Belber was an executive producer along with Brian Tanke, and Matt Bronson.

It was filmed in the autumn of 2020 in Louisville, Kentucky in six and a half shooting days during the COVID-19 pandemic.

== Release ==
Producers Unbridled Films and Mangano Movies & Media are handling distribution for the film which premiered at the Cinequest Film & Creativity Festival in April 2022, and then also played at the Flyover Film Festival in Louisville. Kentucky in July 2022. The film had a Canadian premiere at the Vancouver International Film Festival on September 30, 2022. The film has a limited US cinema release date of 3 March 2023.

== Reception ==
On the review aggregator website Rotten Tomatoes, What We Do Next holds an approval rating of 100% based on 10 reviews with an average rating of 10/10. Following the premiere for the film Randy Myers in The Mercury News described it as “a taut, never harried 77 minutes” and “well acted and thought provoking”. Lapacazo Sandoval in the New York Amsterdam News reflected that the film had clear beginnings as a play and “is basically still a play, just shot on film”. Praise was given to the director of photography, Garrette Rose, production designer, Christelle Matou, and editor Justin Chan for making a film that was “beautiful to look at”.
