= Madly (2016 film) =

International anthology film

- Official poster
- Directed by: Anurag Kashyap; Mia Wasikowska; Sebastián Silva; Sion Sono; Gael García Bernal; Natasha Khan
- Produced by: Nusrat Durrani; Eric Mahoney
- Starring: Radhika Apte; Satyadeep Misra; Adarsh Gourav; Kathryn Beck; Lex Santos; Tamsin Topolski; Mariko Tsutsui; Yuki Sakurai; Ami Tomite; Taro Suwa; Justina Bustos; Pablow Seijo
- Cinematography: Jay Pinak Oza; Stefan Duscio; Shawn Peters; Hajime Kanda; Julian Ledesma; Chloe Thomson
- Edited by: Prerna Saigal; Mat Evans; Sofia Subercaseaux; Junichi Ito; Sebastian Schjaer; Arttu Salmi
- Music by: Karan Kulkarni; Kim Green; Danny Bensi; Susumu Akizuki; Lynn Fainchtein
- Production companies: Viacom Media Networks; Rei Cine; Cowboy Films; Scarlett Pictures; Phantom Films; Diroriro; Nikkatsu Corporation; Django Film
- Release date: 26 April 2016; (Tribeca Film Festival)
- Running time: 98 minutes
- Countries: United States; United Kingdom; India; Australia; Argentina; Japan
- Languages: English; Spanish; Hindi; Japanese

Madly is a 2016 English-language international anthology film. The film, composed of six segments, features casts and crews from countries that include Australia, Chile, India, Japan, Mexico, and the United Kingdom. Madly was conceived and produced by Nusrat Durrani, then general manager of MTV.

== Plot ==
=== "Clean Shaven" ===
Archana is a woman who is forced into a conservative married life. When her husband realizes that she has shaved her pubis, he decides to imprison her as a punishment.

=== "Afterbirth" ===
A mother struggles to recognize her newborn son as a human creature.

=== "Dance Dance Dance" ===
Rio, a young break dancer from the Bronx is rejected by his family after telling them that he is gay. He is forced to leave his parents' house and live on the streets.

=== "Love of Love" ===
Members of a close-knit Japanese clan end up performing an orgy in a sordid sex club.

=== "Love of My Life" ===
Flashbacks evoke the story of a long relationship.

=== "I Do" ===
A young bride has a panic attack shortly before celebrating her wedding. What helps her is an unexpected encounter with a man from her past.

== Segments, directors and cast ==
Clean Shaven by Anurag Kashyap	Afterbirth by Mia Wasikowska	Dance Dance Dance by Sebastián Silva	Love of Love by Sion Sono	The Love of My Life by Gael García Bernal	I Do by Natasha Khan
Radhika Apte as Archana; Satyadeep Mishra as Sudhir; Adarsh Gourav as Allwyn	Kathryn Beck	Lex Santos as Rio; Antonio Stewart as Diami; Marshall Brando as Rio's father	Ami Tomite as Mio; Dai Hasegawa as Shota; Yuki Sakurai as Sayaka; Eita Okuno as Takunya	Justina Bustos; Pablo Seijo	Tamsin Topolski as Nora

== Reception ==
David Ehrlich of Indie Wire said that "The film, like love itself, is inconsistent and hard to define. The film, like love itself, is also hard to resist". Kenji Fushima of Slant Magazine wrote that "Madly broadly tackles the subject of love without, even at its least successful, stooping to the dire, barrel-scraping cultural condescension of Rio, I Love You". Jay Weissberg of Variety opined that "Like most compilation projects, the effort yields an uneven anthology with little thematic glue holding it together, although for the most part, the six shorts could stand alone and overall quality is high". Frank Scheck of The Hollywood Reporter wrote that "Uneven in the way of so many cinematic anthologies, this is a more artistically ambitious collection than most, even if its aspirations aren’t always fulfilled". Patricia Contino of The Upcoming ave the film 3 stars out of 5 andopined that "On the whole Madly is an ambitious project of compelling filmmaking and storytelling – and instead of one worthwhile film, there are several!" TV Guide said of the film: "this compilation resonates as a portrait of how we love today."

== Accolades ==
Year	Award	Category	Awardee	Result
2017	Tribeca Film Festival Award	Best Actress in an International Narrative Feature Film	Radhika Apte	Won
