= Management (film) =

- Promotional film poster
- Directed by: Stephen Belber
- Written by: Stephen Belber
- Produced by: Sidney Kimmel; Wyck Godfrey; Marty Bowen
- Starring: Jennifer Aniston; Steve Zahn; Woody Harrelson; Fred Ward
- Cinematography: Eric Edwards
- Edited by: Kate Sanford
- Music by: Mychael Danna; Rob Simonsen
- Production companies: Image Entertainment; SKE; Echo Films; Temple Hill Entertainment
- Distributed by: Samuel Goldwyn Films
- Release dates: September 7, 2008 (Toronto International Film Festival); May 15, 2009 (United States)
- Running time: 94 minutes
- Country: United States
- Language: English
- Box office: $2.4 million

Management is a 2008 American romantic comedy-drama directed by Stephen Belber and starring Jennifer Aniston and Steve Zahn. It premiered at the 2008 Toronto International Film Festival and received a limited theatrical release on May 15, 2009.

== Plot ==
Mike Flux works at his parents' motel as the night manager. One day he sees Sue, who is staying at the motel for the weekend. Mike develops a crush on her and surprises her at her door with a bottle of wine. Sue doesn't quite know what to make of his approach, shares some wine to be polite, then asks him to leave. Mike returns the next day, trying the same trick with champagne, and this time she allows him to touch her butt momentarily. As Sue heads back home the next day she decides to go back and have sex with Mike in the laundry room.

Mike realizes his feelings for Sue and flies to her home in Baltimore. She's shocked to see him there, but out of courtesy allows him to stay with her until morning when he can go back home. After spending some time together they get to know each other better as friends, and soon after Mike returns home, Sue stays at the motel again. They decide to go out and have fun.

Mike's mother is very sick, and the two stop by her home to see her. She approves of Sue, and tells Mike that he needs to find happiness in his life. Soon after Sue leaves, Mike's mother passes away. He decides to make a change in his life and go after her once again.

Mike learns that Sue has gotten back together with her old boyfriend Jango, a former punk rocker turned successful businessman in Aberdeen, WA. Mike settles into the new town by taking a job at a Chinese restaurant. The son of the owners, Al, befriends him and allows him to stay in the restaurant's basement.

Mike skydives into Sue and Jango's pool to surprise her, but Jango responds by attacking him with an airsoft gun. Feeling bad about what he did, Jango invites Mike and Al over for dinner. Jango knows he has feelings towards Sue and threatens him. Regardless of the threat, Mike, with help from Al, serenades her with a song later that night.

Sue meets up with Mike the next day, informing him that she and Jango are getting married. Sue is pregnant, and she wants to be with someone that's in control of his life. In anger after everything he worked for to be with her, Mike tells her to leave.

After spending four months in a Buddhist monastery, Mike returns to the motel, now being run solely by his father (Fred Ward). After talking about moving on with their lives, Mike's father hands him the deed to the motel. He decides to turn the motel into a homeless shelter, something Sue had mentioned always wanting to do. Mike calls her at home to tell her, but Jango answers the phone. He reveals that Sue has left him and is living with her mother.

Mike makes his way to Sue's in Maryland to ask her for help with the shelter. She's happy to see him and tells him that she had messed up their relationship. Mike tells her he loves her and only wants to take care of her and her baby. The story ends as they embrace.

== Cast ==
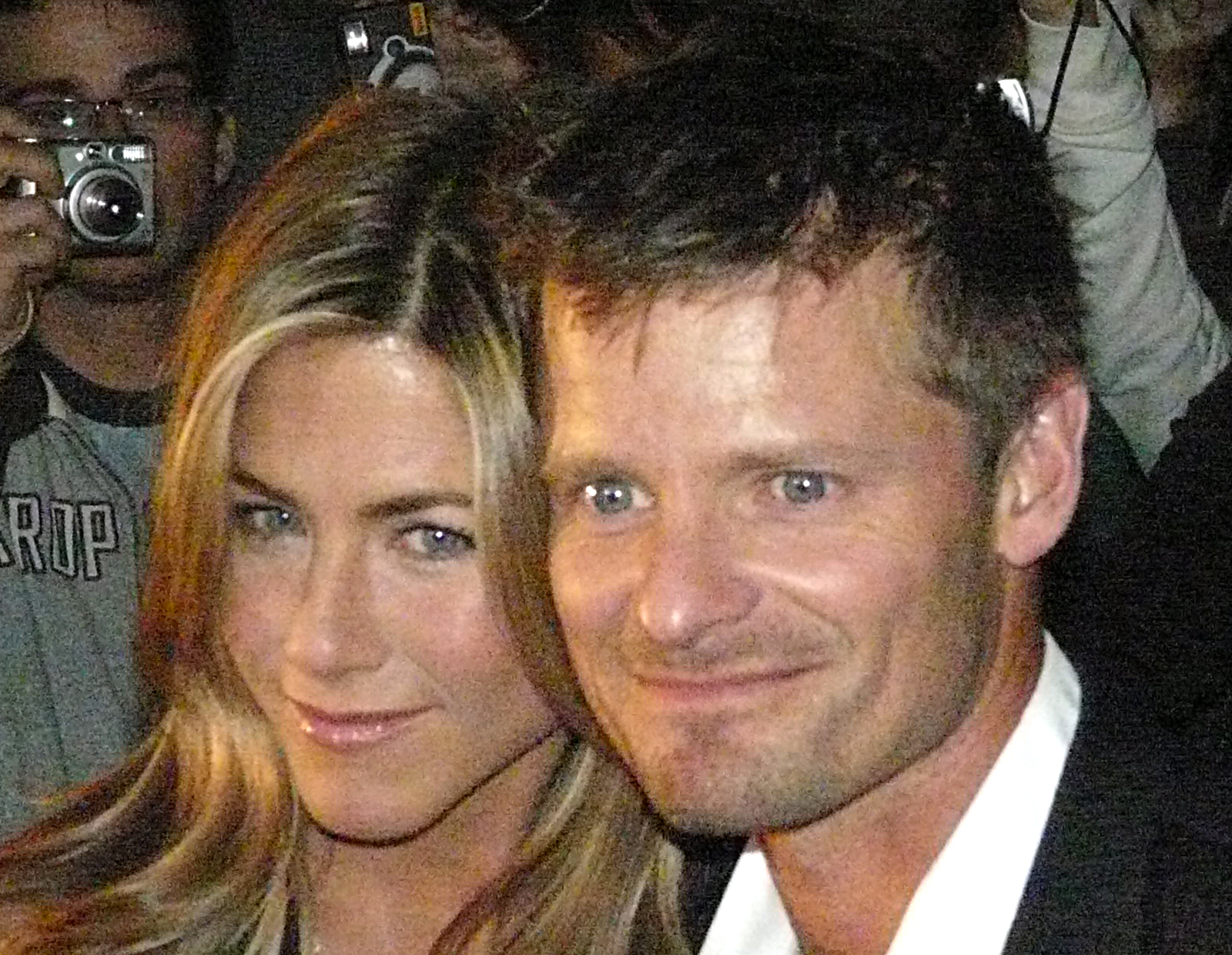
The two stars of the film (Jennifer Aniston and Steve Zahn) at its TIFF premiere.

- Jennifer Aniston as Sue Claussen
- Steve Zahn as Mike Flux
- Woody Harrelson as Jango
- Fred Ward as Jerry Flux
- Margo Martindale as Trish Flux
- James Hiroyuki Liao as Al
- Josh Lucas as Barry

== Filming ==
While set in Kingman, Arizona, Maryland, and Washington, filming took place entirely in Oregon in 2007. Sonny's Motel in Madras served as the Kingman Motor Inn, while Portland stepped in for Baltimore. Instead of Aberdeen, Washington, both Oregon City and West Linn were used to represent the hometown of Kurt Cobain. The restaurant scenes were filmed at the Aloha Mall in Aloha, Oregon off TV highway.

== Reception ==
Management received mixed reviews from critics. On Rotten Tomatoes the film has an approval rating of 46% based on reviews from 95 critics. The website's critical consensus concludes: "Clever and often beguiling performances by Steve Zahn and Jennifer Aniston can't revive this sweetly misguided stalker romance." On Metacritic it has a score of 50/100 base on reviews from 26 critics.

In a positive review, Roger Ebert of the Chicago Sun-Times gave the film three out of four stars and attributed its success largely to the casting: "In the usual course of events, a high-powered company sales executive wouldn't have much to do with Mike ... But cast Steve Zahn as the loser, and it becomes thinkable."

== Home media ==
The DVD was released on September 29, 2009. It has grossed $3,820,537 in US DVD sales.
