= Sibylla Deen =

Australian actress

- Born: Sydney, Australia
- Occupation: Actress

Sibylla Deen is an Australian actress. She is known for her portrayals of Nusrat Al Fayeed in the American television series Tyrant, Queen Ankhesenamun in the miniseries Tut and Blair in the Netflix miniseries, The I-Land.

== Life and career ==
Deen was born in Sydney, Australia, of Pakistani and English descent.

After roles in Australia, Deen starred as Nusrat Al-Fayeed on the FX series Tyrant from 2014 to 2016. In 2015 she played Queen Ankhesenamun in the miniseries Tut opposite Ben Kingsley and Avan Jogia. In August 2019, it was confirmed that Deen would star as Blair in the Netflix science fiction miniseries The I-Land, which was released on September 12, 2019.

== Filmography ==
Television and film roles
| Year | Title | Role | Notes |
|---|---|---|---|
| 2003 | Home and Away | Amber McNeil | |
| 2003–2004 | Comedy Inc. | various | |
| 2014–2016 | Tyrant | Nusrat Al-Fayeed | Main role (season 2); recurring role (seasons 1, 3) |
| 2015 | Tut | Ankhesenamun | Miniseries |
| 2017 | The Last Ship | Lucia | Recurring role (season 4); 8 episodes |
| 2017 | Lies We Tell | Amber | Film |
| 2019 | The I-Land | Blair | Miniseries |
| 2021 | Legacies | Andi | Episode: "This Feels a Little Cult-y" |
