= Randy Vasquez =

American actor and director (born 1961)

- Born: Randall J. Vasquez; October 16, 1961 (age 64); Escondido, California, U.S.
- Other name: Randy Gallion
- Occupations: Actor, martial artist, director
- Years active: 1979–present

Randall J. Vasquez (born October 16, 1961) is an American actor, martial artist and director.

== Early life ==
Vasquez was born in Escondido, California. He attended Escondido High School and is a cousin of actor and director James Vasquez, who also grew up in Escondido. His father, a school teacher and accountant, is of Mexican ancestry and his mother was a coal miner's daughter, originally from West Virginia. Vasquez's parents divorced in 1966 and he elected to live with his father in Escondido. He initially attended the University of California, Los Angeles before dropping out in 1979 to become an actor. Talent manager Bob Marcucci spotted him in an acting class and helped him find auditions. In 1984, he got his first role, a small part on Highway to Heaven.

== Career ==
Since debuting on television in 1984, Vasquez has made several appearances in TV series, most notably as Marcos in Acapulco H.E.A.T. and as Gunnery Sergeant Victor Galindez in JAG. In 1998, he was cast as bartender Paolo Kaire on Love Boat: The Next Wave. In 2002, he moved into film direction with Testimony, a documentary about Salvadorean activist Maria Guardado. In 2005, he directed a comedic drama titled Perceptions. In 2009, Vasquez returned to UCLA, where he earned a bachelor's degree in American Indian Studies. His 2011 film The Thick Dark Fog won the Best Documentary award at the 36th annual American Indian Film Festival. In 2017, he directed a third documentary, Badger Creek, a film about a Blackfeet Nation family. In 2023 Randy starred as Detective Ruiz in the indie suspense thriller What You Wish For.

== Partial filmography ==
- Highway to Heaven (TV) (Help Wanted: Angel) (1984)
- Beverly Hills Cop (1984) .... Beverly Palms Hotel Bellhop (as Randy Gallion)
- Knots Landing (TV) (6 episodes) (1989–1990) .... Ricardo Fonseca
- Almost an Angel (1990) .... Hood Nervo at Bank
- Acapulco H.E.A.T. (TV) (22 episodes) (1993–1994) .... Marcos
- The Demolitionist (1995) .... Henry 'Little Henry' Burne
- The Stranger (1995) .... Marcus
- Moonbase (1997) .... Masani
- Sliders (TV) (1 episode) (1997) .... Carlos
- Love Boat: The Next Wave (TV) (6 episodes) (1998) .... Bar Manager Paolo Kaire
- First Monday (TV) (13 episodes) (2002) .... Miguel Mora
- JAG (TV) (48 episodes) (1999–2003) .... Gunnery Sergeant Victor 'Gunny' Galindez
- Perceptions (2005) .... Mark Westin
- Level Seven (2008) .... Warden Vasquez
- The Rookie - S4E3 In the Line of Fire (2021) .... Arson Investigator Breeze
- What You Wish For (2023) .... Detective Ruiz
- Total Loss (2024) as Paul Stain
