= Frank Langella =

American actor (born 1938)

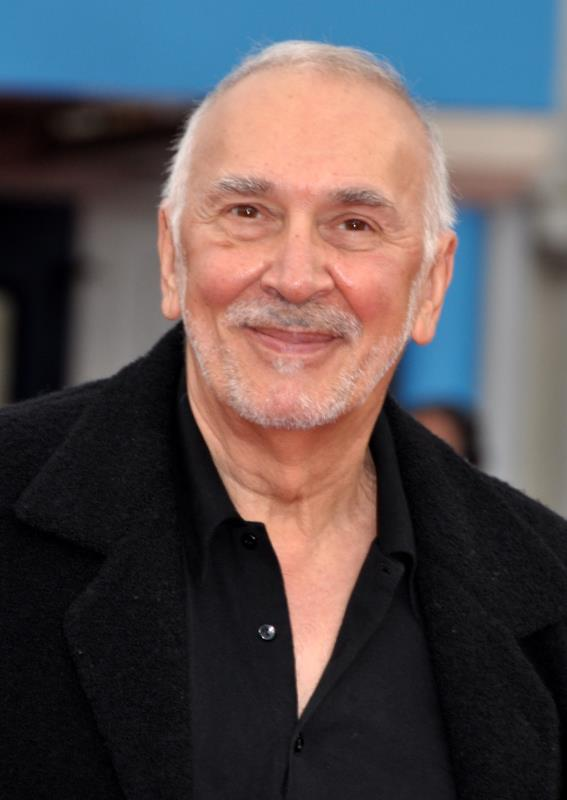
- Langella in 2012
- Born: Frank Alexander Langella Jr. January 1, 1938 (age 88); Bayonne, New Jersey, U.S.
- Education: Syracuse University (BA)
- Occupation: Actor
- Years active: 1963–present
- Spouse: Ruth Weil (m. 1977; div. 1995)
- Partner: Whoopi Goldberg (1995–2000)
- Children: 2
- Awards: Full list

Frank Alexander Langella Jr. (/lænˈdʒɛlə/; born January 1, 1938) is an American actor. He has received numerous accolades, including four Tony Awards and an Actor Award, in addition to nominations for an Academy Award, a BAFTA Award, a Primetime Emmy Award, and two Golden Globes.

Langella made his Broadway debut in the 1966 play Yerma. He went on to win four Tony Awards, his first two for Best Featured Actor in a Play playing an intellectual lizard in Edward Albee's Seascape (1975), and a wealthy and cruel landowner in Ivan Turgenev's Fortune's Fool (2002) and Best Lead Actor in a Play for his roles as Richard Nixon in Peter Morgan's Frost/Nixon (2007), an elderly man suffering from Alzheimers in Florian Zeller's The Father (2016). He was also Tony-nominated for Dracula (1979), Match (2004), and Man and Boy (2012).

Langella's reprisal of the Nixon role in the film production of Frost/Nixon directed by Ron Howard earned him an Academy Award nomination for Best Actor. Langella's other notable film roles include parts in Diary of a Mad Housewife (1970), Mel Brooks’s The Twelve Chairs (1970), Dracula (1979), Sphinx (1981), Dave (1993), The Ninth Gate (1999), Good Night, and Good Luck (2005), Starting Out in the Evening (2007), Wall Street: Money Never Sleeps (2010), All Good Things (2010), Robot & Frank (2012), Noah (2014), Captain Fantastic (2016), and The Trial of the Chicago 7 (2020).

On television, Langella portrayed Supreme Court Justice Warren Burger in the HBO movie Muhammad Ali's Greatest Fight (2013) and Senator Richard Russell Jr. in the HBO film All the Way (2016). Langella also had a recurring role as Gabriel, the KGB handler for the lead characters in the FX series The Americans (2013–2017) and Sebastian Piccirillo in the Showtime tragicomedy series Kidding (2018–2020).

== Early life and education ==
Langella, an Italian American, was born on January 1, 1938 in Bayonne, New Jersey. He is the son of Angelina Barbito (1915–1993) and Frank Alexander Langella Sr. (1913–1991), a business executive who was president of The Bayonne Barrel and Drum Company. He also had one brother named Andrew and one sister named RoseMarie. Langella attended Washington Elementary School and Bayonne High School in Bayonne. After the family moved to South Orange, New Jersey, he graduated from Columbia High School in the South Orange-Maplewood School District in 1955 and later graduated from Syracuse University in 1959 with a Bachelor of Arts degree in drama.

== Career ==
=== 1963–1989: Early roles and breakthrough ===
Langella appeared off-Broadway (in The Immoralist at the Bouwerie Lane Theatre in 1963 and Robert Lowell's The Old Glory in 1965 among other shows) before he made his first foray onto a Broadway stage in New York in Federico García Lorca's Yerma at the Vivian Beaumont Theater, Lincoln Center, on December 8, 1966. He followed this role by appearing in William Gibson's A Cry of Players, playing a young, highly fictionalized William Shakespeare opposite Anne Bancroft in 1968.

Bancroft suggested Langella to her husband Mel Brooks, who cast him in a leading role in The Twelve Chairs (1970). The same year, he also appeared in Frank Perry's Diary of a Mad Housewife, being nominated for a Golden Globe Award for Most Promising Newcomer. Langella won his first Tony Award for his performance in Edward Albee's Seascape in 1975 and was nominated again for what may have been the performance for which he was best known in the early part of his career: the title role of the 1977 Broadway production of Dracula. Despite his initial misgivings about continuing to play the role, he was persuaded to star opposite Laurence Olivier in the subsequent film version directed by John Badham.

Langella continued to alternate film and television roles with his stage work, playing Sherlock Holmes in a 1981 adaptation of William Gillette's play Sherlock Holmes. He repeated the role on Broadway in 1987 in Charles Marowitz's play Sherlock's Last Case. That same year, Langella portrayed the villain Skeletor in Masters of the Universe, one of his favorite parts. In 1988, he co-starred in the film And God Created Woman. In 1982 Langella portrayed Antonio Salieri the Broadway production of Amadeus replacing Ian McKellen. During this time he also acted in Passion in 1983, Noël Coward's Design for Living in 1984, Arthur Miller's After the Fall in 1984, and David Rabe's Hurlyburly in 1985. He also portrayed Prospero in the revival of William Shakespeare revival The Tempest.

=== 1990–2008: Broadway acclaim and Frost/Nixon ===
In 1993, Langella made a three-episode appearance on Star Trek: Deep Space Nine as the devious Bajoran Minister Jaro Essa. That same year, he also starred in the political comedy Dave starring Kevin Kline and Sigourney Weaver. He also played a supporting role in the Ivan Reitman comedy Junior with Arnold Schwarzenegger, Danny DeVito, and Emma Thompson. In 1994, he narrated the American Masters documentary on Tennessee Williams. In 1996, Langella starred in the Broadway revival of August Strindberg's The Father. That same year, Langella starred in the comedy film Eddie, starring Whoopi Goldberg, with whom he was involved romantically until 2000. He also played Clare Quilty in the 1997 film adaptation of Lolita, starring Jeremy Irons and Melanie Griffith. In 1999, Langella also starred opposite Johnny Depp in Roman Polanski's film The Ninth Gate.

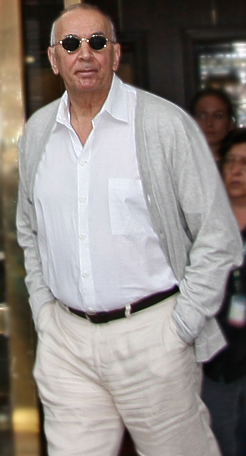
Langella at the 2007 Toronto International Film Festival

In 2000, Langella played Ebenezer Scrooge in a musical version of A Christmas Carol at Madison Square Garden. He has also appeared in notable off-Broadway productions, including in the title role of Robert Kalfin's Chelsea Theater Center production of The Prince of Homburg, which was filmed by PBS for the Theatre in America series. Langella also appeared as Al Baker in "Dominance", a 2003 episode of Law & Order: Special Victims Unit and had a recurring role as Pino in the 2005 short-lived sitcom Kitchen Confidential.

Langella returned to the stage in the 2002 Broadway revival of the Ivan Turgenev play Fortune's Fool. In the play Langella portrayed Flegont Alexandrovitch Tropatcho opposite Alan Bates. The production received critical acclaim with Langella winning his second Tony Award for Best Featured Actor in a Play and a Drama Desk Award for Outstanding Featured Actor in a Play. In 2004 he acted in the original Broadway play Match by Stephen Belber. In the play, Langella portrayed an aging dance choreographer. He acted alongside Jane Adams, and Ray Liotta. Langella received a Tony Award for Best Actor in a Play, his fourth nomination. He starred as Sir Thomas More in the 2008 Broadway revival of A Man for All Seasons.

Langella was cast as Richard Nixon opposite Michael Sheen in Peter Morgan's play Frost/Nixon, which received enthusiastic reviews during a run at the Donmar Warehouse and Gielgud Theatre in London before moving to Broadway in New York's Bernard B. Jacobs Theater in April 2007. Langella won his third Tony Award for the role. He reprised the role of Nixon in the 2008 Oscar-nominated film of the play directed by Ron Howard. Langella also earned Golden Globe, Actor Award, and BAFTA nominations for Best Actor for the same performance. Langella was also nominated for an Academy Award in the Best Actor category for the role, losing to Sean Penn's performance in Milk. Langella's film work also includes roles in George Clooney's Good Night, and Good Luck (2005) as former CBS chief executive William S. Paley, for which he was nominated for the Screen Actors Guild Award for Ensemble Cast. He also appeared in Bryan Singer's Superman Returns (2006) as Daily Planet editor Perry White. Langella was praised as well with the Boston Society of Film Critics Award in 2007 for his sensitive portrayal of an elderly novelist in Starting Out in the Evening.

=== 2009–2019: Established career ===
In late 2009, Langella starred in the Richard Kelly film The Box with Cameron Diaz and James Marsden. In 2010, he played Louis Zabel in Oliver Stone's Wall Street: Money Never Sleeps, alongside Michael Douglas, Shia LaBeouf, and Carey Mulligan. That same year, he played a supporting role in All Good Things, with Ryan Gosling and Kirsten Dunst. In 2011, Langella starred in the drama thriller Unknown, opposite Liam Neeson and Diane Kruger. In 2012, Langella earned critical praise for his role in the independent film Robot & Frank, with Peter Travers of Rolling Stone magazine calling his performance "a masterclass in acting".

In 2013, Langella starred as Chief Justice Warren E. Burger in the Stephen Frears' HBO film Muhammad Ali's Greatest Fight, with Christopher Plummer playing Justice John Marshall Harlan. In October and November 2013, Langella played King Lear at the Minerva, Chichester Festival Theatre in Chichester, UK. The play travelled to the Harvey Theater at the Brooklyn Academy of Music in New York in 2014. Langella also played Cleveland Browns owner Anthony Molina in the movie Draft Day, which also starred Kevin Costner, Jennifer Garner, and Dennis Leary. In 2015, Langella joined the cast of FX's critically praised drama The Americans with Keri Russell and Matthew Rhys. He appeared in seasons 3 through 5.

In 2016, Langella played the title role in Doug Hughes' production of the US premiere of Florian Zeller's play The Father at the Samuel J. Friedman Theatre on Broadway. He won his fourth Tony Award for that performance. That same year, he appeared in Captain Fantastic with Viggo Mortensen and was again nominated with the ensemble cast for the Screen Actors Guild Award. He also starred in the HBO television movie All the Way (2016) as Senator Richard Russell Jr., with Bryan Cranston as Lyndon B. Johnson. Langella received a Critics' Choice Television Award for Best Supporting Actor in a Movie/Miniseries nomination for his performance. From 2018 to 2020, Langella appeared as Sebestian in Showtime's Kidding, starring Jim Carrey. The show's executive producer was Michel Gondry, and it received positive reviews.

=== 2020–present ===
In 2020, Langella played Judge Julius Hoffman in Aaron Sorkin's The Trial of the Chicago 7. The film follows the Chicago Seven, a group of anti-Vietnam War protesters charged with conspiracy and crossing state lines with the intention of inciting riots at the 1968 Democratic National Convention in Chicago. It was released in September, by Netflix.

In 2022, following investigations into claims of sexual harassment on set, Langella was fired from The Fall of the House of Usher and replaced by Bruce Greenwood. In a guest column for Deadline, he claimed to have been "canceled" and denied allegations of unacceptable behavior while telling his version of events; this included calling cast members "baby" or "honey", in addition to describing guidance from an intimacy coordinator as "absurd" and ultimately going against the agreed blocking for a scene, leading his scene partner to walk off set.

== Personal life ==
=== Marriage and relationships ===
Langella has dated actresses Diane Baker and Elizabeth Taylor. He was married to Ruth Weil from November 6, 1977, to their divorce in 1995. They have two children, Frank III and Sara. He also lived with actress and comedian Whoopi Goldberg, whom he met on the set of Eddie, from 1995 until they separated in 2000.

=== Memoir ===
Langella published a memoir in 2012 called Dropped Names: Famous Men and Women As I Knew Them.

In a review in the New York Times Book Review, Ada Calhoun wrote that "Langella's book celebrates sluttiness as a worthy—even noble—way of life … There is so much happy sexuality in this book that reading it is like being flirted with for a whole party by the hottest person in the room. It's no wonder Langella was invited everywhere."

== Acting credits ==
=== Film ===
Year	Title	Role	Notes
1970	Diary of a Mad Housewife	George Prager	
1970	The Twelve Chairs	Ostap Bender	
1971	The Deadly Trap	Philippe	
1979	Dracula	Count Dracula	
1980	Those Lips, Those Eyes	Harry Crystal	
1981	Sphinx	Akmed Khazzan	
1986	The Men's Club	Harold Canterbury	
1987	Masters of the Universe	Skeletor	
1988	And God Created Woman	James Tiernan	
1991	True Identity	Leland Carver	
1992	1492: Conquest of Paradise	Santangel	
1993	Body of Evidence	Jeffrey Roston	
1993	Dave	White House Chief of Staff Bob Alexander	
1994	Brainscan	Detective Hayden	
1994	Junior	Noah Banes	
1995	Bad Company	Vic Grimes	
1995	Cutthroat Island	Dawg Brown	
1996	Eddie	Wild Bill Burgess	
1997	Lolita	Clare Quilty	
1998	Small Soldiers	Archer	Voice
1998	I'm Losing You	Perry Needham Krohn	
1998	Alegría	Giulietta's father/Fleur	
1999	The Ninth Gate	Boris Balkan	
2000	Stardom	Blaine De Castillon	
2001	Sweet November	Edgar Price	
2003	Broadway: The Golden Age	Himself	Documentary
2004	House of D	Reverend Duncan	
2004	The Novice	Father Tew	
2005	Back in the Day	Lt. Bill Hudson	
2005	How You Look to Me	Professor Driskoll	
2005	Good Night, and Good Luck	William S. Paley	
2006	Superman Returns	Perry White	
2007	Starting Out in the Evening	Leonard Schiller	
2008	The Caller	Jimmy Stevens	
2008	Frost/Nixon	Richard Nixon	
2008	The Tale of Despereaux	The Mayor	Voice
2009	The Box	Arlington Steward	
2010	Wall Street: Money Never Sleeps	Louis Zabel	
2010	All Good Things	Sanford Marks	
2011	Unknown	Rodney Cole	
2012	Robot & Frank	Frank Weld	
2012	The Time Being	Warner Dax	
2013	Parts per Billion	Andy	
2014	Muppets Most Wanted	Beefeater Vicar	Cameo
2014	Noah	Og	Voice
2014	Draft Day	Anthony Molina	
2014	5 to 7	Sam Bloom	
2014	Grace of Monaco	Father Francis Tucker	
2014	Kahlil Gibran's The Prophet	Pasha	Voice
2015	The Driftless Area	Tim Geer	
2016	Captain Fantastic	Jack Bertrang	
2016	Youth in Oregon	Raymond Engersol	
2019	Love, Antosha	Himself	Documentary
2020	The Trial of the Chicago 7	Julius Hoffman	
2022	Angry Neighbors	Harry March	

=== Television ===
Year	Title	Role	Notes
1965	The Trials of O'Brien	Michael Romani	Episode: "How Do You Get to Carnegie Hall?"
1967	NBC Experiment in Television	The Young Man	Episode: "Good Day"
1967	NET Playhouse		Episode: "Benito Cereno"
1973	Marcus Welby, M.D.	Carey Robins	Episode: "Friends in High Places"
1973	Mannix	Harry Tass	Episode: "Silent Target"
1973	Love Story	Jimmy Lewin	Episode: "When the Girls Came Out to Play"
1974	The Mark of Zorro	Don Diego de la Vega / Zorro	Television movie
1976	Swiss Family Robinson	Jean Lafitte	2 episodes
1981	Sherlock Holmes	Sherlock Holmes	Television recording of live stage production
1983	I, Leonardo: A Journey of the Mind	Leonardo da Vinci	Television documentary
1986	Liberty	Frédéric Auguste Bartholdi	Television movie
1988	CBS Summer Playhouse	Dr. Paradise	Episode: "Dr. Paradise"
1993	Star Trek: Deep Space Nine	Minister Jaro Essa	3 episodes - uncredited
1994	Doomsday Gun	Gerald Bull	Television movie
1995	Moses	Merneptah	Television movie
1996	The Greatest Pharaohs	Narrator	Voice; Documentary
2000	Jason and the Argonauts	King Aeëtes	2 episodes
2000	Cry Baby Lane	Mr. Bennett	Television movie
2001	The Beast	Jackson Burns	6 episodes
2003	Law & Order: Special Victims Unit	Al Baker	Episode: "Dominance"
2005	Now You See It...	Max	Television movie
2005	Unscripted	Goddard Fulton	10 episodes
2005–2006	Kitchen Confidential	Pino	6 episodes
2006	10.5: Apocalypse	Dr. Earl Hill	2 episodes
2013	Muhammad Ali's Greatest Fight	Warren Burger	Television movie
2015–2017	The Americans	Gabriel	31 episodes
2016	All the Way	Richard Russell Jr.	Television movie
2018	American Dad!	Commodore Francis Stoat	Voice; Episode: "Shell Game"
2018–2020	Kidding	Sebastian Piccirillo	17 episodes

=== Theater ===
Year	Title	Role	Theatre(s)
1963–1964	The Immoralist	Michael	Bouwerie Lane Theatre
1964	The Old Glory	Don Benito Cereno	Theater at St. Clement's Church
1965	Good Day	The Young Men	Cherry Lane Theatre
1965–1966	The White Devil	Flamineo	Circle in the Square Theatre
1966–1967	Yerma		Vivian Beaumont Theatre
1968–1969	A Cry of Players	Will	Vivian Beaumont Theatre
1975	Seascape	Leslie	Shubert Theatre
1976	The Prince of Homburg	Prince Friedrich Arthur of Homburg	Westside Theatre
1977–1978	Dracula	Count Dracula	Martin Beck Theatre
1982	Amadeus	Antonio Salieri	Broadhurst Theatre
1983	Passion	Jim	Longacre Theatre
1984	Design for Living	Otto	Circle in the Square Theatre
1984	After the Fall	Quentin	Playhouse 91
1985	Hurlyburly	Eddie	Ethel Barrymore Theatre
1987	Sherlock's Last Case	Sherlock Holmes	Nederlander Theatre
1989	The Tempest	Prospero	Union Square Theatre
1994	Booth	Junius	York Theatre
1996	The Father (Strindberg)	The Cavalry Captain	Criterion Center Stage Right
1996–1997	Present Laughter	Garry Essendine	Walter Kerr Theatre
1997–1998	Cyrano De Bergerac	Cyrano de Bergerac	Also director Laura Pels Theatre
2000	A Christmas Carol	Ebenezer Scrooge	Madison Square Garden
2002	Fortune's Fool	Flegont Alexandrovitch Tropatcho	Music Box Theatre
2004	Match	Tobi	Plymouth Theatre
2006–2007	Frost/Nixon	Richard Nixon	Donmar Warehouse
2006–2007	Frost/Nixon	Richard Nixon	Gielgud Theatre
2006–2007	Frost/Nixon	Richard Nixon	Bernard B. Jacobs Theatre
2008	A Man for All Seasons	Sir Thomas More	American Airlines Theatre
2011	Man and Boy	Gregor Antonescu	American Airlines Theatre
2013	King Lear	Lear	Chichester Festival Theatre
2014	King Lear	Lear	Harvey Theatre
2016	The Father (Zeller)	André	Samuel J. Friedman Theatre

=== Video game ===
Year	Title	Role	Notes
2017	Destiny 2	The Consul	Voice

== Awards and nominations ==
Year	Award	Category	Nominated work	Result
2008	Academy Award	Best Actor	Frost/Nixon	Nominated
1975	Tony Award	Best Featured Actor in a Play	Seascape	Won
1978	Tony Award	Best Actor in a Play	Dracula	Nominated
2002	Tony Award	Best Featured Actor in a Play	Fortune's Fool	Won
2004	Tony Award	Best Actor in a Play	Match	Nominated
2007	Tony Award	Best Actor in a Play	Frost/Nixon	Won
2012	Tony Award	Best Actor in a Play	Man and Boy	Nominated
2016	Tony Award	Best Actor in a Play	The Father	Won
1983	Primetime Emmy Awards	Outstanding Informational Programming	I, Leonardo: A Journey of the Mind	Nominated
1971	Golden Globe Award	Most Promising Newcomer – Male	Diary of a Mad Housewife	Nominated
2008	Golden Globe Award	Best Actor in a Drama Film	Frost/Nixon	Nominated
2008	British Academy Film Awards	Best Leading Actor	Frost/Nixon	Nominated
2005	Actor Awards	Outstanding Cast in a Motion Picture	Good Night, and Good Luck	Nominated
2008	Actor Awards	Outstanding Performance by a Male Actor in a Leading Role	Frost/Nixon	Nominated
2008	Actor Awards	Outstanding Cast in a Motion Picture	Frost/Nixon	Nominated
2016	Actor Awards	Outstanding Cast in a Motion Picture	Captain Fantastic	Nominated
2020	Actor Awards	Outstanding Cast in a Motion Picture	The Trial of the Chicago 7	Won
2008	Independent Spirit Award	Best Male Lead	Starting Out in the Evening	Nominated
2020	Capri Hollywood International Film Festival	Capri Italian-American Award	The Trial of the Chicago 7	Won
2016	Drama Desk Award	Actor in a Play	The Father	Won
1965	Obie Awards	Distinguished Performance	Good Day	Won
1966	Obie Awards	Distinguished Performance	The White Devil	Won

== See also ==
- List of Italian-American actors
- List of actors with Academy Award nominations
