= Tamsin Topolski =

British actress

Tamsin Topolski is a British actress.

The daughter of rower Daniel Topolski and actress Susan Gilmore, Topolski studied acting at the Drama Centre London.

Topolski's first prominent role was in the horror series Penny Dreadful in the second season. She would go on to make appearances in series such as Into the Badlands, Call the Midwife, Strike, and the miniseries The Rook. In 2023, Topolski was cast in the Netflix miniseries The Madness, and appeared in the film What You Wish For. Her performance won the Best Actress award at that year's Grimmfest. In 2025, she appeared in the series The Gold, and in 2026 had a role in the war drama film Pressure.

== Filmography ==
=== Film ===
Year	Title	Role	Notes
2016	Madly	Nora	Segment: "I Do"
2023	What You Wish For	Imogene	
2026	Pressure	Liz Stagg	

=== Television ===
Year	Title	Role	Notes
2014	Holby City	Shelly Lang	1 episode
2015	Penny Dreadful	Lavinia Putney	Recurring role, 5 episodes
2017	Silent Witness	Young Ellie	1 episode
2017	Strike	Ellie Fancourt	2 episodes
2018	Call the Midwife	Eunice Dobson	1 episode
2018	Into the Badlands	Wren	2 episodes
2019	The Rook	Bronwyn	Miniseries, 6 episodes
2022	Atlanta	Sharon	Episode: "White Fashion"
2022	Slow Horses	Kelly Tropper	Recurring role, 4 episodes
2023	The Diplomat	Izzy Miller	1 episode
2023	Guilt	Aliza Hillerby	3 episodes
2024	The Madness	Lucie Simon	Miniseries, 8 episodes
2025	The Gold	Alice Harper	3 episodes

=== Video games ===
Year	Title	Role	Notes
2017	Horizon Zero Dawn	Aluki	Voice
