= Gene Frankel =

American actor, theater director, and acting teacher

Eugene V. Frankel
- Born: December 23, 1919
- Died: April 20, 2005 (aged 85); Manhattan, New York, U.S.
- Occupations: Actor, theater director, acting teacher

Eugene V. Frankel (December 23, 1919 – April 20, 2005) was an American actor, theater director, and acting teacher especially notable in the founding of the off-Broadway scene. Frankel served in the Army during World War II in entertainment and as a member of an aerial crew.

== Life and career ==
Frankel's direction of the off-Broadway production of Jean Genet's The Blacks was regarded as a crucial production in promoting African-American theater during the civil-rights movement which opened in 1961 and ran at St. Mark's Theatre for more than 1,400 performances, the longest-running Off-Broadway non-musical of the decade. The cast included James Earl Jones, Roscoe Lee Browne, Louis Gossett Jr., Cicely Tyson, Godfrey Cambridge, Maya Angelou and Charles Gordone; sets were by Kim E. Swados, music by Charles Gross, and costumes and masks by Patricia Zipprodt.

He began his own career as an actor and was one of the earliest members of the Actors Studio. He moved behind the scenes and became a theater director on and off Broadway. His most notable Broadway production was Arthur Kopit's Indians starring Stacy Keach, who was nominated for the 1970 Tony Award as Best Actor for his portrayal of Buffalo Bill. The production was also nominated for a Tony Award for best play of 1970.

His other Broadway productions included A Cry of Players (1968), Kurt Weill's Lost in the Stars (1972) and Harry Chapin's The Night That Made America Famous (1975). His off-Broadway productions included Brecht on Brecht, (starring Viveca Lindfors, Lotte Lenya, Eli Wallach and Anne Jackson), I Am a Woman (again with Lindfors), and To Be Young, Gifted and Black starring Cicely Tyson. He directed an Arthur Miller play when Miller was married to Marilyn Monroe.

== Gene Frankel Theatre ==
As well as directing over 200 shows and managing at least twelve theaters throughout his career, Frankel taught acting, writing and directing. His last stage was the Gene Frankel Theatre and Film Workshop at 24 Bond Street in Greenwich Village. Frankel said that the heart of successful acting was, "Truth. I don't let my actors tell lies. The camera doesn't lie, the stage doesn't let you lie." He was a visiting professor in theater at various institutions of higher learning including Columbia University, Boston College, and New York University.

On August 4, 1973, his Mercer Arts Center, a complex of seven small theaters, which had been located on the first two floors of the residential Broadway Central Hotel, physically collapsed. Frankel, who had been conducting a rehearsal at the time, noticed the ceiling and walls beginning to buckle and heroically led the actors and several residents to safety; five people died in the collapse.

Only his last theater was a financial success, serving as home to artistic director Christopher Groenwald's New Mercury Players and as a satellite location for artistic director Marilyn Majeski's Grove Street Playhouse.

In 2003 Frankel made Gail Thacker Managing Director of the Gene Frankel Theatre and Film Workshop at the Bond Street location. Upon Frankel's death his legacy passed into Thacker's trust.

== Family ==
Frankel had two children, Laura Frankel and Ethan Frankel. His son, an aspiring actor who studied at his father's school, had struggled with psychiatric illness which led him to leap off the top of a Manhattan 17-floor-building in 1995 during a psychosis, from which he survived. After a lengthy coma and therapy to learn to walk again, Ethan was placed in a group home in the Bronx, where he was murdered by a fellow resident the following year. Gene Frankel created a scholarship at his theater in his son's name.

== Productions ==
=== Broadway ===
- The Night That Made America Famous, February 26, 1975 – April 6, 1975
- The Lincoln Mask, October 30, 1972 – November 4, 1972
- Lost in the Stars, April 18, 1972 – May 21, 1972
- The Engagement Baby, May 21–23, 1970
- Indians, October 13, 1969 – January 3, 1970
- A Cry of Players, November 14, 1968 – February 15, 1969
- Once There Was a Russian, February 18, 1961

=== Off-Broadway ===
- A Gun Play, Cherry Lane Theatre
- To Be Young, Gifted and Black, Cherry Lane Theatre
- The Niggerlovers, Orpheum Theatre
- The Firebugs, Maidman Playhouse
- Brecht on Brecht, Sheridan Square Playhouse
  - Brecht on Brecht : His Life in Art, Lucille Lortel Theatre
  - Brecht on Brecht, Lucille Lortel Theatre
- The Blacks: A Clown Show, St. Mark's Playhouse
- Volpone, Rooftop Theatre

== Awards and honors ==
Frankel was awarded the first Obie Award for directing, with his production of Volpone (1958) and then won two more also for directing. He also received the first Lola d'Annunzi and Vernon Rice awards for outstanding achievement in theater.

=== Obie Awards ===
- 1956–57 Best Director for Ben Jonson's Volpone
- 1959–60 Best Director for Sophie Treadwell's Machinal
- 1960–61 Best Play for Jean Genet's The Blacks

=== Other ===
- Drama Desk Vernon Rice Award for Outstanding Achievement in Theatre
- Lola D'Annunzio Award for Lifetime Achievement In Theatre
