= Match (play) =

- Written by: Stephen Belber
- Characters: Tobi; Mike; Lisa
- Original language: English
- Genre: Drama/Comedy
- Setting: Tobi's Apartment in Upper Manhattan

Premiere
- Date premiered: April 8, 2004
- Place premiered: Plymouth Theatre

Match is a dramatic comedy by Stephen Belber.

== History ==
The character of Tobi is inspired by Alphonse Poulin, a professor of ballet at Juilliard School.

== Synopsis ==
Tobi is an aging dancer, choreographer and teacher who enjoys knitting. His quiet life is interrupted when Mike and Lisa enter his home under the pretense of interviewing him for Lisa's thesis.

== Productions ==
The Broadway production was directed by Nicholas Martin. The play starred Frank Langella as Tobi with Ray Liotta as Mike and Jane Adams as Lisa. The show ran for about two months. For his role as Tobi, Langella was nominated for the Tony Award for Best Actor in a Play.

== Adaptations ==
Belber adapted the play into the 2014 film Match, which he also directed.
