= Karen Pittman =

American actress

- Born: 1975 or 1976 (age 50–51)
- Education: Northwestern University (BA); New York University (MFA)
- Occupation: Actress
- Years active: 2009–present
- Children: 2

Karen Pittman (born 1975 or 1976) is an American actress. She began her career with small appearances on television shows such as 30 Rock, Law & Order and House of Cards. She went on to land recurring roles in The Americans (2014–2016) and Luke Cage (2016–2018). Pittman rose to prominence starring as Mia Jordan in the Apple TV+ drama series The Morning Show (2019–present) and as Dr. Nya Wallace in the HBO Max comedy-drama, And Just Like That... (2021–2023). Her performance in the third season of The Morning Show earned her a nomination for the Primetime Emmy Award for Outstanding Supporting Actress in a Drama Series.

== Early life, family and education ==
Pittman earned a Bachelor of Arts in Voice and Opera at Northwestern University and a Masters of Fine Arts from New York University's Graduate Acting Program. Prior to entering acting as a profession, Pittman worked in finance, pivoting to acting after realizing "money isn't everything."

== Career ==
Pittman has portrayed the character of Jory in the 2012 Lincoln Center production of Disgraced and has performed in FX Network's The Americans and Netflix's Luke Cage, as Lisa and Inspector Priscilla Ridley, respectively.

Since 2019, Pittman has starred as Mia Jordan in the Apple TV+ drama series The Morning Show for which she was nominated for a Screen Actors Guild Award for Outstanding Performance by an Ensemble in a Drama Series, along with the cast in 2022 and 2024. For its third season, she was nominated for the Primetime Emmy Award for Outstanding Supporting Actress in a Drama Series and the Critics' Choice Television Award for Best Supporting Actress in a Drama Series. In 2021, she began starring as Dr. Nya Wallace in the HBO Max comedy-drama, And Just Like That.... She acted in both series in the same time. In 2022, she played her first leading role, in the romantic drama film, Unthinkably Good Things directed by Terri J. Vaughn. She later starred alongside Corey Stoll in the crime drama film, What We Do Next.

== Personal life ==
Pittman is the mother of two children, Jake and Lena. She has spoken in several interviews about the challenges of raising children as a single mother.

In 2024, Pittman announced her engagement to Ade Richardson on Today with Jenna and Hoda. Pittman's The Morning Show costar Greta Lee (alongside other cast and crew on the show) threw an engagement party on set in celebration.

== Filmography ==
=== Film ===
Year	Title	Role	Notes
2010	Last Night	Caroline	
2012	The Bourne Legacy	Landy Reporter	
2013	Begin Again	Business Woman	
2014	The Rewrite	Naomi Watkins	
2016	Custody	Elaine Dunbar	
2017	Was It Rape Then?	Fury	Short
2017	Detroit	Mrs. Dismukes	
2017	Benji the Dove	Laura	
2022	Toy Phone	Sofia	Short, also executive producer
2022	What We Do Next	Sandy James	

=== Television ===
Year	Title	Role	Notes
2009	Great Performances	Mom - Understudy	Episode: "Passing Strange"
2009	30 Rock	Nurse	Episode: "St. Valentine's Day"
2009	Law & Order	Amanda Rendina	Episode: "Bailout"
2009	Kings	TV Reporter	Episode: "Prosperity"
2009	Medium	Nurse #3	Episode: "The Man in the Mirror"
2010	White Collar	Press Secretary	Episode: "Need to Know"
2010	Law & Order: Special Victims Unit	FBI Agent Wilcox	Episode: "Locum"
2011	One Life to Live	Nurse #1	Guest role (4 episodes)
2013	The Good Wife	Dr. Patricia Serling	Episode: "A Precious Commodity"
2014	House of Cards	Elizabeth Ward	Episode: "Chapter 19"
2014, 2019	The Blacklist	Interrogator #2, Miss Holt	Episodes: "Berlin (No. 8)", "The Corsican (No. 20)"
2014–2016	The Americans	Lisa	Recurring role (seasons 2–4)
2016	Horace and Pete	Rhonda	Episodes: "1.7", "1.8"
2016	Person of Interest	Tracey Phillips	Episode: "Synecdoche"
2016	Blindspot	Elizabeth Gubara	Episode: "If Beth"
2016	Madam Secretary	Taylor Wilson	Episode: "The Race"
2016–2018	Luke Cage	Priscilla Ridley	
2017	Elementary	Daria Wyngold	Episode: "Moving Targets"
2017	Love You More	Raquel	TV short
2018	Girlfriends' Guide to Divorce	Patricia	Episode: "It Takes Two to Stab Yourself in the Butt"
2019	Live from Lincoln Center	Nya	Episode: "Pipeline"
2019	NOS4A2	Angela Brewster	Episodes: "The Shorter Way", "The Graveyard of What Might Be"
2019–present	The Morning Show	Mia Jordan	Main role
2019	Living with Yourself	Lenore Pool	
2019	Evil	Caroline Hopkins	Episodes: ″October 31″, ″Exorcism Part 2″
2020	Yellowstone	Willa Hays	Recurring role (season 3)
2021–2023	And Just Like That...	Dr. Nya Wallace	Main role
2022	Unthinkably Good Things		TV film
2025	Forever	Dawn	Main role

=== Theater ===
Year	Title	Role	Venuye	Notes
2012-2014	Disgraced	Jory	Off-Broadway, Lincoln Center Theatre	Theater World Award
2015	King Liz	Liz Rico	Off-Broadway, Second Stage Theatre	
2017	Pipeline	Nya	Off-Broadway, Lincoln Center Theatre	Broadcast on PBS in 2019
