= Fortune's Fool (1848 play) =

1848 Russian play by Ivan Turgenev

Bates and Langella on the poster for the 2002 Broadway production

Fortune's Fool (Russian: Нахлебник Nakhlebnik) is an 1848 play by Ivan Turgenev.

== Plot ==
The setting is a vast Russian country estate where the resident aristocrats and their many servants are jolted out of their tranquility by the arrival of someone from the city, down-on-his-luck Vassily Semyonitch Kuzovkin, whose own property has been tied up for years in a hopeless lawsuit. At one time a "court jester" to the estate's original owner, Kuzovkin remained in the house as a permanent guest following his master's death. He is anxious about the impending homecoming of the heiress to the estate and her new husband, fearful that, having forgotten the warm relationship they once shared, she will expect him to move out. Wealthy neighbor Flegont Alexandrovitch Tropatchov, who disdains Kuzovkin and the poverty he represents, goads him into drinking too much at a lunch that culminates in his drunkenly revealing an unsettling secret that disrupts the lives of everyone involved and forces them to deal with the consequences of his rash action.

A century and a half after it was written in 1848, Fortune's Fool was staged on Broadway for the first time in an adaptation by Mike Poulton. After 28 previews, the production opened on April 2, 2002, at the Music Box Theatre, where it ran for 127 performances. The cast, under the direction of Arthur Penn, included Alan Bates (who had starred in a production staged at the Chichester Festival Theatre with Ashley Artus, Desmond Barrit, Rachel Pickup, and John Bardon) and the Theatre Royal in Bath in 1996), Frank Langella, Benedick Bates (Alan's son), and Enid Graham.

From 6 December 2013 Mike Poulton's adaptation of Fortune's Fool starring Iain Glen (later replaced by Patrick Cremin and Will Houston) and Richard McCabe and directed by Lucy Bailey received its West End premiere at The Old Vic. The cast includes Lucy Briggs-Owen, Dyfan Dwyfor, Janet Fullerlove, Paul Ham, Richard Henders, Simon Markey and Alexander Vlahos.

== Awards and nominations ==
- Tony Award for Best Play (nominee)
- Tony Award for Best Actor in Play (Alan Bates, winner)
- Tony Award for Best Featured Actor in a Play (Frank Langella, winner)
- Drama Desk Award for Outstanding Actor in a Play (Bates, winner)
- Drama Desk Award for Outstanding Featured Actor in a Play (Langella, winner)
