= Man and Boy (play) =

Play written by Terence Rattigan

- Charles Boyer on Playbill cover for original 1963 Broadway production
- Original language: English
- Written by: Terence Rattigan

Premiere
- Date: 1963
- Place: Queen's Theatre, London (4 September 1963); Brooks Atkinson Theatre, New York (12 November 1963)

Man and Boy is a play by Terence Rattigan. It was first performed at The Queen's Theatre, London, and Brooks Atkinson Theatre, New York, in 1963, with Charles Boyer starring as Gregor Antonescu. It had a Broadway revival in 2011 with Frank Langella and Adam Driver.

== Synopsis ==
The play is a study of a ruthless, sociopathic businessman: his inability to love and the impact of this on others (notably, his son and his wife). The central character Gregor Antonescu was based on the lives of Ivar Kreuger, the Swedish Match King, and Samuel Insull the Anglo-American investor.

== Cast and characters ==
Character	Broadway debut	West End debut	Broadway Revival	London Revival
Character	1963	2005	2011	2026
Gregor Antonescu	Charles Boyer	David Suchet	Frank Langella	Ben Daniels
Basil Anthony	Barry Justice	Ben Silverstone	Adam Driver	Laurie Kynaston
David Beeston	William Smithers	Will Huggins	Michael Cristofer	Leo Wan
Carol Penn	Louise Sorel	Jennifer Lee Jellicorse	Virginia Kull	Phoebe Campbell
Sven Johnson	Geoffrey Keen	Colin Stinton	Zack Grenier	Nick Fletcher
Mark Herries	Austin Willis	David Yelland	Brian Hutchison	Malcolm Sinclair

== Production history ==
The play, directed by Michael Benthall, opened at the Theatre Royal, Brighton on 19 August 1963, moving to the Queen's Theatre in London on 4 September and transferring to the Brooks Atkinson Theatre on Broadway on 12 November. It was poorly received, with a limited London run and only 54 performances on Broadway; but was revived by Maria Aitken in 2005 at the Duchess Theatre, London, with David Suchet as Gregor Antonescu, to great acclaim. Maria Aitken again directed the play for Roundabout Theatre Company on Broadway in the fall of 2011 at the American Airlines Theatre starring Tony Award winner Frank Langella as Antonescu and Academy Award nominee Adam Driver as Basil. The Australian premiere of Man and Boy was performed at the Garrick Theatre in Perth, Western Australia, in June 2007.

In 2026, London's Royal National Theatre staged a revival of Man and Boy, directed by Anthony Lau and starring Ben Daniels and Laurie Kynaston.

== Awards and nominations ==
Year	Award	Category	Nominee	Result	Ref.
2011	Tony Awards	Best Actor in a Play	Frank Langella	Nominated	
