= Michelle Veintimilla =

American actress

- Education: Carnegie Mellon University (BFA)
- Occupations: Film, television & theater actress
- Years active: 2007–present
- Spouse: Eddy Lee (m. 2023)

Michelle Veintimilla is an Ecuadorian American film, television, and theater actress. She is best known for starring as Vanessa Sanchez in the ABC rom-com series The Baker and The Beauty. Her breakout role was villain Firefly in the second and fourth seasons of the Fox television series Gotham. She portrayed Carmen Guerra on FOX's The Gifted Marie Jablonski on the Netflix crime drama series Seven Seconds,, Hayden on the Netflix science fiction miniseries, The I-Land, and frequently appears on NBC's Law and Order SVU as couselor Christine Vega.

== Career ==
Veintimilla was a senior at Carnegie Mellon University when she got the offer to perform in the musical The Visit at the Williamstown Theater Festival in 2014. She eventually went on to appear in the Broadway production of The Visit, playing the younger version of Chita Rivera's character, marking her Broadway debut.

She portrayed the DC Comics' super-villain Bridgit Pike/Firefly in the series Gotham. She appeared in two episodes of season two. After being replaced by Camila Perez for the third season, she returned to the role with the fourth season episode "Mandatory Brunch Meeting".

In 2019, she appeared in a developmental presentation of The Civilians new musical Store Brand, written and composed by Zack Zadek. In August 2019, it was confirmed that Veintimilla would star as Hayden in the Netflix science fiction miniseries, The I-Land, which premiered on September 12, 2019.

In 2020, Veintimilla starred in the ABC series The Baker and the Beauty.

In 2022, she played Actress/Bachelorette/Casting Director in the world premiere production of Which Way to the Stage off-Broadway.

In 2024, she starred as Carla Albanese in Andy Blankenbueler's production on NINE at The Kennedy Center.

== Personal life ==
In June 2023, she married Broadway actor Eddy Lee.

== Filmography ==
=== Film ===
Year	Title	Role	Notes
2014	Blue in Green	woman	Short film
2014	Not Cool	Janié	
2015	Fathers and Daughters	Michelle	
2015	Love the Coopers	Kendra	Uncredited
2017	The Depths	Chastity	
2019	Drunk Parents	Rachel	
2022	What We Do Next	Elsa Mercado	

=== Television ===
Year	Title	Role	Notes
2007	One Life to Live	Principal Dancer	2 episodes
2013	Redwood Time	Alise	7 episodes
2014	Those Who Kill	Sarah Branson	2 episodes
2014	The Chair	Herself	7 episodes
2015	The Good Wife	Nurse	1 episode
2015–2016; 2018	Gotham	Bridgit Pike / Firefly	Seasons 2 and 4; recurring guest star
2015, 2024	Blue Bloods	Sybil Cairo, Maria Duran	Season 6, Ep. 7; Season 14, Ep. 2&3
2015	Limitless	Ava Pouran	1 episode
2017	The Gifted	Carmen Guerra	Recurring guest star (3 episodes)
2018	Seven Seconds	Marie Joblanski	Series regular (10 episodes)
2019	The I-Land	Hayden	Miniseries
2020	Prodigal Son	Andy	1 episode
2020	The Baker and the Beauty	Vanessa	Main role
2021	Big Sky	Rosie Amaya	Recurring
2026	Watson	Paola Barajas	Episode: "Wrongful Life"
