= Seascape (play) =

1974 play by Edward Albee

- Original language: English
- Written by: Edward Albee
- Characters: Nancy; Leslie; Charlie; Sarah
- Genre: Drama

Premiere
- Date: January 26, 1975
- Place: Shubert Theatre; New York City, New York

Seascape is a two-act play by American playwright Edward Albee. He completed it in 1974, having first developed it in 1967 as a short play named Life, the first half of a projected double bill with another play called Death (which later became All Over). Seascape won the 1975 Pulitzer Prize for Drama.

== Productions ==
The play started on Broadway at the Sam S. Shubert Theatre on January 26, 1975, and closed on March 22, 1975, after 65 performances. Directed by Albee, the cast starred Deborah Kerr (Nancy), Barry Nelson (Charlie), Maureen Anderman (Sarah) and Frank Langella (Leslie). Langella won the 1975 Tony Award, Featured Actor in a Play. The play was nominated for the 1975 Tony Award, Play and Lighting Design (Play or Musical) (James Tilton).

The original three-act version of the play ran in Europe. Albee "jettisoned a large section of the play" during the out of town tryout in Baltimore, prior to the Broadway premiere.

Albee received his second Pulitzer Prize for Drama in 1975 for the play.

Seascape was revived on Broadway by Lincoln Center Theater at the Booth Theatre on October 28, 2005 (previews) and closed on January 8, 2006, after 27 previews and 55 performances. Directed by Mark Lamos, the cast starred George Grizzard (Charlie), Frances Sternhagen (Nancy), Elizabeth Marvel (Sarah), and Frederick Weller (Leslie). The sets were by Michael Yeargan, costumes by Catherine Zuber, and lighting by Peter Kaczorowski.

The original three-act version received its American premiere in Boston in a production by Zeitgeist Stage Company at the Boston Center for the Arts Plaza Theater in October 2008 through a special arrangement with the playwright. The director was David J. Miller, with lights by Jeff Adelberg, costumes by Fabian Aguilar, fights & movement by Meron Langsner, and sound by Walter Eduardo. The cast consisted of Michelle Dowd as Nancy (who won an IRNE Award for Best Actress for the role), Peter Brown as Charlie, Claude Del as Leslie, and Emma Goodman as Sarah. The original second act is set entirely underwater.

== Overview ==
Like many of Albee's plays, Seascape focuses on communication in interpersonal relationships, in this case between couples. Albee's first Broadway play, Who's Afraid of Virginia Woolf? (1962), and his first Pulitzer Prize-winning play, A Delicate Balance (1966), are also concerned with this topic. Seascape is different from these dramas on several counts. Seascape is not strictly a drama but, according to various critics, has elements of comedy, fantasy, satire and absurdism.

In Seascape, Nancy and Charlie, an American couple on the verge of the major life change of retirement, are having problems in their relationship. They are discussing these matters on the beach when another couple appears, two human-sized lizards named Leslie and Sarah who speak and act like people. The lizards have evolved to such a degree that they no longer feel at home in the sea and are compelled to seek life on the land. What the lizards experience with Nancy and Charlie nearly drives them back to the sea, but with an offer of help from the human couple, they decide to stay.

This relatively happy ending is not common in many of Albee's previous plays, and some critics find it refreshing. Before Albee won the Pulitzer Prize for drama for Seascape, however, many critics reacted negatively to the first production. Only a few had generally positive responses. One was Clive Barnes of The New York Times who writes, "What Mr. Albee has given us here is a play of great density, with many interesting emotional and intellectual reverberations." The Nation's Harold Clurman places Seascape in a positive context in terms of Albee's development as a playwright. He believes, "It is his most relaxed play, a 'philosophical' whimsy."

The nod to absurdism is not only found in having half the cast being human/lizards but also in a few staging elements. For example, several times throughout the play a jet flies above, and each time Nancy and Charlie repeat the same dialog for two or three lines.

== Summary ==
=== Act I ===
Seascape opens on a beach. An older couple, Nancy and Charlie, has finished a picnic lunch. As Nancy cleans up, the noise of a jet flying low engulfs the stage. Charlie predicts that a jet will someday smash into a dune.

Nancy expresses her desire to be near the water forever. She loves everything about it and would like to travel from beach to beach. Charlie responds negatively to her dreams. He does not want to do anything or go anywhere.

Charlie's attitude angers Nancy. She points out that life is short. She threatens to have adventures on her own. Charlie's attitude changes after Nancy's outburst, and she retreats from her plan a bit. She is content to enjoy the moment.

After another jet passes by, Nancy reminds Charlie about his childhood desire to live under the water. Charlie tells her how he would sink to the bottom of a pool or lake and sit there until he had to breathe. Nancy encourages him to do this again and get in touch with his youth. Charlie refuses, embarrassed by her insistence.

Nancy changes the subject to their sex life. She tells him about a time in their marriage when she thought of divorcing him. There was tension, and she suspected that he was having an affair. Charlie denies this, and Nancy accepts his word.

Nancy encourages him to sink under the water again and to show her how he did it. Charlie again refuses and turns the conversation to her. He tells her that she was a good wife. Nancy says the same about him, listing the many ways in which he was a good husband. When she is done, she is bitter because the "good life" they have had seems limited to her. Charlie is hurt by her attitude. They argue. Nancy is still angry that his only interest is to rest, while she wants to experience new things.

During a pause at the end of their heated argument, Leslie, a human-sized male lizard, takes a peek at them. Nancy tries to get Charlie to help write postcards, but he declines. Leslie peeks at them again, this time with his female mate, Sarah. Nancy sees the lizards and is intrigued. Charlie is afraid.

Charlie demands that Nancy find him something to defend them with. When she can only find a small, thin stick, Charlie is peeved. Nancy remains interested in the lizards, but when Leslie clears his throat, she fears the lizards might hurt them.

When Leslie waves his large stick, Nancy and Charlie admit their love for each other, Nancy more reluctantly than Charlie. As Leslie and Sarah move forward, another jet flies by and scares them away. Charlie tries to blame the whole episode on bad liver paste sandwiches. He believes they are dead from food poisoning. Nancy ridicules the idea.

Nancy is pleased when Leslie and Sarah return. To protect themselves, Nancy believes they should show submission by lying on their backs with their legs and arms up, as a dog would. Charlie assumes the position, though with great reluctance.

=== Act II ===
Act II opens where act I ended. Leslie and Sarah are unsure about Nancy and Charlie's submissive stance. When Leslie and Sarah approach, Charlie threatens to scream. Nancy is much calmer. Leslie pokes Charlie and Nancy in the side, but neither one moves. Leslie and Sarah decide that Nancy and Charlie are relatively harmless.

Charlie is unsure about the creatures, while Nancy is fascinated by everything about them. Leslie and Sarah decide to approach them again. Leslie pokes Charlie hard, causing Charlie to speak. Leslie replies several times, but Charlie will not speak to the creature. Nancy finally sits up and greets Sarah. Charlie only says hello after Nancy encourages him.

Sarah and Nancy believe that the tension has been defused, but Leslie and Charlie are still uncertain of each other. With Nancy's prodding, Charlie assures Leslie that they are not unfriendly. Though Leslie and Sarah speak English, they do not understand many of the words and ideas that Charlie and Nancy use.

Nancy tries to shake Leslie's flipper, but Leslie cannot grasp the concept. Nancy and Charlie explain the concept of the handshake, as well as their differing anatomy. The lizards have only legs and flippers. Nancy finally shakes hands with the lizards. Charlie tries to shake hands with Leslie, but Leslie is still uncertain about him. Leslie and Charlie talk about their differences. Leslie asks about their clothing. Among other things, Nancy tells them that clothes cover their sexual organs.

This leads to a discussion of the humans' sex organs, especially Nancy's breasts. The lizards do not have these organs. Nancy shows Sarah, who is fascinated. Leslie also wants to see, but Charlie is uncomfortable with the idea. To change the subject, Charlie asks about their children. Sarah and Leslie have produced seven thousand eggs. Leslie is appalled when he learns that the humans do not lay eggs. Nancy explains human gestation and that they have three children.

When Nancy tells them that they keep their children for many years, she also explains the concept of love. This and all other emotions are foreign concepts to the lizards. Charlie asks how Sarah and Leslie became paired. Leslie fought off other lizards when Sarah reached her maturity and started to mate. He wanted her, but emotions did not play a role.

Charlie brings up the idea of disloyalty in Leslie and Sarah's relationship. This upsets Nancy. The issue also confuses Sarah and Leslie. Charlie is nearly attacked by Leslie when he angrily compares the male lizard to a fish. The women calm the men down and Leslie explains his disdainful attitude toward fish. They discuss the ideas of prejudice and difference.

Sarah looks up and sees birds flying by. Leslie becomes defensive. Nancy explains to Sarah that the birds are seagulls. The females compare them to underwater rays. Nancy tells Sarah that she has seen photographs of rays. Nancy and Charlie cannot explain what photography is to her, so Sarah believes they are insulting her. When Leslie returns, Sarah explains what has happened.

Abruptly changing the subject, Nancy declares that Charlie believes that they are dead. She continues to dig into Charlie, sarcastically saying that no wonders are possible. Leslie and Sarah catch on to her meaning, to some degree, but Leslie is confused by the idea that reality is an illusion. When Leslie asks Charlie to explain it, Charlie becomes angry.

After Nancy calms him down, another jet flies by. Leslie and Sarah are fearful. Nancy and Charlie explain the idea of the airplane. Charlie talks about other machines including those that go undersea. Nancy tells the lizards about the times in Charlie's youth when he would sink under water and stay there. Angry at Nancy, Charlie changes the subject and asks the lizards why they came out of the sea in the first place. They do not know, other than they have changed somehow and do not belong there anymore.

This prompts Charlie to explain the idea of evolution, but Leslie and Sarah do not understand it fully. The lizards can only think in terms of themselves. When Sarah asks if progress is good, Charlie is uncertain. Every term and idea has to be explained to the lizards, leading to more frustration for Charlie, as well as Leslie and Sarah.

Charlie asks Sarah what she would do if Leslie went away and did not come back. Nancy becomes angry at him for asking. Sarah is upset by the question and wants to go back to the sea. Leslie hits and chokes Charlie for making Sarah cry. Leslie and Sarah decide to go back. Nancy tells them to stay because eventually they will have to come back. Nancy, and to some degree Charlie, offer their help. Leslie accepts their offer.

== Character analysis ==
=== Charlie ===
Charlie is married to Nancy and is part of the human couple at the center of the play. Unlike his wife, Charlie is fearful and passive. While Nancy wants to have an active retirement, Charlie wants to rest and do nothing. He does not understand his wife's need to connect with the past and explore the world they have not seen. Charlie admits to having a more adventurous spirit in his youth. He would release his breath and sink to the bottom of pools or other bodies of water until he had to rise to breathe again. Charlie liked to do this then but has no desire to do it now. He is content with the way things currently are in his life and does not like to be challenged.

It is Nancy who first antagonizes him. Nancy's idea about living at different beaches for the rest of their lives is distasteful to him. He will not let her push him into even considering such a lifestyle. Nancy later tells him, much to his surprise, that she considered divorcing him a long time ago because she believed he was having an affair. Charlie tells her he did not have such a liaison, and she believes him. Charlie was happy with the way his life with Nancy was and still is. Their disagreements over this matter are overshadowed by the appearance of the lizards.

If Charlie is uncomfortable with Nancy and her desires, he has bigger problems with the lizards. At first, he insists that they are a death hallucination caused by rotten liver paste sandwiches. While the creatures intrigue Nancy, Charlie continually acts with fear and resistance. He follows his wife's lead on posing submissively when the creatures first approach, but he will not respond to them until she orders him to. Even after the ice has been broken, Charlie remains uncertain about the creatures and their intentions. Leslie and Sarah's ignorance on many things (emotions, anatomy, etc.) adds to Charlie's negative attitude. When he has to explain these ideas to them, he is easily frustrated and often condescending. He drives Leslie to beat and choke him. Yet at the end, Charlie agrees with Nancy that the lizards have to stay on land and not go back into the water. Though he helps because Nancy will do it whether or not he agrees, Charlie does offer to take them by the hand.

=== Nancy ===
Nancy is the female half of the human couple in the play; she is married to Charlie. Unlike her husband, Nancy is vibrant and curious about the world. When the play opens, she wants to live at the beach forever. Now that her children are grown, Nancy wants to have adventures. Charlie does not share her desires and does his best to discourage them. Despite Charlie's negative attitude, Nancy remains open to what comes her way, including the lizards.

Nancy's relationship with Charlie is somewhat strained. Nancy is angry at Charlie's passivity. Her attempts to encourage Charlie to sink underwater as he did as a child meet with a negative response. This frustrates her. Over the course of the first act, it is revealed that she once considered divorcing him because she believed that he was having an affair. Though she readily accepts his word when he says he did not, she does not think the "good life" they had together has been all that it could be. Still, Nancy remains loyal to Charlie. While she threatens to have adventures on her own, she does nothing about it.

When the lizards approach them, Nancy is fascinated but a little afraid. She remains close to Charlie. Though she does not agree with him, she does find him a small stick to use as a defense. It is Nancy who comes up with the idea of lying down in a submissive posture when Leslie and Sarah come near. Charlie follows Nancy's directions in most of the dealings with the lizards. After it becomes clear that the lizards will not harm them, Nancy is excited by their presence. She does everything she can to learn about them and make a connection with them. She wants to shake hands with them first.

Charlie is uncomfortable with the lengths to which his wife goes to connect with the lizards. Because Sarah has never seen a mammal's mammaries, Nancy shows Sarah her breasts and explains their function. Nancy would also have shown Leslie except for Charlie's protestations. While Nancy does become a bit frustrated with the lizards' intellectual limitations, she becomes increasingly annoyed with Charlie's condescending attitude toward them. Yet, when the lizards want to go back—after Charlie drives Sarah to tears, and Leslie beats him up—Nancy wants them to stay and offers them help. This experience has given Nancy the excitement she craves, and she ensures that it continues.

=== Leslie ===
Leslie is the male lizard who appears at the end of act I. Like Charlie, Leslie is a bit more fearful, defensive, and mistrusting than his mate. It is he who first watches the human couple. Leslie is also the first to approach Nancy and Charlie, poking them in the side. When Charlie does not reply right away, Leslie becomes frustrated. While Leslie's guard remains high, especially around Charlie, for most of the play, he is also curious, much more so than his human male counterpart.

Both Leslie and Sarah speak English, though they do not understand many words and concepts of human life. Leslie does not know what emotions are, what cooking or clothing is, or what the names of limbs are. When Nancy tries to shake hands with him, he is completely unfamiliar with and mistrustful of the process. Though Leslie wants to understand for the most part, he becomes impatient when the humans cannot easily explain complex things like love or consciousness.

Though Leslie does not possess or understand some human ideas like love, he does have prejudices against others. Charlie tries and fails to explain what bigotry is to the lizard after Leslie speaks badly of fish. Leslie thinks they are dirty and too numerous. He also looks down on humans because they do not lay eggs. Yet Leslie also has some empathy for the humans. Leslie knows that he and Sarah must look odd to Charlie and Nancy. He also understands that Charlie is being difficult when Nancy mentions that her husband thinks they are dead and that this situation is some sort of hallucination.

Leslie acts most often on instinct, like an animal. When birds and jets fly overhead, he runs to find an escape route. Leslie is very protective of Sarah. When Charlie hurts Sarah—asking her what she would do if Leslie left and never came back—Leslie attacks him. After hitting him, Leslie nearly chokes him until the females intercede. After the incident, Leslie decides that he and Sarah will go back into the sea, to escape this threat. When Nancy tells him that they will have to come back eventually and offers them help, it is Leslie who accepts this fate.

=== Sarah ===
Sarah is the female half of the lizard couple, the mate of Leslie. Like her mate, Sarah is cautious and fearful around the humans. Yet like Nancy, she is curious about them and tries to make a connection. Though Sarah defers to Leslie much more than Nancy does to Charlie, she does play a buffer role between the couples. Leslie often consults Sarah on what he should do and what she thinks about the humans and the situation at hand. At first, Sarah urges wanness, but she also emphasizes the importance of contact.

Though Sarah is more deferential than Nancy, she does assert herself to Leslie when an experience is important. For example, she insists on accompanying Leslie when he approaches the humans in act II after they have taken their submissive pose. Sarah wants to see everything for herself. Most of the new things she encounters intrigue her: the handshakes; Nancy's breasts; human gestation; and the birds flying above them, among other things. But she is also fearful. The jets frighten her, as does Charlie when he asks her what she would do if Leslie went away and never came back. Like Leslie, Sarah does not grasp many human concepts like emotions and nonaquatic animals, though she tries.

Sarah is also more open to explaining their way of life to the humans than her husband is. Leslie tries to curb her, but Sarah says what she believes she should say. Sarah does not fully share Leslie's prejudices and tries to make the humans understand her. For example, Sarah shares information on their reproduction and how she and Leslie met. It is also Sarah who tells the humans why they decided to come out of the sea. Leslie is reluctant to part with this information.

After Charlie asks a question that makes her cry, Sarah wants to go back into the sea. Leslie agrees with her. Later, Sarah intercedes when Leslie tries to beat up Charlie over it. Though Sarah wants to return to their home, Leslie decides, with Nancy's help, to stay.

== Themes ==
=== Communication and understanding ===
At the thematic center of Seascape are issues related to communication and understanding. Though all of the characters speak English, when each of the four tries to communicate with the others, only varied success is achieved. The theme of communication takes on several forms in the play.

First, there is the communication between each member of a couple with their respective mate. Nancy tries to engage her husband, Charlie, in a mutually beneficial discussion about her needs and their future, but he derides her ideas. Nancy wants to explore and be adventurous in their retirement, while Charlie wants to rest and do nothing. Throughout the play, their inability to communicate and understand each other's wants and needs creates tension and hostility.

Leslie and Sarah have fewer problems communicating. Leslie is dominant in their relationship, and Sarah is generally content to play a subservient role. Leslie consults Sarah on most decisions and generally respects her input. Sarah speaks up when she feels Leslie is acting inappropriately, and Leslie usually listens.

The other significant form of communication is between the two couples and is different between the genders. Nancy is very curious about and open with the lizards. Though she does become slightly frustrated by their limitations, she tries to help them by explaining aspects of human life they do not understand. Her general kindness toward them and offer of help when the lizards are deciding whether to stay on land or to go back to the sea influences their decision. Charlie is less forthcoming and more suspicious. He has a hard time accepting the lizards and quickly becomes testy when they do not understand his explanations.

The lizards' communication is somewhat similar to their human counterparts. Like Nancy, Sarah is more open to the humans and more interested in their world. She is also emotional, and when Charlie asks her a question that is hard for her to understand (what she would do if Leslie disappeared), she becomes distraught, leading to a confrontation. Leslie shares Charlie's attitude; he does not trust the humans and regards most everything they say with skepticism. Despite these problems, at the end of the play, some measure of trust is reached between all of them. Leslie decides that he and Sarah will stay on land when Nancy and Charlie, albeit reluctantly, offer to help them.

=== Evolution and progress ===
Another prominent theme in Seascape is that of evolution and progress. This theme manifests itself in several ways in the play. One is subtle. The relationship of Nancy and Charlie is in the process of evolution. They are on the verge of a major life change, retirement. Charlie would like to use this time to rest and do nothing. Nancy sees this desire as regression rather than evolution. Her family responsibilities fulfilled, Nancy wants to explore the world, perhaps moving from beach to beach, meeting new people and having new experiences. The couple's relationship will change, and Nancy tries to move it forward. Charlie wants things to stay the same.

Evolution has a different meaning in terms of the lizards. Leslie and Sarah are literally evolving. They were creatures that lived in the sea but apparently developed beyond their species. They were compelled to move to the land, though they do not really understand why. Though Leslie and Sarah are somewhat fearful of the change, they do accept the help that Nancy, enthusiastically, and Charlie, reluctantly, give them. At the end of the play, rather than go back into the sea where they might feel safer, they remain on land.

=== Alienation ===
A more subtle undercurrent in Seascape is the idea of alienation. In terms of this play, to be alienated means to feel withdrawn or exist in an unfriendly environment. Alienation was one of the reasons that Leslie and Sarah left the sea. In act II, Sarah tells the humans, "It wasn't ... comfortable anymore. I mean after all, you make your nest, and accept a whole ... array ... of things ... and ... we didn' t feel we belonged there anymore." It could be argued that this alienation was a step in their evolution. Nancy and, to some degree, Charlie also feel alienated in their lives. In act I, Nancy describes several ways in which she feels alienated, mostly in her relationship with Charlie. She does not share his views on what their life was, is, and could be; she wants to do more than retire. Though not as vocal, Charlie, in turn, feels alienated from her because of her curiosity and her desires. The strains caused by alienation affect the direction of the characters and the action of the play.

== Style ==
=== Setting ===
Seascape is set on a beach in a time contemporary with the writing of the play. Though it is unstated in the text, several critics have assumed that the action takes place somewhere on the east coast of the United States. All of the play is confined to one afternoon. This physical setting emphasizes the transitional state of the characters' lives. It is one of many symbols in the play.

=== Fantasy ===
There is critical debate over exactly what genre of play Seascape is. Some believe it is a comedy, while others see it as absurdist, satirical, or allegorical. Most agree that an element of fantasy is involved. While Nancy and Charlie are humans and act accordingly, Leslie and Sarah are fantastic creations. They are human-sized lizards that have left their life in the sea to live on land. They speak perfect English and understand some aspects of human life. Charlie has a hard time accepting that they are real. He wants to believe that he and Nancy see them because they are suffering from food poisoning or are dead. In terms of the play Leslie and Sarah are very real, a fact that Nancy immediately grasps and embraces. The fantasy aspect of the play creates dramatic irony and allows issues such as progress, values, and differences to be discussed.

=== Symbolism ===
Many symbols are employed by Albee to underscore the action and themes of Seascape. The most obvious symbols are the lizard characters, Leslie and Sarah. Because these are anthropomorphic creatures (that is, animals with human qualities), they can be used to illustrate Albee's ideas about humans and their relationships. Leslie and Sarah represent many things, including a literal depiction of evolution and progress and an ideal of a relationship that works in stark contrast to Nancy and Charlie's relationship.

The setting is symbolic. The beach—where land and sea meet—represents a place of transition. In earth's distant history creatures emerged from the sea to live on land, as Leslie and Sarah do in the course of the play. Changes for all four characters are taking place at the beach. Another symbol is the jet planes that zoom overhead. The jets are a mixed symbol. They are described to Sarah as the mechanical evolution of the seagulls that fascinate her. Yet Charlie worries that a jet will one day crash into the dune—a temporary if not symbolic end to evolution. The jets also scare both Sarah and Leslie. But the jets continue to fly and never crash, and the lizards decide to embrace their own evolution. Though feared by everyone but Nancy in Seascape, positive change holds as a symbolic theme of the play.

== Awards and nominations ==
=== Original Broadway production ===
Year	Award	Category	Nominee	Result
1975	Tony Award	Best Play		Nominated
1975	Tony Award	Best Featured Actor in a Play	Frank Langella	Won
1975	Tony Award	Best Lighting Design	James Tilton	Nominated
1975	Drama Desk Award	Outstanding Play		Nominated
1975	Drama Desk Award	Outstanding Featured Actor in a Play	Frank Langella	Won
1975	Drama Desk Award	Outstanding Featured Actress in a Play	Maureen Anderman	Nominated
1975	Drama Desk Award	Outstanding Costume Design	Fred Voelpel	Nominated
1975	Pulitzer Prize	Drama	Edward Albee	Won

=== 2005 Broadway revival ===
Year	Award	Category	Nominee	Result
2006	Tony Award	Best Revival of a Play		Nominated
2006	Tony Award	Best Costume Design of a Play	Catherine Zuber	Nominated
2006	Drama Desk Award	Outstanding Scenic Design of a Play	Michael Yeargan	Nominated
