= A Cry of Players =

- Written by: William Gibson
- Original language: English
- Genre: Drama
- Setting: Obscure town in England in the 1580s

Premiere
- Date premiered: November 14, 1968
- Place premiered: Repertory Theatre, Lincoln Center; New York City

A Cry of Players is a drama by William Gibson, first performed in 1968, that portrays the young adult life of William Shakespeare. The title comes from Hamlet, spoken by the aforementioned, Act 3, Scene 2: "Would not this, sir, and a forest of feathers-- if the rest of my fortunes turn Turk with me--with two provincial roses on my razed shoes, get me a fellowship in a cry of players, sir?"

== Productions ==
The original production opened on July 24, 1968 at the Berkshire Theatre Festival in Stockbridge, Massachusetts. The show was directed by Gene Frankel.

The show transferred to Broadway to the Repertory Theatre, Lincoln Center and premiered on November 14, 1968. The crew was made up by set design David Hays, costume design Patricia Quinn Stewart, and lighting design John Gleason. Frankel would also direct. Understudies were Ruth Attaway (Meg), Frank Bayer (Arthur), James Cook (Kemp), Leslie Graves (Susanna), Douglas Hayle (Heming), Robert Levine (Richards, Gilbert, Berry), Marilyn Lightstone (Anne), Robert Molock (Pope), William Myers (Hodges, Roche, Old John), Robert Phalen (Will), Robert Stattel (Sandells), and Barbette Tweed (Jenny). The show played in repertoire with William Shakespeare's King Lear.

=== Original production casts ===
Character	Off-Broadway	Broadway
William Shakespeare	Frank Langella	Frank Langella
Fulk	Michael Egan	Michael Egan
Meg	Lois Kibbee	Rosetta LeNoire
Anne Hathaway	Anne Bancroft	Anne Bancroft
Richards	Robert Donley	Ray Fry
Susanna Hall	Jackie Paris	Jackie Paris
Kemp	Dan Morgan	Robert Symonds
Sir Thomas	William Roerick	Stephen Elliott
Ned	Peter Galman	René Auberjonois
Berry	Brendan Fay	Brendan Fay
Sandells	Bill Moor	Bill Moor
Roche	Ray Stewart	Ray Stewart
Jenny	Flora Elkins	Susan Tyrrell
Hodges	Jerome Dempsey	Jerome Dempsey
Heming	Tom Sawyer	Tom Sawyer
Arthur	Terrence Hall	Kristoffer Tabori
Old John	Don McHenry	Don McHenry
Gilbert Shakespeare	Jess Osuna	Ronald Weyand
Pope	N/A	Gerry Black

== Plot ==
The plot is a fictionalized or dramatized version of William Shakespeare's young adult life.

== Reception ==
Clive Barnes, the theatre critic for the New York Times, gave a mixed review, stating "'A Cry Of Players' and a clique of cliches -- there was much that was wrong with William Gibson's new play given by the Lincoln Center Repertory Company at the Vivian Beaumont Theater last night, but there was also much that was right."
