= The Odd Life of Timothy Green (soundtrack) =

2012 film soundtrack album

The Odd Life of Timothy Green (An Original Walt Disney Records Soundtrack)

Soundtrack album by Geoff Zanelli
- Released: August 14, 2012
- Recorded: 2012
- Studios: Eastwood Scoring Stage, Warner Bros. Studios, Burbank, California; Remote Control Productions, Santa Monica, California
- Genre: Film score
- Length: 48:33
- Label: Walt Disney
- Producer: Geoff Zanelli
- Compiler: Phil Boucher

Geoff Zanelli chronology
Beneath the Darkness (2011)	The Odd Life of Timothy Green (2012)	You May Not Kiss the Bride (2012)

The Odd Life of Timothy Green (An Original Walt Disney Records Soundtrack) is the soundtrack album to the 2012 fantasy comedy-drama film The Odd Life of Timothy Green directed by Peter Hedges starring CJ Adams as the titular character, alongside Jennifer Garner and Joel Edgerton amongst other cast members. The album featured 24 tracks from the original score composed by Geoff Zanelli and was released through Walt Disney Records on August 14, 2012.

== Development ==
Geoff Zanelli composed the film score for The Odd Life of Timothy Green. While watching the first edit of the film, Zanelli considered to have an acoustic and organic instrumentation, which prompted to think about folksy instruments, and the score had to be tied with the story, and felt the film would be best served with a thematic approach. Here, "Life Goes On" is two themes that recurringly appear for Timothy, his parents and Joni's as well, and Joni's theme was designed to work in hand with Timothy's theme, which Zanelli needed to weave it to together. Zanelli was further infulenced by the cinematography which led to him providing a variety of colors for the score. While previous of Hedges' film had incorporated songs, the director wanted to have a traditional score, as he needed to communicate with the world and children, there providing intimate and ecletic sounds as well as approaching these pieces as a song.

Zanelli utilized a variety of instruments like the hammered dulcimer, lap dulcimer, ukulele, mandolin, accordion, upright bass, celeste, and objects such as wine glasses, prayer bowls, tin whistles and recorders, in addition to the strings, piano and guitar, and did not use any synthesizers, except for the mellotron which was a mechanical instrument, operating like a synthesizer, and dulcitone, a keyboard instrument similar to celeste, with a wooden sound. Zanelli found two such instruments in Los Angeles, but as neither of them were not functional, the keyboardist Randy Kerber, had to play half the notes on one and half of the other to get the sound right. He also tried to do musically with the sound of sigh, which provided a low-pitch humming for a solemn, subtle quality for the scene where the couple hear that they could not conceive a child. This humming was the primary element of the vocals in the score. The other element being Sarah Rollins, whose voice was folky and had an innocent and purity which served to accent Timothy. To depict the place called Stanleyville, which was known for having a large pencil factory, Zanelli used pencils as percussive elements and experimented it musically, through pencils hitting pencils, or drumming on the back of the guitar or rhythmically scratching across a sheet of paper.

Zanelli felt that the music for Timothy Green, was stemmed from his personal experience from fatherhood, as he would try to find elements that could connect him personally. He recalled about their first interaction from Hedges, regarding on how this film is about children can teach the parents if they allow them. This prompted him to write from the own perspective as a father witnessing his daughter interact with the world, and an interest she had, appreciating her beauty. These were the things, he tried to channelize into the music, the performances and the recording. Zanelli recalled that this score was the first she responded to, recalling that when he played a few notes of his score from the film, she would shout "Timothy Green!" and come running over, which he considered an heartfelt moment.

== Critical reception ==
Jonathan Broxton of Movie Music UK wrote "Despite never leaving a truly lasting impression, The Odd Life of Timothy Green is at least a pleasing diversion, undemanding, enjoyable, and tuneful in a way that far too few modern film scores are these days." Peter Debruge of Variety wrote "Propelled by Geoff Zanelli's stirring score, which blends folk instruments with human voices and natural sounds, Hedges' treatment of the supernatural is easy to accept, and these interruptions help to put the pic's magical realism in perspective." Justin Craig of Fox News called it "a charmingly magical and folksy score by Geoff Zanelli". Jamie Neish of HeyUGuys wrote "It's all soundtracked to shuddersome effect by Geoff Zanelli's cloying musical accompaniments." Scorekeeper of Ain't It Cool News ranked it as one of the best scores of 2012, saying: "A score this emotionally complex and precise is rare. Upon first listen, it may sound overly simplistic. The greatest scores usually do [...] Zanelli's music masterfully captures the kaleidoscopic array of conflicting emotions peppered throughout the narrative."

== Track listing ==
Track listing
No.	Title	Length
1.	"You're Gonna Find It Hard to Believe"	1:22
2.	"Life Goes On"	3:18
3.	"That's Not Normal"	4:23
4.	"Our Kid"	1:19
5.	"...Now What?"	2:25
6.	"Is He for Us?"	1:31
7.	"Cherry on Top"	0:56
8.	"I Can Only Get Better! (A Glass Half Full Person)"	1:17
9.	"Love and Be Loved"	2:43
10.	"There's Something You Need to See"	1:46
11.	"Funny, Like Uncle Bob"	2:06
12.	"Why Not Make a New Kind of Pencil?"	2:20
13.	"Nice Socks"	1:09
14.	"Picasso with a Pencil"	1:18
15.	"Run the Other Way"	0:24
16.	"This World They Created"	1:09
17.	"Think "Tree""	1:45
18.	"The Championship Game"	1:47
19.	"I'm with "0""	4:32
20.	"The Winning Goal"	2:04
21.	"I Let Her Go"	1:22
22.	"We Better Get Inside"	2:25
23.	"Never Give Up"	1:44
24.	"So Much Is Possible"	3:28
Total length:		48:33

== Personnel ==
Credits adapted from liner notes:

- Music composer and producer – Geoff Zanelli
- Arrangements and programming – Phill Boucher
- Compiler – Phill Boucher
- Engineer – Christian Wenger, Daniel Kresco, Lori Castro, Tom Hardisty
- Recording and mixing – Dennis Sands
- Digital recordist – Adam Olmsted
- Mastering – Pat Sullivan
- Score editor – Jay Richardson, Sally Boldt
- Music supervisor – Dana Sano
- Creative director – Steve Gerdes
- Executive producer – Peter Hedges
- Copyist – Booker White, Walt Disney Music Library
- Album design – Steve Sterling
- Music business and legal affairs – Don Welty, Scott Holtzman
- Executive in charge of music – Mitchell Leib
- Production manager – Monica Zierhut

Orchestra

- Supervising orchestrator – Bruce Fowler
- Orchestrators – Carl Rydlund, Elizabeth Finch, Kevin Kaska, Rick Giovinazzo, Walter Fowler
- Conductor – Nick Glennie-Smith
- Concertmaster – Belinda Broughton

Featured musicians

- Featured musicians – Atli Örvarsson, Bryce Jacobs, Chris Bleth, Geoff Zanelli, George Doering, Mike Shapiro, Randy Kerber, Steve Erdody, Thom Rotella, Tim Lefebvre
- Featured vocals – Sarah Rollins

Orchestra musicians

- Bass – David Parmeter, Michael Valerio, Nico Abondolo, Timothy Lefebvre
- Cello – Armen Ksajikian, Cecelia Tsan, Christina Soule, Dane Little, Dennis Karmazyn, Erika Duke-Kirkpatrick, George Kim Scholes, John Walz, Paula Hochhalter, Trevor Handy
- Viola – Alma Fernandez, Brian Dembow, Carolyn Riley, Darrin McCann, David Walther, Jennie Hansen, Keith Greene, Mathew Funes, Pamela Jacobson
- Violin – Alyssa Park, Amy Hershberger, Belinda Broughton, Bruce Dukov, Darius Campo, Eun-Mee Ahn, Eve Butler, Grace Oh, Helen Nightengale, Irina Voloshina, Joel Pargman, Josefina Vergara, Julie Gigante, Lorand Lokuszta, Natalie Leggett, Neil Samples, Phillip Levy, Radu Pieptea, Roberto Cani, Roger Wilkie, Sara Parkins, Shalini Vijayan, Sid Page, Tereza Stanislav
