= Paulescu =

Paulescu is a patronymic surname of Romanian origin. Notable people with the surname include:

- Dumitru Pavelescu-Dimo (1870-1944), Romanian sculptor
- Gheorghe Pavelescu (1915-2008), Romanian ethnologist and folklorist
- George Pavelescu, birth name of George Drumur (1911-1992), writer, publicist, musicologist and translator
- Nicolae Paulescu (1869–1931), Romanian physiologist, independent discoverer of insulin
- Sam Paulescu (born 1984), American football punter
