= Scott Sanders (producer) =

American TV, film and theatre producer

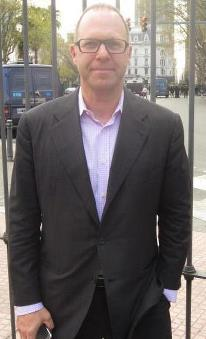
- Sanders in 2012
- Born: 1957 (age 68–69); Baltimore, Maryland, U.S.
- Education: University of Florida
- Occupations: Television producer, theatrical producer and film producer
- Spouse: Brad Lamm (m. 2008)

Scott Sanders (born 1957) is an American television producer, film producer and theatre producer. His theatrical musical version of Alice Walker's novel The Color Purple, for which he was a lead producer alongside co-producers Oprah Winfrey and Quincy Jones, premiered on Broadway in 2005, garnering 11 Tony Award Nominations including Best Musical.

He also produced the 2016 Broadway revival of The Color Purple which went on to win the Tony Award for Best Revival of a Musical and the Grammy Award for Best Musical Theatre Album. He won his Emmy and first Tony Award for his work as the producer of Elaine Stritch at Liberty. His musical comedy adaptation of the film Tootsie premiered on Broadway to positive reviews in the Spring of 2019. He is also known for his impresario role at Radio City Music Hall and for his work on numerous globally televised live events, including the Super Bowl XXVII halftime show starring Michael Jackson at the Rose Bowl in Pasadena, CA.

== Early life ==
Sanders grew up in St. Petersburg, Florida and was a 1975 graduate of Gibbs High School in Pinellas County, Florida, which at the time was undergoing court-ordered desegregation, and to which he was bused. He was Class President at Gibbs. He is a 1979 graduate of the University of Florida. During college he worked as an intern in the advertising department of the St. Petersburg Times.

== Career ==
Sanders began his career at Radio City Music Hall in New York, producing artists including Aretha Franklin, Marvin Gaye, Whitney Houston, K.D. Lang, Madonna, Bette Midler, Richard Pryor, Lionel Richie, Liza Minnelli, Paul Simon, Frank Sinatra, Tina Turner, Liberace, Sting, Diana Ross, and The Grateful Dead. He was Executive Producer there for 15 years and has been credited with reversing the venue's steady decline after its near-bankruptcy in 1978 and turning it into one of the highest grossing theaters in the world. For Radio City Music Hall Productions, Sanders also produced rock concerts and popular cultural events outside of the venue including Penn and Teller's NBC special Don't Try This At Home, and inaugural anniversary gala for President Bill Clinton and the historic 1993 Super Bowl halftime show starring Michael Jackson on NBC.

It was 1993 that Sanders' bold reformatting of the Super Bowl XXVII halftime show, starring Jackson, raised NBC's halftime rating higher than the Super Bowl action before it. Sanders' reconstituted show is credited with transforming the way the NFL presents its halftime entertainment. In the years since, the NFL has, at every single Super Bowl, followed the model Sanders & Jackson created in 1993 enlisting big-name, contemporary, broad-appeal artists to perform during halftime in an effort to keep viewers from straying. He made his first foray into Broadway while still at Radio City, producing An Evening with Harry Connick, Jr. and his Orchestra in 1990. He returned to Broadway as an independent producer in 2002 with Elaine Stritch at Liberty. Other Broadway work includes Dame Edna Back with a Vengeance (2004), The Color Purple (2005), The Pee-wee Herman Show (2010), Evita (2012), After Midnight (2013) and the Color Purple revival (2015). In 1996, Sanders co-founded Mandalay Television, along with Mandalay Entertainment Chairman Peter Guber. and executive produced six network series, including include Young Americans, Cupid, Mercy Point, and Rude Awakening. In 2001, Sanders launched Creative Battery, a multimedia production company in partnership with AEG presents, which was responsible for solo Broadway shows by Elaine Stritch and the Barry Humphries character Dame Edna. While at Creative Battery, Sanders also served Executive Producer for Queen Latifah's jazz album, The Dana Owens Album, which received a 2005 Grammy Award nomination for Best Jazz Vocal Album

In 2007 he founded Scott Sanders Productions, a film and theatrical production company based in New York City with funding for theatrical ventures from a private equity group which includes New England Patriots owner Robert Kraft, Roy Furman, and Jim Fantaci. On the film side, Scott Sanders Productions entered into a five-year first-look feature deal with Disney. In August 2012, the company signed a subsequent five-year deal with Sony Pictures Entertainment to develop and produce live versions of Sony films. Sanders and Ahmet Zappa co-produced a film written and directed by Peter Hedges, The Odd Life of Timothy Green, released by Walt Disney Pictures on August 15, 2012.

In August 2012 Sony Pictures Entertainment and Sanders agreed to mount stage productions of Sony films and announced that Tootsie, the 1982 comedy starring Dustin Hoffman, would be the first project.

In September 2016, Sanders was named the creative head of global entertainment for Westfield Corporation, which confirmed its acquisition of Scott Sanders Productions.

In October 2018, he relaunched Scott Sanders Productions as an independent theatre, film, television, music, live-event and experiential entertainment production company, with offices in New York and Los Angeles. Sanders serves as president and CEO.

In November 2018, Warner Bros. announced the development of a film adaptation of the Color Purple musical, co-produced by Oprah Winfrey, Steven Spielberg, Quincy Jones, and Sanders.

=== TOOTSIE (stage musical) ===
The new comedy musical Tootsie opened its pre-Broadway world premiere engagement at Chicago's Cadillac Palace Theatre on September 30, 2018. Critics, in widely positive reviews, praised the contemporary updates that the stage musical's creative team have made to the 1982 movie comedy. Variety wrote, "This bouncy musical turns the story into a full-on satire of the narcissistic male ego.

=== In the Heights (film) ===
In 2013, Sanders and Mara Jacobs began working on a film adaptation of Lin-Manuel Miranda's musical In the Heights, with a script written by Quiara Alegría Hudes, who authored the book for the original stage version.

In 2018, Sanders, along with co-producers Jacobs, Miranda and Anthony Bregman, closed a $50 million deal with Warner Bros. for the film rights. The property has been the subject of a hot auction after it was extracted from The Weinstein Company ahead of its bankruptcy. Jon M. Chu is directing the movie and also helmed Warner's Crazy Rich Asians.

Sanders and Miranda previously worked together on The Odd Life of Timothy Green.

=== The Color Purple (stage musical) ===
Sanders first approached author Alice Walker about adapting her Pulitzer Prize-winning novel into a stage musical in 1997. The project took over eight years to release, partly due to Walker's reluctance to give permission for the adaptation of her. Sanders eventually persuaded Walker to give her permission and support after telling her that he thought that it had similarities to Fiddler on the Roof – "a community of people that the audience would follow over time".

The Color Purple, which premiered at the Alliance Theatre in Atlanta and opened on the Broadway at the Broadway Theatre in December 2005, had an all-black cast and Oprah Winfrey as an investor and producer. The production was noted for its contribution to a "redefinition of the Broadway crowd," a reference to its ability to attract a multi-racial audience. Later, Sanders would describe the work of producing a musical as "wrestling an octopus, keeping all the puppies in the box," and the hardest thing he had ever done, "more white-knuckle than I'd like, and the most fun I'd ever had."

The Original Broadway production garnered 11 Tony Award nominations, including Best Musical. Its original star, LaChanze, won the 2006 Tony Award for Leading Actress in a Musical. Later in the run, Sanders hired Fantasia, an American Idol winner, to take over the lead role. The London production at Menier Chocolate Factory, directed by John Doyle, was co-produced by Sanders, Winfrey and Roy Furman and ran from July to September 2013. On January 9, 2015, producers Sanders, Furman, and Winfrey announced that the Menier Chocolate Factory production would be mounted as a Broadway revival, with Jennifer Hudson making her Broadway debut in the role of Shug Avery, Danielle Brooks playing the role of Sofia, and Cynthia Erivo, reprising the role as Celie. Previews began November 10, 2015, with the official opening December 10 at the Bernard B. Jacobs Theatre. Cynthia Erivo won the 2016 Tony Award for best performance by a Leading Actress in a Musical. The production won the 2016 Tony Award for Best Revival of a Musical.

=== After Midnight (stage musical) ===
Sanders, along with jazz legend Wynton Marsalis, produced After Midnight, a reimagined Broadway production of City Center Encores' Cotton Club Parade, which premiered in November 2013 and closed in June 2014. The show received 7 Tony Award nominations, including Best Musical. Warren Carlyle won the Tony Award for Best Choreography. Over the course of its run on Broadway, the production featured a rotating array of special guest stars, including Fantasia Barrino, k.d. lang, Toni Braxton with Babyface, Vanessa Williams, and Patti LaBelle. The production was also notable in that it marked the famed fashion world duo, Isabel and Ruben Toledo, designed and created costumes for a Broadway musical.

=== The Odd Life of Timothy Green (film) ===
The Odd Life of Timothy Green, a 2012 Walt Disney Pictures film co-written and directed by Peter Hedges, was co-produced by Sanders and opened in U.S. theaters on August 15, 2012. Based on a concept by Ahmet Zappa, the fantasy film is about a magical pre-adolescent boy whose personality and naïveté have profound effects on the people in his town. The film starred Jennifer Garner, Joel Edgerton, and CJ Adams, and also marked the feature film acting debut of Lin-Manuel Miranda.

=== Evita (stage musical) ===
Sanders, along with co-lead producer Hal Luftig, produced the first Broadway revival of Andrew Lloyd Webber's Evita, which opened at the Marquis Theatre on April 5, 2012. The production starred Argentinian sensation Elena Roger and pop superstar Ricky Martin. The production garnered three Tony Award nominations, including Best Revival of a Musical.

=== The Pee-Wee Herman Show (stage play) ===
Sanders served as lead producer on The Pee-Wee Herman Show, the stage play starring Paul Reubens as Pee-wee Herman and featuring the entire Playhouse cast of characters. It opened at Los Angeles Club Nokia on January 12, 2010. After receiving strong reviews in Los Angeles, Sanders brought the show to Broadways Stephen Sondheim Theatre, where it opened to more critical praise on November 11, 2010.

=== Elaine Stritch at Liberty (stage play) ===
Sanders served as co-lead producer, with John Schreiber, on Elaine Stritch at Liberty, the autobiographical one-woman show starring Elaine Stritch, written by Stritch and John Lahr, and directed by George C.Wolfe. The show premiered on Broadway, at the Neil Simon Theatre, on February 21, 2002, going on to win the 2002 Tony Award for Best Special Theatrical Event. Following its successful Broadway run, Sanders produced a ten-city tour of the production as well as an HBO documentary of the stage show. The HBO film won two 2004 Emmy Awards, including Outstanding Variety, Music or Comedy Special.

== Awards and nominations ==
Sanders has won three Tony Awards, an Emmy Award, and a Grammy Award. He won his first Tony Award for Best Special Theatrical Event in 2002 for Elaine Stritch at Liberty.

In 2004 Sanders won a Primetime Emmy Award for Outstanding Variety, Music, or Comedy Special for "Elaine Stritch: At Liberty" (2002).

Sanders received a 2005 nomination for Best Jazz Vocal Album for Queen Latifah's The Dana Owens Album, a 2005 nomination for Best Special Theatrical Event for "Dame Edna: Back with a Vengeance", and was nominated in 2002 for a Best Special Theatrical Event for "Elaine Stritch: At Liberty."

In 2006, The Color Purple was nominated for eleven Tony Awards, including Best Musical, Best Performance by a Leading Actress in a Musical, Best Performance by a Featured Actor in a Musical, Best Performance by a Featured Actress in a Musical, Best Choreography, Best Original Score, Best Book of a Musical, Best Costume Design of a Musical, Best Lighting Design of a Play, and Best Lighting Design of a Musical.

In 2012, "Evita" received three Tony nominations, for Best Revival of a Musical, Best Performance by an Actor in a Featured Role in a Musical, and Best Choreography.

After Midnight received seven Tony Award nominations (Best Musical, Best Performance by an Actress in a Featured Role in a Musical, Best Costume Design of a Musical, Best Lighting Design of a Musical, Best Sound Design of a Musical, Best Direction of a Musical and Best Choreography), earning the award for choreography. It also earned three Drama Desk Award nominations (Outstanding Featured Actress in a Musical, Outstanding Choreography and Outstanding Revue, winning in the latter two categories). Of five Outer Critics Circle Awards nominations (Outstanding New Broadway Musical, Outstanding Director of a Musical, Outstanding Choreographer, Outstanding Costume Design and Outstanding Lighting Design), the show won for Outstanding Choreographer. After Midnight was also the most-nominated production at the 2014 Astaire Awards, where it won for Outstanding Male Dancer, Outstanding Female Dancer and Outstanding Choreographer.

Sanders won his second Tony Award as lead producer for Best Musical Revival winner The Color Purple in 2016. He won his third Tony Award as a co-producer for Best Musical Revival winner Company in 2022.

He earned a Grammy Award for Best Musical Theater Album as producer for The Color Purple in 2017.

== Personal life ==
Sanders married author and crisis interventionist Brad Lamm in California in 2008 in a ceremony officiated by Alice Walker, who was ordained by Universal Ministries for the event.
