= Odeya Rush =

Israeli actress (born 1997)

- אודיה רושינק
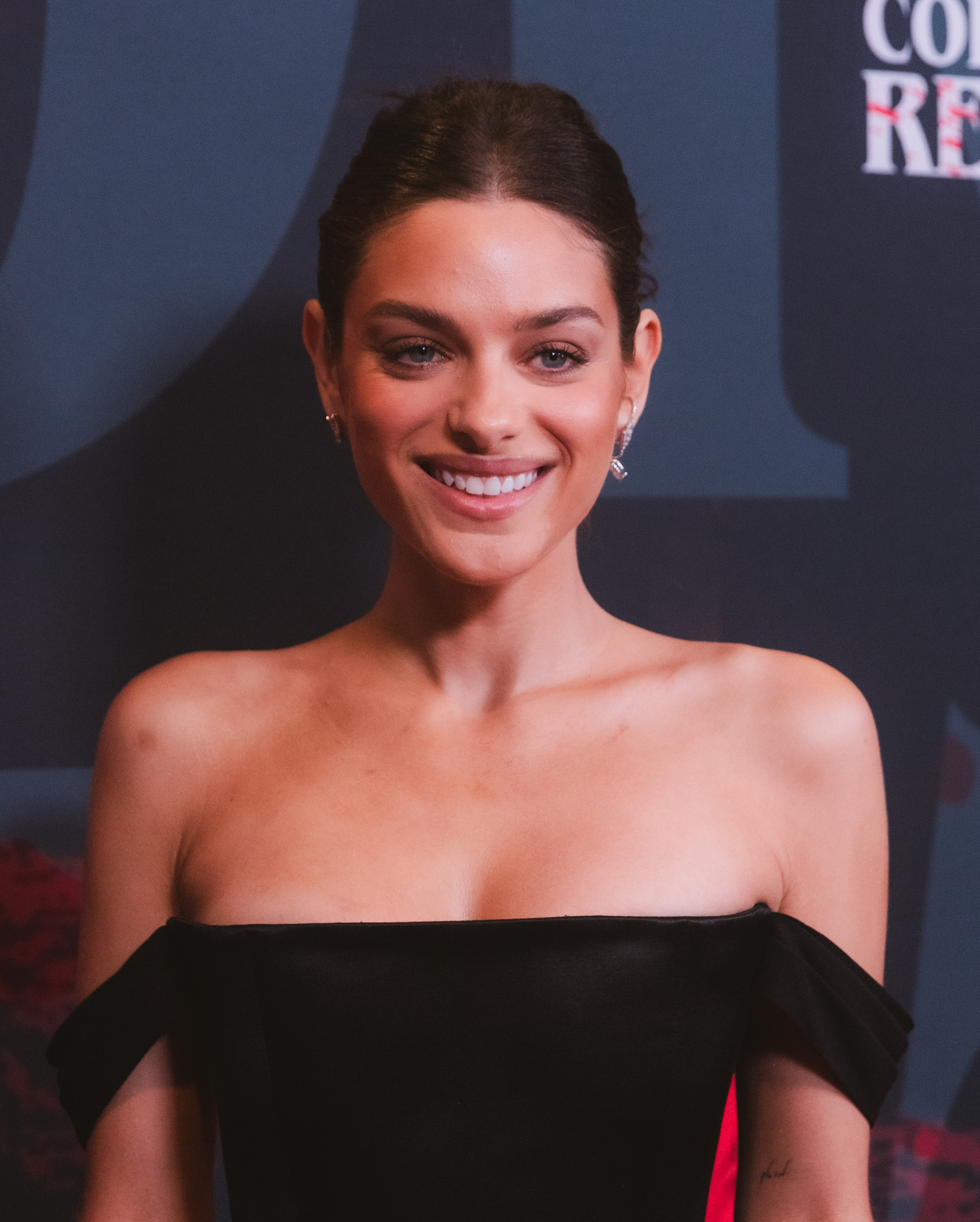
- Rush in 2026
- Born: Odeya Rushinek; 12 May 1997 (age 29); Haifa, Israel
- Occupation: Actress
- Years active: 2009–present

Odeya Rushinek (Hebrew: אודיה רושינק; born 12 May 1997), known professionally as Odeya Rush (אודיה רש), is an Israeli actress based in the United States. She is known for her lead roles in The Giver (2014), Goosebumps (2015), The Bachelors (2017), Lady Bird (2017), Dumplin' (2018), Let It Snow (2019) and Dangerous Waters (2023). In 2026, she began playing the role of Maria in the Fox crime drama Memory of a Killer.

== Early life ==
Rush was born Odeya Rushinek in Haifa, Israel on 12 May 1997 to Jewish parents, Shlomo Rushinek, an Israeli, and Maia (née Greenfeld), who made aliyah from Russia (then the Soviet Union). Her first language is Hebrew, but she also grew up speaking Russian. In Hebrew, her given name means "I will thank God". As an eight-year-old growing up in her hometown of Haifa, Israel, she wrote and performed plays.

Her family moved to the United States when she was nine years old so that her father could take up a job as a security consultant in Alabama. When she arrived, Rush did not know English and could only speak Hebrew and Russian. She attended the N. E. Miles Jewish Day School in Birmingham, Alabama, where she resided; she later moved to Midland Park, New Jersey, where she attended public school.

In the beginning of 2013, Rush moved to Los Angeles with her family. She has six brothers; four of them are younger than her—two sets of twins who reside with their parents in Los Angeles, and two older paternal half-brothers who reside in Israel.

== Career ==
=== Modelling ===
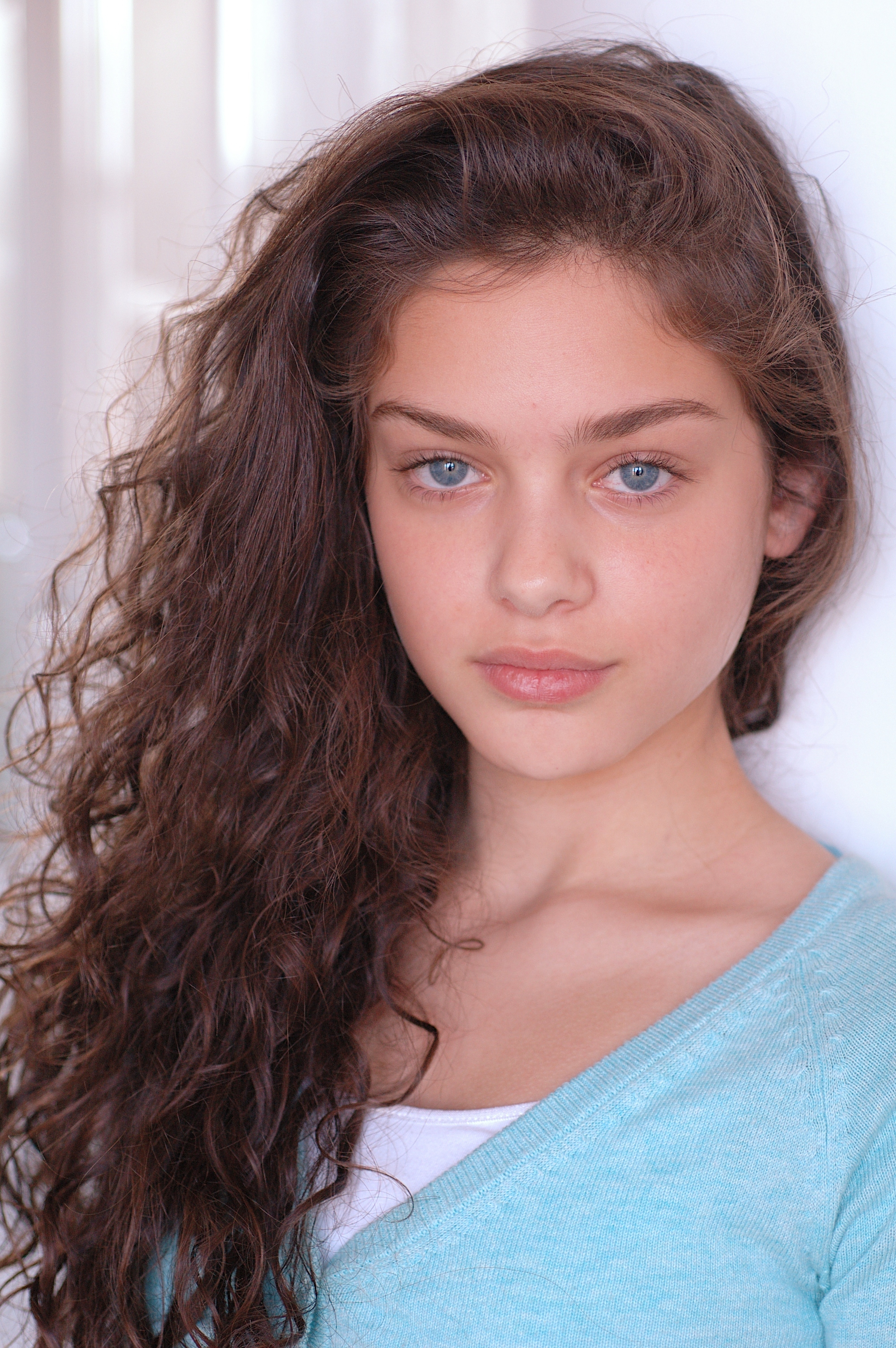
Rush in 2011

Before becoming an actress, Rush began her career in her childhood and adolescence when she was discovered as a model in the United States, appearing in major campaigns and advertisements for fashion brands Polo Ralph Lauren, Gap, Tommy Hilfiger, and H&M.

She also starred in a summer campaign for a collaboration between FILA and Urban Outfitters in 2018.

=== Acting ===
Her first acting roles began in 2010 in Law & Order: Special Victims Unit, in the episode "Branded", in which she played the character Hannah Milner; and in the television series Curb Your Enthusiasm in the episode "Mister Softee", as Emily.

Her first film role was in 2012, playing Joni Jerome, the best friend of Timothy, in the Peter Hedges-directed Disney film The Odd Life of Timothy Green.

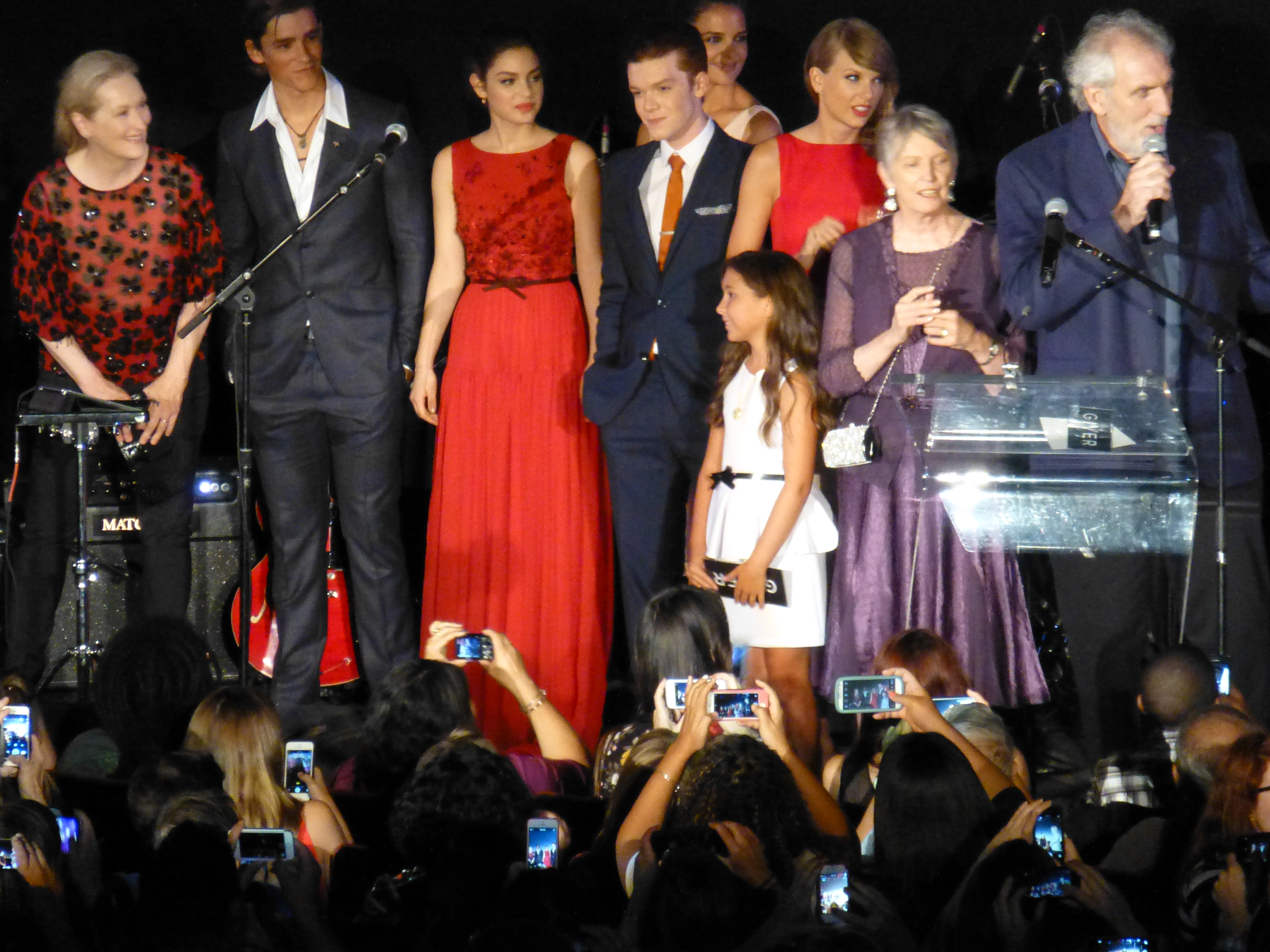
Rush (third from the left) with the cast of The Giver in 2014

Rush co-starred, as Fiona, in the science fiction film The Giver (2014), based on the 1993 novel of same name from Lois Lowry, and directed by Phillip Noyce. The film also starred Brenton Thwaites, Jeff Bridges, Meryl Streep, Katie Holmes, Alexander Skarsgård and Taylor Swift.

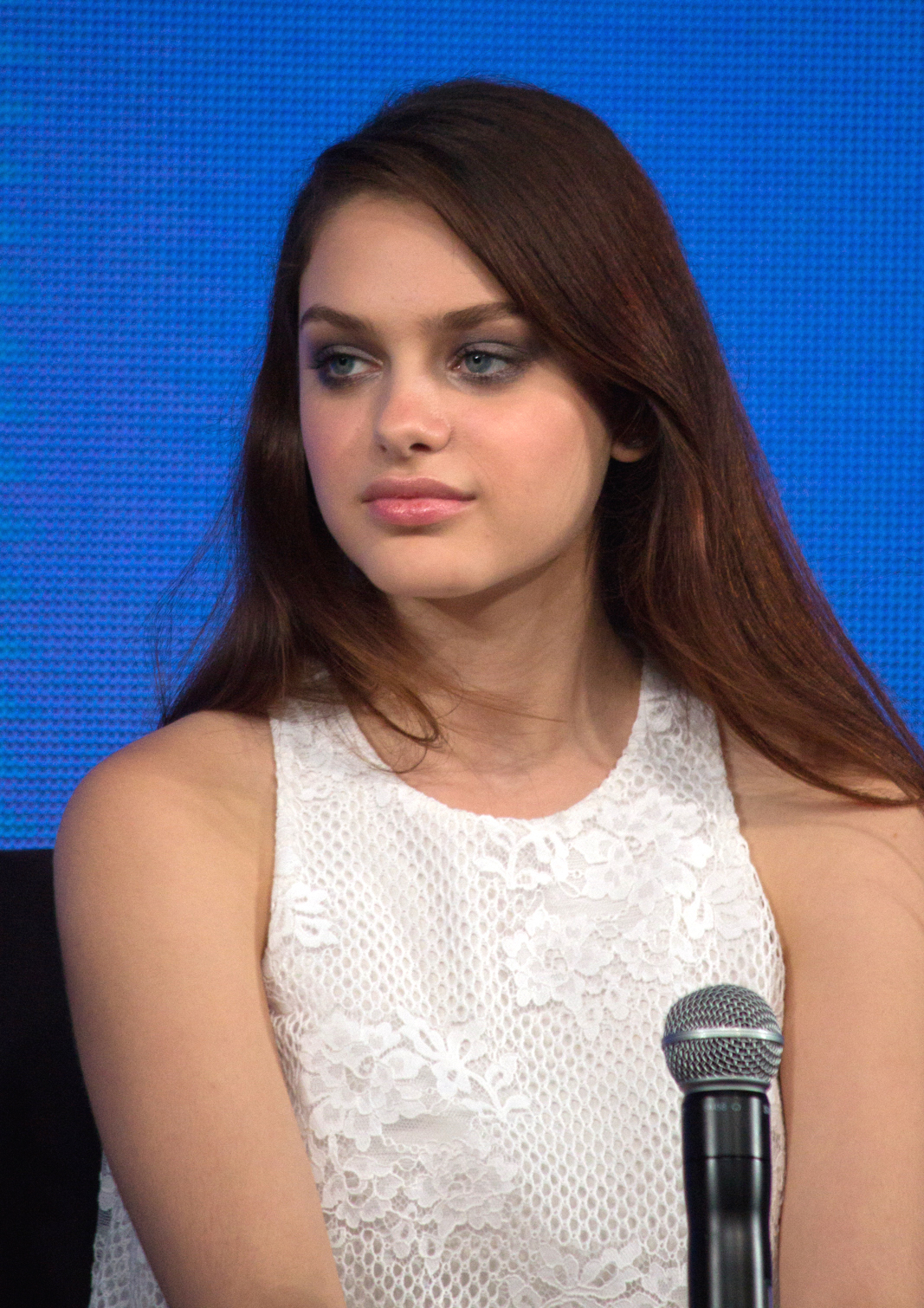
Rush in 2014

In 2015, Rush played Ashley Burwood, niece of Johana Burwood (played by Sarah Hyland), in the comedy film See You in Valhalla. Rush's next role was the female lead in the film Goosebumps, based on the R. L. Stine's popular book series. Rush played Hannah Fairchild, the "daughter" of R. L. Stine (portrayed by Jack Black), who teams up with her neighbor to fight the Goosebumps monsters.

In 2016, Rush completed filming the satirical comedy film Dear Dictator, in which she starred with Michael Caine and Katie Holmes. She was also cast as Ella Hatto, opposite Sam Worthington, in action-thriller film The Hunter's Prayer directed by Jonathan Mostow.

In 2017, she had a supporting role in Greta Gerwig's Lady Bird, which received numerous best ensemble and cast award nominations. In that same year, she also starred in The Bachelors with J. K. Simmons.

In 2021, Rush played the title role in her first Hebrew-language Israeli drama series, Baalat HaChalomot, and, in the following year, she played Macy in the comedy-drama film Cha Cha Real Smooth and River in the supernatural horror film Umma.

== Filmography ==
=== Film ===
Title	Year	Role	Notes
2012	The Odd Life of Timothy Green	Joni Jerome	
2013	We Are What We Are	Alyce Parker	
2014	The Giver	Fiona	
2015	See You in Valhalla	Ashley Burwood	
2015	Goosebumps	Hannah Fairchild	
2016	Almost Friends	Amber	
2017	The Hunter's Prayer	Ella Hatto	
2017	The Bachelors	Lacy Westman	
2017	Lady Bird	Jenna Walton	
2017	When the Devil Comes	Kyra	
2017	Thanks	Maddy	Short film; also director, producer and writer
2018	Dear Dictator	Tatiana Mills	
2018	Dumplin'	Ellen 'Elle' Dryver	
2018	Spinning Man	Joyce Bonner	
2019	Let It Snow	Addie	
2020	Pink Skies Ahead	Stephanie	
2022	Cha Cha Real Smooth	Macy	
2022	Umma	River	
2023	Dangerous Waters	Rose	
2026	Corporate Retreat	Ginger Hayes	
TBA	Goodbye Girl		Post-production
TBA	Stung †	Maya	Post-production

=== Television ===
Year	Title	Role	Notes
2010	Law & Order: Special Victims Unit	Hannah Milner	Episode: "Branded"
2011	Curb Your Enthusiasm	Emily	Episode: "Mister Softee"
2021	בעלת החלומות (Baalat HaChalomot)	Nur / Rose Romano	Title role; Israeli drama (Hebrew)
2022	Pantheon	Samara	Episode: “Pantheon”; voice
2026	Memory of a Killer	Maria	Main role

=== Music videos ===
Year	Title	Artist	Album	Notes
2018	"Rooftops"	Harry Nathan	Songs About Dreams About Her	Also director and writer

== Accolades ==
- 2013: Rush was named one of Hollywood's 20 up and coming young actresses under 20 to watch by The Midwest TV Guys
- 2014: Rush was one of two Israeli actresses, along with Gal Gadot, to be named as Hollywood's newest leading ladies by InStyle magazine

Year	Nominated work	Award / film festival	Category	Result	Ref.
2012	The Odd Life of Timothy Green	The Chambie Awards	Best Actress	Nominated	
2013	The Odd Life of Timothy Green	Young Artist Awards	Best Performance in a Feature Film – Supporting Young Actress	Nominated	
2013	We Are What We Are	The Chambie Awards	Best Actress	Nominated	
2014	Herself	Teen Choice Awards	Olay Fresh Effects Breakout Star Award	Nominated	
2014	The Giver	The Chambie Awards	Best Actress	Nominated	
2016	Goosebumps	Young Artist Awards	Best Performance in a Feature Film – Leading Young Actress (14–21)	Won	
2017	Lady Bird	Detroit Film Critics Society Awards	Best Ensemble	Nominated (Note: Shared with the cast)	
2017	Lady Bird	San Diego Film Critics Society Awards	Best Performance by an Ensemble	Nominated	
2017	Lady Bird	Seattle Film Critics Society Awards	Best Ensemble Cast	Nominated	
2017	Lady Bird	Online Film Critics Society Awards	Best Ensemble	Nominated	
2017	Lady Bird	Florida Film Critics Circle Awards	Best Cast	Nominated	
2017	Lady Bird	Chicago Indie Critics Awards	Best Ensemble Cast	Nominated	
2017	Lady Bird	Georgia Film Critics Association Awards	Best Ensemble	Nominated	
2018	Lady Bird	Online Film & Television Association Awards	Best Ensemble	Runner-up	
2018	Lady Bird	International Cinephile Society Awards	Best Ensemble	Runner-up	
2018	Lady Bird	Columbus Film Critics Association Awards	Best Ensemble	Won	
2018	Lady Bird	Critics' Choice Awards	Best Acting Ensemble	Nominated	
2018	Lady Bird	Screen Actors Guild Awards	Outstanding Performance by a Cast in a Motion Picture	Nominated	
2019	Lady Bird	CinEuphoria Awards	Best Ensemble – International Competition	Won	

== See also ==
- List of Israelis
- Women in Israel
- List of Jewish actors
- List of Jews in the performing arts
