= Maranatha High School =

Location
- 169 South Saint John Avenue; Pasadena, California 91105; United States; 34°08′34″N 118°09′23″W

Information
- Type: Private Co-ed
- Religious affiliation: Christian
- Denomination: Non-denominational
- Established: 1965
- Head teacher: Matthew Ketterling
- Teaching staff: 46.5 (on an FTE basis)
- Enrollment: 530 (2021–2022)
- Student to teacher ratio: 11.4
- Campus size: 10 acres (40,000 m^{2})
- Campus type: midsize city
- Colors: Red, white, blue
- Athletics conference: CIF Southern Section; Olympic League
- Team name: Minutemen
- Website: www.maranathahighschool.org

Maranatha High School is a private, university preparatory Christian school in Pasadena, California.

This co-ed high school opened in 1965. The athletic teams are known as the Minutemen. The school colors are Red, White, and Navy Blue. The school was located in Sierra Madre, California until 2005, when the school moved to its present location at the historic Ambassador College campus in Pasadena. Maranatha celebrated their 60th year in 2025. Since 2024, Dr. Matthew Ketterling has been the head of school.

== Demographics ==
The demographic breakdown of the 530 students enrolled for the 2021-2022 school year was:

- Hispanic – 20%
- White – 38%
- Black – 8.9%
- Asian – 30.2%
- American Indian or Alaskan Native – 0.9%
- Native Hawaiian or Pacific Islander – 0.0%
- Two or More Races – 2%

== Notable alumni ==
- Tyler Dorsey (born 1996), Greek–American basketball player in the Israeli Basketball Premier League
- Jordan Calloway (born ca. 1990), actor
- Dylan Covey (born 1991), professional baseball pitcher for the Boston Red Sox Major league baseball
- Tim Worrell class of 1985, former MLB pitcher with the San Diego Padres
