= The Hunter's Prayer =

2017 film by Jonathan Mostow

- Theatrical release poster
- Directed by: Jonathan Mostow
- Written by: John Brancato Michael Ferris
- Based on: For the Dogs by Kevin Wignall
- Produced by: Tove Christensen; James Costas; Paul Leyden; Navid McIlhargey; Christopher Milburn; Gavin Poolman; Anthony Rhulen; Paul Rock; John Schwarz; Michael Schwarz; Michael Wexler; Sam Worthington
- Starring: Sam Worthington; Odeya Rush; Allen Leech; Amy Landecker; Martin Compston; Verónica Echegui
- Cinematography: José David Montero
- Edited by: Ken Blackwell
- Music by: Federico Jusid
- Production companies: Apollo Media; FilmEngine; Full Clip Productions; Maple Leaf Films; Screen Yorkshire; Vandal Entertainment
- Distributed by: Saban Films
- Release date: June 9, 2017 (United States)
- Running time: 91 minutes
- Countries: United States; Germany; Spain
- Language: English
- Budget: $17 million
- Box office: $236,820

The Hunter's Prayer is a 2017 action crime film directed by Jonathan Mostow, based on the 2004 novel For the Dogs by Kevin Wignall. The film tells about a conflicted hitman helping a young woman to avenge the death of her family. The film stars Sam Worthington, Odeya Rush, Allen Leech, and Amy Landecker. Filming began on August 12, 2014, in Yorkshire, England.

The film had its theatrical release in the United States by Saban Films on June 9, 2017.

== Plot ==
Lucas (Sam Worthington), a drug-addicted former soldier, is in a club looking for Ella Hatto (Odeya Rush). She is attending boarding school in Switzerland. Ella sees Lucas watching her and thinks he has been hired by her father to protect her. Unbeknownst to Ella, her father was preparing to tell the FBI about Richard Addison's (Allen Leech) illegal operations and also stole 25 million dollars from him. Her father and step-mother have been murdered by a hired killer. Addison's gunmen try to kill Ella at the nightclub, but Lucas kills one and helps her escape. He receives a text threatening to kill his family if he doesn't kill Ella. He takes her across the French border.

Lucas calls Addison and he threatens to kill his estranged wife and daughter. Lucas tells Ella that her father was killed. At a grocery store, they are attacked by Addison's gunmen and Lucas gets shot in the leg. The two get on a train, where they meet Dani (Verónica Echegui), another contract killer. After treating Lucas's wounds, Dani makes Ella leave Lucas. Ella gets off the train, but Metzger (Martin Compston), an assassin who had killed Ella's father, tries to kill her. Lucas protects Ella.

While Lucas recovers from drug addiction, Ella takes his gun and goes to Addison's office building, but she gets arrested by the police. Banks (Amy Landecker), an FBI agent working for Addison, takes Ella to Addison's house. At that time, Lucas is attacked by Dani and her colleague killer. He kills them and goes to Addison's house. In a final shootout, Lucas kills Banks and Addison shoots Metzger. As Addison is about to shoot Lucas, he is shot dead by Ella.

Ella receives a phone call from Lucas. Ella tells Lucas that she is now living with her aunt and cousins. The two say farewell to each other. Lucas visits a house, where his wife and daughter are waiting to welcome him.

== Cast ==
- Sam Worthington as Stephen Lucas
- Odeya Rush as Ella Hatto
- Allen Leech as Richard Addison
- Amy Landecker as Gina Banks
- Martin Compston as Metzger
- Verónica Echegui as Dani
- Gabrielle Mostow as Jillian
- Shayne Drummond as Teresa

== Production ==
On January 30, 2013, it was announced that Sam Worthington would star lead as a hitman who helps a young girl to avenge the murder of her parents and brother, the film For the Dogs, based on Kevin Wignall's novel of same name, scripted by Paul Leyden and Oren Moverman was re-writing the script at that time. Phillip Noyce was set to direct the film, which Anthony Rhulen and Navid McIlhargey would produce through FilmEngine Entertainment, along with Worthington, John Schwarz and Michael Schwarz through their Full Clip Productions, with Leyden. On May 13, Hailee Steinfeld was added to the cast to play the young girl whose parents and brother are murdered. On November 8, the ensemble cast was announced which includes Martin Compston, Amy Landecker and Verónica Echegui. Sierra/Affinity announced that they had sold the film to twenty international buyers.

=== Filming ===
Filming began in early November 2014 in Yorkshire, England (Leeds, Harrogate, Helmsley, Scarborough and Saltaire). It would also be shot in Germany, Spain, U.S. (New York City) and Hungary.

== Release ==
On September 9, 2016, Saban Capital Group acquired the distribution rights to the film via its dedicated division, Saban Films, which released in the United States on June 9, 2017.

== Reception ==
The Hunter's Prayer received poor reviews from critics. On Rotten Tomatoes, the film has an approval rating of 29% based on 21 reviews, and an average rating of 4.9/10. On Metacritic, which assigns a normalized rating, the film has a score 35 out of 100, based on 5 critics, indicating "unfavorable reviews".

Derek Smith of Slant Magazine gave the film 2.5 stars out of 4, writing, "The Hunter's Prayer is steadfastly concise and efficient, foregrounding action above expositional groundwork." Joe Leydon of Variety wrote, "Director Jonathan Mostow (Terminator 3) provides enough hairbreadth escapes, extended shootouts, crash-and-dash auto chases, and hand-to-hand combat sequences to make the movie modestly diverting for undemanding audiences." Justin Lowe of The Hollywood Reporter said, "The action falters a bit when attention shifts to the rocky relationship between Lucas and Ella, but cinematographer Jose David Montero and editor Ken Blackwell succeed in getting things back on track with a consistent succession of energetic chase and fight scenes."
