= Olympic League =

High school athletic league in California

The Olympic League is a high school athletic league that is part of the CIF Southern Section, which is composed of private schools.

== Members ==
- Heritage Christian School (North Hills)
- Maranatha High School (Pasadena)
- Valley Christian High School (Cerritos)
- Village Christian School (Sun Valley)
- Whittier Christian High School (La Habra)
