= Dangerous Waters (2023 film) =

Film by John Barr

- Theatrical release poster
- Directed by: John Barr
- Written by: Mark Jackson
- Story by: John Barr
- Produced by: Suza Horvat; Marc Goldberg
- Starring: Odeya Rush; Eric Dane; Saffron Burrows; Ray Liotta
- Cinematography: John Barr
- Edited by: Emma Gaffney; Roger Cropley II
- Music by: Zak McNeil
- Production companies: Signature Films; Rio Luna Films
- Distributed by: Brainstorm Media
- Release date: October 13, 2023 (United States)
- Running time: 101 minutes
- Country: United States
- Language: English

Dangerous Waters is a 2023 American action thriller film directed and written by John Barr. The film stars Odeya Rush, Eric Dane, Saffron Burrows, and Ray Liotta.

Dangerous Waters premiered on October 13, 2023, in select theaters and video on demand.

== Plot ==
Rose and her mother Alma set off on a trip to celebrate Alma's birthday, travelling by car to a marina where they meet up with Derek, Alma's new boyfriend, and set off on a sail to Bermuda. Derek attempts to bond with Rose on the boat, with limited success, as Alma and Derek enjoy their romantic getaway. A few days into the sail, their boat is attacked and boarded by armed men. As Rose hides, the men shoot and kill Alma, and shoot Derek. After the men leave, Rose tends for a wounded Derek, and attempts to repair the damage caused to the ship by the attackers. Rose sails the ship to a small, uninhabited island, where she and Derek disembark.

On the island the tense relationship between Derek and Rose continues. Derek reveals that after many years of being a decent cop and getting nowhere, he begins to work with other dirty cops and eventually ripped them off, and that the men who boarded his ship and killed Alma were dirty cops he had ripped off. Derek tells Rose he lied to her to gain her trust because he knew he needed to kill her before being rescued as she would raise too many questions. He attempts to kill Rose but she escapes and makes it back to the life boat.

Drifting at sea, Rose is rescued by a vessel belonging to The Captain (Ray Liotta). Rose soon discovers that the vessel is being used for trafficking young women, who are being held captive on the ship. Rose pretends to flirt with the captain before killing him and his crew, and freeing the hostage girls.

Interviewed by police after their rescue, Rose learns that the abducted young women are being reunited with their families and that she will soon be sent home as well. Rose cries, saying she has no home anymore, she has nothing. The detective consoles by telling her that she has a bright future, and one she fought for.

== Cast ==
- Odeya Rush as Rose
- Eric Dane as Derek
- Saffron Burrows as Alma
- Ray Liotta as the Captain
- Sala Baker as henchman John
- Brian Duffy as henchman Bill
- Matt Servitto as Agent Friedman

== Production ==
"Dangerous Waters" is based on a story by John Barr, with the screenplay written by Mark Jackson. Filming took place in Dominican Republic in mid-2022. It was the final film Ray Liotta made, as on May 26, 2022, Liotta died in his sleep in Santo Domingo while filming, and his role had to be truncated.

== Release and reception ==
The film was released in theaters and video on demand on October 13, 2023, receiving mostly mixed to negative reviews, with criticism for being formulaic and unconvincing, yet some praise for pacing and tension. The film has a 29% 'rotten' rating on Rotten Tomatoes.
