= Brad Lamm =

Interventionist and author

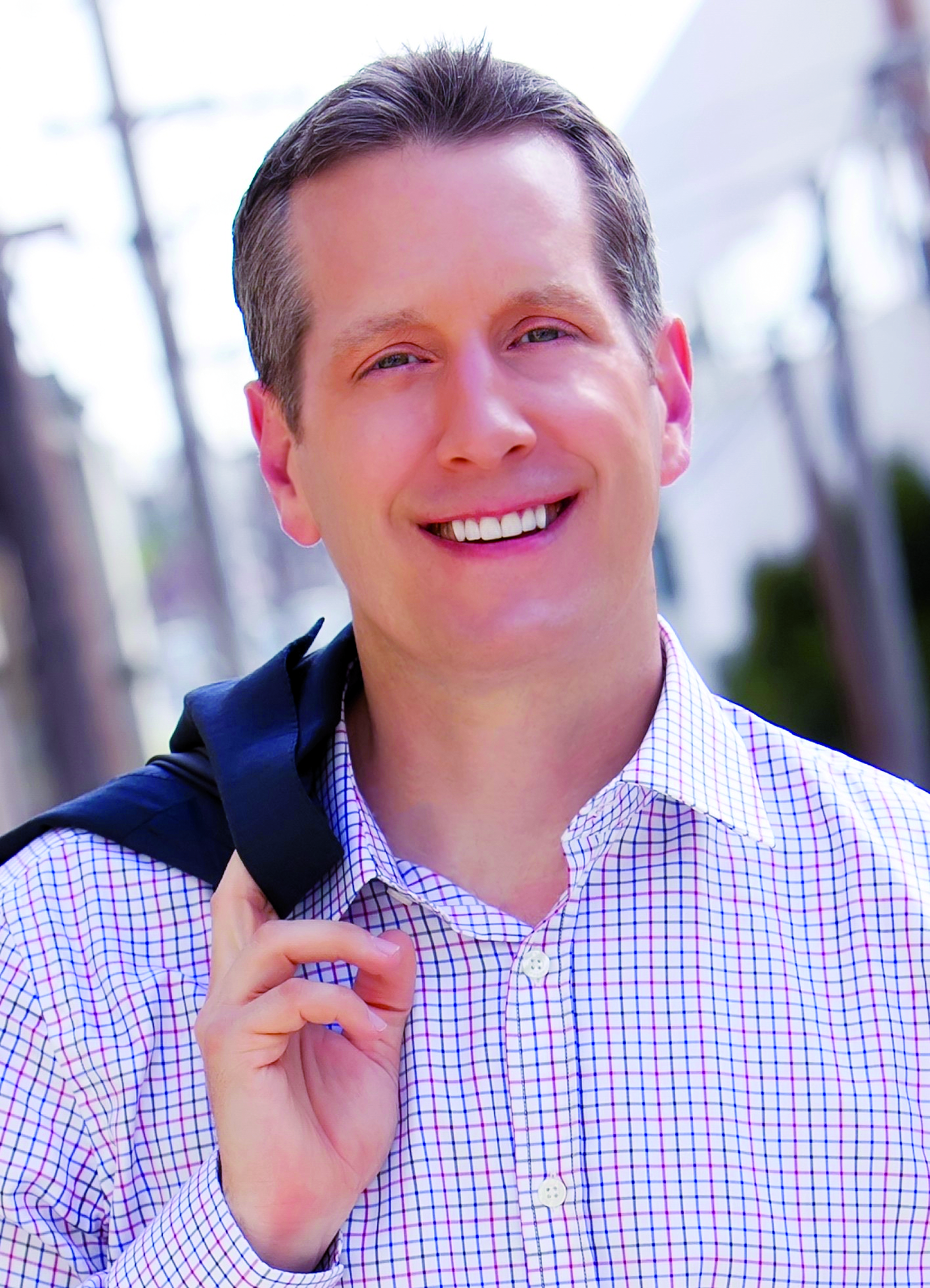
- Lamm in 2014
- Born: 1966 (age 59–60); Wenatchee, Washington, U.S.
- Occupations: Interventionist, Healthecare Entreupenuer, Author
- Spouse: Scott Sanders (m. 2008)

Brad Lamm (born 1966) is an American interventionist, educator and author of many books including How to Help the One You Love: A New Way to Intervene (2010). How to Help details the theory and practice of a system of psychosocial invitation-based intervention named "Breakfree Intervention", which trains and uses "voices that matter" (the friends and family of an identified loved one) as an ongoing "support circle". He owns and operates Intervention.com as part of Change Institute which is a family resource for those seeking help to intervene to help one they love with agency locations in New York City, Cape Cod and Los Angeles. Lamm is also the author of Just 10 Lbs (2011), a self-help book on the diet-obsessed public's "need to feed" and what he describes as “emotional eating” in the face of mounting evidence of the dangers of restrictive eating, fad diets and binge eating trends.

== Early Life & Education ==
Lamm was born in 1966 in Wenatchee, Washington, the youngest of four brothers. His father was an Evangelical Quaker minister. The family moved to Eugene, Oregon in 1968, where he attended public school until the middle of his sophomore year at Winston Churchill High School. In 1982 the family moved to Yorba Linda, California, where his father became Senior Pastor of Yorba Linda Friends Church, the largest Friends Church in the nation. Lamm attended Whittier Christian High School, the University of California, Los Angeles and Pennsylvania State University. Lamm is a lifelong Quaker, who launched Spark Recovery (2013), an interfaith peer to peer support network. His short story, It Hurts a Little, was featured in Newsweek (2018) on the anniversary of his cover story Gays Under Fire. It became the basis for an announced documentary by the same name.

== From University to Career ==
After college, Lamm lived in Kamakura, Japan, for over a year before settling in New York City, where he worked producing television news programs and writing music. Dubbed the "once reigning king of the late night party scene", he wrote for and hosted the syndicated entertainment TV show Party Talk, seen in New York, Los Angeles and six other US markets. In 1994, he relocated to work as a weatherman in Boise, Idaho and then Washington, D.C., where he worked as a network television weather anchor, working while abusing both drugs and alcohol. Lamm opened nightclubs in Washington, D.C. and Denver in 2001, but entered a drug and alcohol rehabilitation program in February 2003. His subjective experiences of his own rehabilitation, combined with his study with and mentorship by Boulder, Colorado psychiatrist Dr. Judith Landau on the efficacy of the family-centered process in helping addicts overcome addiction. Landau's work on the evidence-based best-practice invitational intervention known as ARISE (A Relational Intervention Sequence of Events), is based on the studies Landau co-authored while at the University of Pennsylvania.

Lamm has asserted that substance abusers with strong familial and social support systems are five times as likely to succeed in their goal of sobriety as persons lacking support. He calls this supportive system a "firewall". Lamm was a founding member of Mehmet Oz's "Experts" team and has presented to Parliament on Trauma's Link to Behavioral Health Suffering, as well as to the UK-European Symposium on Addictive Disorders. Lamm also speaks and works on issues of eating disorders, food and obesity with individuals and organizations. With the consent of the addict, Lamm's program works with family members, co-workers, partners, employers and friends to develop and implement a plan of change and a recovery model. He conducts trainings and workshops in his method of Breakfree Intervention. He is a proponent of the notion that, for the person with a serious problem, loving peer groups and family members are vitally important for effective personal change.

In 2011, Lamm created and produced the eight part docu-series Addicted to Food for the Oprah Winfrey Network. The series follows the day-to-day lives of eight patients that have been diagnosed with an eating disorder as they work to improve their lives and overcome their self-harming cycle of over-feeding. His book on lifestyle intervention relating to one's "need to feed" and food addiction, Just 10 Lbs: Easy Steps to Weighing What You Want (Finally) was published along with the accompanying workbook. Also in 2011, what began as a wellness program for Walmart employees, became the most successful commercial stop-smoking campaign of all time: "Blueprint to Quit", sponsored by GlaxoSmithKline and available exclusively at Walmart. Lamm's book "Stop It: 4 Steps in 4 Weeks to Quit Smoking Now" focusses on a breathing protocol, the need for community support in addition to the necessity of a proper detox from nicotine.

=== Trauma Treatment & Breathe Life Healing Center ===
In early 2012, Lamm's rehab program, Breathe Life Healing Center, opened in the Gramercy Park neighborhood of New York City. Breathe's second center opened in West Hollywood. Clients are treated for primary mental health, substance use, eating disorders or primary trauma in specific units.

== Journalism, Activism and Media ==
An early member of ACT UP and advocacy group Queer Nation, Lamm appeared in Newsweek's in 1991 as an activist for social justice and equality. In September 1992, he appeared on the cover of the magazine's "Gays Under Fire" issue, which reported on limited national support for LGBT rights. Nearly 24 years later, Newsweek published Lamm's account of being attacked by five men in New York, among other updates since his cover appearance.

== Marriage & Personal Life ==
In 2008, Lamm married television and stage producer Scott Sanders in a ceremony officiated by novelist Alice Walker.

== Bibliography ==
=== Books ===
- Lamm, Brad (2009). How to Change Someone You Love: Four Steps to Help You Help Them. Macmillan. ISBN 9781429966788.
- Lamm, Brad (2010). How to Help the One You Love: A New Way to Intervene and Stop Someone from Self-Destructing. Macmillan. ISBN 9781429973922.
- Lamm, Brad (2011). Just 10 Lbs: Easy Steps to Weighing What You Want (Finally). Hay House. ISBN 9781401931797.
- Lamm, Brad (2011). Just 10 Lbs Challenge: Companion Workbook.
- Lamm, Brad (2015). Stop It: 4 Steps in 4 Weeks to Quit Smoking. BLamm Holdings Incorporated. ISBN 978-0692381557.
- Lamm, Brad (2018). Crystal Clear + Sexually Recovered (Clinical Program Text). Change Institute Press.
