= Whittier Christian High School =

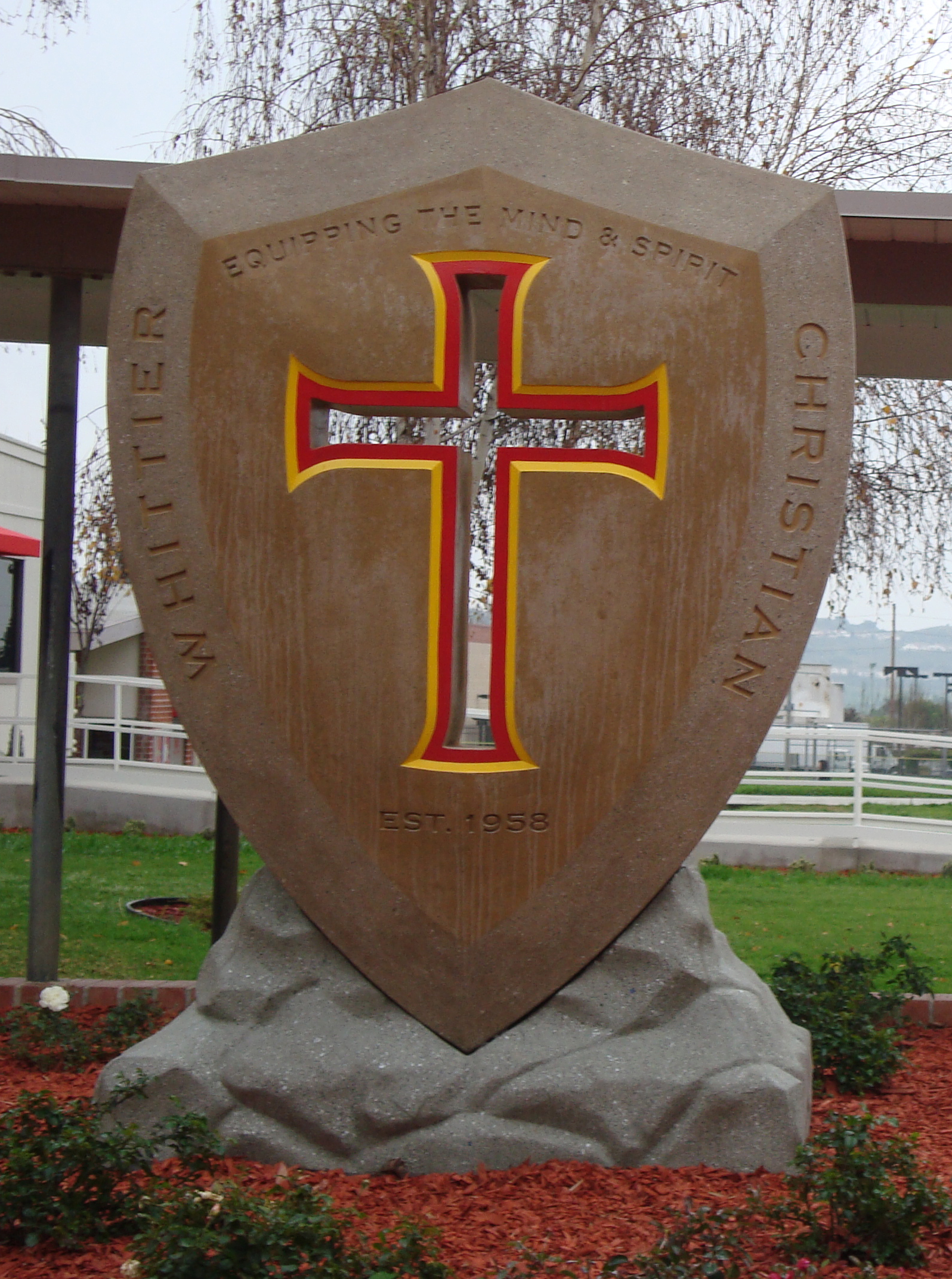

Location
- 501 N Beach Blvd; La Habra, California 90631; United States; 33.93563°N 117.97019°W

Information
- Type: Private
- Religious affiliation: non-denominational Christian
- Established: 1958
- Head of school: Carl Martinez
- Grades: 9-12
- Enrollment: 500
- Colors: Red; Gold; White
- Athletics conference: CIF Southern Section Olympic League
- Mascot: Herald
- Team name: Heralds
- Accreditation: Western Association of Schools and Colleges, Association of Christian Schools International
- Newspaper: The Herald
- Yearbook: The Trumpet'
- School fees: $400
- Tuition: $12,950 (2016-2017)
- Website: http://www.wchs.com

Whittier Christian High School is a non-profit, non-denominational, Christian high school located in La Habra, California. It was founded in 1958. The high school has a gymnasium named the Leon Davis Event Center, after the school worker Leon Davis. Whittier Christian is also nicknamed "Dub-C".

== History ==
Whittier Christian High School opened on September 15, 1958, though planning for the school began only nine months earlier on January 4, 1958. WCHS welcomed forty-four 9th and 10th grade students to the College Avenue Church of the Nazarene facilities. By October 1975, the student body had grown to 380 high school students, and Whittier Christian moved to the Grovedale Elementary campus in East Whittier. In 1979, the school leased the Maybrook campus to serve the freshmen students. It was 1981 when the tenth-twelfth grade students moved to the current campus in La Habra.

== Athletics ==
Since its founding in 1958 the school has won 102 League Championships. In addition it has 19 CIF Championships:

- Football: 1979, 1983, 1984, 1990, 2010 runners-up, 2022 D14 CIF champions
- Baseball: 1987
- Boys Basketball: 1989
- Girls Basketball: 2007, 2008,
- Boys Volleyball: 1991, 1992, 1993, 2018
- Girls Volleyball: 2000, 2008 runners-up, 2009, 2012, 2013
- Softball: 2005, 2009, 2010, 2026

== Notable alumni ==
- Lauren Maltby (Class of 2002), actress
- Sam Paulescu (Class of 2002), NFL punter
- Jenna Johnson (Class of 1985), former competitive swimmer, winner of three medals at the 1984 Summer Olympics
- Brad Lamm (Class of 1984), author
- Tim Minear (Class of 1981) writer, director and producer
- Roger Mobley (Class of 1967), former television and motion picture actor
- Rob Liefeld (Class of 1985), artist for Marvel Entertainment
- Han Dong-geun] (Class of 2012), South Korean singer
