= Village Christian School =

Private school in Los Angeles, California, United States

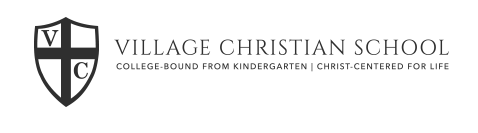

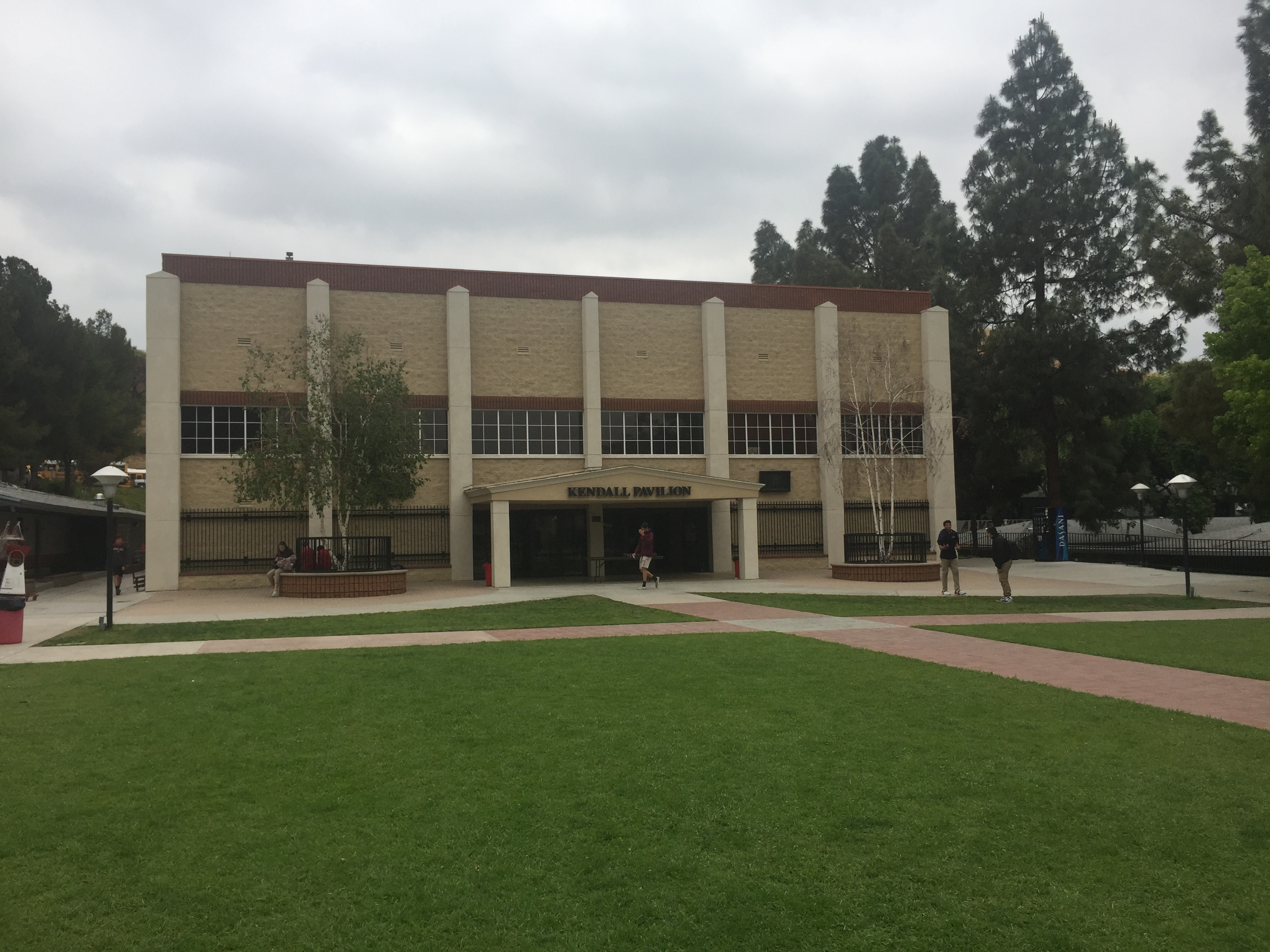

Location
- 8930 Village Ave. Los Angeles, California 91352; United States
- 34.23042°N 118.35543°W

Information
- Type: Private, coeducational
- Motto: "College-Bound from Kindergarten, Christ-Centered for Life"
- Religious affiliations: Christian, Protestant
- Established: 1949
- Founder: Pastor Phil Gibson
- Chairman: Dave Bethany
- Principal: Tom Konjoyan (Head of School), Dana Mikels (High School Principal), Robert Sayles (Middle School Principal), Jeff Maljian (Elementary School Principal)
- Grades: K–12
- Enrollment: 1,100
- Colors: Red and black
- Athletics conference: CIF Southern Section; Olympic League
- Mascot: Crusader
- Nickname: Crusaders
- Accreditation: WASC; ACSI; CIF Southern Section; NASSP; College Board; National Blue Ribbon School (2003)
- Website: villagechristian.org

Village Christian School (VCS) is a private, K-12 Christian school located in the Sun Valley neighborhood of Los Angeles, California, United States.

The school was founded in 1949 by members of The Village Church in nearby Burbank. Their mascot is the Crusader. Village Christian has a total enrollment of approximately 1,100 students in grades K–12.

== History ==
Founded in 1949, Village Christian School has provided a Christian education in the greater Los Angeles area for more than 64 years. From its beginnings in a small church building with only 40 elementary students, VCS has grown to approximately 1,100 students (K-12) on a 110-acre campus, 30 of which are developed.

Village Christian School was founded by Pastor Phil Gibson, pastor of the Village Christian Church in Burbank. The school started in the buildings of Village Church in Burbank. In 1957, the Board of Directors authorized the purchase of the current property on Penrose and Village Avenue. Since that initial ground-breaking, Village Christian has continued to grow and at one time was the largest Christian School on one campus west of the Mississippi River. The school continues to add buildings and programs.

== Academic achievement ==
In 2003, Village Christian School was named a National Blue Ribbon School of Excellence by the United States Department of Education.

In 2019, students passed 73% of all AP exams administered, performing notably better than national averages in many subject areas.

In 2017, every student in the graduating class was accepted into at least one four-year school.

== Academic accreditations ==
Village Christian School is accredited by WASC (Western Association of Schools and Colleges), one of six regional associations that accredit public and private secondary school colleges, and universities in the United States. Village Christian School is also accredited by CESA (Council on Educational Standards and Accountability). It is the first California school to be admitted as a Member of Council to the CESA organization.

== Memberships ==
- California Scholarship Federation (CSF)
- California Interscholastic Federation, Southern Section (CIF)
- National Association of Secondary School Principals (NASSP)
- College Board
- California Interscholastic Society (CIS)
- International Scholarship Federation (ISF)
- Council on Educational Standards and Accountability (CESA)

== Notable alumni ==
- Paul Walker (1991), american actor
- Jerrick Ahanmisi (2015), basketball player
- Bennie Boatwright (2015), basketball player
