= Ray Liotta =

American actor (1954–2022)

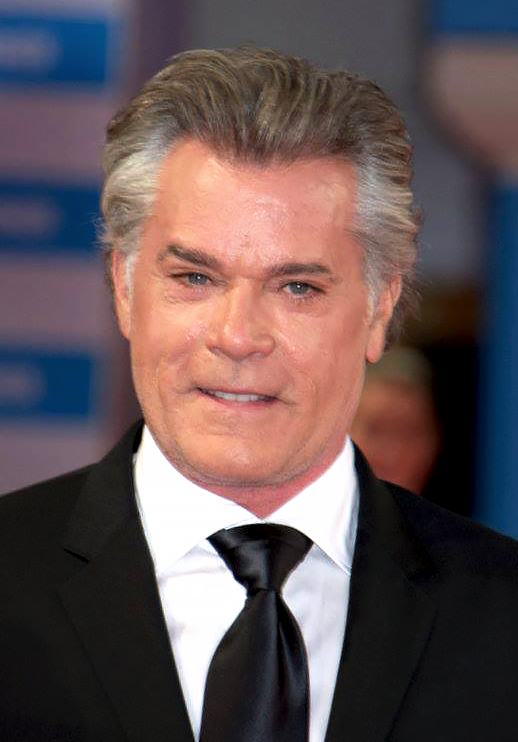
- Liotta in 2014
- Born: December 18, 1954; Newark, New Jersey, U.S.
- Died: May 26, 2022 (aged 67); Santo Domingo, Dominican Republic
- Education: University of Miami (BFA)
- Occupations: Actor; film producer
- Years active: 1978–2022
- Spouse: Michelle Grace (m. 1997; div. 2004)
- Children: 1

Raymond Allen Liotta (/liˈoʊtə/ lee-OH-tə, Italian: [liˈɔtta]; December 18, 1954 – May 26, 2022) was an American actor. He first gained attention for his role in the film Something Wild (1986), which earned him a Golden Globe Award nomination. He was best known for his portrayals of Shoeless Joe Jackson in the film Field of Dreams (1989) and Henry Hill in the film Goodfellas (1990). Liotta appeared in numerous other films, including Unlawful Entry (1992), Corrina, Corrina ( 1994), Cop Land (1997), Hannibal, Heartbreakers (both 2001), John Q., Narc (both 2002), Identity (2003), Wild Hogs (2007), Killing Them Softly, The Place Beyond the Pines (both 2012), and Marriage Story (2019). He was also known for providing the voice for Tommy Vercetti, the playable protagonist in Grand Theft Auto: Vice City (2002).

Liotta won a Primetime Emmy Award for his guest role in the television series ER in 2005. He starred as Frank Sinatra in the television film The Rat Pack (1998) and Lorca in the miniseries Texas Rising (2015), both of which earned him Screen Actors Guild Award nominations, and starred in the series Shades of Blue (2016–2018) and Black Bird (2022). The latter garnered him a posthumous Primetime Emmy Award nomination for his role as Big Jim Keene at the 75th Primetime Emmy Awards.

After his death in 2022, Liotta was posthumously recognized on the Hollywood Walk of Fame on February 24, 2023. His films that were released posthumously include Cocaine Bear, Fool's Paradise, Dangerous Waters (all 2023), and 1992 (2024).

== Early life and education ==
Raymond Allen Liotta was born in Newark, New Jersey, on December 18, 1954. After being abandoned at an orphanage, he was adopted at the age of six months by township clerk Mary (née Edgar) and auto parts store owner Alfred Liotta. His adoptive parents were Scottish and Italian Americans. Alfred was a personnel director and president of a local Democratic Party club. Each of his adoptive parents ran unsuccessfully for local political office; he recalled attending parades to hand out flyers for his father's run.

Liotta had a sister, Linda, who was also adopted. He said that he knew that he was adopted as a young child, and presented a show-and-tell report. In the 2000s, he used a private detective to locate his biological mother Ruth, who told him he was of Scottish descent. He had one biological sister, one biological half-brother also named Ray, and five biological half-sisters.

His family was Roman Catholic, although not especially religious. They attended church and he received first communion and was confirmed, but the family did not pray much. He occasionally used prayer in his daily life, telling an interviewer, "... if I'm in a fix, I'll pray ... if I'm feeling uncomfortable about something, I'll say "Our Fathers" and "Hail Marys" to this day."

Liotta grew up in Union, New Jersey,. In 1973, he graduated from Union High School, and was later named to the Union High School Hall of Fame.

Liotta attended the University of Miami, where he studied acting and graduated with a Bachelor of Fine Arts in 1978. He performed in plays and musicals, including Cabaret, Dames at Sea, Oklahoma, and The Sound of Music, at the University of Miami's Jerry Herman Ring Theatre.

== Career ==
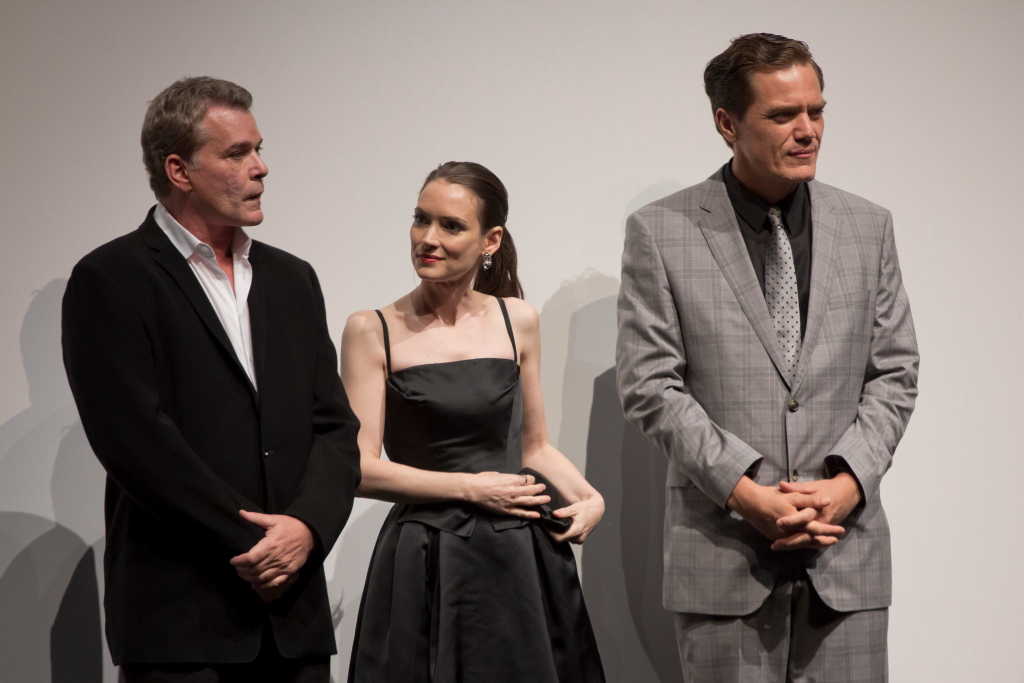
Liotta, Winona Ryder, and Michael Shannon at the 2012 Toronto International Film Festival for the premiere of The Iceman

After graduating from the University of Miami, Liotta moved to New York City, where he was hired as a bartender at the Shubert Organization and landed an agent within six months. One of his earliest roles was as Joey Perrini on the soap opera Another World, on which he appeared from 1978 to 1981. He left the show and moved to Los Angeles. He made his film debut in 1983's The Lonely Lady. His first major acting role was Something Wild (1986), for which he received his first Golden Globe nomination, this nomination being for Best Supporting Actor – Motion Picture. In 1989, Liotta played the ghost of baseball player Shoeless Joe Jackson in the fantasy/drama film Field of Dreams.

In 1990, Liotta portrayed real-life mobster Henry Hill in Martin Scorsese's universally praised and commercially successful Academy Award winning film Goodfellas. In 1992, he starred as a psychopathic cop in the thriller Unlawful Entry. He appeared in a leading role in the 1994 science-fiction/action film No Escape. In 1995, he starred in the war comedy film Operation Dumbo Drop. In 1996, he starred in the sci-fi/thriller Unforgettable. Liotta earned critical praise for his turn in James Mangold's 1997 film Cop Land, and he received critical praise in 1998 for his performance as a compulsive gambler in Phoenix.

Liotta portrayed singer Frank Sinatra in the 1998 television film The Rat Pack (for which he received a Screen Actors Guild award nomination). He starred as himself in the sitcom Just Shoot Me! in December 2001. He provided the voice of Tommy Vercetti for the 2002 video game Grand Theft Auto: Vice City. He appeared in the television drama ER in 2004, playing Charlie Metcalf in the episode "Time of Death".

The ER role earned Liotta an Emmy for Outstanding Guest Actor in a Drama Series (Liotta later spoofed himself and his Emmy win in Bee Movie). Liotta starred in the 2006 CBS television series Smith, which was pulled from the schedule after three episodes. In 2012, Liotta appeared as himself in a purely vocal role for the "What a Croc!" episode of the Disney Channel comedy series Phineas and Ferb.

Liotta played the Justice Department official Paul Krendler in the 2001 film Hannibal opposite Anthony Hopkins and Julianne Moore. Also in 2001, he played the father of drug dealer George Jung in the film Blow, and a victim of a mother-daughter con-artist team played by Sigourney Weaver and Jennifer Love Hewitt in Heartbreakers. In 2002, he appeared as Detective Lieutenant Henry Oak in the Joe Carnahan-directed film Narc, a role that led to an Independent Spirit Award nomination and a Phoenix Film Critics Society Awards nomination for Best Supporting Male.

He reunited with director James Mangold in 2003, alongside John Cusack and Alfred Molina, in the dark horror-thriller Identity. In 2005, he narrated Inside the Mafia for the National Geographic Channel. In 2006, he appeared in Smokin' Aces—reuniting with Narc director Carnahan, in which he portrayed an FBI agent named Donald Carruthers in one of the lead roles. In 2004, Liotta made his Broadway debut opposite Frank Langella in the Stephen Belber play Match. Ben Brantley of The New York Times described Liotta as "compelling" but "doesn't have much to work with for his Broadway debut." That same year he appeared in an advertisement for Heineken in the UK. The ads were eventually pulled by Ofcom "in breach of the advertising code for implying that stronger alcohol is better."

In 2007, Liotta appeared with John Travolta in the film Wild Hogs, and in Battle in Seattle as the city's mayor. In 2008, he starred in Hero Wanted as a detective alongside Cuba Gooding Jr. Also in 2008, he made a guest appearance on the SpongeBob SquarePants episode "What Ever Happened to SpongeBob?". In the episode, he voices the leader of a gang called the Bubble Poppin' Boys, who try to kill an amnesiac SpongeBob (voiced by Tom Kenny). In 2009 he appeared in Crossing Over, co-starring Harrison Ford. Liotta played Detective Harrison in the 2009 Jody Hill comedy Observe and Report as Seth Rogen's nemesis from the local police. In 2011, he starred in The Son of No One, opposite Channing Tatum and Al Pacino.

In the 2010s, Liotta appeared in Date Night with Steve Carell, in Charlie St. Cloud with Zac Efron, the independent drama Snowmen, and The River Sorrow, which stars Liotta as a detective alongside Christian Slater and Ving Rhames. He starred alongside Brad Pitt and James Gandolfini in the 2012 Andrew Dominik film Killing Them Softly and the 2012 Ariel Vromen film The Iceman features Liotta as the character of Roy DeMeo. He had a supporting role in Muppets Most Wanted (2014).

In 2014, he played a preacher in the faith-based film The Identical. His other 2014 projects include Kill the Messenger with Jeremy Renner, Stretch with Chris Pine, and a David Guetta video. He starred in the Western miniseries Texas Rising for The History Channel in 2015. For his performance he earned a Screen Actors Guild Award for Outstanding Performance by a Male Actor in a Miniseries or Television Movie nomination. From 2015 to 2016, he narrated the AMC docu-series The Making of the Mob. In 2016, Liotta provided the narration for a Palm Beach County tourism television commercial promoting the area's beaches and attractions. Liotta starred opposite Jennifer Lopez in Shades of Blue between 2016 and 2018. In 2018, he became a spokesperson for Pfizer's Chantix advertising campaign.

Liotta appeared as Charlie Barber's (Adam Driver) second divorce attorney, Jay Marotta in the 2019 Noah Baumbach film Marriage Story. The film received critical acclaim and earned six Academy Award nominations including Best Picture. Liotta received praise for his performance with Peter Bradshaw of The Guardian declaring, "what a thrill to hear his syrupy-gravelly voice again". The Hollywood Reporter described Liotta as being in "fine, mischievous form". In 2021, he played twin brothers "Hollywood Dick" Moltisanti and Salvatore "Sally" Moltisanti in the film The Many Saints of Newark, a prequel to the HBO crime drama series The Sopranos.

Liotta appeared in Cocaine Bear, a thriller film based on the true story of an American black bear that ingested a duffel bag full of cocaine in 1985. The movie, released in theaters in February 2023, is directed by Elizabeth Banks and traces the aftermath of a drug runner's cocaine disappearing in a plane crash and being devoured by a bear. The movie was dedicated to his memory.

== Personal life ==
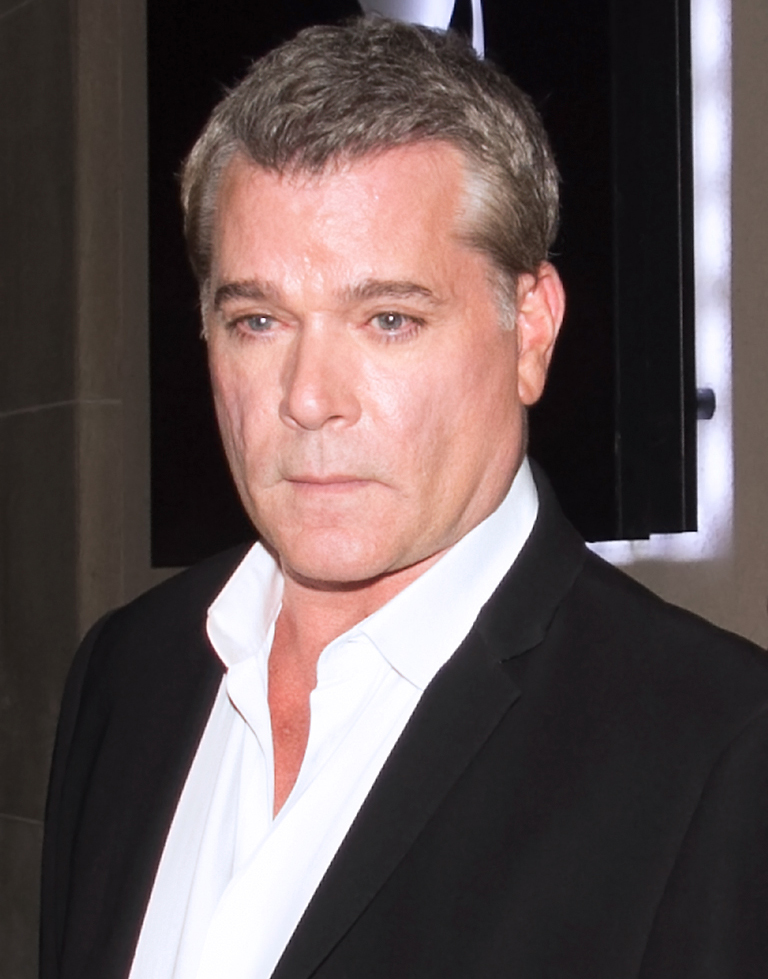
Liotta in 2012

Liotta married Michelle Grace, an actress and producer, in February 1997 after they met at a baseball game, where her former husband Mark Grace was playing for the Chicago Cubs. They had a daughter before divorcing amicably in 2004.

On an episode of Jay Leno's Garage, Liotta revealed that Nancy and Tina Sinatra once sent Liotta a fake horse's head in the mail. The joke was in response to Liotta's declining to play their father in a miniseries they were working on, only to see Liotta play him in the 1998 HBO television film The Rat Pack.

In February 2007, he was charged with driving under the influence after crashing his Cadillac Escalade into two parked vehicles in Pacific Palisades. He pleaded no contest.

From his experience shooting the Western Texas Rising, Liotta continued horseback riding and said in September 2014: "I was obsessed with riding horses [on the show]. I love it now. I've never had a hobby. It might be my new hobby."

In May 2017, Liotta, along with talk show host and actress Kelly Ripa, was inducted into the New Jersey Hall of Fame.

In 2018, while discussing his role alongside Jennifer Lopez as a corrupt cop targeted by the FBI in the NBC crime drama Shades of Blue, Liotta told a reporter for Long Island Weekly:

You want to do as many different genres as you can and that's what I've been doing. I've done movies with the Muppets. I did Sinatra. I did good guys and bad guys. I did a movie with an elephant. I decided that I was here to try different parts and do different things. That's what it's really all about. That's what a career should be.

In 2022, after wrapping up filming of Cocaine Bear, Liotta made a speech and stated that he was known for being Italian, but he did a heritage tree and found that he mostly has Irish ancestry.

== Death ==
Liotta died in his sleep on May 26, 2022, at age 67, in Santo Domingo, the Dominican Republic, during the filming of Dangerous Waters. At the time of his death, he was engaged to Jacy Nittolo. An autopsy report released in 2023 concluded that Liotta's cause of death was respiratory failure, pulmonary edema, and heart failure, with atherosclerosis cited as an underlying issue.

Liotta was posthumously recognized on the Hollywood Walk of Fame on February 24, 2023, with his daughter accepting the recognition on his behalf.

== Filmography ==
=== Film ===
| Year | Title | Role | Notes | Ref. |
|---|---|---|---|---|
| 1983 | The Lonely Lady | Joe Heron | Film debut | |
| 1986 | Something Wild | Ray Sinclair | | |
| 1987 | Arena Brains | The Artist | Short film | |
| 1988 | Dominick and Eugene | Eugene "Gino" Luciano | | |
| 1989 | Field of Dreams | Shoeless Joe Jackson | | |
| 1990 | Goodfellas | Henry Hill | | |
| 1992 | Article 99 | Dr. Richard Sturgess | | |
| 1992 | Unlawful Entry | Officer Pete Davis | | |
| 1994 | No Escape | Captain J.T. Robbins | | |
| 1994 | Corrina, Corrina | Manny Singer | | |
| 1995 | Operation Dumbo Drop | Captain T.C. Doyle | | |
| 1996 | Unforgettable | Dr. David Krane | | |
| 1997 | Turbulence | Ryan Weaver | | |
| 1997 | Cop Land | Detective Gary "Figgsy" Figgis | | |
| 1998 | Phoenix | Detective Harry Collins | Also co-producer | |
| 1999 | Muppets from Space | Gate Guard | Cameo | |
| 1999 | Forever Mine | Mark Brice | | |
| 2000 | Pilgrim | Jack | | |
| 2000 | A Rumor of Angels | Nathan Neubauer | | |
| 2001 | Hannibal | Paul Krendler | | |
| 2001 | Heartbreakers | Dean Cummano / Vinny Staggliano | | |
| 2001 | Blow | Fred Jung | | |
| 2002 | John Q. | Chief Gus Monroe | | |
| 2002 | Narc | Lieutenant Henry Oak | Also producer | |
| 2002 | Ticker | Secret Service agent | Short film | |
| 2003 | Identity | Officer Rhodes | | |
| 2004 | The Last Shot | Jack Devine | | |
| 2004 | Control | Lee Ray Oliver | Direct-to-DVD | |
| 2005 | Revolver | Dorothy Macha | | |
| 2005 | Slow Burn | Ford Cole | Also co-executive producer | |
| 2006 | Even Money | Tom Carver | | |
| 2006 | Take the Lead | | Executive producer | |
| 2006 | Local Color | John Talia Sr. | | |
| 2006 | Comeback Season | Walter Pearce | | |
| 2006 | Smokin' Aces | FBI Agent Donald Carruthers | | |
| 2007 | Wild Hogs | Jack Blade | | |
| 2007 | In the Name of the King: A Dungeon Siege Tale | Gallian | | |
| 2007 | Battle in Seattle | Mayor Jim Tobin | | |
| 2007 | Bee Movie | Himself (voice) | Cameo | |
| 2008 | Hero Wanted | Detective Terry Subcott | Direct-to-DVD | |
| 2008 | Powder Blue | Jack Doheny | | |
| 2009 | Crossing Over | Cole Frankel | | |
| 2009 | Observe and Report | Detective Harrison | | |
| 2009 | The Line | Mark Shields | Also executive producer | |
| 2009 | Youth in Revolt | Lance Wescott | | |
| 2010 | Crazy on the Outside | Gray | | |
| 2010 | Date Night | Joe Miletto | Uncredited | |
| 2010 | Snowmen | Reggie Kirkfield | Also executive producer | |
| 2010 | Chasing 3000 | Adult Mickey | | |
| 2010 | Charlie St. Cloud | Florio Ferrente | | |
| 2011 | The Details | Peter Mazzoni | | |
| 2011 | The Son of No One | Capt. Mathers | | |
| 2011 | All Things Fall Apart | Dr. Brintall | | |
| 2011 | Street Kings 2: Motor City | Detective Marty Kingston | Direct-to-DVD | |
| 2011 | The River Murders | Jack Verdon | | |
| 2011 | Field of Dreams 2: Lockout | Roger Goodell | Short film for Funny or Die | |
| 2011 | The Entitled | Richard Nader | | |
| 2012 | Wanderlust | Himself | Cameo | |
| 2012 | Killing Them Softly | Markie Trattman | | |
| 2012 | Breathless | Sheriff Cooley | | |
| 2012 | The Iceman | Roy DeMeo | | |
| 2012 | The Place Beyond the Pines | Peter Deluca | | |
| 2012 | Ticket Out | Jim | | |
| 2012 | Yellow | Afai | | |
| 2012 | Bad Karma | Molloy | | |
| 2012 | Dear Dracula | Count Dracula (voice) | Direct-to-DVD | |
| 2013 | The Devil's in the Details | Dr. Bruce Michaels | | |
| 2013 | Pawn | Man in the Suit | | |
| 2013 | Suddenly | Todd Shaw | | |
| 2014 | Better Living Through Chemistry | Elizabeth's Husband | | |
| 2014 | Muppets Most Wanted | Big Papa | | |
| 2014 | The Identical | Reece Wade | Also executive producer | |
| 2014 | Sin City: A Dame to Kill For | Joey | | |
| 2014 | Revenge of the Green Dragons | FBI Agent Michael Bloom | | |
| 2014 | Stretch | Himself | Cameo | |
| 2014 | Kill the Messenger | John Cullen | | |
| 2015 | Blackway | Blackway | | |
| 2015 | Campus Code | Bartender | | |
| 2016 | Sticky Notes | Jack | | |
| 2016 | Flock of Dudes | Uncle Reed | | |
| 2019 | Marriage Story | Jay Marotta | | |
| 2020 | Hubie Halloween | Mr. Pete Landolfa | | |
| 2021 | No Sudden Move | Frank Capelli | | |
| 2021 | The Many Saints of Newark | Aldo "Hollywood Dick" Moltisanti / Salvatore "Sally" Moltisanti | | |
| 2022 | Every Last Secret | Mr. Ancilla | | |
| 2023 | Cocaine Bear | Syd White | Posthumous release | |
| 2023 | Fool's Paradise | The Producer | Posthumous release | |
| 2023 | Dangerous Waters | The Captain | Posthumous release | |
| 2024 | 1992 | Lowell | Posthumous release | |

=== Television ===
| Year | Title | Role | Notes | Ref. |
|---|---|---|---|---|
| 1978–1981 | Another World | Joey Perrini | | |
| 1980 | Hardhat and Legs | Family | Television film | |
| 1981 | Crazy Times | Johnny "Wizard" Lazarra | Television film | |
| 1983 | St. Elsewhere | Murray | Episode: "Rain" | |
| 1983 | Casablanca | Sacha | 5 episodes | |
| 1984 | Mike Hammer | Tony Cable | Episode: "Kill Devil" | |
| 1985 | Our Family Honor | Officer Ed Santini | 10 episodes | |
| 1991 | Women & Men 2 | Meadows | Television film | |
| 1995 | Frasier | Bob | Voice; Episode: "Frasier Grinch" | |
| 1998 | The Rat Pack | Frank Sinatra | Television film | |
| 2001 | Family Guy | Zack | Voice; Episode: "Brian Does Hollywood" | |
| 2001–2002 | Just Shoot Me! | Himself | 2 episodes | |
| 2002 | Point of Origin | John Leonard Orr | Television film | |
| 2003 | Saturday Night Live | Himself (host) | Episode: "Ray Liotta/The Donnas" | |
| 2004 | ER | Charlie Metcalf | Episode: "Time of Death" | |
| 2006–2007 | Smith | Bobby Stevens | 7 episodes | |
| 2008 | SpongeBob SquarePants | Bubble Poppin Boys Leader | Voice; Episode: "What Ever Happened to SpongeBob?" | |
| 2010 | Hannah Montana | Principal Luger | Episode: "Hannah Montana to the Principal's Office" | |
| 2011 | The League | Mr. Hudabega | Episode: "Yobogoya!" | |
| 2012 | Phineas and Ferb | Himself | Voice; Episode: "What A Croc!" | |
| 2012 | NTSF:SD:SUV:: | Jason | Episode: "Wasilla Hills Cop" | |
| 2012 | Abominable Christmas | Abominable Dad | Voice; Television film | |
| 2014 | The Money | George Archer | Pilot | |
| 2015 | Texas Rising | Lorca | 5 episodes | |
| 2015–2016 | The Making of the Mob | Narrator | Voice; 16 episodes | |
| 2016–2018 | Shades of Blue | Lt. Matt Wozniak | 36 episodes | |
| 2016 | Modern Family | Himself | Episode: "Playdates" | |
| 2017 | Unbreakable Kimmy Schmidt | Paulie Fiuccillo | Episode: "Kimmy Pulls Off a Heist!" | |
| 2017 | Young Sheldon | Vincent | Episode: "A Solar Calculator, a Game Ball, and a Cheerleader's Bosom" | |
| 2018 | Great News | Himself | Episode: "Early Retirement" | |
| 2018 | The Simpsons | Morty Szyslak | Voice; Episode: "King Leer" | |
| 2021 | Hanna | Gordon Evans | 6 episodes | |
| 2022 | Black Bird | James "Big Jim" Keene | 6 episodes; Posthumous release | |

=== Video games ===
| Year | Title | Role | Notes | Ref. |
|---|---|---|---|---|
| 2002 | Grand Theft Auto: Vice City | Tommy Vercetti | | |
| 2013 | Call of Duty: Black Ops II | Billy Handsome | Character featured in the Mob of the Dead zombies map | |

=== Theater ===
| Year | Title | Role | Venue | Ref. |
|---|---|---|---|---|
| 2004 | Match | Mike | Plymouth Theatre, Broadway | |

=== Music videos ===
| Year | Title | Album | Role | Ref. |
|---|---|---|---|---|
| 2014 | "Lovers on the Sun" | Listen by David Guetta | The Villain | |
| 2015 | "Bloodstream" | × by Ed Sheeran and Rudimental | | |

== Awards and nominations ==
| Year | Award | Category | Work | Result | Ref. |
|---|---|---|---|---|---|
| 1986 | Golden Globe Award | Best Supporting Actor - Motion Picture | Something Wild | Nominated | |
| 1986 | Boston Society of Film Critics Award | Best Supporting Actor | Something Wild | Won | |
| 1986 | National Society of Film Critics | Best Supporting Actor | Something Wild | 3rd Place | |
| 1986 | New York Film Critics Circle Award | Best Supporting Actor | Something Wild | 3rd Place | |
| 1998 | Screen Actors Guild Award | Outstanding Actor in a Miniseries or TV Movie | The Rat Pack | Nominated | |
| 2002 | Independent Spirit Award | Best Supporting Male | Narc | Nominated | |
| 2002 | Phoenix Film Critics Society Award | Best Supporting Actor | Narc | Nominated | |
| 2003 | G-Phoria Award | Best Live Action/Voice Male Performance | Grand Theft Auto: Vice City | Won | |
| 2003 | Spike Video Game Award | Best Performance by a Human | Grand Theft Auto: Vice City | Won | |
| 2005 | Primetime Emmy Award | Outstanding Guest Actor in a Drama Series | ER (for "Time of Death") | Won | |
| 2015 | Screen Actors Guild Award | Outstanding Actor in a Miniseries or TV Movie | Texas Rising | Nominated | |
| 2023 | Primetime Emmy Award | Outstanding Supporting Actor in a Limited or Anthology Series or Movie | Black Bird | Nominated | |
