= Valley Christian Schools (Los Angeles County, California) =

Coordinates: 33.87131°N 118.10316°W

Location
- 10818 Artesia Blvd (administration building); Cerritos, Los Angeles County, California 90703; United States

Information
- School type: Private, Christian
- Motto: Equip & Inspire
- Religious affiliation: Christian
- Denomination: Protestant
- Founded: 1935
- NCES School ID: BB060123
- Grades: PK-12
- Gender: coeducational
- Enrollment: 600 (2014-15)
- Average class size: 21 students
- Area: 33 acres
- Campus type: small city
- Colors: Maroon and gold
- Athletics conference: Olympic League
- Team name: Defenders
- Accreditation: Western Association of Schools and Colleges
- Annual tuition: 11,640 (9-11); 11,880 (12)
- Affiliation: Christian Schools International (CSI); Association of Christian Schools International (ACSI)

Valley Christian Schools (VCS) is a private Christian K-12 school located in Los Angeles County, California. It is one of the largest in Los Angeles and Orange Counties. It was founded in 1935 and has 4 campuses (preschool, elementary, middle and high school) enrolling more than 1,300 students. The administration building and the middle and high school campuses are in Cerritos while the preschool and elementary campuses are in two separate sections in Bellflower.

In 2011, during its accreditation reviews, it received the highest degree of commendation from the Western Association of Schools and Colleges. Valley Christian Schools is a member of Christian Schools International (CSI) and the Association of Christian Schools International (ACSI).

== Academics ==
97% of VCHS graduates continue on to college. VCHS graduates who are accepted to University of California schools have the highest SAT scores of any Protestant, Catholic, or Lutheran high school in L.A. and Orange County.

In 2013, VCHS students had an 81% pass rate (3 or higher) on AP exams compared to a National average of 58%.

Valley Christian offers 20 AP and Honors courses.

== Athletics ==
Valley Christian is a member of the Olympic League of the CIF Southern Section. VCHS teams have won 200 league championships and 30 CIF state titles (and another three state runners-up). In 2011, the soccer team was ranked by USA Today as the #1 team in America. Nearly 60% of students participate in school athletics. The Girls Volleyball team has won a national championship.

After retiring from professional basketball, Dijon Thompson worked as the head varsity basketball coach at Valley Christian Schools.

== Notable alumni ==
- John Verhoeven (class of 1971), former Major League Baseball pitcher and head baseball coach at Biola University
- Greg Laswell (class of 1992), musician
- Kirk Saarloos (class of 1997), former Major League Baseball pitcher for the Houston Astros, Oakland A's, and Cincinnati Reds
- Arthur Chu (class of 2002), Jeopardy! champion
- Beau Bennett (class of 2010, transferred), National Hockey League forward for the St. Louis Blues
- Kennedy Wesley (class of 2019), soccer player
- Troy Van Leeuwen (class of 1986), musician
