= The Odd Life of Timothy Green =

2012 film by Peter Hedges

- Theatrical release poster
- Directed by: Peter Hedges
- Screenplay by: Peter Hedges
- Story by: Ahmet Zappa
- Produced by: Scott Sanders; James Whitaker; Ahmet Zappa
- Starring: Jennifer Garner; Joel Edgerton; Dianne Wiest; CJ Adams; Rosemarie DeWitt; Ron Livingston; David Morse; Common
- Cinematography: John Toll
- Edited by: Andrew Mondshein
- Music by: Geoff Zanelli
- Production companies: Walt Disney Pictures; Scott Sanders Productions
- Distributed by: Walt Disney Studios; Motion Pictures
- Release date: August 15, 2012
- Running time: 105 minutes
- Country: United States
- Language: English
- Budget: $25 million
- Box office: $56 million

The Odd Life of Timothy Green is a 2012 American fantasy comedy-drama film written and directed by Peter Hedges from a story by Ahmet Zappa. Starring Jennifer Garner, Joel Edgerton, Dianne Wiest, CJ Adams, Rosemarie DeWitt, Ron Livingston, David Morse, and Common, the film is about a magical preadolescent boy whose personality and naïveté have profound effects on the people in his town. The film was produced by Walt Disney Pictures and released theatrically on August 15, 2012. It received mixed reviews from critics, earned $55.3 million on a $25 million budget, and had modest ticket sales in its debut weekend. CJ Adams' performance won him a Young Artist Award for Best Performance in a Feature Film, while Odeya Rush's performance was nominated for the same award.

== Plot ==
The film is told from the perspective of Cindy (Jennifer Garner) and Jim Green (Joel Edgerton), as they explain their experience with a boy named Timothy (CJ Adams) in an effort to persuade an adoption agency to allow the couple to adopt a child.

Cindy, who works in the town's local museum, and Jim, who is employed at the town's historic pencil factory, reside in the fictitious town of Stanleyville, self-described as "the pencil capital of the world". The Greens are informed by doctors that they are unable to conceive. Distraught by the news, Jim convinces Cindy to dream up their ideal child and write the child's characteristics and life events on slips of notepad paper.

The couple place the notes inside a wooden box and bury it in their backyard garden. After an immediate thunderstorm, which seemingly affects only their property, a 10-year-old boy arrives at their home claiming the Greens as his parents. After finding the box they buried smashed to pieces around a large hole in the ground where they originally buried it, and finding the boy inside their house, covered in mud, they realize that the boy, named Timothy, is actually a culmination of all their wishes of what their child would be. The Greens also discover that Timothy has a startling feature; he has leaves growing on his legs, which he can only cover up by wearing long, green tube socks.

The next day, at a family picnic, Timothy is introduced to members of his family: Brenda Best (Rosemarie DeWitt), Cindy's pompous sister; James Green Sr. (David Morse), Jim's estranged father; and Mel (Lois Smith) and Bub (M. Emmet Walsh), Cindy's paternal aunt and uncle. The parents take Timothy to their friend and town botanist, Reggie (Lin-Manuel Miranda), where they learn that Timothy's leaves cannot be removed.

Timothy begins to attend school, where he meets Joni Jerome (Odeya Rush), a girl he encounters during a bullying incident. Jim takes Timothy to confront the bullies and Timothy is invited to a birthday pool party. There, Joni tries to take off his socks and is kicked in the head by Timothy, though they later become friends. Meanwhile, the town's pencil factory, the largest employer in Stanleyville, begins laying off its employees. Timothy convinces Cindy and Jim to design a prototype for a new pencil in an effort to keep the pencil-producing business viable.

Unbeknownst to the parents, one of Timothy's leaves falls off each time he fulfills one of the qualities listed on the original slips of paper. Timothy eventually reveals to Cindy and Jim that his time of existence is short and that he will eventually disappear. During another intense thunderstorm, he vanishes from their house and all they can find of him is the pile of paper slips.

The Greens' meeting with the adoption counselor concludes with Cindy presenting a letter that Timothy left them before leaving. In the letter, he explains to them what he did with each of his leaves that fell off, with a montage sequence showing each person whose life Timothy touched. After an unspecified amount of time, the adoption counselor is shown pulling up to the Greens' house in a car with the little girl who is to become the Greens' daughter, Lily.

== Cast ==
- CJ Adams as Timothy Green. Adams was chosen to be cast in the titular role after working with Hedges in Dan in Real Life.
- Jennifer Garner as Cindy Green, James's wife who works at the Stanleyville local museum.
- Joel Edgerton as James Green, Cindy's husband who works in the pencil factory.
- Odeya Rush as Joni Jerome, Timothy's crush who has a big birthmark above her chest that she's embarrassed about. She is the one who urges Timothy on because he wants to make her happy.
- David Morse as James "Big Jim" Green Sr.
- Rosemarie DeWitt as Brenda Best, Cindy's sister who brags about her own kids.
- Ron Livingston as Franklin Crudstaff, Jim's boss.
- Dianne Wiest as Bernice Crudstaff, Cindy's boss.
- Common as Coach Cal
- Shohreh Aghdashloo as Evette Onat
- M. Emmet Walsh as Uncle Bub
- Lois Smith as Aunt Mel
- Tim Guinee as Marty Rader (voice)
- Lin-Manuel Miranda as Reggie
- James Rebhorn as Joseph Crudstaff
- Michael Arden as Doug Wert
- Rhoda Griffis as Dr. Lesley Hunt
- DeShon Fanaka as Factory Worker (uncredited)
- Dalton Morris as Banquet Hall Patron (uncredited)

== Production ==
In June 2009, Peter Hedges was signed to write and direct the film, which stemmed from an idea brought about by Ahmet Zappa through his production company Monsterfoot Productions. The film is one of the first films produced by Scott Sanders Productions after a deal with the Walt Disney Studios was made in 2007.

Some scenes were shot on location at the Cherokee County Arts Center, located in downtown Canton, Georgia.

== Soundtrack ==
Walt Disney Records released Geoff Zanelli's score from the soundtrack on August 14, 2012, the day before the film's release.

== Reception ==
The Odd Life of Timothy Green was met with a mixed to negative reception. Review aggregator Rotten Tomatoes reports that 36% of 132 critics have given the film a positive review, with a rating average of 5.2/10, offering the consensus: "It means well, but The Odd Life of Timothy Green is ultimately too cloyingly sentimental—and thinly scripted—to satisfy all but the least demanding viewers." Audiences polled by CinemaScore gave the film an average grade of "A-" on an A+ to F scale.

Mary Pols of Time wrote, "This is a movie about old-time values, a movie with Frank Capra aspirations. But Timothy’s life, his very conception by Zappa and Hedges, is definitely more odd than wonderful."

Michael Phillips of the Chicago Tribune, praised the film's art direction and cast, "It's an elegant, honeyed production, photographed (in Georgia) by cinematographer John Toll, and it's full of interesting actors." However, he differed on the script saying, "this fable of the gifted child doesn't go for the throat as it goes about its odd business."

Roger Ebert of the Chicago Sun-Times was more enthusiastic in his 3½ star review, calling it "a warm and lovely fantasy... on a picture-postcard farm in the middle of endlessly rolling hills where it is always Indian Summer" adding that "instead of being simpleminded like too many family films, it treats the characters with care and concern."

=== Box office ===
The film had a $2.3 million debut on August 15. It made $7.6 million in three days and finished the five-day weekend with $15,100,918 domestically. The film grossed $51.9 million in North America.

=== Home media ===
The Odd Life of Timothy Green was released by Walt Disney Studios Home Entertainment on Blu-ray and DVD on December 4, 2012.

=== Accolades ===
Year	Award	Category	Recipient	Result	Ref.
2013	Young Artist Award	Best Performance in a Feature Film - Leading Young Actor Ten and Under	CJ Adams	Won	
2013	Young Artist Award	Best Performance in a Feature Film - Supporting Young Actress	Odeya Rush	Nominated	
