= Sam Paulescu =

American football player (born 1984)

No. 2, 4, 1
- Position: Punter

Personal information
- Born: April 18, 1984 (age 42); Fullerton, California, U.S.
- Listed height: 6 ft 0 in (1.83 m)
- Listed weight: 200 lb (91 kg)

Career information
- College: Oregon State
- NFL draft: 2006: undrafted

Career history
- Winnipeg Blue Bombers (2006); Dallas Cowboys (2007)*; Denver Broncos (2007); Dallas Cowboys (2008); Washington Redskins (2009); Tampa Bay Buccaneers (2009); Washington Redskins (2010); San Francisco 49ers (2011)*
- * Offseason or practice squad member only

Awards and highlights
- First-team All-Pac-10 (2005)

Career NFL statistics
- Games played: 20
- Punts: 102
- Punt yards: 4,306
- Punting yard average: 42.7
- Stats at Pro Football Reference

Samuel Paulescu (Romanian: Păulescu; born April 18, 1984) is an American former professional football player who was a punter in the National Football League (NFL) for the Denver Broncos, Dallas Cowboys, Tampa Bay Buccaneers and Washington Redskins. He played college football for the Oregon State Beavers. Paulescu also played professionally for the Winnipeg Blue Bombers of the Canadian Football League (CFL).

== Early life ==
Born in Los Angeles, California, to Romanian immigrant parents Nick and Persida Paulescu, he was fluent in Romanian before he could speak English. Paulescu played basketball, soccer, track and football at Whittier Christian High School in La Habra, California.

He earned four letters in football and soccer, and two in track and field. In addition to kicking, Paulescu also played wide receiver, running back and defensive back. As a junior, he scored three touchdowns, intercepted two passes and kicked a prep career-best 43-yard field goal in one game. He also scored 17 goals for the soccer team.

As a senior, he was named team defensive MVP and first-team All-Olympic League as a kicker. Paulescu played in the 605 All-Star game in the summer of 2002.

== College career ==
Paulescu accepted a football scholarship from Fullerton College under head coach Gene Murphy in 2003. As a freshman in 2002, he averaged 36.7 yards on 53 punts. His special teams coach was Jim Wren, who was USC's punter in 1996 when Mike Riley was the offensive coordinator.

As a sophomore, Paulescu was the fifth-leading scorer among California Junior College players as a kicker. He scored 73 points in 10 games (37-37 PAT, 12-17 FGs) booted a 57-yard field goal against Santa Monica College, and was perfect on all three attempts over 41 yards. He made a 25-yarder in overtime to give Fullerton a 24-21 win over Riverside City College on November 15. He averaged 45.6 yards on 46 attempts during the regular season, with a long of 84 yards, raising his average to 46.5 yards after three playoff games as a punter. He also bettered his all-time long punt with an 86-yarder against Santa Monica College in the U.S. Bank Beach Bowl on November 22.

He was selected first team All-American by J.C. Grid-Wire and by J.C. Athletic Bureau, earned first-team All-Mission Conference; first-team All-California J.C. Region IV, and first-team All-California as selected by the California Community College Football Coaches Association.

Paulescu transferred to Oregon State University, where as a junior he received honorable-mention All-Pac-10 and OSU Special Teams Co-MVP honors. He began his senior year on the Ray Guy Award watch list and averaged 43 yards per punt, ending his OSU career with 48 punts downed inside the 20-yard line – 24 each season. He was the Pac-10 Special Teams Player of the Week in 2005, after having six punts downed inside the 20-yard line, including two at the 1-yard line, in a win at No. 18 California. He made 21 punts of 50-plus yards during his career, including a career-best of 69 yards against Washington State University in 2004.

As a senior, he posted 56 punts for a 43-yard average and was named to the Pac-10 All-Conference first-team, marking the first punter in OSU history to earn such a distinction. He finished his college career as arguably the top punter in the program's history.

== Professional career ==
=== Winnipeg Blue Bombers (CFL) ===
On June 21, 2006, he signed a contract with the Winnipeg Blue Bombers of the Canadian Football League, to join the team's developmental squad. He was released on July 23.

=== Dallas Cowboys (first stint) ===
On May 1, 2007, he was signed as a free agent by the Dallas Cowboys. He was released on August 3. He was re-signed on August 14. He was waived before the start of the season, after not beating out Mat McBriar for the starting punting job.

=== Denver Broncos ===
On December 28, 2007 the Denver Broncos signed him after releasing Paul Ernster. Paulescu made his debut in week 17 against the Minnesota Vikings, making five punts for a total of 221 yards. He was released on August 30, 2008.

=== Dallas Cowboys (second stint) ===
On October 14, 2008, he was signed by the Dallas Cowboys as a replacement for McBriar, who suffered a broken foot against the Arizona Cardinals and was placed on the injured reserve list. During a home game against the Tampa Bay Buccaneers, he delivered a hard tackle on returner, Clifton Smith, at midfield. He was not re-signed after the season.

=== Washington Redskins (first stint) ===
Paulescu signed with the Washington Redskins on November 6, 2009. After punting in one game on November 8 against the Atlanta Falcons (3 punts, averaging 50 yards per punt). He was waived on November 14.

=== Tampa Bay Buccaneers ===
On December 1, 2009, he was signed by the Tampa Bay Buccaneers due to the injury of Dirk Johnson. He was waived on April 26, 2010.

=== Washington Redskins (second stint) ===
On December 14, 2010, he was signed by the Washington Redskins to replace Hunter Smith, who was cut after letting the snap on a critical extra point attempt go through his hands in a 16-17 loss against the Tampa Bay Buccaneers. He was released on July 28, 2011.

=== San Francisco 49ers ===
On August 22, 2011, Paulescu signed with the San Francisco 49ers. He was waived on August 30.
