= Dan in Real Life =

2007 film by Peter Hedges

- Theatrical release poster
- Directed by: Peter Hedges
- Written by: Pierce Gardner; Peter Hedges
- Produced by: Jonathan Shestack; Brad Epstein
- Starring: Steve Carell; Juliette Binoche; Dane Cook; John Mahoney; Emily Blunt; Dianne Wiest
- Cinematography: Lawrence Sher
- Edited by: Sarah Flack
- Music by: Sondre Lerche
- Production companies: Touchstone Pictures; Focus Features; NALA Films; Jon Shestack Productions
- Distributed by: Walt Disney Studios Motion Pictures (United States and Canada); Focus Features International (International)
- Release date: October 26, 2007
- Running time: 98 minutes
- Country: United States
- Language: English
- Budget: $25 million
- Box office: $68.5 million

Dan in Real Life is a 2007 American romantic comedy drama film directed by Peter Hedges, and stars Steve Carell, Alison Pill, Juliette Binoche, Dianne Wiest, John Mahoney and Dane Cook.

This is the first Touchstone Pictures film to be distributed by Walt Disney Studios Motion Pictures after Disney retired the Buena Vista brand from its distribution division. The film received generally positive reviews from critics and grossed $68 million worldwide.

== Plot ==
Dan Burns is a newspaper advice columnist, author, widower, and single parent to his three daughters, living in North Jersey. Dan and his daughters take a weekend trip to the oceanside Rhode Island home of Dan's parents for an annual family gathering. In attendance are Dan's older brother and sister with their families, as well as Dan's younger brother Mitch, who is known for his carefree lifestyle and robust dating history.

The morning after arriving in Rhode Island, Dan meets Marie in a bookshop and the two are instantly attracted to each other. They spend the morning sharing a pastry over heartfelt conversation, although she gently warns him that she has a new boyfriend and leaves.

Dan returns to his parents' house and announces that he has "met someone,” whereupon the whole family encourages him to "go for it.” Within minutes of this, Mitch introduces his new girlfriend, who turns out to be Marie. The family, and particularly Dan’s daughters, take an instant liking to Marie. Dan is disheartened upon seeing Mitch’s feelings for Marie, and resists his father's advice about looking for love after his wife’s death four years earlier. To avoid awkwardness, Dan and Marie decide against telling the family of their meeting, but spend the next few days in frustration as they realize their instantaneous connection.

Dan butts heads with his middle daughter, Cara, who grows more exasperated with Dan's dismissal of her relationship with her high school boyfriend Marty, whom Cara claims to have fallen in "love" with in three days. Upon his mother's insistence, Dan reluctantly agrees to a blind date with his siblings' once unattractive childhood friend, Ruthie "Pig Face" Draper, who has since grown into a beautiful and successful physician. Mitch and Marie join them for a double date and Dan delights in making Marie jealous of him and Ruthie.

Tension grows between Dan and Marie, culminating at the family's football game and talent show, where Dan plays guitar as Mitch sings "Let My Love Open the Door"; during the bridge and unbeknownst to the family, Dan sings to Marie. Marie, who has been reading Dan's written work over the weekend, tearfully confesses that since meeting Dan she has realized her feelings for Mitch are platonic and cannot bear to keep pretending otherwise. The next morning, Marie breaks up with Mitch and leaves.

Marie later calls Dan and reveals that she is still in town, and they meet at a bowling alley to talk. The meeting evolves into a date and finally a passionate kiss, interrupted when Dan's entire family arrives to bowl and are shocked to find them. Angry and betrayed, Mitch punches Dan in the face and Marie hurries out in tears.

Humiliated, Dan's three daughters angrily turn on him. Mitch, despite his apparent devastation earlier, forgives Dan and immediately rebounds with Ruthie, suggesting that his feelings for Marie had not been very strong to begin with. Dan reconciles with his daughters and is forced to admit that he had fallen in love with Marie within three days, much like Cara and Marty had.

Urged by his daughters, Dan takes them to New York City, where they find Marie at her gym. As he makes eye contact with her, Dan, in voice-over, tells the readers of his advice column that instead of merely planning ahead in life, they should "plan to be surprised."

The film ends with Dan and Marie celebrating their wedding in the backyard of his parents' oceanside home, with the entire family present.

== Cast ==
- Steve Carell as Dan Burns
- Juliette Binoche as Marie Diamond, Mitch's girlfriend and Dan's love interest later new wife
- Dane Cook as Mitch Burns, Dan's younger brother
- John Mahoney as John "Poppy" Burns, Dan's father
- Dianne Wiest as Nana Burns, Dan's mother
- Emily Blunt as Ruthie "Pigface" Draper, Dan's blind date
- Alison Pill as Jane Burns, Dan's eldest daughter
- Brittany Robertson as Cara Burns, Dan's second daughter
- Marlene Lawston as Lilly Burns, Dan's youngest daughter
- Norbert Leo Butz as Clay Burns, Dan's older brother
- Jessica Hecht as Amy Burns, Dan's older sister
- Amy Ryan as Eileen Burns, Clay's wife
- Frank Wood as Howard Wilson, Amy's husband
- Felipe Dieppa as Marty Balasco, Cara's boyfriend
- Bernie McInerney as James Lamson, newspaper proprietor
- Amy Landecker as Cindy Lamson, newspaper editor
- Matthew Morrison as policeman
- Stephen Mellor as bookstore clerk
- Henry Miller as Will Burns, Clay and Eileen's oldest son
- Ella Miller as Rachel Burns, Clay and Eileen's oldest daughter
- Cameron "CJ" Adams as Elliot Burns, Clay and Eileen's youngest son
- Jessica Lussier as Jessica Burns, Clay and Eileen's youngest daughter
- Seth D'Antuono as Gus Wilson, Amy & Howard's son
- Margot Janson as Olivia Wilson, Amy & Howard's oldest daughter
- Willa Cuthrell-Tuttleman as Bella Wilson, Amy & Howard's youngest daughter
- Shana Carr as Suzanne Burns, Dan's late wife
- Lucas Hedges as Lilly's dance partner

== Home media ==
The film was released on DVD and Blu-ray on March 11, 2008.

== Production ==
The film was shot in New Jersey and Rhode Island in the cities of Newport, East Greenwich, West Greenwich, Jamestown, Westerly, and Providence in November and December 2006. The opening scene was filmed at Seven Stars Bakery in Providence. However, the facade of the building and the interior are altered. The first time Dan is pulled over by the Jamestown, Rhode Island police, he is on Ocean Avenue in Newport, Rhode Island. The second time, Dan is pulled over by Mackerel Cove in Jamestown. In scenes filmed in Jamestown, two bridges are clearly visible: the Jamestown Bridge and its replacement, the Jamestown Verrazzano Bridge. Demolition of the Jamestown Bridge was initiated on April 18, 2006. The film also cast local residents of neighboring towns and cities consisting of Middletown, North Kingstown and North Providence as Dan's nieces and nephews. The date scene was filmed in two different places in Westerly. The inside shots were filmed at Alley Katz Bowling Center, while the exterior shots were filmed at Misquamicut Beach. What is now the Windjammer was dressed to look like the outside of the bowling center. The sunset scene with the entire family on the beach was filmed at Napatree Point in Westerly.

== Soundtrack ==
Norwegian singer-songwriter Sondre Lerche composed the majority of the music in the film, and has a cameo appearance in a scene at the end.

Full soundtrack listing:

1. "Family Theme Waltz" - Sondre Lerche
2. "To Be Surprised" - Lerche
3. "I'll Be OK" - Lerche
4. "Dan and Marie Picking Hum" - Lerche
5. "My Hands Are Shaking" - Lerche
6. "Dan in Real Life" - Lerche
7. "Hell No" - Lerche and Regina Spektor
8. "Family Theme" - Lerche
9. "Fever" - A Fine Frenzy
10. "Airport Taxi Reception" - Lerche and The Faces Down Quartet
11. "Dan and Marie Melody" - Lerche
12. "Human Hands" - Lerche and The Faces Down Quartet
13. "I'll Be OK" (Instrumental Reprise) - Lerche
14. "Let My Love Open the Door" - Pete Townshend
15. "Dan and Marie Finale Theme" - Lerche
16. "Modern Nature" - Lerche and Lillian Samdal
17. "Ruthie Pigface Draper" (bonus track) - Dane Cook and Norbert Leo Butz, taken from a scene in the movie

"Mr. Blue Sky" by the Electric Light Orchestra is featured in the TV and radio advertisements for the movie, as well as "Let My Love Open the Door" by Pete Townshend and "Henrietta" by The Fratellis. The club mix of Inaya Day's "Nasty Girl (Vanity 6 song)" and Earth, Wind & Fire's "September '99 (Phats & Small Remix)" are also featured in separate scenes in the movie but are not on the soundtrack. "Human Hands" written by Elvis Costello (the original version appears on his album Imperial Bedroom).

== Reception ==
=== Box office ===
The film opened October 26, 2007 in the United States and Canada, and grossed $11.8 million in 1,921 theaters its opening weekend, ranking #2 at the box office. By the end of its run, the film grossed $68.4 million. It was the first Touchstone movie to be released under the Walt Disney Studios Motion Pictures name following the retirement of the previous Buena Vista Pictures Distribution.

=== Critical response ===
On review aggregator Rotten Tomatoes, the film holds an approval rating of 65% based on 170 reviews, with an average rating of 6.2/10. The website's critical consensus reads, "The fine performances elevate Dan in Real Life beyond its sentimental plot." On Metacritic, the film has a weighted average score of 65 out of 100, based on 34 critics, indicating "generally favorable" reviews. Audiences polled by CinemaScore gave the film an average grade of "B+" on an A+ to F scale.

Some critics described it as a non-holiday holiday film that is derived from that genre and the rom-com genre in general. A. O. Scott of The New York Times wrote "not to expect too much from Dan in Real Life that way you can be pleasantly surprised.".
