= CJ Adams =

American actor

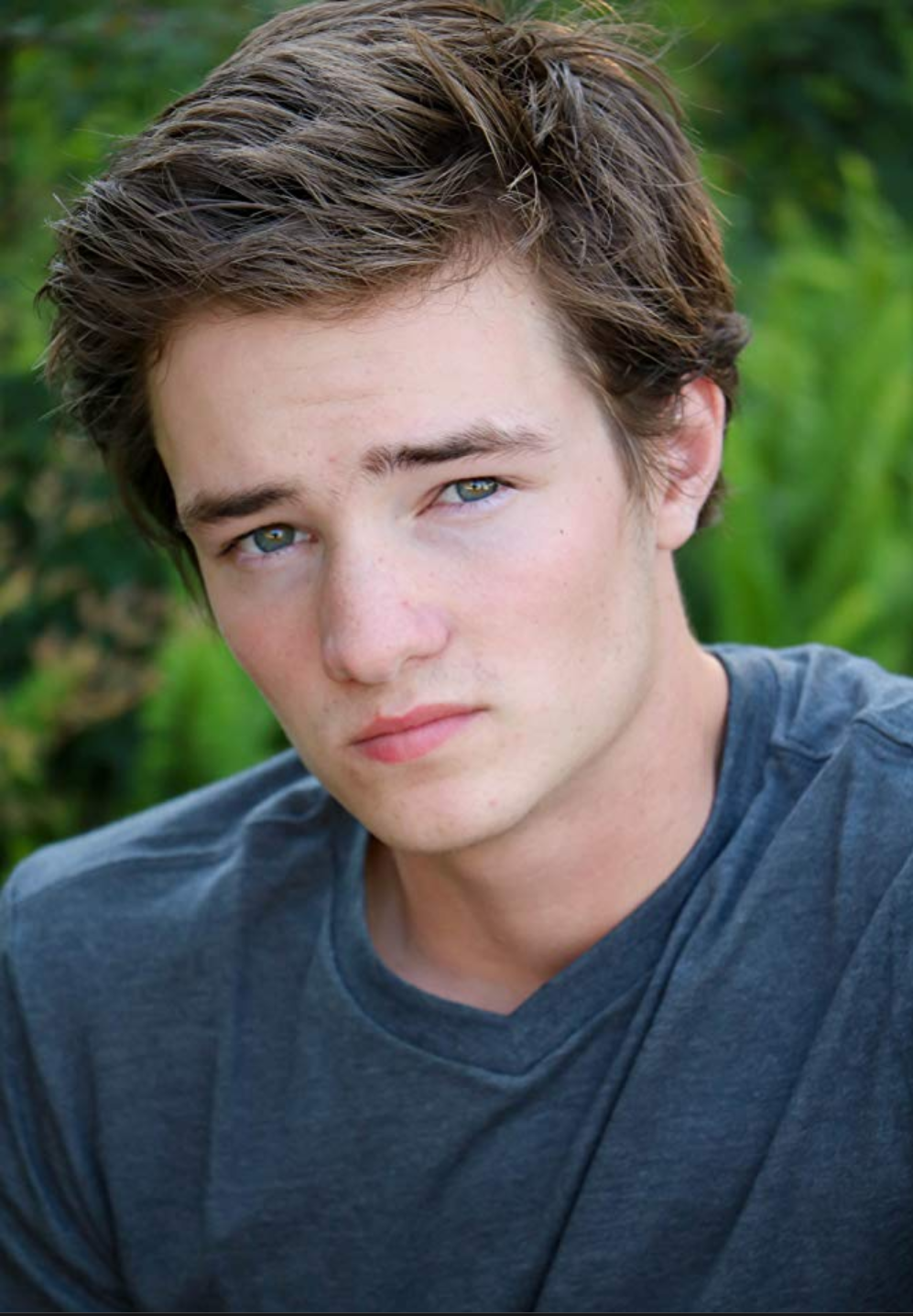
- Adams in 2018
- Born: Cameron John Adams; April 6, 2000 (age 26); Elmhurst, Illinois, U.S.
- Occupation: Actor
- Years active: 2007–2019

Cameron John Adams (born April 6, 2000) is an American former actor. He made his acting debut in the film Dan in Real Life (2007) and became best known for his title role in the film The Odd Life of Timothy Green (2012).

== Early life ==
Cameron John Adams was born in Elmhurst, Illinois, on April 6, 2000, to Donna and Matt Adams. He was raised in Providence, Rhode Island.

== Career ==
Adams played the title character in the 2012 feature film The Odd Life of Timothy Green, which earned him the Young Artist Award for Best Leading Young Actor Age Ten and Under. He previously had a role in the 2007 feature film Dan in Real Life.

== Filmography ==
=== Film ===
Year	Title	Role	Notes
2007	Dan in Real Life	Elliot Burns	
2012	The Odd Life of Timothy Green	Timothy Green	Young Artist Award for Best Leading Young Actor Ten or Under; Nominated—Saturn Award for Best Performance by a Younger Actor
2013	Against the Wild	Zach Wade	
2014	Godzilla	Young Ford Brody	
2014	Friendship is Forever	Anthony Sanders	

=== Television ===
Year	Title	Role	Notes
2013–2014	Chicago Fire	Nathan Marks	3 episodes
2019	Bull	Theo Crawford	Episode: "Safe and Sound"

== Accolades ==
Year	Award	Category	Recipient	Result	Ref.
2013	Young Artist Award	Best Performance in a Feature Film - Leading Young Actor Ten and Under	CJ Adams	Won	
