= Peter Hedges =

American novelist and director (born 1962)

- Born: Peter Simpson Hedges; July 6, 1962 (age 64); West Des Moines, Iowa, U.S.
- Education: University of North Carolina School of the Arts (BFA)
- Occupations: Novelist; playwright; screenwriter; film director; film producer
- Spouse: Susan Bruce Titman (m. 1993)
- Children: 2, including Lucas
- Writing career
- Period: 1984–present
- Notable works: What's Eating Gilbert Grape (novel, 1991); Dan in Real Life (film, 2007)
- Website: peterhedgeswriter.com/ph/

Peter Simpson Hedges (born July 6, 1962) is an American novelist, playwright, screenwriter, film director and film producer.

== Early life ==
Hedges was born in West Des Moines, Iowa, where he was raised, the son of Carole (Simpson), a psychotherapist, and the Rev. Robert Boyden Hedges, an Episcopal priest. His mother left when he was young so he was raised by his single father. He attended Valley High School, where he was involved in the theater department, including the improvisational group and the mime troupe, The Bakers Dozen. He later went to the North Carolina School of the Arts, where he studied drama.

== Career ==
Hedges' novel What's Eating Gilbert Grape was adapted into a critically acclaimed movie of the same title, for which he wrote the screenplay, launching his film career.

In 2002, he was nominated for an Academy Award for Best Adapted Screenplay for About a Boy, alongside Chris and Paul Weitz. In the same year, he wrote and directed Pieces of April, starring Katie Holmes, which he dedicated to his mother.

In 2007, he co-wrote and directed Dan in Real Life.

He wrote and directed The Odd Life of Timothy Green (2012), a film conceived by Ahmet Zappa, produced by Zappa and Scott Sanders, and released by Walt Disney Pictures. In 2018, he wrote and directed the drama Ben Is Back, about drug addiction, starring his son Lucas Hedges, and Julia Roberts.

His latest novel The Heights was published March 4, 2010 by Dutton.

== Personal life ==
His wife is Susan Bruce (Titman), a poet. They have two sons; Simon, who works in private equity in New York, and actor Lucas Hedges.

== Filmography ==
Film

Year	Title	Director	Writer	Producer
1993	What's Eating Gilbert Grape	No	Yes	No
1999	A Map of the World	No	Yes	No
2002	About a Boy	No	Yes	No
2003	Pieces of April	Yes	Yes	No
2007	Dan in Real Life	Yes	Yes	No
2012	The Odd Life of Timothy Green	Yes	Yes	No
2018	Ben Is Back	Yes	Yes	Yes
2021	The Same Storm	Yes	Yes	No

Television

Year	Title	Director	Writer	Consulting Producer	Notes
2021	Ordinary Joe	Yes	Yes	Yes	Episode "The Letter"

== Plays ==
- Oregon (1984)
- Champions of the Average Joe (1985)
- The Age of Pie (1986)
- Andy and Claire (1986)
- Teddy by the Sea (1986)
- Imagining Brad (1988)
- Baby Anger (1993)
- What's Eating Gilbert Grape (Musical) (2024)

== Novels ==
- What's Eating Gilbert Grape (1991)
- An Ocean in Iowa (1998)
- The Heights (2010)
