= Lukas Ettlin =

Swiss film director and cinematographer

Lukas Ettlin (born 1975 in Switzerland) is a director and cinematographer.

== Career ==
Ettlin is a graduate of the New York University Film School.

He is the winner of the 2001 ASC Heritage Award from the American Society of Cinematographers at the beginning of his career.

== Filmography ==
=== Cinematographer ===
Short film

Year	Title	Director	Notes
2000	Genesis and Catastrophe	Jonathan Liebesman	
2002	Fast Forward	Brad Furman	
2003	Special	Cinco Paul; Ken Daurio	
2003	Pirates	Eric McCormack	
2003	Unbroken	Brad Furman	
2003	The Stranger	Brad Furman	Also producer
2005	Rings	Jonathan Liebesman	
2008	Graduation Day	Andrew Gallery	With Kelly Garner
2011	Atlantis	Matthew Ornstein	
2014	Life & Hummus	Alex Matros	Documentary short

Feature film

Year	Title	Director	Notes
2003	The Ghosts of Edendale	Stefan Avalos	
2005	Life on the Ledge	Lewis Helfer	
2005	Southbounders	Ben Wagner	With Philip Andelman and Leif Johnson
2006	The Texas Chainsaw Massacre: The Beginning	Jonathan Liebesman	
2006	The Busker	Stephen J. Croke	
2007	The Take	Brad Furman	
2008	Never Back Down	Jeff Wadlow	
2009	The Killing Room	Jonathan Liebesman	
2009	Shrink	Josh Pate	With Isaac Phillips
2009	Fanboys	Kyle Newman	
2009	Middle Men	George Gallo	
2011	Battle: Los Angeles	Jonathan Liebesman	
2011	The Lincoln Lawyer	Brad Furman	
2013	Evidence	Olatunde Osunsanmi	
2014	Maggie	Henry Hobson	

Music video

Year	Title	Artist	Director
2004	"Personal Jesus"	Marilyn Manson	Nathan Cox
2012	"No Reflection"	Marilyn Manson	Himself

Documentary film

Year	Title	Director	Notes
2005	Buried Alive in the Blues	Brad Furman	With Joshua Reis
TBA	This Is Not Normal	Matthew Ornstein	With Peter Castagnetti, Naiti Gámez and Mathew Rudenberg

TV series

Year	Title	Director	Notes
2003	RAINN Public Service Announcements	Brad Furman	Episode "Unbroken"
2012	Battlestar Galactica: Blood & Chrome	Jonas Pate	TV movie
2014	The Last Ship	Jonathan Mostow	Episode "Phase Six"
2014-15	Black Sails	Neil Marshall; Marc Munden; Steve Boyum; Stefan Schwartz; Alik Sakharov	8 episodes
2015	Aquarius		11 episodes

=== Director ===
Year	Title	Director	Co-Executive Producer	Notes
2015	Aquarius	Yes	No	Episode "(Please Let Me Love You And) It Won't Be Wrong"
2015-2017	Black Sails	Yes	No	5 episodes; Also associate and supervising producer
2016	Power	Yes	No	Episode "I Got This on Lock"
2017	The Arrangement	Yes	No	Episodes "Trips" and "The Betrayal"
2017	Shooter	Yes	No	Episode "The Man Callen Noon"
2017	The Last Ship	Yes	No	Episode "Detect, Deceive, Destroy"
2018	Taken	Yes	No	Episode "Hammurabi"
2018	Krypton	Yes	No	Episode "Hope"
2018	Daredevil	Yes	No	Episode "Please"
2018-2019	Counterpart	Yes	No	Episodes "Point of Departure" and "Shadow Puppets"
2020	Barkskins	Yes	No	Episodes "The Sugared Plum" and "The Black Sun"
2022	Raised by Wolves	Yes	Yes	Episodes "Feeding" and "Happiness"
2023	Jack Ryan	Yes	Yes	Episodes "Triage", "Wukong" and "Proof of Concept"
2024	For All Mankind	Yes	Yes	Episodes "Glasnost" and "Have a Nice Sol"
2024	The Old Man	Yes	Yes	Episode "XV"
2026	One Piece	Yes	No	Episodes "Nami Deerest", "Reindeer Shames" and "Deer and Loathing in Drum Kingdom"

Supervising producer

- See (2019) (8 episodes)
