= The Lincoln Lawyer (soundtrack) =

2011 soundtrack albums

Two soundtracks were released for the 2011 American drama film The Lincoln Lawyer starring Matthew McConaughey and directed by Brad Furman. The first, The Lincoln Lawyer (Original Motion Picture Soundtrack), an album featured the original songs used in the film, were released on March 15, 2011. The second album, The Lincoln Lawyer (Original Motion Picture Score), featured an original score composed by Cliff Martinez, also released on the same date. Lakeshore Records distributed both the albums into digital and physical formats.

== Soundtrack ==
The Lincoln Lawyer (Original Motion Picture Soundtrack)

Soundtrack album by various artists
- Released: March 1, 2011
- Genre: Rap; rock
- Length: 60:38
- Label: Lakeshore

The soundtrack to the film featured songs performed by Bobby Bland, Erick Sermon, Marvin Gaye, Kavinsky, The Miracles, Deadmau5, Kaskade, Marlena Shaw amongst others. According to McConaughey, "the soundtrack for Mick Haller was much different than any other soundtrack I've had, for any other character. That's always fun to go through". He complimented Furman's musical sense on selecting specific songs for the character who provided him 40 songs upon McConaughey's request which helped him with the pace, movement and approach.

The 2010 single "Nightcall" performed by French musician Kavinsky was also featured in the soundtrack of Drive, also composed by Martinez.

=== Track listing ===
| No. | Title | Artist(s) | Length |
|---|---|---|---|
| 1. | "Ain't No Love in the Heart of the City" | Bobby 'Blue' Bland | 03:53 |
| 2. | "Lincoln Lawyer" | Marcus "Seige" White; Big Hollis | 03:18 |
| 3. | "Music" | Erick Sermon; Marvin Gaye | 03:47 |
| 4. | "Don't Sweat The Technique" | Eric B. & Rakim; Marvin Gaye | 04:24 |
| 5. | "Nightcall" | Kavinsky; Lovefoxxx | 04:21 |
| 6. | "Bobblehead Girl" | Danny Chaimson; The 11th Hour | 04:07 |
| 7. | "Now" | Ari Hest | 04:03 |
| 8. | "107 Degrees" | Citizen Cope | 05:11 |
| 9. | "The Wilderness" | Colin Smith | 04:16 |
| 10. | "Hot Lazy Porch Swing" | Cinema Guitar Works | 03:02 |
| 11. | "Suspect" | Setty; The Miracles | 03:46 |
| 12. | "I Remember" | Deadmau5; Kaskade | 09:11 |
| 13. | "Moment Of Truth" | Gang Starr | 04:10 |
| 14. | "California Soul (Lincoln Lawyer Remix)" | Marlena Shaw; Ya Boy | 03:09 |
| Total length: | | | 60:38 |

=== Charts ===
| Chart (2011–2012) | Peak position |
|---|---|
| UK Compilation Albums (OCC) | 77 |
| UK Soundtrack Albums (OCC) | 10 |

== Score ==
The Lincoln Lawyer (Original Motion Picture Soundtrack)

Film score by Cliff Martinez
- Released: March 8, 2011
- Genre: Film score
- Length: 41:16
- Label: Lakeshore
- Producer: Cliff Martinez

Cliff Martinez chronology
| Severe Clear (2010) | The Lincoln Lawyer (2011) | Contagion (2011) |

Cliff Martinez composed the original score for The Lincoln Lawyer. He used a mixture of electronics without the use of synthesizers to provide an ambient score and used recordings of orchestral sounds that have been pitched and stretched beyond recognition to provide an organic score. Most of the orchestral recordings are pitched and detuned without using synthesizers. He further used percussion instrument to amplify the rhythmic and tonal characteristics of the ambient textures and soundscape. Martinez composed nearly 50 minutes of score for the film. The score was released through Lakeshore Records on March 8, 2011.

=== Track listing ===
| No. | Title | Length |
|---|---|---|
| 1. | "How's It Hangin' Counselor?" | 02:24 |
| 2. | "Looks A Little Short To Me" | 02:08 |
| 3. | "How Does Reggie Tell It?" | 04:48 |
| 4. | "We Did A Couple Things Right" | 02:03 |
| 5. | "You're Right, I Killed Her" | 03:11 |
| 6. | "I Can Kick Your Ass" | 00:53 |
| 7. | "You Lied Val" | 01:00 |
| 8. | "Did I Get Frank Killed?" | 02:17 |
| 9. | "I'm A Missionary Man" | 02:37 |
| 10. | "About Those Thousand Razors" | 02:40 |
| 11. | "Woodsman" | 01:08 |
| 12. | "You've Got Someplace To Be" | 01:12 |
| 13. | "I Got This" | 01:02 |
| 14. | "Directed Verdict" | 01:58 |
| 15. | "Whose Side Are You On?" | 01:57 |
| 16. | "Shoot Me Right Now" | 02:20 |
| 17. | "Track Him" | 03:04 |
| 18. | "911, What's Your Emergency?" | 02:20 |
| 19. | "Repeat Customers" | 02:14 |
| Total length: | | 41:16 |
