= The Infiltrator (2016 film) =

2016 film directed by Brad Furman

- Theatrical release poster
- Directed by: Brad Furman
- Screenplay by: Ellen Brown Furman
- Based on: The Infiltrator by Robert Mazur
- Produced by: Paul Brennan; Miriam Segal; Brad Furman; Don Sikorski; Matt Ruskin
- Starring: Bryan Cranston; Diane Kruger; John Leguizamo; Benjamin Bratt; Yul Vazquez; Amy Ryan
- Cinematography: Joshua Reis
- Edited by: Luis Carballar; Jeff McEvoy; David Rosenbloom
- Music by: Chris Hajian
- Production companies: Good Films; Lipsync
- Distributed by: Broad Green Pictures
- Release dates: July 6, 2016 (Tampa Theatre); July 13, 2016 (United States)
- Running time: 127 minutes
- Countries: United Kingdom; United States
- Language: English
- Budget: $28–47.5 million
- Box office: $22.2 million

The Infiltrator is a 2016 biographical crime drama thriller film directed by Brad Furman and written by his mother Ellen Brown Furman. The film is based on the eponymous autobiography by Robert Mazur, a United States Customs Service Special Agent, who in the 1980s helped bust Pablo Escobar's money-laundering organization by going undercover as a corrupt businessman. The film stars Bryan Cranston as Mazur, with Diane Kruger, Benjamin Bratt, John Leguizamo, Saïd Taghmaoui, Joe Gilgun and Amy Ryan in supporting roles.

Filming began on February 23, 2015, in London. Both Mazur and Cranston received executive producer credits. The film premiered at the Tampa Theatre on July 6, 2016, and was released the following week in theaters. The film received a generally positive response from critics, but performed poorly at the box office, grossing $22 million against a budget of $28–$47 million.

== Plot ==
During the 1980s, U.S. Customs Service special agent Robert Mazur uses his undercover alias "Bob Musella" to become a pivotal player for drug lords laundering their dirty cash. Later, he infiltrates the world's largest cartel, and helps expose the money-laundering organization of drug lord Pablo Escobar and take down the Bank of Credit and Commerce International (BCCI), which had secretly taken illegal ownership of First American Bankshares in Washington, D.C.

== Cast ==
- Bryan Cranston as US Customs Special Agent Robert Mazur, undercover alias Bob Musella.
- Juliet Aubrey as Evelyn Mazur
- Diane Kruger as Kathy Ertz
- John Leguizamo as Emir Abreu
- Benjamin Bratt as Roberto Alcaino
- Amy Ryan as Bonni Tischler
- Jason Isaacs as Mark Jackowski
- Joe Gilgun as Dominic
- Daniel Mays as Frankie
- Yul Vazquez as Javier Ospina
- Simón Andreu as Gonzalo Mora Sr.
- Rubén Ochandiano as Gonzalo Mora Jr.
- Olympia Dukakis as Aunt Vicky
- Saïd Taghmaoui as Amjad Awan
- Art Malik as Akbar Bilgrami
- Tom Vaughan-Lawlor as Steve Cook
- Elena Anaya as Gloria Alcaino
- Dinita Gohil as Farhana Awan
- Carsten Hayes as Rudy Armbrecht
- Juan Cely as The Informant
- Andy Beckwith as Joe
- Michael Paré as Barry Seal
- Mark Holden as Eric Wellman

== Production ==
The project was first announced by The Hollywood Reporter on October 8, 2014, with Brad Furman as director and Bryan Cranston as Robert Mazur; Miriam Segal produced the film for her Good Films banner along with George Films. Relativity International was announced to sell the film to foreign distributors at the American Film Market. On February 13, 2015, Diane Kruger was chosen to star for the unspecified female lead role. Benjamin Bratt was selected to star in the film as Roberto Alcaino, the agent's contact who dealt directly with cartel board members, including Escobar. On March 10, 2015, additional cast members were chosen, including John Leguizamo, Amy Ryan, Olympia Dukakis, Elena Anaya, and Juliet Aubrey. Broad Green Pictures acquired the US rights to the film on May 21, 2015.

Cranston and Leguizamo previously worked together in The Lincoln Lawyer, which Furman directed.

=== Filming ===
Filming was previously set to begin in March 2015 in Tampa, Florida, but then moved to London and Paris. According to SSN Insider, filming began on February 23, 2015. On March 11, 2015, the studio confirmed that filming was underway in London and released a first-look image from the film.

The production moved to Florida at the end of April; filming began in Tampa on April 22, 2015, on location at Port Tampa Bay. On April 28, 2015, they filmed in Parkland Estates, near the former home of Santo Trafficante, an infamous Tampa mob boss.

== Reception ==
=== Box office ===
In the United States and Canada, The Infiltrator opened on Wednesday, July 13, 2016, and was projected to gross $5–8 million from 1,600 theaters in its opening five days. The film grossed $773,761 on its first day and $5.3 million in its opening weekend (a five-day total of $6.7 million), finishing eighth at the box office.

=== Critical response ===
As of June 2020, the film holds a 72% approval rating on Rotten Tomatoes based on 179 reviews and an average rating of 6.4/10. The website's critical consensus reads, "The Infiltrator's compelling fact-based story and tremendously talented cast are often just enough to balance out its derivative narrative and occasionally clunky execution." On Metacritic, the film has a score of 66 out of 100, based on 38 critics, indicating "generally favorable reviews". Audiences polled by CinemaScore gave the film an average grade of "A−" on an A+ to F scale.

In The Guardian, Wendy Ide wrote:

Cranston is excellent: we pick up on the barely perceptible flicker of fear in his eyes as he brazenly weaves his story. And Kruger impresses in a crucial supporting role. But the trick with a sting movie is that it should all slot elegantly into place in the final reveal. And for all its gung-ho energy, there’s a cluttered quality to the plotting which means that it doesn’t flow as satisfyingly as it should.

=== Lawsuit ===
In 2016, Javier Ospina Baraya sued Robert Mazur and the makers of the film for what he alleged was a false depiction of him. In 2019 the Florida State Appeals Court ruled the suit could proceed.

== See also ==
- CIA involvement in Contra cocaine trafficking
- Drug barons of Colombia
- War on drugs
