= Chris Thomas Devlin =

American screenwriter

- Occupation: Screenwriter
- Years active: 2015–present
- Notable work: Texas Chainsaw Massacre; Cobweb

Chris Thomas Devlin is an American screenwriter, best known for his work on Texas Chainsaw Massacre (2022) and Cobweb (2023).

== Career ==
In 2015, he began his career by scripting The Wretched Emily Derringer, which appeared on that year's Black List survey. In 2018, Devlin wrote an unsolicited screenplay for the horror film Cobweb (2023). The screenplay was included in 2018's Black List and Blood List. In November 2019, he gained notability when he was hired as a screenwriter on Texas Chainsaw Massacre (2022), which served as a direct sequel to the original film and ignored all other installments of the franchise. The film was met with largely negative critical and audience reviews.

By November 2020, Lionsgate bought Devlin's screenplay for the horror film Video Nasty. In June 2026, Lionsgate reported that they would be releasing a reboot of The Blair Witch Project in 2027, featuring a screenplay by Devlin.

== Filmography ==
Producer

- Hockey Mom (2010)

Actor

- Dr. Harvey or: How I Stole Einstein's Brain and Lost My Mind (2012) (As "Reporter Shemp")

Writer

- Texas Chainsaw Massacre (2022)
- Cobweb (2023)
- The Blair Witch Project (2027)

Special Thanks

- How to Blow Up a Pipeline (2022)
