= The Last Broadcast =

The Last Broadcast may refer to:

- The Last Broadcast (album), a 2002 album by Doves
- The Last Broadcast (film), the 1998 cult horror film
