= Blood List =

Annual film survey

The Blood List was an annual survey of the best unproduced horror and thriller screenplays as voted on by industry professionals. It was created by Kailey Marsh and ran from 2009 to 2022. Films such as Bird Box and Cobweb, as well as the series Severance, originated as speculative scripts on the list years ahead of their production.

== History ==
The Blood List was created by Kailey Marsh in 2009. Its name was a play on the similar Black List. Steve Barton of Dread Central called it "one of the most vital and necessary horror resources you'll ever need to break into the business".

In 2013, the Blood List began offering a script-rating service, with the 10 highest-rated scripts being forwarded to judges for possible inclusion on the Blood List. In 2014, the Blood List partnered with Stage 32 for a contest open to new writers who did not yet have representation.

In May 2024, the Blood List announced it would be discontinued, making the 2022 edition the final one, as the 2023 edition was skipped due to the Writers Guild of America strike.

== Top-rated scripts ==
Year	Title	Author	Ref
2009	The Voices	Michael R. Perry	
2010	Dark Continent	David Portlock	
2011	Maggie	John Scot III	
2012	The Disciple Program	Tyler Marceca	
2013	Ink and Bone	Zak Olkewicz	
2014	Bird Box	Eric Heisserer	
2015	Eli	David Chirchirillo	
2016	Orb	Steve Desmond and Michael Sherman	
2017	Soul Mates	Chris LaMont and Joe Russo	
2018	Cobweb	Chris Thomas Devlin	
2019	Shut In	Melanie Toast	
2020	No individual winner		
2021	No individual winner		
2022	No individual winner		

== Films on the Blood List ==
=== 2009 ===
(11/31 produced)

- Black Swan (2010)
- The Bleeding House (2011) – then titled Country Road
- Buried (2010)
- Grabbers (2012)
- House at the End of the Street (2012)
- Kristy (2014)
- Open Grave (2013)
- The Last Voyage of the Demeter (2023) – then titled Last Voyage of the Demeter
- Psycho Killer (2026)
- Red Riding Hood (2011) – then titled The Girl With the Red Riding Hood
- The Voices (2014)

=== 2010 ===
(2/10 produced)

- Chronicle (2012)
- The Last Witch Hunter (2015)

=== 2011 ===
(3/13 produced)

- The Boy Next Door (2015)
- Maggie (2015)
- Martyrs (2015)

=== 2012 ===
(5/13 produced)

- Arrival (2016) – then titled Story of Your Life
- Before I Wake (2016) – then titled Somnia
- The Blackcoat's Daughter (2015) – then titled February
- Intruders – then titled Shut In
- Stephanie (2017)

=== 2013 ===
(3/13 produced)

- The Autopsy of Jane Doe (2016)
- The Monster (2016) – then titled There Are Monsters
- Patient Zero (2018) – then titled Patient Z

=== 2014 ===
(4/13 produced)

- Bird Box (2018)
- He's Out There (2014) – then titled Scarecrow
- Leatherface (2017)
- Tau (2018)

=== 2015 ===
(6/13 screenplays produced; 2/4 pilots produced)

- The Babysitter (2017)
- Bed Rest (2022)
- Blood Drive (2017) – TV pilot
- Bullet Head (2017) – then titled De Niro
- Eli (2019)
- Mercy Black (2019) – then titled The Boy
- Shut Eye (2016–17) – TV pilot
- We Summon the Darkness (2019)

=== 2016 ===
(4/19 screenplays produced; 1/3 pilots produced)

- I Think We're Alone Now (2018)
- Severance (2022–25) – TV pilot
- Soul Mates (2023)
- Summer of 84 (2018)
- Watcher (2022) – then titled The Watcher

=== 2017 ===
(6/21 screenplays produced; 0/3 pilots produced)

- His House (2020)
- The Lodge (2017)
- The Other Lamb (2019)
- Soul Mates (2023) (Note: Repeated entry from 2016 list.)
- The Swallow (2026)
- Till Death (2021)

=== 2018 ===
(3/15 screenplays produced; 0/3 pilots produced)

- Cobweb (2023)
- The Inheritance – then titled The Last Will and Testament of Charles Abernathy
- Prey for the Devil (2022) – then titled The Devil's Flame

=== 2019 ===
(3/12 screenplays produced; 0/5 pilots produced)

- The Apology (2022)
- Don't Worry Darling (2022)
- Shut In (2022)

== See also ==
- List of highest-grossing horror films
