= Runner Runner =

- Theatrical release poster
- Directed by: Brad Furman
- Written by: Brian Koppelman; David Levien
- Produced by: Arnon Milchan; Jennifer Davisson Killoran; Leonardo DiCaprio; Michael Shamberg; Stacey Sher; Brian Koppelman; David Levien
- Starring: Justin Timberlake; Gemma Arterton; Anthony Mackie; Ben Affleck
- Cinematography: Mauro Fiore
- Edited by: Jeff McEvoy
- Music by: Christophe Beck
- Production companies: Regency Enterprises; New Regency; Appian Way Productions; Double Feature Films
- Distributed by: 20th Century Fox
- Release dates: September 18, 2013 (Las Vegas); October 4, 2013 (United States)
- Running time: 91 minutes
- Country: United States
- Language: English
- Budget: $30 million
- Box office: $62.7 million

Runner Runner is a 2013 American crime thriller film directed by Brad Furman, written by Brian Koppelman and David Levien and starring Justin Timberlake, Ben Affleck, Gemma Arterton and Anthony Mackie.

The film was released in the United States on October 4, 2013, received generally negative reviews from critics, and grossed $62 million.

== Plot ==
Richie Furst used to have a lucrative career on Wall Street; this history prevents him from receiving tuition assistance at Princeton, so he funds his master's degree by referring students to online gambling, for which he receives a cut. After the dean threatens to expel him for these activities, Richie tries to win his tuition using his excellent poker skills in online gambling, but he loses all his money to a cheater, something he can prove by statistics.

Richie travels to Costa Rica to confront Ivan Block, who runs the biggest empire of online gambling websites in the world, including the one Richie lost his money on. After Ivan sees the statistics, he finds that coders have modified the software to allow them to cheat. After firing those involved, Ivan tells Richie he will pay him millions per year to stay in Costa Rica and assist with the site.

Richie slowly begins a romantic relationship with Rebecca Shafran, ex-lover of Ivan, who appears to have no objections. Ivan has Richie blackmail a gaming affiliate with videos of his infidelity to force him to sign with Ivan. FBI Agent Shavers kidnaps Richie and threatens to ruin his life in various ways if he does not assist in getting Ivan convicted. Shavers cannot do anything legally as he has no authority in Costa Rica, but he takes advantage of this to use tactics that would be illegal and unethical for law enforcement inside the U.S. Ivan tells Richie that everyone in the organization ends up confronted by Shavers at some point.

Over time, Ivan's organization is revealed to be less than ethical. He sends Richie to bribe Costa Rica gaming director Herrera with too small a payment, which leads to Richie being beaten. Ivan tells him it comes with the territory of such a lucrative career. When Richie tries to leave the country, Shavers has drugs planted in his bag and offers to overlook them if Richie agrees to cooperate. A local police officer reveals that the police dislike Ivan but that he would buy his way out of any trouble and destroy whoever tried to take him down.

Richie's friend Andrew Cronin, who works on the software design for Ivan, suggests that Ivan is running a Ponzi scheme; the players' accounts have no actual money, and Ivan uses the money as his bank account, keeping just enough to allow players to cash out when they need to. Aware that Richie might be wanting out, Ivan buys the massive poker debts of Richie's father and brings him to Costa Rica, using him as a hostage.

Ivan throws Herrera and his bodyguard into the river to get eaten by the crocodiles but pulls them out before they are eaten. Cronin disappears and is later found nearly beaten to death. Thanks to Rebecca betraying Ivan, Richie finds out that he has been setting him up all along; Ivan is about to move his operations out of Costa Rica, planning to leave Richie behind as the fall guy. Richie gives out massive bribes to local officials, including low-level police officers. When the moving day hits, Ivan calls to sarcastically apologize to Richie, telling him he will be busted, as Ivan flies away on a private jet.

When Ivan lands, he finds he has been betrayed: the bribed pilot has instead flown him to Puerto Rico, an American territory. Shavers and other FBI agents move in to arrest him as Richie and Rebecca fly away on the private jet. Shavers says they are free to go because Richie left a flash drive for him containing sufficient evidence to convict Ivan.

== Cast ==
- Justin Timberlake as Richie Furst
- Gemma Arterton as Rebecca Shafran
- Anthony Mackie as Agent Shavers
- Ben Affleck as Ivan Block
- Michael Esper as Billy "Pet" Petricoff
- Oliver Cooper as Andrew Cronin
- Christian George as Wilson
- Yul Vazquez as Delegate Herrera
- John Heard as Harry Furst
- James Molina as Esteban
- Louis Lombardi as Archie
- Vincent Laresca as Sergeant Barrancas
- Bernie O. Ramos Robledo as Handlebar Mustache
- Sam Palladio as Shecky
- David Costabile as Professor Hornstein
- Jordan Beder as Paul Arnaud
- Bob Gunton as Dean Alex Monroe
- Ben Schwartz as Craig
- Dayo Okeniyi as Lionel

== Production ==
Principal photography took place in the summer through the winter of 2012 in Puerto Rico and on the Princeton University campus. Despite the fact the film has several graphic indications that all events are taking place in Costa Rica none of the scenes were shot in the Central America nation.

== Reception ==
=== Box office ===
In its opening weekend, the film came in third place with $7.8 million behind Gravity and Cloudy with a Chance of Meatballs 2. It grossed $19.3 million in North America and $43.4 million in the rest of the world for a worldwide total of $62.7 million.

=== Critical response ===
On Rotten Tomatoes, Runner Runner holds a rating of 8% based on 120 reviews, with an average rating of 4.1/10. The website's critical consensus reads, "It has an impressive cast and an intriguing premise, but Runner Runner wastes them on a bland, haphazardly assembled thriller with very little payoff." On Metacritic the film has a weighted average score of 36 out of 100, based on 31 critics, indicating "generally unfavorable reviews". Audiences surveyed by CinemaScore gave the film an average grade of "C" on an A+ to F scale.
