= Lance Weiler =

American film director

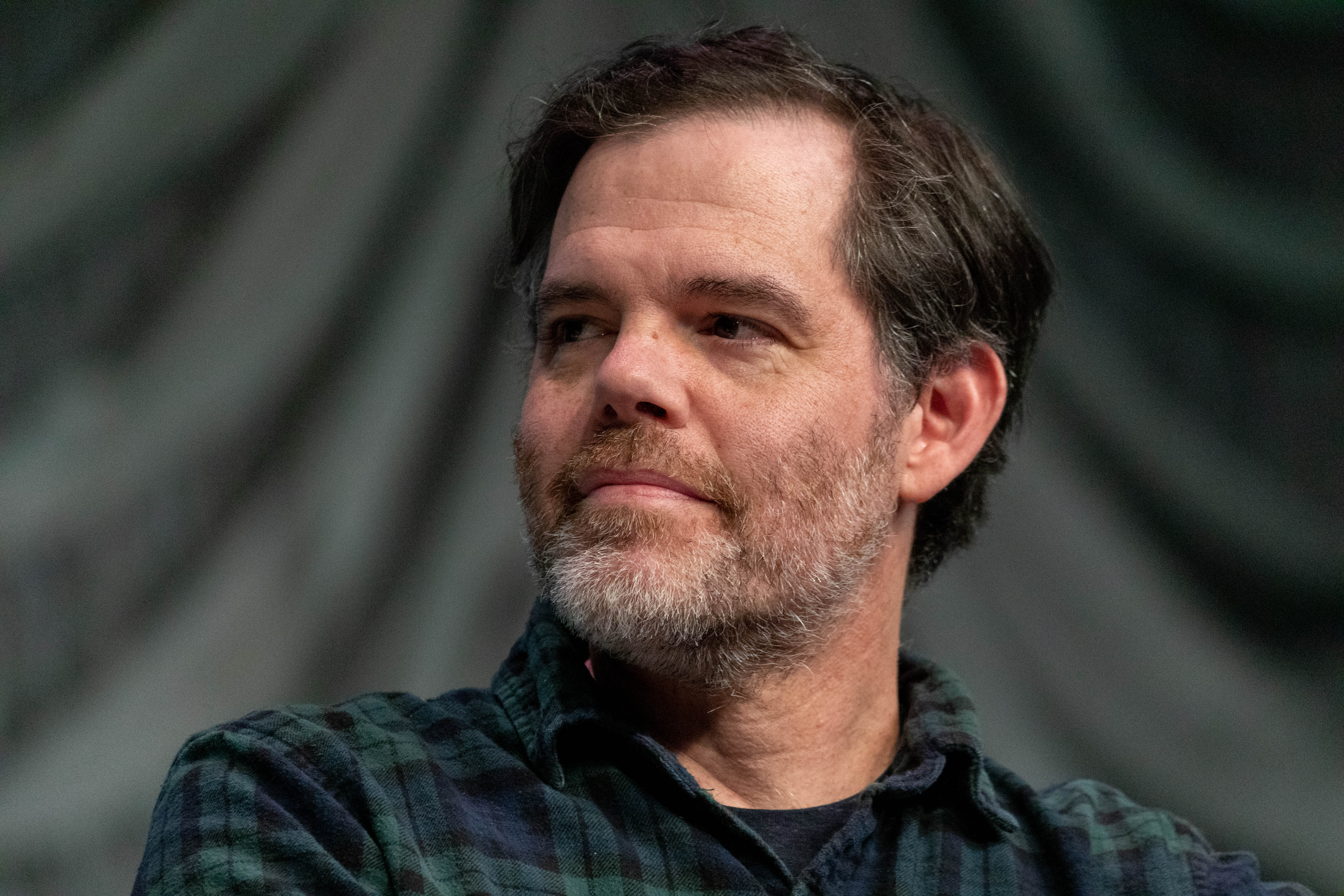
- Weiler in 2019
- Born: United States
- Occupations: Film director, writer, experience designer, educator

Lance Weiler is an American filmmaker and writer from Pennsylvania, and the Director of the Digital Storytelling Lab at Columbia University School of the Arts. He first was known for The Last Broadcast (1997), a found footage horror film which he co-wrote, co-produced, co-directed, and co-starred in with Stefan Avalos. The Last Broadcast made cinematic history on October 23, 1998 as the first all-digital release of motion picture to be stored and forwarded via geosynchronous satellite. Initially working as an assistant cameraman and camera operator on large commercial shoots, in Pennsylvania and later New York City, Weiler is known for increasing work in experimental combinations of film, AI, gaming, and related media.

== Biography ==
Lance Weiler started in filmmaking by working as an assistant cameraman and camera operator on commercial shoots. In 1997, he teamed up with Stefan Avalos to co-write, direct, produce and star in a horror film, The Last Broadcast, based on the technique of found footage.

In 2005, Weiler wrote, directed, and co-produced his second film, Head Trauma, also a thriller. It premiered at the Los Angeles Film Festival in 2006. It had a 17-city DIY digital theatrical run before hitting stores and retail outlets nationwide on DVD.

Weiler developed a cinema ARG (alternate reality game) around Head Trauma. Over 2.5 million people played the game via theaters, mobile drive-ins, phones and online. In recognition of these cinematic gaming innovations, BusinessWeek ranked Weiler in 2009 as "One of the 18 Who Changed Hollywood".

With his writing partner Chuck Wendig, Weiler wrote Collapsus: The Energy Risk Conspiracy, which received an International Emmy nomination for best Digital Fiction in 2011. In 2010, Weiler and Wendig attended the Sundance Screenwriters Lab with their script for HiM. At Sundance 2011, Weiler released Pandemic 1.0, a transmedia experience playing out across film, mobile, web and a live experience.

In 2019, Weiler premiered Where There's Smoke at the Tribeca Film Festival. The 1,400 sq ft installation was a combination of an immersive documentary and an escape room. "Over 100 movies screened at the 2019 Tribeca Film Festival, but one of its best offerings lets you walk inside the frame and experience a story from the inside out." reported IndieWire calling it Weiler's "Most Poignant Work Yet.". Where There's Smoke won a Digital Dozen: Breakthroughs in Storytelling award in April 2020.

=== Other projects ===
Weiler founded the content creator resource The Workbook Project and network, the discovery and distribution film festival From Here to Awesome, and a complimentary conference series, DIY Days. Weiler wrote a column on digital media-related topics at the Blog Herald from 2006 to 2007. He is a regular columnist for Filmmaker magazine. His column entitled "Culture Hacker" deals with the intersection of tech and entertainment.

Weiler was selected for two World Economic Forum steering committees, one on the future of content creation and another on digital policy. He is part of the Cinema Research Institute think tank on the future of film at NYU and is a Professor of Practice at Columbia University School of the Arts where he teaches on the art, craft and business of storytelling in the 21st century.

== Influence ==
Weiler's work has been featured in Time, Forbes, and Wired, and on television programs such as Entertainment Tonight and CNN. His first feature, The Last Broadcast, is distributed in more than 20 countries. It is the first all-digital release of a motion picture to theaters nationwide; it also has been aired on HBO and IFC. To date, The Last Broadcast, a self-distributed effort, has grossed 5 million dollars worldwide via self-distribution.

In the fall of 2013, Weiler created an immersive storytelling/play experience entitled Body/Mind/Change, which launched at the TIFF Bell Lightbox in Toronto at its film festival. The project was a collaboration with David Cronenberg, the Toronto International Film Festival, and Canadian Film Centre media lab. Body/Mind/Change was scheduled to travel to museums around world over the following four years. Designed to capture players' and viewers' data within the experience, the project is the first of its kind.

In an interview with Fast Company, Weiler said,

"It plays into the whole data movement and our obsession with it and the narcissistic qualities of it. As you’re playing the experience, we're collecting certain data points, and in the museum space we're 3-D printing PODs based on your emotional intelligence. Data is being generated about our lives all the time, so I thought it would be fun to play with that idea of quantified self but have it manifest in something real".

From 2014 to present, Weiler has co-created immersive adaptions of the novels Sherlock Holmes and Frankenstein. These works combine the Internet of Things and artificial intelligence in an effort to augment creativity and encourage collaborative storytelling. Sherlock Holmes & the Internet of Things has more than 2,500 collaborators from 60 countries. To date, more than 150 self-organized events related to these subjects have been staged around the world. Lance started prototyping a new immersive storytelling experience that mixes Mary Shelley's Frankenstein with AI and Machine Learning. In 2018, Frankenstein AI premiered at the Sundance Film Festival in the New Frontier Section becoming one of the first artificial intelligence projects to ever show at the festival.

In addition to making feature films, Weiler directs commercials and music videos. He often lectures at universities and film societies about the changing landscape of content creation and distribution. He has spoken at the Cannes, Berlin, and Sundance film festivals; and has consulted for large ad agencies, entertainment companies and corporations.

Weiler is a founding member of the Digital Storytelling Lab, established in 2013 at Columbia University. It is designed to explore the current and future landscape of storytelling.

== Selected films, series, games and interactive projects ==
- The Last Broadcast (1998, producer, co-writer, actor, co-director)
- Head Trauma (2006, producer, co-writer, director)
- RADAR - 42 episodes (2009 to 2011, co-creator, producer)
- Collapsus: The Energy Risk Conspiracy (2010 co-writer and narrative designer)
- Pandemic 1.0 (2011, co-creator, co-writer, director and experience designer)
- Robot Heart Stories (2011, 2012 - creator and experience designer)
- Bear 71 (2012 - co-created installation and social narrative designer)
- Wish for the Future (2012 - creator and experience designer)
- Body Mind Change (2013–2017 - creative director and experience designer)
- My Sky is Falling (2013–present - executive producer)
- Lyka's Adventure (2013–2016 - creator and experience designer)
- Sherlock Holmes & the Internet of Things (2014–present - co-creator, creative director and experience designer)
- Frankenstein AI (2017–present co-creator, creative director and experience designer)
- (de)escalation room (2017–present co-creator, creative director and experience designer)
- Where There's Smoke (2018–present creator, experience designer)
- The Raven (2019 co-creator, co-writer and director)
- From the Futures (2020–present co-creator, creative director and experience designer)
- Project Immerse (2020–present co-creator, creative director and experience designer)
- Blockchain Fairy Tales (2021–present co-creator, creative director and experience designer)
