= Collapsus =

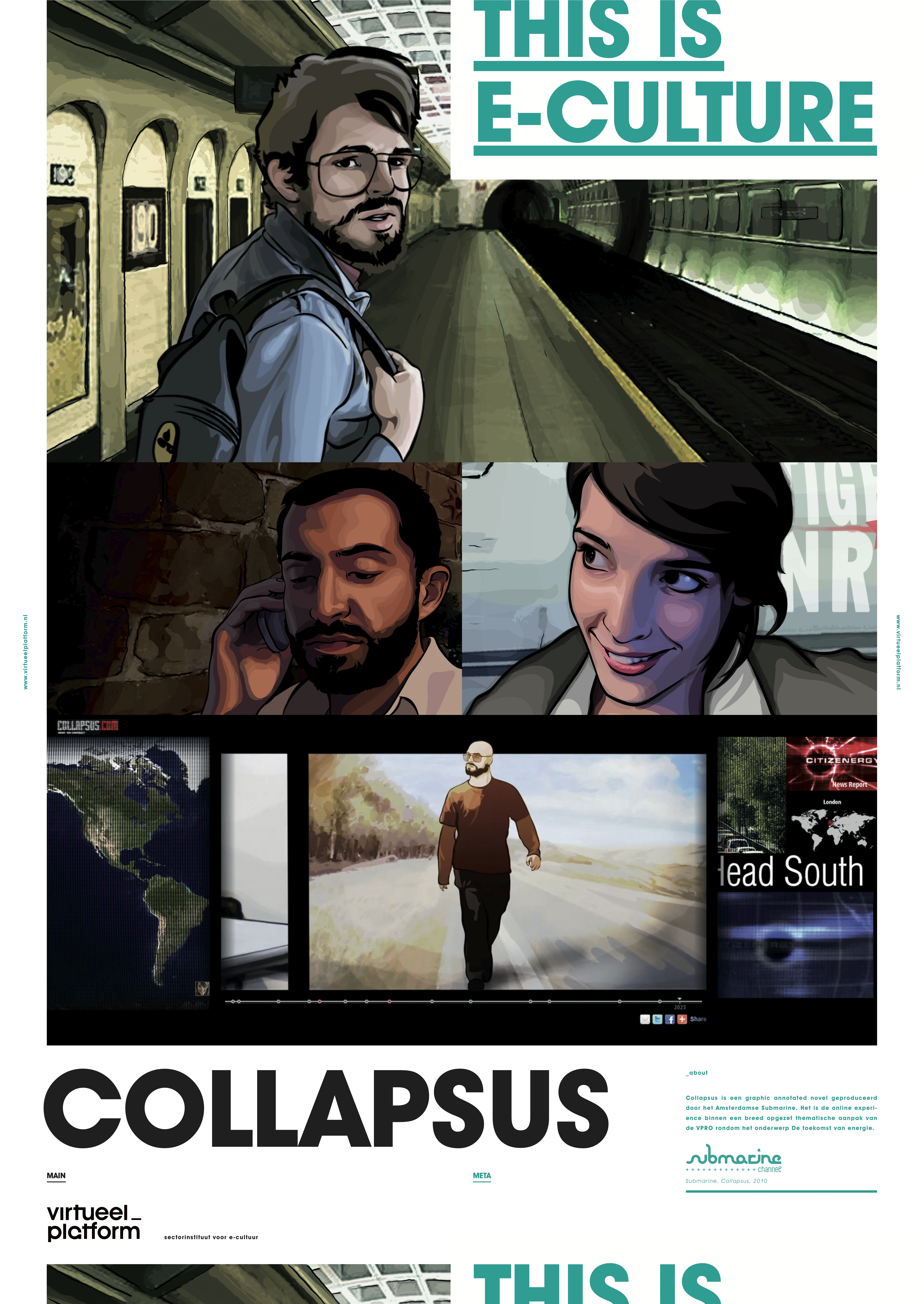
promotion poster

Collapsus is a project that combines animation, interactive fiction, and documentary film. This story follows how the impending energy crisis affects ten young people, while international powers battle with political dissension and a fearful population during transition from Fossil fuel to alternative fuels. Set in the near future, Collapsus was initialized to raise awareness of the global issue of peak oil.

== Content ==
The project combines Video blogging, interactive maps, fictional newscasts, live action footage, and animation to immerse the player in the narrative, an example of Transmedia storytelling. The project requires the player to access and assess additional information and make decisions about the world's energy production at both a national and global scale.

== Production ==
Collapsus was developed by Submarine Channel, with the Dutch public broadcaster VPRO, who produced the associated Energy Transition documentary the project is based on. Collapsus is directed by Tommy Pallotta, who produced A Scanner Darkly (film) and Waking Life.

Collapsus blends live action and the rotoscoping animation technique, co-developed by Pallotta, and used in Waking Life and A Scanner Darkly (film).

Collapsus was written by Lance Weiler and Chuck Wendig. In 2011 Collapsus was nominated for an International Emmy in the Digital Fiction category.
