= Tommy Pallotta =

American film director and producer (born 1968)

Tommy Pallotta (born May 25, 1968, in Houston, Texas) is an American film director and producer.

== Biography ==
Pallotta received a degree in philosophy from the University of Texas at Austin. There, he met Richard Linklater and began his film career as an actor and production assistant on Linklater's directorial debut, Slacker (1991). After working on numerous films and commercials, Pallotta wrote, directed and produced his first film, The High Road (1997). He also produced several of Bob Sabiston's animated projects including: Roadhead (1999), which received the Best Animation award at the Aspen Film Festival; a series of interstitials for MTV; Snack and Drink (1999), a three-minute short about an autistic child in a 7-Eleven store, which is now part of the permanent collection of the New York Museum of Modern Art; and Figures of Speech (2000), a series of interstitials for PBS.

He then connected his animation experience with Linklater in Waking Life (2001). Waking Life was the first independently financed and produced computer animated feature. The film was subsequently nominated for three Independent Spirit Awards, including Best Picture.

Pallotta also directed the first machinima produced music video, In the Waiting Line (2003), using the animation engine from the Quake 3 video game, and the rotoscoped MTV "Breakthrough Video" Destiny (2002), both for the band Zero 7. The Microsoft Research and Development team recognized Pallotta for his "penchant for innovation" where he helmed an interactive project based on Jonathan Lethem's novel Amnesia Moon (2004), which was an experiment that was not released to the public.

He then returned to the film industry with his frequent collaborator, Linklater, to produce A Scanner Darkly (2006) based on the novel of the same name by Philip K. Dick and starring Keanu Reeves. Pallotta's newest production is a transmedia thriller based around Energy and Peak Oil called Collapsus, directed by Tommy Pallotta and developed by Submarine Channel.

== Selected filmography ==
- High Road (1996, producer and director)
- Roadhead (1999, producer)
- Snack and Drink (2000, producer)
- Figures of Speech (2000, producer)
- Waking Life (2001, producer)
- Hell House (2001, associate producer)
- Destiny (video) (2002, director)
- In the Waiting Line (video) (2003, director)
- A Scanner Darkly (2006, producer)
- American Prince (2009, producer and director)
- Boyhood (2013, producer)
- Apollo 10 1/2: A Space Age Childhood (2022, producer)
