= Maggie (film) =

- Theatrical release poster
- Directed by: Henry Hobson
- Written by: John Scott 3
- Produced by: Colin Bates; Joey Tufaro; Matthew Baer; Bill Johnson; Ara Keshishian; Trevor Kaufman; Arnold Schwarzenegger; Pierre-Ange Le Pogam
- Starring: Arnold Schwarzenegger; Abigail Breslin; Joely Richardson
- Cinematography: Lukas Ettlin
- Edited by: Jane Rizzo
- Music by: David Wingo
- Production companies: Grindstone Entertainment Group; Gold Star Films; Lotus Entertainment; Silver Reel; Matt Baer Films; Sly Predator
- Distributed by: Lionsgate Films; Roadside Attractions
- Release dates: April 22, 2015 (Tribeca); May 8, 2015 (United States)
- Running time: 95 minutes
- Countries: United States; Switzerland
- Language: English
- Budget: $1.4 million
- Box office: $1.6 million

Maggie is a 2015 American post-apocalyptic horror drama film directed by Henry Hobson, in his directorial debut, and written by John Scott. It stars Arnold Schwarzenegger, Abigail Breslin, and Joely Richardson. Schwarzenegger’s role in the movie marked a dramatic departure from the action film roles which made him famous.

The film was originally set to premiere at the 2014 Toronto International Film Festival, but Lionsgate bought the American distribution rights and pulled the film out of the festival's roster. It instead premiered at the 2015 Tribeca Film Festival on April 23, 2015, as part of its lineup, followed by a limited theatrical release and simultaneous VOD release on May 8, 2015.

== Plot ==
In the present-day Midwest United States, society struggles to function in the aftermath of a zombie pandemic (Necroambulism) barely under control. Maggie Vogel calls her father from a broken city under curfew; her voicemail urges that he not seek her and that she loves him. Her arm was bitten. Knowing she has only weeks before the "Necroambulist virus" turns her cannibalistic, she leaves home to protect her family. Maggie's father Wade has searched for two weeks, despite her warning. Finding her in a hospital for the infected, he brings Maggie home to care for her until she must eventually be quarantined. During their return, a zombie attacks Wade at an abandoned gasoline station and he breaks its neck.

At home, Maggie's younger half-siblings Bobby and Molly are leaving to stay with their aunt. Maggie talks to Bobby, who mostly understands what she is undergoing. She withdraws from her family, struggling to cope with her hopeless situation and torn about contacting her friends. Falling from a swing, she breaks a finger on her infected arm, from which black fluid oozes. Terrified, even though she feels little to no pain, and despairing over her condition, Maggie cuts off the finger. She flees outside and encounters a neighbor, Nathan, and his young daughter, both senseless with infection. Wade kills both zombies but feels extreme remorse. The responding sheriff and deputy consider Wade blameless, instead blaming Nathan's wife Bonnie, who hid her infected family from the authorities. Bonnie visits Wade that night, decrying the dehumanizing treatment of the infected and revealing that Nathan had locked himself in with his sick daughter, becoming infected himself, rather than abandon her to death among strangers in quarantine.

A sympathetic doctor lies to Maggie and on her medical report about the progress of her infection, but warns Wade that, if he wishes to spare Maggie quarantine, he will have to euthanize her himself, either with an extremely painful drug cocktail, or by "making it quick". Wade and Maggie make the most of their remaining days, reminiscing about Maggie's deceased mother. Despite Maggie's physical deterioration (she's woken by maggots wriggling in her dying arm) she struggles to maintain normality. She attends a bonfire with a high school friend, Allie, and an infected boy, Trent, whom Maggie previously dated, and whom she kisses. He tells rumors of horrible conditions at the quarantine facilities, saying he would die before going there.

One day, Maggie smells food near her stepmother Caroline, though Caroline smells nothing and muses that Wade must be cooking downstairs. Finding the kitchen empty, Caroline realizes in horror that Maggie has begun to smell living flesh, in this case Caroline's, as food. Maggie receives a desperate call from Trent. At his home, Trent has locked himself inside his bedroom after he too felt hunger smelling another human, his father. Maggie tries to comfort him but watches helplessly as the police forcibly remove Trent to quarantine.

Back home, Maggie encounters a trapped fox in the woods. Later she runs into her home, hysterical and coated in blood, admitting through tears to her frightened parents that she wanted to free the fox but then couldn't stop herself from attacking it. Wade shoots the half-eaten fox. Caroline departs and urges Wade it's time Maggie is taken away. Two officers arrive and Wade fights one of them before Maggie appears, assuring them she has not yet turned. The sympathetic sheriff leaves Wade with a warning that he'd better decide what to do with her before they next come to check on Maggie.

Wade shows Maggie white daisies he's grown in her mother's old garden, "Daisy" being a nickname he sometimes uses for Maggie. She thanks him for the garden's beauty, but also begs him to promise that he will "make it stop" before she grows worse. Later, Wade sits alone with his shotgun, still unable to use it. He pretends to sleep when Maggie approaches, her skin now gray and her eyes blackened. She lingers over him, smelling him, seemingly on the edge of self-control, before kissing his forehead. Maggie goes outside. Wade, seeing a shell on the floor, puts it in the shotgun. Maggie has climbed to the roof and jumps off, her last memories being of herself as a child frolicking outdoors with her mother, picking a daisy.

== Cast ==
- Arnold Schwarzenegger as Wade Vogel
- Abigail Breslin as Marguerite “Maggie” Vogel
- Joely Richardson as Caroline Vogel
- Douglas M. Griffin as Sheriff Ray Pierce
- J. D. Evermore as Deputy Holt
- Rachel Whitman Groves as Bonnie
- Jodie Moore as Dr. Vern Kaplan
- Bryce Romero as Trent
- Raeden Greer as Allie
- Aiden Flowers as Bobby Vogel
- Carsen Flowers as Molly Vogel
- Dana Gourrier as woman in scrubs

== Production ==
The original screenplay for Maggie, written by John Scott 3, won the Thriller/Horror category Gold Prize in the 2010 PAGE International Screenwriting Awards competition, and as a result was brought to the attention of director Henry Hobson. The following year, the script landed on the Black List of "most liked scripts." Chloë Grace Moretz was initially attached to the project but dropped out due to scheduling conflicts. 'The film is the directing debut of Henry Hobson, whose previous works were designing the title cards of other films such as Sherlock Holmes (2009) and Robin Hood (2010) and video games like The Last of Us (2013), along with the title cards for the 86th and 87th Academy Awards, and commercials for Halo, Resistance 3, and Xcom. Hobson chose Schwarzenegger as a sort of "shorthand" for a protective father, which allowed the film to avoid having to shoot scenes establishing him as such. Hobson also enjoyed the idea of casting the actor against type, explaining "when Arnold came up, it was a really intriguing idea; he’s been the hero in everything he’s done, and to now use that against him and have him be a father who has failed to protect his family was a really intriguing idea—to use his strongest qualities as a kind of narrative aid". Filming started on September 23, 2013 in New Orleans, Louisiana, and ended on October 25, 2013. The film's shooting schedule lasted 25 days. Hobson produced more than 200 pages of storyboards to guide his actors throughout the film.

== Release ==
=== Marketing ===
On March 25, 2015, the trailer for Maggie was released on YouTube, receiving 4 million views in 4 days, with director Henry Hobson also releasing the trailer on his Vimeo account. For the film's release in the Philippines by Pioneer Films on May 13, 2015, the poster was heavily modified to exaggerate the few action elements in the film, such as the inclusion of the tagline "Don't Get Bitten". Limited edition posters were also produced for the US market.

=== Theatrical ===
Maggie premiered at the 2015 Tribeca Film Festival on April 22, 2015. The film was theatrically released in limited theaters in the US on May 8, 2015, and in the UK on July 24, 2015.

=== Home media ===
The film was released on DVD on July 7, 2015.

== Reception ==
=== Critical response ===
Although Maggie received mixed reviews, critics praised Schwarzenegger's and Breslin's performances, with critics surprised by Schwarzenegger's ability as a dramatic actor, capable of delivering a very tragic and touching performance, rather than only being an action film actor. On Rotten Tomatoes, the film has a rating of 61%, based on 135 reviews, with a weighted average rating of 5.8/10. The site's critical consensus reads, "Maggie lurches a bit clumsily at times, but is partially redeemed by strong performances and an unexpectedly thoughtful tone." On Metacritic, the film has a score of 52 out of 100, based on 30 critics, indicating "mixed or average reviews".

Christopher Bourne of Twitch Film, reviewing from the 2015 Tribeca Film Festival, states that Schwarzenegger "delivers one of his finest and most effective performances here, the most dialed back and restrained he's ever been. He brings surprising nuance and depth to his role as a father who desperately fights to preserve his last moments with his daughter, and who suffers considerable agony at his inability to reverse or ameliorate Maggie's inevitable decline", and adds that his dramatic turn "suggests his capability for a wider range of roles as he approaches his seventies and is less able to take on the physical demands of the action hero roles that he has been known for."

Perri Nemiroff of Collider, who gave the film a mixed review, notes that Schwarzenegger "won’t ever completely shake the super tough exterior, but he certainly comes across as a very relatable, loving father here", and that Breslin "gets a nice assist from the eerily natural zombie transformation makeup, but it’s her ability to move between selling Maggie as a strong young woman trying to keep it together for her family and also being downright terrified that makes the performance especially heart wrenching." However, she ultimately states that the film "is just one big missed opportunity. Hobson’s certainly got potential, but his determination to highlight the characters’ misery through dim visuals and super sad faces winds up completely sucking the life out of the concept."

Grayson Hamilton of Popzara.com was more enthusiastic than most, saying the film "regains speed and ends at the perfect moment, without need to pander to the audience or stretch for a longer screen time", while adding "the level of emotional heft is rare for a Schwarzenegger film, but the action icon carries it better than any other performance of his entire career."

Drew McWeeny of Hitfix provides an overall negative review of the film, saying of Schwarzenegger's role, "we finally have a real performance to judge as Arnold is stripped of pretty much everything he's ever been able to rely on in his work. The result is a close-up study of his limitations as an actor, and a genuinely sad piece of work that he handles well." McWeeny also comments, "Breslin does solid work as a girl who has to grapple with the idea that she will not be able to enjoy the joys of adulthood, and who knows full well what her suffering is going to do to her father.... I honestly wish I liked the film more, but at this point, we've seen a whole lot of zombie movies, and while this one tries to find a new way into the idea, it doesn't do anything particularly new."

== See also ==
- Blood List
- I Am Legend
