= Workbook Project =

The Workbook Project (WBP) is an online community and network with an emphasis on film, design, video games, and transmedia storytelling. It was founded by writer-director Lance Weiler in 2006. It provides resources, advice, and documentation from the community with a focus on the process of funding, creating, distributing and sustaining creative projects. Its goal is to help extend the story of any project, while giving value to the project and its audience. Within the WBP are five individual branches that all feed back into the larger Workbook Project community. Those branches include: WBPLabs, New Breed, Culture Hacker, RADAR, DIY DAYS.

WBP host a yearly Discovery and Distribution Award which is designed to fund and provide distribution for a film, musician or designers.

The most recent project from WBP, Pandemic 1.0, which premiered at Sundance Film Festival 2011, was an example of Weiler bringing in the community of WBP to collaborate on and participate with the project.
