= The Ghosts of Edendale =

- Directed by: Stefan Avalos
- Written by: Stefan Avalos
- Produced by: Marianne Connor
- Starring: Paula Ficara; Stephen Wastell; Andrew Kirsanov
- Cinematography: Lukas Ettlin
- Edited by: Stefan Avalos
- Release date: 2003
- Running time: 90 minutes
- Country: United States
- Language: English

The Ghosts of Edendale is a 2003 low budget supernatural thriller film written and directed by Stefan Avalos. It is distributed by Warner Brothers. The film was shot in Silver Lake, Los Angeles, California and was shot entirely on video.

== Plot ==
Kevin and Rachel move to Los Angeles to follow their dream – making it in cinema. They can't believe their luck when they find the perfect house on a hill called Edendale – right next door to Hollywood. Here, all the neighbors are in "the business", and they have high hopes for Kevin and Rachel.

But Rachel's dreams soon turn to nightmares. First, there's something hiding in the closet, then, the awful crying in the walls, and now, Kevin is acting strange. Terrified, Rachel thinks she must be going crazy – but could her insanity extend to the hill itself?

As the neighbors eagerly await the completion of Kevin's work, Rachel must convince him to leave this place before the powerful Ghosts of Edendale reach through time to possess his very soul.

== Cast ==
- Paula Ficara as Rachel
- Stephen Wastell as Kevin
- Andrew Kirsanov as Nolan
- Keith Fulton as Julian
- Louis Pepe as Alex
- Patrick Hasson as Fred
- Ethan Grant as Andrew
- Nathan Lum as ghost boy
- Jay Brown as homeless man
- Robert Lane as Edward Habert
- Maureen Davis as Rose
- Cynthia King as beautiful blonde
- Arthur Guzman as cowboy ghost
- Conor McCarthy as ghost photographer
- Terry A. O'Connell as making fire ghost
- Christine Charters as ghost with jewelry box
- Michael Kowalski as ghostman
- Scott Hale as ghost man
- Casey Schatz as ghost man
- Marianne Connor as party guest
- Amy D'Alio as party guest
- Richard Clark as party guest
- Anthony Happel as party guest
- Stephen J. Croke as party guest
- Caitlin McCarthy as party guest
- Esther Jantzen as party guest
- Christopher Morden as party guest
- Joseph Wicen as party guest
- Shannon Paapanen as party guest

== Production ==
The Ghosts of Edendale retraces film history in the actual locations it was shot. The story of Tom Mix, his life and death, is an integral part of the narrative and also functions as a historical window into "Hollywood lore".

== Reception ==
On review aggregator website Rotten Tomatoes the film has a score of 80% based on reviews from 5 critics, with an average 6.8/10 rating.

== See also ==
- List of ghost films
