= The Other Lamb =

2019 film directed by Małgorzata Szumowska

- Theatrical release poster
- Directed by: Małgorzata Szumowska
- Written by: Catherine Smyth-McMullen
- Produced by: David Lancaster; Stephanie Wilcox; Aoife O'Sullivan; Tristan Orpen Lynch; Marie Gade Denessen
- Starring: Raffey Cassidy; Michiel Huisman; Denise Gough
- Cinematography: Michał Englert
- Edited by: Jarosław Kamiński
- Music by: Paweł Mykietyn
- Production companies: Rumble Films; Subotica Entertainment; Zentropa Belgium
- Distributed by: IFC Midnight (United States); MUBI (United Kingdom)
- Release dates: 6 September 2019 (TIFF); 3 April 2020 (United States)
- Running time: 97 minutes
- Countries: United States; Ireland; Belgium
- Language: English
- Box office: $7,385

The Other Lamb is a 2019 horror film directed by Małgorzata Szumowska and written by Catherine Smyth-McMullen. It stars Raffey Cassidy, Michiel Huisman and Denise Gough.

== Plot summary ==
Selah is a teenage girl who is living in a remote forest compound belonging to a polygamist cult. The cult's messianic leader, the Shepherd, is the only male in the group. The women are divided into two groups: the younger Sisters, who dress in shades of blue, and the older Wives, who dress in reddish tones. The group raises sheep for food and sacrificial rituals. As she matures, Selah has become more of a focus of the Shepherd's attention, and she appears drawn to him. She frequently wonders about her mother, who died giving birth to her.

After fighting with one of the Sisters, Selah is ordered to deliver leftovers to a small, dark hut, where menstruating females are sent because they are considered "unclean". Here she encounters Wife Sarah, who was banished to the hut for unspecified reasons. Sarah, whose chest is covered with scars, warns Selah of the Shepherd's violent tendencies.

One night, Selah overhears a police officer telling the Shepherd that the group must leave. The Shepherd announces that he will be leading the women on a journey to a new home. During the walk, the Wives discover that Selah is menstruating, and she is forced to the back of the group with banished Wife, Sarah. Selah befriends Sarah, who explains that she and Selah's mom were the Shepherd's first two wives. Sarah tells Selah that her mother did not die in childbirth, but instead contracted an infection a few days afterward and died of sepsis because the Shepherd would not take her to the hospital. Sarah admits that she has no faith in the Shepherd, but stays because she has no place else to go. During the arduous journey, Selah begins to doubt his judgement. When she sees a car driving on a road, she has a fantasy of herself inside it, dressed as a normal teenager.

During the strenuous hike one of the pregnant Wives goes into labor, and she dies in childbirth. The Shepherd plucks the dead Wife's grieving young child off of the unlit funeral pyre, and throws her to the ground. After the funeral, Sarah tells Selah that she is leaving with the baby, who the Shepherd had wanted to abandon in the wilderness because the baby was "born wrong". Sarah reveals that the Shepherd wanted to abandon the healthy baby because "there can only be one ram in a flock". Meanwhile, the Shepherd beats one of the Sisters, Tamar, for refusing to lead the group after announcing that she spotted a potentially promising location ahead, further eroding Selah's trust.

The group arrives at a forested valley with a large lake, which the Shepherd declares will be their new Eden. The Sisters’ faith has been shaken by the journey, but the Shepherd rebaptizes the older Sisters. Selah has visions of him attempting to drown her. Around the campfire the Wives decline dinner, stating they are fasting for their ritual the next day.

That night, the Shepherd chooses Selah to be with him. Selah resists when he chokes her, by putting his hand in her mouth during sex. Afterwards, she dreams of eating the Shepherd with the other women. She tells the other girls a story about rebellion, even though story-telling is forbidden.

The next morning, the Sisters awake to find the Wives missing. They go to the lake to find the Shepherd kneeling near the Wives' robes. He tells them that the Wives have ascended into a new life and the Sisters must replace them. Selah confronts him, telling him, "You are not our shepherd!" He smacks her and she hits him back. Some time later, police officers discover the bodies of the Wives washed up on the shore of the lake. They also discover the Shepherd's dead body suspended between two trees, a pair of ram's horns placed on his head like a faun. The Sisters, led by Selah, congregate at the waterfall near their original compound.

== Cast ==
- Raffey Cassidy as Selah
- Michiel Huisman as Shepherd
- Denise Gough as Sarah
- Kelly Campbell as Hannah
- Eve Connolly as Adriel
- Isabelle Connolly as Eloise

== Production ==
Catherine Smyth-McMullen developed the screenplay in 2016 as part of the Film Victoria Catapault Lab, based on her short story 'The Other-faced Lamb', published in Aurealis Magazine in 2015. The script appeared on the 2017 Black List, Hit List and Blood List as one of the year's best unproduced scripts, before being optioned by Stephanie Wilcox, VP of Rumble Films.

In February 2019, it was announced Raffey Cassidy, Michiel Huisman and Denise Gough had joined the cast of the film, with Małgorzata Szumowska directing. Principal photography began that same month in County Wicklow, Ireland.

== Release ==
The film had its world premiere at the Toronto International Film Festival on 6 September 2019 as a Special Presentation. It subsequently screened in competition at the San Sebastián International Film Festival, where it competed for the Golden Seashell, and at the BFI London Film Festival, where it competed in Official Competition. It also screened at acclaimed genre festival Fantastic Fest. Shortly after its TIFF premiere, IFC Midnight and Mubi acquired US and UK distribution rights to the film, respectively. It was released in the United States on 3 April 2020, with distribution shifted to VOD following pandemic-related theatre closures. It was released in the United Kingdom on 16 October 2020.

== Reception ==
=== Box office ===
The Other Lamb grossed a total of $7,385 worldwide ($6,024 in the United States, and $1,361 internationally). It was only released on one screen due to pandemic-related theatre closures, causing its distribution to be shifted to VOD.

=== Critical reception ===
The Other Lamb received generally favourable reviews upon release. On Rotten Tomatoes the film has an approval rating of 75% based on reviews from 108 critics, with an average rating of 6.7/10. The website's critics consensus reads "Smartly directed by Malgorzata Szumowska, The Other Lamb uses a young woman's coming-of-age story to explore the powerful hold cults can have on their followers." On Metacritic it has a weighted average score of 64 out of 100, based on reviews from 18 critics, indicating "generally favorable reviews".

The Hollywood Reporter's Deborah Young called the film "hitting a sweet spot between The Handmaid's Tale and cult horror," adding that Szumowska's "command of her medium makes the film a pleasure to watch." Writing for SlashFilm, Marisa Mirabal described the screenplay as "a fierce and striking depiction of resiliency" with "a poignant relevancy which has reverberated throughout history." Christopher Machell of CineVue called it "a visceral, Atwoodian journey" and "as much an examination of narcissism and the existing structures of gendered power as it is of the limits of faith."

=== Accolades ===
| Award | Category | Recipient | Result |
|---|---|---|---|
| Australian Writers' Guild (AWGIE Awards) | Best Feature Film – Adaptation | Catherine Smyth-McMullen | Nominated |
| San Sebastián International Film Festival | Golden Seashell – Best Film | Małgorzata Szumowska | Nominated |
| BFI London Film Festival | Best Film – Official Competition | Małgorzata Szumowska | Nominated |
| Istanbul Film Festival | Golden Tulip – International Competition | Małgorzata Szumowska | Nominated |
| A Night of Horror International Film Festival | Best Film | Producers | Won |
| A Night of Horror International Film Festival | Best Screenplay | Catherine Smyth-McMullen | Won |
| Fantastic Planet: Sydney Sci-Fi and Fantasy Film Festival | Best Feature | Małgorzata Szumowska | Won |
| Fantastic Planet: Sydney Sci-Fi and Fantasy Film Festival | Best Screenplay | Catherine Smyth-McMullen | Won |
| Sydney Women's International Film Festival | Best Feature Film | Małgorzata Szumowska, Catherine Smyth-McMullen, Producers | Won |
| ReFrame | ReFrame Stamp – Narrative Feature | | Won |
