= Contagion (soundtrack) =

Contagion (Original Motion Picture Soundtrack)

Film score by Cliff Martinez
- Released: September 6, 2011
- Recorded: 2011
- Studio: Eastwood Scoring Stage, Warner Bros.
- Genre: Film score; orchestral; contemporary classical; ambience
- Length: 45:26
- Label: WaterTower Music
- Producer: Cliff Martinez

Cliff Martinez chronology
The Lincoln Lawyer (2011)	Contagion (2011)	Drive (2011)

Contagion (Original Motion Picture Soundtrack) is the album consisting of original score composed by Cliff Martinez for the 2011 film Contagion, directed by Steven Soderbergh. The film marked Martinez and Soderbergh reuniting for the first time after nine years, since Solaris (2002). The score consists of orchestral elements which were incorporated, and being fused with the predominantly electronic sounds of the score. Several pieces of the score had been written with the influences of temp music used by Soderbergh in the edits. The score consisting of 20 tracks was released by WaterTower Music on September 6, 2011, while the vinyl edition was released on October 20, 2017 by Real Gone Music.

== Development ==
Soderbergh recruited his former collaborator and composer Cliff Martinez to score music for Contagion. Given that the pacing of the music was one of Soderbergh's biggest concerns, Martinez had to maintain a brisk pace throughout the soundtrack, while also conveying fear and hope within the music, admitting that: "I tried to create the sound of anxiety. And at key, strategic moments I tried to use the music to conjure up the sense of tragedy and loss. And lastly, the music helped to create a more hopeful tone as dark clouds begin to lift in the final act."

"...my contribution, my instincts about where to go just came from the idea of combining all three of those temp things, I thought it just became more interesting – plus I had written a bunch of stuff during The French Connection era, during the Tangerine Dream era, that I was attached to and didn’t want to throw out. All these were combined into a retro-modern hybrid and that was the kind of style that was made the Contagion score interesting for me."

— Cliff Martinez

As with several Soderbergh's ventures, he used a temp music in some of the rough cuts of his films, with Martinez admitting that it "gives a lot of information about the placement, style, harmonic language". For Contagion, Martinez received a rough cut of the film in October 2010 with music from The French Connection (1971) and Marathon Man (1976), which he loved it as they were "pretty dissonant, scary orchestral cues" and wrote few pieces referencing those styles. Martinez used older composition techniques such as twelve-tone technique for writing those pieces.

Few months later, Martinez received a temp music influenced by German electronic group Tangerine Dream, and wrote few pieces using analog synthesizers as it sounded "cold and scientific" that complimented the story. In the final versions, Soderbergh changed the edit with contemporary film music that "emphasized rhythm and energy". He combined those three approaches and written a score influencing it, as each had its merits, and felt that "combining them would not only be effective but would give the score a style all its own".

The piece "Get Off the Bus" was first written for the film, whose genesis came from his very first email communication with Soderbergh who told him as Contagion being a "horror film", he urged him to check out the "dissonant" opening for The Battle of Algiers scored by Ennio Morricone; Martinez called it as "a musical assault, as like someone thrusting some extremely pungent and stinky but delicious cheese in your face" and admitted that he would compose the score in a dissonant and screeching way for the film entirely, if he was approved to do so. Martinez, backtracked the decision as he did not receive a considerable feedback from the director.

== Track listing ==
No.	Title	Length
1.	"They're Calling My Flight"	3:02
2.	"Chrysanthemum Complex"	2:36
3.	"Placebo"	0:25
4.	"Move Away From The Table"	1:49
5.	"The Birds Are Doing That"	1:35
6.	"Get Off The Bus"	2:03
7.	"100 Doses"	1:46
8.	"Affected Cities"	2:48
9.	"Bad Day To Be A Rhesus Monkey"	2:25
10.	"I'm Sick"	1:29
11.	"Get Us To The Front Of The Line"	2:00
12.	"Don't Tell Anyone"	2:13
13.	"Forsythia"	2:48
14.	"It's Mutated"	2:22
15.	"Merry Christmas"	1:39
16.	"They Didn't Touch Me"	2:02
17.	"There's Nothing In There"	1:52
18.	"Handshake"	4:16
19.	"Bat & Pig"	2:39
20.	"Contagion"	3:37
Total length:		45:26

== Reception ==
Filmtracks.com wrote "Contagion is an extremely simplistic score with few highlights. It almost sounds as though Martinez is trying to accomplish for the 2000s what David Shire did for thrillers in the 1970s, but with only a fraction of the intelligence in the result. There is absolutely zero narrative flow to Contagion, defying any logical notion that the score begin tonally and disintegrate as panic ensues. It's simply bland from start to finish and adds nothing but basic background noise to the concept. Those who found some merit in Martinez's prior two scores of 2011 may be able to zone out to this music, though there are moments of intolerable noise to punctuate scenes of fright. The buzzing alarm clock sound effect that occupies the entirety of "Placebo" has to be among the most insufferable noises in recent film score history. Martinez is proving himself to be a one-trick pony, a reliable composer for atmospheric dissonance of a contemporary tone, but one whose music is increasing obnoxious in its inability to mature and adapt." Peter Bradshaw of The Guardian complimented Martinez's score as "pulsing, driving".

Bogdan Fedeles of The Tech wrote "Soderbergh brings in his long time collaborator Cliff Martinez to pen an exquisite score — a perfect coagulant for the ever-branching plot lines. The music, an original blend of techno-rave with elements of electronic and spectral music, is more reminiscent of computer games than blockbuster movies, yet it is an uncanny fit for Contagion." Todd McCarthy of The Hollywood Reporter mentioned that Martinez's "score hums along very helpfully and without cliches". Beth Accomando of KPBS felt that Martinez's score "sets the tense mood but never serves up cheap emotional punctuation". praised Martinez's work, saying "propulsive electronic score is reminiscent of the recent work of another former rocker, Trent Reznor, and is almost as forceful".

== Credits ==
Credits adapted from AllMusic.

- Composer, producer – Cliff Martinez
- Additional music – Gregory Tripi, Mac Quayle
- Recording, mixing – Dennis S. Sands
- Mastering – Stephen Marsh
- Music editor – Sam Zeines
- Pro-tools operator – Adam Olmsted
- Executive producer – Steven Soderbergh
- Art direction – Sandeep Spiram

Instruments

- Bassoon – Judy Farmer, Ken Munday
- Cello – Dane Little, David Low, Dennis Karmazyn, Erika Duke, Paul Cohen, Rudy Stein, Tim Landauer, Andrew Shulman
- Clarinet – Don Foster, Phil O'Connor, Stuart Clark
- Double bass – Bruce Morgenthaler, Chris Kollgaard, Drew Dembowski, Ed Meares, Francis Liu, Geoff Osika, Tim Eckert, Mike Valerio
- Erhu – Martin St-Pierre
- Flute – Steve Kujala, Heather Clark
- French Horn – Barbara Currie, Brian O'Connor, Daniel Kelley, Jenny Kim, Joe Meyer, Justin Hageman, Mark Adams, Bill Lane, Jim Thatcher
- Oboe – Chris Bleth, David Weiss
- Trombone – Bill Reichenbach, Phil Teele, Steve Holtman, Alex Iles
- Trumpet – Rob Schaer, Tim Morrison, David Washburn
- Tuba – Doug Tornquist
- Viola – Alma Fernandez, Andrew Duckles, Darrin McCann, David Walther, Keith Greene, Laura Pearson, Lynne Richberg, Roland Kato, Shawn Mann, Brian Dembow
- Violin – Ana Landauer, Anatoly Rosinsky, Armen Anassian, Bruce Dukov, Charlie Bisharat, Clayton Haslop, Eun-Mee Ahn, Jackie Brand, Josefina Vergara, Kevin Connolly, Lorand Lokuszta, Miwako Watanabe, Neli Nikolaeva, Nina Evtuhov, Peter Kent, Phillip Levy, Radu Pieptea, Rafael Rishik, Roger Wilkie, Sara Parkins, Serena McKinney, Songa Lee, Susan Rishik, Wes Precourt, Endre Granat

Orchestra

- Orchestrator, conductor – Randy Miller
- Contractor – David Low
- Concertmaster – Mark Robertson

Management

- Executive in charge of music (Warner Bros. Pictures) – Carter Armstrong, Niki Sherrod, Paul Broucek
- Executive in charge (WaterTower Music) – Jason Linn
- Music business affairs executive – Lisa Margolis
