= Stefan Avalos =

American filmmaker and musician

- Born: United States
- Occupations: Film director, Writer, Producer

Stefan Avalos is an American filmmaker, musician, and journalist, best known for his work in film. Together with Lance Weiler, he made The Last Broadcast (1997), a horror film based on found footage. The two men wrote, directed, starred in, and produced the film together. It was shown at film festivals, winning the Best Feature Film Silver Prize at the Chicago Underground Film Festival.

Trained as a classical violinist, Avalos performed as a soloist with, among others, the Philadelphia Orchestra.

== Biography ==
Avalos studied classical violin from childhood, but by early high school, he realized his true love was film. He made amateur movies in high school and studied filmmaking in college.

He has worked in many aspects of the film business, producing and directing commercials for foreign television, as well as working for numerous American clients. These included Rescue 911, Frontline, and MTV. In 1993, he wrote, produced, and directed his first feature film, 'The Game' (also known as The Money Game).

Together with Lance Weiler, he made The Last Broadcast (1997), a horror film based on found footage. Later, partnering with Esther Robinson and David Beard, Avalos created Wavelength Releasing. In October 1998, Wavelength Releasing made the first fully digital national theatrical release of a feature film via satellite: The Last Broadcast.

In 1999, The Last Broadcast was the first feature motion film to be screened digitally at the Cannes Film Festival.

Avalos has lectured in Europe, the United States, South America, Japan, and Canada about digital filmmaking, and written articles about it for numerous publications.

In 2004, Avalos made the supernatural thriller, The Ghosts of Edendale. Other work includes animation for Lost in La Mancha (2002), a documentary directed by Keith Fulton and Louis Pepe.

In 2007, Avalos was instrumental in investigating and breaking the story about "foreign levies" not being disbursed by the DGA and WGA to filmmakers for FADE IN MAGAZINE. He later became a representative for independent writers in the settlement case against the WGA.

In 2012, Avalos was the exclusive documentarian for the "Paris Double Blind" experiment.

In 2017, Avalos directed, produced, edited, and shot the feature documentary, Strad Style. It follows the work of an Ohio man in trying to build a Stradivarius-quality violin for a highly ranked Romanian violinist. It premiered at Slamdance Film Festival. It won the Grand Jury Award and Audience Award for Best Feature Documentary.

In 2018, Avalos was invited to join Array inc. as Director At Large in a series of experiments demonstrating and developing emergent A.I. technology for motion picture and television special effects.

In 2019, Avalos began development on ATM BOY, a story discovered by Australian Crime Journalist Adam Shand.

== Honors ==
Stefan Avalos was recognized in 1997 as "one of the twenty-five people helping to reinvent entertainment" by Wired magazine.

Stefan Avalos was nominated for the Maysles Award at the Denver Film Festival in 2017.
