= Henry Hobson (director) =

English film director

Henry Hobson is an English film director, known for the 2015 film Maggie.

== Early life ==
Hobson was born in Salisbury, Wiltshire, England. Hobson completed his Bachelor of Arts degree at The London College of Printing and did his master's degree at the Royal College of Art. He began his career as a graphic designer, creating title sequences for films such as Snow White and the Huntsman, Robin Hood, Sherlock Holmes. and The Lone Ranger. He also worked on the popular television series The Walking Dead. He spent over 15 years in this field before transitioning to directing.

== Career ==
=== Maggie ===
Maggie, an independent thriller about a viral pandemic, featured Arnold Schwarzenegger in a rare dramatic role as a father trying to protect his infected daughter. The film was based on a script by first-time screenwriter John Scott and was completed with a $1.4 million budget. Schwarzenegger joined the project as both actor and producer after being intrigued by the story. The film premiered at the Tribeca Film Festival in 2015.

His background in visual arts has strongly influenced his approach to filmmaking. His use of visual storytelling is one of the movie's defining features.

=== 87th Oscars ===
Hobson designed most of the visual elements for 87th Academy Awards' category introductions. Hobson had worked at the Oscars since 2009 and was tasked with creating distinctive and stylish title sequences for twenty-three out of the twenty-four 2015 ceremony categories. His contributions included the 3D elements for the visual effects category and creative transitions like makeup swipes for the acting categories. One standout moment was the Best Picture montage, which cleverly blended iconic imagery from Birdman and Selma. His slide for American Sniper featured bullets tearing across the screen to form the American flag. Another highlight was Birdman, where a black watercolour sketch dissolved into a flock of birds. These creative designs demonstrated Hobson's ability to push boundaries while staying true to the spirit of each film.
