= The Last Broadcast (film) =

- DVD cover
- Directed by: Stefan Avalos; Lance Weiler
- Written by: Stefan Avalos; Lance Weiler
- Produced by: Stefan Avalos; Lance Weiler
- Starring: Stefan Avalos; Lance Weiler; David Beard; Jim Seward
- Music by: Stefan Avalos; A. D. Roso
- Distributed by: Wavelength Releasing
- Release dates: March 9, 1998 (Doylestown, Pennsylvania); October 23, 1998 (United States)
- Running time: 86 minutes
- Country: United States
- Language: English
- Budget: $900 (estimated)
- Box office: $12,097 (U.S. theatrical)

The Last Broadcast is a 1998 American found footage horror film written, produced and directed by Stefan Avalos and Lance Weiler, who also star in the film. Told in a pseudo-documentary format and employing the found-footage technique, the fictional film appears to tell the story of a man convicted in 1995 of murdering the members of his team during an expedition to find the mythic Jersey Devil in the New Jersey Pine Barrens.

The film was among the first feature-length productions shot and edited entirely using consumer-level digital equipment. The film premiered at the County Theater in Doylestown, Pennsylvania, on March 9, 1998, before receiving a wider U.S. theatrical release on October 23, 1998.

== Plot ==
The film deals with documentary film-maker David Leigh, and his investigation of the Fact or Fiction murders. In this case, a pair of cable TV hosts of public-access television were murdered in mysterious circumstances. The body of one was never found. Leigh seeks to discover the truth behind these killings while making his documentary.

Fact or Fiction is a show dealing with unsolved mysteries and the paranormal. Its two hosts are Steven "Johnny" Avkast and Locus Wheeler. (Although it was initially a success, Leigh's later investigations find that the show is failing and is threatened with imminent cancellation.) At this point Avkast comes up with the idea of a live Internet Relay Chat section of the show.

A caller suggests the team search for the Jersey Devil, a mythic figure associated with the Pine Barrens. Avkast and Wheeler recruit Rein Clackin, a sound-man who allegedly can record the paranormal, and Jim Suerd, a psychic. Leigh later says that Suerd is emotionally disturbed. The plan is for the four men to go to the Pine Barrens, where Suerd will lead them to the site of the Jersey Devil. During the hunt, they will broadcast a live show simultaneously via television, Internet, and amateur radio.

They enter the Barrens, but only Suerd emerges alive. The others are brutally murdered, and Avkast's body is never found. Suerd was the only suspect, and was charged with murder of the others. During his murder trial, testimony shows that Avkast could not have survived, given the loss of blood found at the crime scene.

Leigh summarizes the trial. The prosecution has bolstered their case by the work of a video engineer (nicknamed "The Killer Cutter"), who compiles a documentary of the group's trip, using the surviving film footage found at the crime scene. Suerd is found guilty and imprisoned. Some observers doubt his guilt, because his clothes were not bloody. In addition, there is evidence he was engaged in an IRC room at the times of the murders.

Before his conviction can be appealed, Suerd dies in prison of unknown causes. Authorities consider the case closed. Leigh receives a box containing a damaged videotape reel, which he at first assumes is tape from the Fact or Fiction team, although none was believed to exist. He hires data retrieval expert Shelly Monarch to reconstruct the images on the tape. She finds that Wheeler and Clacklin's murders were caught on tape, and Suerd could not have killed them. She finds a blurred image of the real killer. As Leigh videotapes her, Monarch uses an image editor to re-construct the image of the killer's face. She completes this image before Leigh's next visit, and is shocked to discover that the killer is Leigh himself.

The camera "shifts" to a third-person perspective, whereas all previous footage had been "shot" by Leigh. From this perspective, viewers see Leigh attack Monarch and suffocate her with a piece of plastic sheeting. He loads her body into his car, drives it out to the woods, and dumps it in a clearing. He begins to tape himself narrating the next segment of his documentary.

== Cast ==
- David Beard as David Leigh, the filmmaker
- James Seward as James "Jim" L. Suerd, the accused
- Stefan Avalos as Steven "Johnny" Avkast, Fact or Fiction host
- Lance Weiler as Locus Wheeler, Fact or Fiction host
- Rein Clabbers as Rein Clackin, paranormal sound man
- Michele Pulaski as Michelle "Shelly" Monarch, data retrieval expert
- Tom Brunt as Thomas "Tom" Branski, Fact or Fiction video engineer
- Mark Rublee as Clair Deforest, video editor for the prosecution
- A.D. Roso as Detective Anthony Rosi, lead investigator
- Dale Worstall as Dr. Dale Orstall, Jim's child psychologist
- Vann K. Weller as Vann K. Waller, forensic pathologist
- Sam Wells as Sam Woods, film and television director
- Jay MacDonald as Jay McDowell, web designer
- Faith Weiler as Joyce Dryer, Jim's landlady
- Marianne Connor as Mary Brenner, TV reporter

== Production ==
The film was made on a budget of $900, and edited on a desktop computer using Adobe Premiere 4.2. $600 was allocated for production, while $240 were utilized for digital video stock, and twenty hours of tape for $12 each.

== Release ==
The Last Broadcast premiered regionally at the County Theater in Doylestown, Pennsylvania on March 9, 1998. It was released theatrically through Avalos and Weiler's independent distribution company, Wavelength Releasing, in seven U.S. cities on October 23, 1998, including Providence, Rhode Island; Orlando, Florida; Minneapolis, Minnesota; and Portland, Oregon. Because the film was not shot on film stock, the screenings were arranged to the select theaters via satellite streaming.

According to Box Office Mojo, the film grossed $12,097 at the U.S. theatrical box office. Film scholar Peter Turner reports a gross of $4 million for the film, without specifying which revenue sources are included in that figure.

=== Critical response ===
The film received mixed reviews from critics and audiences, earning an approval rating on Rotten Tomatoes of 47% based on 19 critic reviews.

Steven Rea and Desmond Ryan of The Philadelphia Inquirer deemed the film "startlingly good" and a "smart, assured work." Dave Jewett of The Columbian praised the film for its "innovative, low-cost techniques" and its "chilling climax", though he did criticize it for suffering some pacing issues.

The Last Broadcast drew comparisons with The Blair Witch Project (1999) because of similarities in their mock-documentary formats and online promotional campaigns. Writing in The Guardian in 1999, Sarah Kendzior examined the films' overlapping development histories, noting that production of The Last Broadcast began in December 1996, while the makers of The Blair Witch Project maintained that their concept had been registered in 1996. The Last Broadcast co-director Stefan Avalos regarded the similarities as coincidental. Film critic James Berardinelli likewise noted the similarities but rejected allegations that The Blair Witch Project had copied the earlier film.

In a negative review for The Guardian, Peter Bradshaw criticized the film's convoluted narrative and its ending, which he argued undermined the documentary format established earlier in the film. Comparing it unfavorably with The Blair Witch Project, he found that it lacked narrative clarity and failed to deliver on its potential for suspense.

=== Home media ===
The Last Broadcast was released through Ventura Distribution on VHS and DVD. Wavelength Releasing also was a part of the DVD releasing. Heretic Films re-released the DVD in 2006. A special Blu-ray edition was issued by the United Kingdom-based distributor 101 Films on July 12, 2022.

== Sources ==
- Coleman, Loren; Hallenbeck, Bruce G. (2010). Monsters of New Jersey: Mysterious Creatures in the Garden State. Mechanicsburg, Pennsylvania: Stackpole Books. ISBN 978-0-8117-3596-4.
