= The Black List (survey) =

Annual film survey

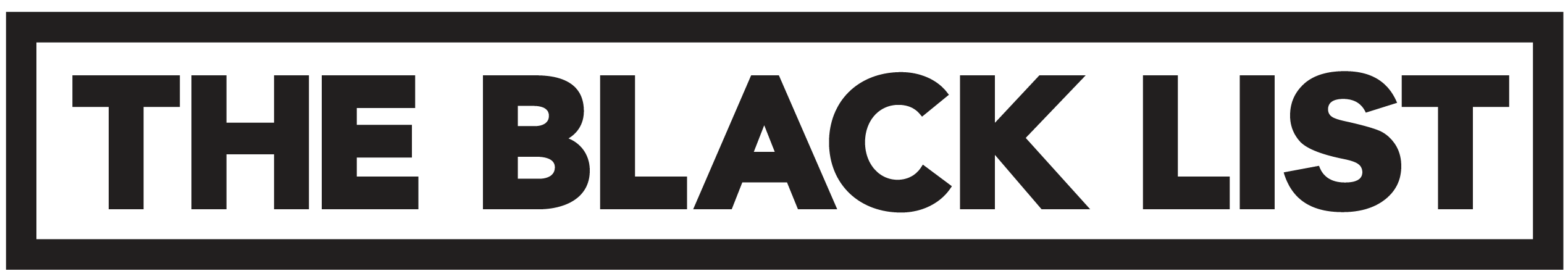
- Created: 2004; 22 years ago
- Location: blcklst.com/lists/
- Author: Franklin Leonard
- Purpose: Ranking of top unproduced screenplays

The Black List is an annual survey of the "most-liked" motion picture screenplays not yet produced in the mainstream American film industry. It has been published every year since 2005 on the second Friday of December by Franklin Leonard, a development executive who has worked at Universal Pictures and Will Smith's Overbrook Entertainment. The website states that these are not necessarily "the best" screenplays, but rather "the most liked", since it is based on a survey of studio and production company executives.

Of the more than 1,000 screenplays The Black List has included since 2005, at least 450 have been produced as theatrical films, including Argo, American Hustle, Juno, The King's Speech, Slumdog Millionaire, Spotlight, The Revenant, The Descendants, Promising Young Woman, and Hell or High Water. The produced films have together grossed over $30 billion, and been nominated for 241 Academy Awards and 205 Golden Globe Awards, winning 50 and 40 respectively. As of the 92nd Academy Awards, four of the last 10 Academy Awards for Best Picture went to scripts featured on a previous Black List, as well as 12 of the last 20 screenwriting Oscars (Original and Adapted Screenplays). Additionally, writers whose scripts are listed often find that they are more readily hired for other jobs, even if their listed screenplays still have not been produced, such as Jim Rash and Nat Faxon, two of the writers of the screenplay for The Descendants, who had an earlier screenplay make the list. Slate columnist David Haglund has written that the list's reputation as a champion for "beloved but challenging" works has been overstated, since "these are screenplays that are already making the Hollywood rounds. And while, as a rule, they have not yet been produced, many of them are already in production."

== History ==
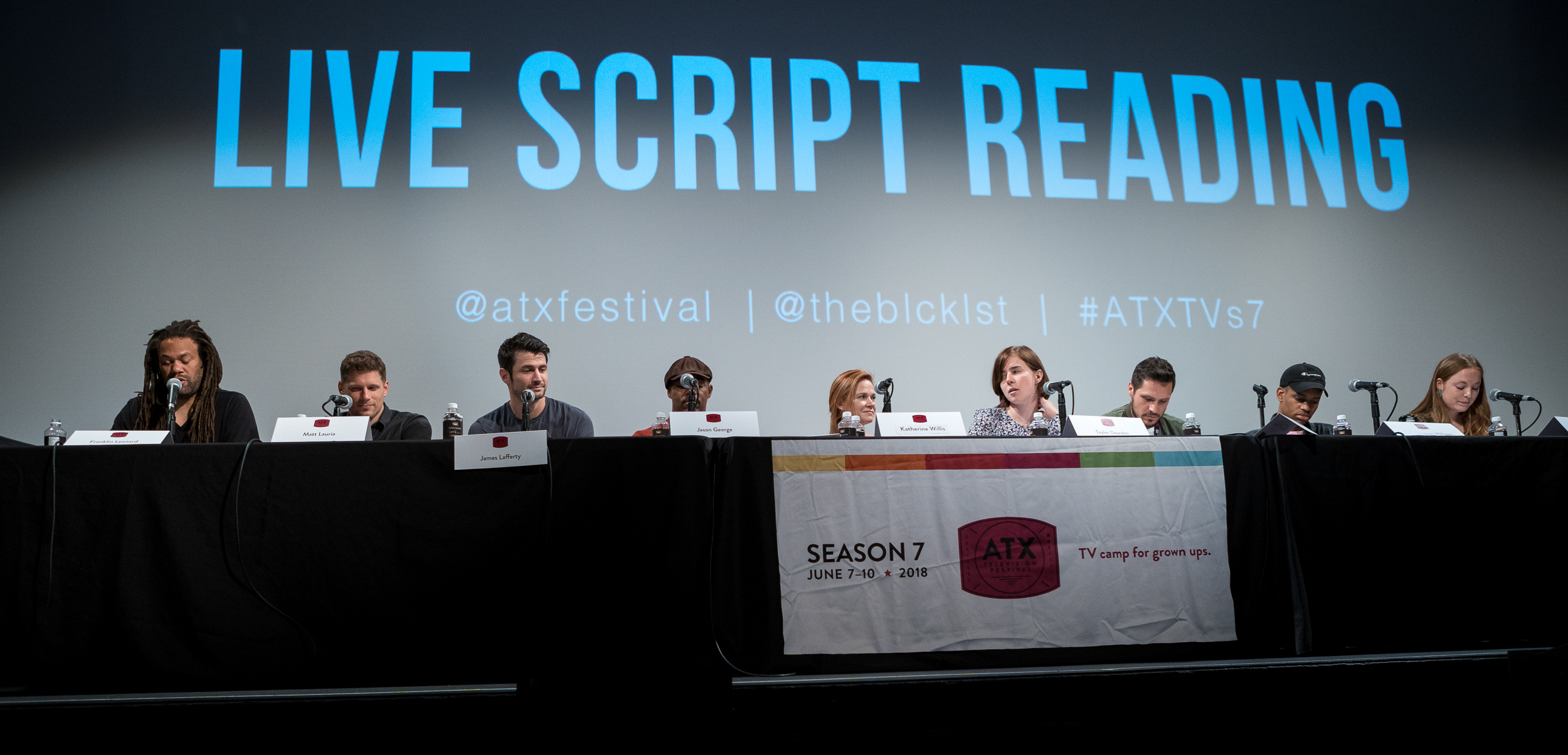
A Black List live script reading panel at the 2018 ATX Television Festival (pictured from L–R): Moderator Franklin Leonard, with Matt Lauria, James Lafferty, Jason George, Katherine Willis, Taylor Dearden, Nick Wechsler, Tyrel Jackson Williams, and Riley Scott.

The first Black List was compiled in 2005 by Franklin Leonard, at the time working as a development executive for Leonardo DiCaprio's production company, Appian Way Productions. He emailed about 75 fellow development executives and asked them to name the ten best unproduced screenplays they read that year. To thank them for participating, he compiled the list and sent it to the respondents. The name The Black List was a nod to his heritage as an African American man, and also as a reference to the writers who were barred during the McCarthy era as part of the Hollywood blacklist.

The screenplays to top The Black List, from 2005 to 2025 respectively, are: Things We Lost in the Fire; The Brigands of Rattleborge; Recount; The Beaver; The Muppet Man; College Republicans; The Imitation Game; Draft Day; Holland, Michigan; Catherine the Great; Bubbles; Blond Ambition; Ruin; Frat Boy Genius; Move On; Headhunter; Cauliflower; Pure; Bad Boy; One Night Only; and Best Seller.

On January 27, 2019, at the 2019 Sundance Film Festival, it was announced that the LGBT media advocacy group GLAAD had partnered with The Black List to create The GLAAD List, a new curated list of the most promising unmade LGBT-inclusive scripts in Hollywood.

=== Structure ===
The Black List tallies the number of "likes" various screenplays are given by development executives, and then ranks them accordingly. The most-liked screenplay is The Imitation Game, which topped the list in 2011 with 133 likes; it went on to win the Academy Award for Best Adapted Screenplay at the 87th Academy Awards in 2015.

== Films on the Black List ==
More than 450 screenplays have been put into production after appearing on The Black List. These include:

=== 2005 Black List ===
(129/286 screenplays produced; 127 completed; 2 in production)

- 21 (2008)
- Afternoon Delight (2013) – then titled Tricycle
- All God's Children Can Dance (2008) – then titled K-Town Super Frog
- The American (2010) – then titled A Very Private Gentleman, by Laura Harrington
- Altered Carbon (2018–2020) – adapted to television
- Anonymous (2011) – then titled Soul of the Age
- Armored (2009) – by Andrew Kevin Walker
- Babel (2006)
- Balls Out: Gary the Tennis Coach (2009) – then titled Gary the Tennis Coach
- Black Snake Moan (2006)
- Blades of Glory (2007)
- Blind (2016)
- Blood Diamond (2006) – by Edward Zwick and Marshall Herskovitz
- Breach (2007)
- The Brothers Solomon (2007)
- The Bucket List (2007)
- The Burial (2023)
- Buried in Barstow (2022) – then titled Barstow
- Carnival Row (2019–2023) – then titled A Killing on Carnival Row; adapted to television
- Chapter 27 (2007)
- Charlie Wilson's War (2007)
- Charlie Bartlett (2007)
- Cougars, Inc. (2011) – then titled Mother's Little Helpers
- Dan in Real Life (2007)
- Dangerous Parking (2007)
- Dark Around The Stars (2013) – then titled Stars
- Death at a Funeral (2010)
- Delirium (2018) – then titled Home
- Dexter (2006–2013) – adapted to television
- Disturbia (2007)
- The Dirt (2019)
- Dream House (2011)
- Eight Below (2006) – then titled Antarctica
- Ender's Game (2013) – by D.B. Weiss
- The Expendables (2010) – then titled Barrow
- Factory Girl (2006)
- Fanboys (2009)
- The Fast and the Furious: Tokyo Drift (2006)
- The Forger (2014)
- Freedomland (2006)
- Fur (2006)
- The Game Plan (2007) – then titled Daddy's Little Girl
- Get Low (2009)
- The Good Lie (2014) – then titled Lost Boys of Sudan
- A Good Old Fashioned Orgy (2011)
- Hal Buckley (2001) (Note: Short film from same writers in 2001 adapted to feature for 2005 list.)
- Hall Pass (2011)
- Hancock (2008) – then titled Tonight, He Comes
- Harold (2008)
- The Hawk Is Dying (2006)
- Henry Poole Is Here (2008) – then titled Stain
- The Highwaymen (2019)
- The Hoax (2006)
- Honeymoon with Harry (TBA) – by Paul Haggis
- Horrible Bosses (2011)
- Hot Rod (2007)
- The Hunting Party (2007) – then titled Spring Break in Bosnia
- Infamous (2006) – then titled Every Word is True
- In Secret (2013) – then titled Terese Raquin
- Juno (2007)
- Killer Elite (2011) – by John Jarrell
- King of California (2007)
- The Kingdom (2007)
- The Kite Runner (2007)
- Lars and the Real Girl (2007)
- The Ledge (2011)
- Legendary (2010) – then titled Oxley's Road
- Life After Beth (2014) – then titled Winged Life
- The Life Before Her Eyes (2007) – then titled In Bloom
- Little Children (2006)
- Little Miss Sunshine (2006)
- Love in the Time of Cholera (2007)
- Lucky Number Slevin (2006)
- The Maiden Heist (2009) – then titled Lonely Maiden
- Mama's Boy (2007)
- Margaret (2011)
- Married Life (2007) – then titled Marriage
- Meet Bill (2007) – then titled Bill
- Meet Dave (2008) – then titled Starship Dave
- Message from the King (2016)
- Michael Clayton (2007)
- A Million Little Pieces (2019) – by James Frey
- The Mummy: Tomb of the Dragon Emperor (2008)
- My All American (2015) – by Jeff Roda
- The Mysteries of Pittsburgh (2008)
- Nacho Libre (2006)
- Nebraska (2013)
- Nick & Norah's Infinite Playlist (2008)
- Not Another Happy Ending (2013) – then titled Happy Endings
- Notes on a Scandal (2006)
- The Number 23 (2007)
- One Percent More Humid (2017)
- The Only Living Boy in New York (2017)
- The Other Boleyn Girl (2008)
- Pathfinder (2007)
- Passengers (2008)
- Peacock (2010)
- Post Grad (2009) – then titled Ticket to Ride
- The Prestige (2006)
- The Proposal (2009), by Jennifer Kirby
- The Promotion (2008) — then titled Quebec
- The Pursuit of Happyness (2006)
- Pu-239 (2006)
- Quid Pro Quo (2008)
- The Queen (2006)
- Reservation Road (2007)
- Righteous Kill (2008)
- The Sasquatch Gang (2006) – then titled The Sasquatch Dumpling Gang
- Stardust (2007)
- The Starling (2021)
- Stop-Loss (2008)
- Studio 60 on the Sunset Strip (2006–2007) – then titled Studio 7
- Survivor (TBA)
- The Ten (2007)
- Tenure (2009)
- Things We Lost in the Fire (2007)
- The Time Traveler's Wife (2009) – by Jeremy Leven
- Turistas (2006)
- Under the Skin (2013) – by Alexander Stuart
- Wanted (2008)
- We Are Marshall (2006)
- The Whistleblower (2010)
- Wild Hogs (2007)
- The Words (2012)
- World Trade Center (2006)
- X-Men Origins: Wolverine (2009)
- The Year of Getting to Know Us (2008) – then titled Eliot Rockett
- Youth in Revolt (2009)
- Zodiac (2007)

=== 2006 Black List ===
(42/87 screenplays produced)

- 3:10 to Yuma (2007) – by Stuart Beattie
- 500 Days of Summer (2009)
- A Mighty Heart (2007) – by Michael Winterbottom & Laurence Coriat
- All About Steve (2009)
- Assassination of a High School President (2008)
- Away We Go (2009) – then titled This Must Be the Place
- The Brothers Bloom (2008)
- The Bucket List (2007)
- Changeling (2008)
- Crash Pad (2017) – then titled Bim Bam Baby
- Curve (2015)
- Dear Dictator (2018) – then titled Coup d'Etat
- Death at a Funeral (2007)
- The Devil's Double (2011)
- The Disappearance of Eleanor Rigby (2013)
- The Diving Bell and the Butterfly (2007)
- Dracula Untold (2014) – then titled Dracula Year Zero
- The Fighter (2010) – by Lewis Colick
- Frost/Nixon (2008)
- Get Smart (2008)
- Get On Up (2014) – then titled Superbad
- Hanna (2011)
- Harold & Kumar Escape from Guantanamo Bay (2008)
- In Bruges (2008)
- Life of Pi (2012) – by Jean-Pierre Jeunet & Guillaume Laurent
- Lions for Lambs (2007)
- The Men Who Stare at Goats (2009)
- The Messenger (2009)
- My All American (2015) – Jeff Roda (Note: Repeated entry from 2005 list.)
- Natural Selection (2011)
- The Other Woman (2009) – then titled Love and Other Impossible Pursuits
- Open Grave (2013)
- Rendition (2007)
- Scott Pilgrim vs. the World (2010) – then titled Scott Pilgrim's Precious Little Life
- Seven Pounds (2008)
- Seven Psychopaths (2012)
- She's Out of My League (2010)
- State of Play (2009)
- Superbad (2007)
- There Will Be Blood (2007)
- Walk Hard: The Dewey Cox Story (2007)
- Year of the Dog (2007)

=== 2007 Black List ===
(57/128 screenplays produced; 56 completed, 1 in production)

- The Answer Man (2009) – then titled The Dream of the Romans
- Adventureland (2009)
- All Good Things (2010)
- Bartali (TBA) – then titled Lion Man of Tuscany, by Nathan Skulnik
- Big Eyes (2014)
- Blindness (2008)
- Blitz (2008)
- Bohemian Rhapsody (2018) – then titled Somebody to Love
- The Book of Eli (2010)
- The Book of Love (2016) – then titled The Devil and the Deep Blue Sea
- Burn After Reading (2008)
- Burnt (2015) – then titled Untitled Chef Project
- Charlie Countryman (2013) – then titled The Necessary Death of Charlie Countryman
- Clash of the Titans (2010)
- Dear John (2010)
- Demolition (2015)
- Dirty Girl (2010)
- Doubt (2008)
- The Duchess (2008)
- Duplicity (2009)
- Eagle Eye (2008)
- Genius (2016)
- The Hangover (2009)
- Happy. Thank You. More. Please. (2010)
- Hitchcock (2012) – then titled Alfred Hitchcock and the Making of Psycho
- How to Lose Friends & Alienate People (2008)
- The Ides of March (2011) – then titled Farragut North
- The Invention of Lying (2009) – then titled This Side of the Truth
- Invictus (2009) – then titled The Human Factor
- Jack Ryan: Shadow Recruit (2014) – then titled Dubai
- Jennifer's Body (2009)
- Justice League (2017)
- Last Chance Harvey (2008), by Stephen Hopkins
- Let It Fall: Los Angeles 1982–1992 (2017) (Note: Initially greenlit as a narrative feature, it was shifted during development into a documentary.)
- Love & Other Drugs (2010) – then titled Untitled Charles Randolph Pharmaceutical Film
- Management (2009)
- Mark Felt: The Man Who Brought Down the White House (2017) – then titled Deep Throat
- Never Let Me Go (2010)
- Orphan (2009)
- Passengers (2016)
- Recount (2008)
- The Revenant (2015)
- The Road (2009)
- Salt (2010) – then titled Edwin A. Salt
- Selma (2014)
- Slumdog Millionaire (2008)
- Source Code (2011)
- The Town (2010)
- Valkyrie (2008)
- The Wackness (2008)
- The Way, Way Back (2013) – then titled The Way Back
- Whip It (2009)
- The Wolf of Wall Street (2013)
- World War Z (2013)
- The Wrestler (2008)
- Yes Man (2008)
- Zombieland (2009)

=== 2008 Black List ===
(39/106 screenplays produced; 38 completed, 1 in production)

- 47 Ronin (2013)
- 50/50 (2011) – then titled I'm With Cancer
- A.C.O.D. (2013) – then titled ACOD: Adult Children of Divorce
- All I Wish (2017) – then titled A Little Something for Your Birthday
- Bachelorette (2012)
- The Back-up Plan (2010) – then titled Plan B
- Bad Teacher (2011)
- The Beaver (2011)
- Broken City (2013)
- Butter (2011)
- Child 44 (2015)
- Cop Out (2010) – then titled A Couple of Dicks
- Date and Switch (2014) – then titled Gay Dude
- The Debt (2010)
- The Descendants (2011)
- Easy A (2010)
- Everything Must Go (2010)
- The F Word (2013) – then titled The F-Word
- Foxcatcher (2014)
- The Fourth Kind (2009)
- Going the Distance (2010)
- Hope Springs (2012) – then titled Untitled Vanessa Taylor Project
- Inglourious Basterds (2009)
- Killing Season (2013) – then titled Shrapnel
- London Boulevard (2010)
- Lovelace (2013) – then titled Inferno: A Linda Lovelace Story, by Matt Wilder
- No Strings Attached (2011) – then titled Fuckbuddies
- Nowhere Boy (2009)
- The Oranges (2011)
- Our Brand Is Crisis (2015)
- Out of the Furnace (2013) – then titled The Low Dweller
- Remember Me (2010) – then titled Memoirs
- Sherlock Holmes (2009)
- Sleeping Beauty (2011)
- Sunflower (TBA)
- Unlocked (2017)
- Up in the Air (2009)
- What's Your Number? (2011) – then titled Twenty Times a Lady
- Worth (2020) – then titled What Is Life Worth?

=== 2009 Black List ===
(44/97 screenplays produced)

- 2 Guns (2013)
- 30 Minutes or Less (2011)
- Arthur (2011)
- The Baytown Outlaws (2012) – then titled Baytown Disco
- Booksmart (2019)
- Buried (2010)
- Cedar Rapids (2011)
- Celeste and Jesse Forever (2012)
- Cut Bank (2014)
- Dark Was the Night (2014) – then titled The Trees
- Desperados (2020)
- Due Date (2010)
- The Duel (2016) – then titled By Way of Helena
- Feud (2017–2024) – then titled Best Actress; adapted to television as an anthology series
- The Guilt Trip (2012) – then titled My Mother’s Curse
- Hanna (2011)
- If I Stay (2014)
- The Isolate Thief (2026)
- The King's Speech (2010)
- The Kings of Summer (2013) – then titled Toy's House
- The Last Stand (2013)
- Lawless (2012) – then titled The Wettest County
- Mixtape (2021)
- Motor City (2025)
- Pawn Sacrifice (2014)
- Prisoners (2013)
- Red Riding Hood (2011) – then titled The Girl With the Red Riding Hood
- Restless (2011)
- Seeking Justice (2011) – then titled The Hungry Rabbit Jumps
- Shimmer Lake (2017)
- The Sitter (2011)
- The Social Network (2010)
- The Spectacular Now (2013)
- Take This Waltz (2011)
- That's My Boy (2012) – then titled I Hate You Dad
- The To Do List (2013) – then titled The Hand Job
- The True Memoirs of an International Assassin (2016)
- The Umbrella Academy – adapted to television (2019–2024) (Note: Bomback was eventually replaced by another writer for the film adaptation, which never came to fruition. A separate television adaptation, The Umbrella Academy (2019–2024), was later developed for Netflix, with the pilot episode written by Jeremy Slater.)
- The Vatican Tapes (2015)
- The Voices (2014)
- Wall Street: Money Never Sleeps (2010) – then titled Wall Street 2: Money Never Sleeps
- The Watch (2012) – then titled Neighborhood Watch
- Water for Elephants (2011)
- Z for Zachariah (2015)

=== 2010 Black List ===
(48/76 screenplays produced; 47 completed, 1 in production)

- Abduction (2011)
- Abraham Lincoln: Vampire Hunter (2012)
- American Hustle (2013) – then titled American Bullshit
- Argo (2012)
- ATM (2012)
- Better Living Through Chemistry (2014)
- The Butler (2013)
- Can You Keep a Secret? (2019) – by Megan Martin
- Chronicle (2012)
- Cinema Verite (2011)
- Crazy, Stupid, Love (2011)
- Danny Collins (2015) – then titled Imagine
- Die in a Gunfight (2021)
- Edge of Tomorrow (2014) – then titled All You Need Is Kill, by Dante Harper
- The Escort (TBA)
- Everly (2014)
- Freaks of Nature (2015) – then titled Kitchen Sink
- Fun Size (2012)
- Gangster Squad (2013)
- Get a Job (2016)
- Gold (2016)
- The Gray Man (2022) – then titled Gray Man, by Adam Cozad
- How It Ends (2018)
- The Hunger Games (2012) – then titled Hunger Games
- The Impossible (2012)
- Jackie (2016)
- The Last Son (2021) – then titled The Last Son of Isaac LeMay
- The Last Witch Hunter (2015)
- Lola Versus (2012)
- Looper (2012)
- Margin Call (2011)
- Murder of a Cat (2014)
- One Day (2011)
- Oz the Great and Powerful (2013) – then titled Oz: The Great and Powerful
- Paint (2023)
- People Like Us (2012) – then titled Welcome to People
- Prom (2011)
- Ricky Stanicky (2024)
- Safe House (2012)
- Scouts Guide to the Zombie Apocalypse (2015) – then titled Boy Scouts vs. Zombies
- Search Party (2014) – then titled Road to Nardo
- Serena (2014)
- Snow White and the Huntsman (2012)
- Stoker (2013)
- Succession (2018–2023) – then titled Murdoch; adapted to television
- That Awkward Moment (2014) – then titled Are We Officially Dating?
- Triple 9 (2016) – then titled 999
- What Happened to Monday (2017) – then titled What Happened to Monday?

=== 2011 Black List ===
(29/73 screenplays produced; 28 completed, 1 in production)

- The Accountant (2016)
- Arizona (2018)
- Bad Words (2013)
- Before I Fall (2017)
- The Broken Hearts Gallery (2020) – then titled The Museum of Broken Relationships
- The Current War (2017)
- Dirty Grandpa (2016)
- Django Unchained (2012)
- The DUFF (2015)
- Ezekiel Moss (TBA)
- Father Figures (2017) – then titled Bastards
- Future Man (2017–2020) – then titled The Slackfi Project, adapted to television
- Good Kids (2016)
- Grace of Monaco (2014)
- Hidden (2015)
- The Hitman's Bodyguard (2017)
- The Imitation Game (2014)
- Jane Got a Gun (2015)
- Long Shot (2019) – then titled Flarsky
- Maggie (2015)
- The Outsider (2018)
- Playing It Cool (2015) – then titled A Many Splintered Thing
- The Pretty One (2013)
- Saving Mr. Banks (2013)
- Self/less (2015)
- Sex Tape (2014)
- St. Vincent (2014) – then titled St. Vincent de Van Nuys
- Two Night Stand (2014)
- When the Streetlights Go On (2020) – adapted to television

=== 2012 Black List ===
(27/78 screenplays produced)

- The Adam Project (2022) – then titled Our Name Is Adam
- Arrival (2016) – then titled Story of Your Life
- Blockers (2018) – then titled Cherries
- Come and Find Me (2016)
- Don't Make Me Go (2022)
- Draft Day (2014)
- The Equalizer (2014)
- Extremely Wicked, Shockingly Evil and Vile (2019)
- Fathers and Daughters (2015)
- The Fault in Our Stars (2014)
- Flower (2017)
- Hell or High Water (2016) – then titled Comancheria
- Jojo Rabbit (2019)
- The Judge (2014)
- The Keeping Room (2014)
- Me and Earl and the Dying Girl (2015)
- Murder City (2023)
- The Outcasts (2017) – then titled The Outskirts
- Project Almanac (2015) – then titled Almanac
- Run All Night (2015) – then titled All-Nighter
- Sand Castle (2017)
- Shut In (2016)
- Stockholm, Pennsylvania (2015)
- The Survivalist (2015)
- Sweet Virginia (2017)
- Transcendence (2014)
- Whiplash (2014)

=== 2013 Black List ===
(19/72 screenplays produced)

- A Beautiful Day in the Neighborhood (2019) – then titled I'm Proud of You (Note: Another screenplay on that year's list, written by Alexis C. Jolly, also went by the title A Beautiful Day in the Neighborhood; however, while both screenplays involve Fred Rogers, Jolly's screenplay covers Rogers' early career and is otherwise unrelated to the script by Noah Harpster and Micah Fitzerman-Blue.)
- American Sniper (2014)
- The Autopsy of Jane Doe (2016)
- Cake (2014)
- Dude (2018)
- The End of the Tour (2015)
- Extinction (2018)
- Faults (2014)
- The Gateway (2021) – then titled Where Angels Die
- Holland (2025) – then titled Holland, Michigan
- Hot Summer Nights (2017)
- The Independent (2022)
- A Monster Calls (2016)
- Pan (2015)
- Patient Zero (2018) – then titled Patient Z
- Reminiscence (2021)
- The Sea of Trees (2015)
- Shovel Buddies (2016)
- Spotlight (2015)

=== 2014 Black List ===
(18/70 screenplays produced)

- American Made (2017) – then titled Mena
- The Babysitter (2017)
- Big Time Adolescence (2019)
- Bird Box (2018)
- Coffee and Kareem (2020)
- The Founder (2016)
- Gifted (2017)
- How to Make a Killing (2026) – then titled Rothchild
- Josie (2018) – then titled Huntsville
- LBJ (2016)
- Manchester by the Sea (2016)
- Money Monster (2016)
- Morgan (2016)
- My Friend Dahmer (2017)
- On the Basis of Sex (2018)
- The Shallows (2016) – then titled In the Deep
- The Wall (2017)
- Tau (2018)

=== 2015 Black List ===
(22/81 screenplays produced)

- All the Money in the World (2017)
- American Woman (2018) – then titled The Burning Woman
- Bed Rest (2022)
- City of Lies (2017) – then titled Labyrinth
- Chappaquiddick (2017)
- Crater (2023)
- Dreamland (2019)
- Eli (2019)
- Lou (2022)
- Lucy in the Sky (2019) – then titled Pale Blue Dot
- Miss Sloane (2016)
- Nyad (2023) – by Robert Specland
- Operation Finale (2018) – then titled Hunting Eichmann
- Rough Night (2017) – then titled Move That Body
- Senior Year (2022)
- Set It Up (2018)
- The Standoff at Sparrow Creek (2018) – then titled Militia
- Stronger (2017)
- Three Months (2022)
- The Water Man (2020)
- Wish Upon (2017)
- White Boy Rick (2018)

=== 2016 Black List ===
(20/73 screenplays produced)

- America: The Motion Picture (2021)
- Adrift (2018)
- Bad Education (2019)
- Free Guy (2021)
- Hala (2019)
- Hotel Artemis (2018)
- The Housewife (2026)
- I Think We're Alone Now (2018)
- I Am Mother (2019) – then titled Mother
- I, Tonya (2017)
- In the Blink of an Eye (2026)
- Late Night (2019) – then titled Untitled Late Night Comedy
- Life Itself (2018)
- Miller's Girl (2024)
- Oxygen (2021) – then titled O2
- Palmer (2021)
- The Post (2017)
- Roman J. Israel, Esq. (2017) – then titled Inner City
- Space Oddity (2022)
- Villains (2019)

=== 2017 Black List ===
(19/76 screenplays produced)

- All My Life (2020)
- Ballerina (2025)
- Breaking News in Yuba County (2021)
- Call Jane (2022)
- Daddio (2024)
- Finch (2021) – then titled Bios
- FUBAR (2023–2025) – then titled Fubar, by Brent Hyman – adapted for television
- Greenland (2020)
- Heart of the Beast (2026)
- Infinite (2021)
- Kate (2021)
- The Other Lamb (2019)
- Project Power (2020) – then titled Power
- The Lodge (2019)
- The Mother (2023)
- The Saviors (2026)
- The Sleepover (2020)
- The Survivor (2021) – then titled The Boxer
- Woman of the Hour (2024) – then titled Rodney & Sheryl

=== 2018 Black List ===
(11/73 screenplays produced)

- Asphalt City (2024) – then titled Black Flies
- By Any Means (2026) – then titled CI-34
- Cobweb (2023)
- The High Note (2020) – then titled Covers
- The Half of It (2020)
- King Richard (2021)
- Little Fish (2020)
- Meet Cute (2022)
- Promising Young Woman (2020)
- Queen & Slim (2019)
- Young. Wild. Free. (2023)

=== 2019 Black List ===
(12/66 screenplays produced)

- 8-Bit Christmas (2021)
- Breathe (2024)
- The Devil's Mouth (2026) – then titled Apex (Note: Another screenplay on that year's list, written by Stephen Vitale, also went by the title Apex; though features a story around Competitive Bodybuilding at Muscle Beach.)
- Don't Worry Darling (2022)
- Knock at the Cabin (2023) – then titled The Cabin at the End of the World
- The Menu (2022)
- Relay (2025) – then titled The Broker
- Resurrection (2022)
- Shut In (2022)
- They Cloned Tyrone (2023)
- The Unbearable Weight of Massive Talent (2022)
- Voicemails for Isabelle (2026)

=== 2020 Black List ===
(24/80 screenplays produced; 23 completed, 1 in production)

- A Big Bold Beautiful Journey (2025)
- Anything's Possible (2022) – then titled What If?
- Bella (TBA)
- Borderline (2025)
- Bubble & Squeak (2025)
- Chang Can Dunk (2023)
- Emancipation (2022)
- Emergency (2022)
- Fight or Flight (2025)
- Flight Risk (2025)
- Get Lite (2027)
- The Gorge (2025)
- Hold Your Breath (2024) – then titled Dust
- Horsegirls (2025) – then titled Horsegirl
- I.S.S. (2024)
- If You Were the Last (2023)
- Lurker (2025)
- Magazine Dreams (2025)
- May December (2023)
- Mouse (2026)
- Nanny (2022)
- Sharper (2023)
- Suncoast (2024)
- The Woman in the Yard (2025) – then titled The Man in the Yard

=== 2021 Black List ===
(7/73 screenplays produced)

- A Nice Indian Boy (2025)
- Air (2023) – then titled Air Jordan
- Apex (2026)
- Barron's Cove (2025)
- Challengers (2024)
- The Family Plan (2023)
- Lift (2024)

=== 2022 Black List ===
(6/74 screenplays produced; 4 completed, 2 in production)

- 42.6 Years (TBA)
- Eternity (2025)
- Him (2025) – then titled Goat
- Jingle Bell Heist (2025)
- Madden (2026)
- Subversion (TBA)

=== 2023 Black List ===
(5/76 screenplays produced; 3 completed, 2 in production)

- Forbidden Fruits (2026)
- The Masque of the Red Death (TBA)
- The Peasant (TBA)
- Perfect Girl (TBA) – then titled Unnie
- Runner (2026)
- Sender (2026) – then titled Return to Sender

=== 2024 Black List ===
(4/83 screenplays produced; 3 completed, 1 in production)

- Love of Your Life (2026)
- One Night Only (2026)
- Tony (2026)
- Turpentine (TBA)

=== 2025 Black List ===
(0/74 screenplays produced; 1 in production)

- The Waffle House Index (TBA)

== See also ==
- Blood List
