= Cobweb (2023 American film) =

Film by Samuel Bodin

- Theatrical release poster
- Directed by: Samuel Bodin
- Written by: Chris Thomas Devlin
- Produced by: Roy Lee; Andrew Childs; Evan Goldberg; Seth Rogen; James Weaver; Josh Fagen
- Starring: Lizzy Caplan; Woody Norman; Cleopatra Coleman; Antony Starr
- Cinematography: Philip Lozano
- Edited by: Richard Riffaud; Kevin Greutert
- Music by: Drum & Lace
- Production companies: Lionsgate Films; Point Grey Pictures; Vertigo Entertainment
- Distributed by: Lionsgate Films
- Release date: July 21, 2023
- Running time: 88 minutes
- Country: United States
- Language: English
- Box office: $10.1 million

Cobweb is a 2023 American horror film directed by Samuel Bodin in his directorial debut. Its screenplay, written by Chris Thomas Devlin, was included in the 2018 Black List, and follows a young boy, raised by overprotective parents, who suddenly hears noises coming from behind his bedroom wall. The film stars Lizzy Caplan, Woody Norman, Cleopatra Coleman, and Antony Starr.

Cobweb had a limited theatrical release in the United States by Lionsgate Films on July 21, 2023. It received mixed reviews from critics.

== Plot ==
Peter is a shy, bullied, eight-year-old boy living with his overbearing and emotionally distant parents, Carol and Mark. He earns sympathy, though, from his substitute teacher, Miss Devine. Peter wishes to go trick-or-treating on Halloween night, but his parents forbid him due to the disappearance of a young girl in the neighborhood several years ago.

Later that night, Peter is woken up by the sound of tapping from the inside of a wall in his bedroom. His parents deny these occurrences, insisting that he is imagining them. Over the next few days, Peter talks with a voice coming from the wall. The voice claims that she was trapped in the walls by Peter's parents and calls them "evil". Miss Devine becomes concerned after seeing a picture Peter drew of himself scared in bed with the words "Help me", and Carol admonishes Peter for bringing his delusions to his teacher. At school, Brian, a bully, destroys Peter's prize pumpkin. Spurred by the voice's advice, Peter pushes Brian down the stairs, breaking his leg. After learning he has been expelled, Peter's parents lock him in the basement, where he discovers a pit covered with a grate.

Miss Devine checks up on Peter, but is intimidated and chased away by Mark, who has a gash on his arm. Later, after Peter is released from the basement, the voice explains that she is Peter's older sister Sarah, whom their parents locked away after deciding they did not want her anymore. Carol and Mark had chosen Halloween as the day to imprison her, and the girl who went missing years ago had been a trick-or-treater they murdered after she attempted to help Sarah. She tells Peter to go to see what their parents buried in the garden, and he uncovers the skull of the young girl there.

She convinces Peter that their parents are planning to kill her and will imprison him in the walls next. His only chance to avoid sharing her fate is to kill them, which he does by slipping rat poison into their soup and cutting the phone line so they cannot call an ambulance. Both parents try to stop him, but are unsuccessful, with Mark succumbing to the poison and Carol accidentally stabbing herself with a kitchen knife after Peter kicks her down the stairs. Right before Carol dies, she warns him, "Don't let her out."

Peter unlocks a hidden door behind the grandfather clock in their parents' bedroom. Sarah finally crawls out, revealing herself to be a grotesque, disfigured being. Her voice is rough now, very different from her earlier small-girl-voice. Her movements are sudden, fear-indulging, her tone is cynical. Peter tries to flee from her and hides under the bed. Suddenly, the door-bell rings, and Brian and his cousins show up, planning to take revenge on Peter, but after invading the house, they are all killed by Sarah.

Peter is still hiding under the bed. Sarah crawls on the bed, and explains that she was born severely deformed, causing her to look like a monster. Terrified by her appearance, their parents locked her away and she was forced to live a wretched, feral existence in the dark, learning to crawl on the walls and hunt at extreme speeds. She reveals that she has been manipulating Peter into taking revenge on their parents for locking her away and has resented him for being able to live the normal life she had been denied. After this explanation, Sarah captures her brother, and locks him behind the door in the wall.

Miss Devine arrives and attempts to help Peter escape, Sarah scratches her, but she stays active and successfully finds Peter closed behind the wall, she breaks a hole in the wall, lets Peter out, and they both try to escape the house. Only Miss Devine can run out to the street, as Sarah is able to pull Peter back from the doorstep and recapture him. She locks him in the closed pit in the basement this time. The two siblings have again a dreadful conversation together in the narrow pit. As Miss Devine tries to intervene again, Sarah interrupts the conversation with Peter, she climbs out of the pit, and tries to kill Miss Devine, but Peter exploits her distraction, climbs out of the pit by grabbing Sarah's long hair that reaches from the top of the pit to its bottom, he is able to join Miss Devine and they subdue Sarah together, and they imprison her in the pit.

Sarah tries to manipulate Peter again in her fake small-girl-voice, mentioning that they are siblings, but in vain. After that, she talks again in her rough, cynical voice. She says Peter has many of her features.

As Miss Devine and Peter move away from the pit, Sarah vows that she will escape all over again and always follow him.

== Cast ==
- Lizzy Caplan as Carol
- Antony Starr as Mark
- Cleopatra Coleman as Miss Devine
- Woody Norman as Peter
- Luke Busey as Brian
- Aleksandra Dragova as The Girl (Sarah)
- Olivia Sussman as the voice of Young Sarah
- Debra Wilson as the voice of Monster Sarah

== Production ==
In May 2020, Samuel Bodin was reported to be directing Cobweb for Lionsgate Films, and that Seth Rogen, Evan Goldberg, James Weaver, Roy Lee, and Jon Berg would produce it. Media Capital Technologies was responsible for co-financing the film.

In September 2020, Lizzy Caplan, Antony Starr, Cleopatra Coleman, and Woody Norman were announced to be starring in the film, with principal photography set to commence in Bulgaria. Filming occurred in Nu Boyana Film Studios in November 2020.

== Release ==
Cobweb had a limited theatrical release by Lionsgate in the United States on July 21, 2023. The film was released on digital formats on August 11. It was later released on Blu-ray and DVD on September 12.

== Reception ==
On the review aggregator website Rotten Tomatoes, 58% of 92 critics' reviews are positive, with an average rating of 5.8/10. The website's consensus reads: "This itsy bitsy horror film creeps and crawls." Metacritic, which uses a weighted average, assigned the film a score of 50 out of 100, based on 14 critics, indicating "mixed or average" reviews.

Valerie Complex of Deadline Hollywood wrote, "the movie's strengths lie in the established atmosphere of intrigue and suspense. However, it can't sustain that as it grapples with missed opportunities and a lackluster conclusion that fails to bring closure to its narrative." Variety's Dennis Harvey criticized the script and characters, but added, "Still, director Samuel Bodin's first theatrical feature is atmospheric, and departs from stock slasher conventions just enough to make for an entertaining if unexceptional scarefest." Bob Strauss of the San Francisco Chronicle gave the film three out of four stars, writing, "Although derivative, Chris Thomas Devlin's script has enough sick, witty ideas to make the fearsome goings-on seem fresh and immediate."

The Hollywood Reporter's David Rooney wrote, "The influence of Linda Blair's famous spider walk from The Exorcist can be seen in some of the movement, and the title is a tip-off to the creepy-crawly creatures the house's clandestine resident has been studying to hone its lethality. But is it human or supernatural, mortal or monster? Cobweb keeps the answers to those questions too vague to be satisfying." Monica Castillo of RogerEbert.com gave the film one out of four stars, writing, "While the strange and unusual world of Samuel Bodin's Cobweb has ample enough unsettling energy thanks to Philip Lozano's ominous cinematography, it fails to reach its scary ambitions."
