= Brad Furman =

American film director

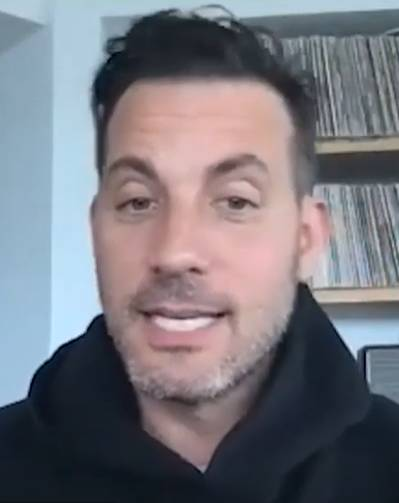
- Furman in 2021
- Born: Brad Evan Furman; Lafayette Hill, Pennsylvania, United States
- Occupations: Film director, producer, writer

Brad Furman is an American film and music video director, producer, and writer.

== Career ==
Furman grew up in Lafayette Hill, Pennsylvania. He is Jewish and attended Friends' Central School. He later went on to study at New York University (NYU) where he earned a BFA in film and TV from the Tisch School of the Arts. He also played Division III basketball for NYU.

Furman directed The Lincoln Lawyer, which starred Matthew McConaughey and was released in 2011. His next feature film was Runner Runner, which starred Justin Timberlake and Ben Affleck. Furman also directed the music video for "What Do You Mean?" by the singer Justin Bieber in 2015.

In 2016, Furman directed Bryan Cranston in The Infiltrator. The film is based on the autobiography of the same name by Robert Mazur, a U.S. Customs special agent, who in the 1980s helped bust Pablo Escobar's money-laundering organization by going undercover as a corrupt businessman.

== Filmography ==
- The Take (2007)
- The Lincoln Lawyer (2011)
- Runner Runner (2013)
- The Infiltrator (2016)
- City of Lies (2018)
- Tin Soldier (2025)
- People Not Places (TBA)
