= The Lincoln Lawyer (film) =

2011 U.S. film by Brad Furman

- Theatrical release poster
- Directed by: Brad Furman
- Written by: John Romano
- Based on: The Lincoln Lawyer by Michael Connelly
- Produced by: Sidney Kimmel; Tom Rosenberg; Gary Lucchesi; Richard Wright; Scott Steindorff
- Starring: Matthew McConaughey; Marisa Tomei; Ryan Phillippe; Josh Lucas; John Leguizamo; Michael Peña; Frances Fisher; Bob Gunton; Bryan Cranston; William H. Macy
- Cinematography: Lukas Ettlin
- Edited by: Jeff McEvoy
- Music by: Cliff Martinez
- Production companies: Lakeshore Entertainment; Sidney Kimmel Entertainment; Stone Village Pictures
- Distributed by: Lionsgate
- Release dates: March 10, 2011 (Hollywood); March 18, 2011 (United States)
- Running time: 118 minutes
- Country: United States
- Language: English
- Budget: $40 million
- Box office: $87.1 million

The Lincoln Lawyer is a 2011 American legal thriller film directed by Brad Furman and written by John Romano, based on the 2005 novel of the same title by Michael Connelly. It stars Matthew McConaughey as the titular lawyer, Mickey Haller. Ryan Phillippe, Marisa Tomei, Josh Lucas, John Leguizamo, William H. Macy, and Bryan Cranston also star.

The film's story is adapted from the first of several novels featuring the character of Haller, who works in a chauffeur-driven Lincoln Town Car rather than an office. Haller is hired to defend the son of a wealthy Los Angeles businesswoman in an assault case. Details of the crime bring up uncomfortable parallels with a former case, and Haller discovers the two cases are intertwined. The Lincoln Lawyer was released on March 18, 2011 by Lionsgate. It received generally positive reviews and grossed $87.7 million at the global box office.

== Plot ==
Criminal defense attorney Mickey Haller works in Los Angeles County, California, from the back of his black Lincoln Town Car, chauffeured by Earl Briggs. He typically works for low-end criminals including Eddie Vogel, leader of a biker gang. His ex-wife, Maggie McPherson, with whom he shares a daughter, is a district attorney who disapproves of his choice of clientele.

Haller is unexpectedly hired to represent Louis Roulet, a wealthy Beverly Hills playboy and the son of real estate mogul Mary Windsor. Roulet is accused of viciously beating prostitute Regina Campo, and surprisingly chose Haller specifically for the case. Haller and his investigator, Frank Levin, analyze photos and evidence and find similarities to a prior case where a prostitute was killed. Haller represented the defendant, Jesus Martinez, and due to the overwhelming evidence and in spite of Martinez's earnest proclamations of innocence, convinced him to plead guilty to avoid the death penalty.

Haller visits Martinez, who becomes agitated when he shows him Roulet's photo. Haller realizes that Roulet is likely the killer. His own hands tied, Haller tells Levin to investigate Roulet. When he gets back home, he sees that someone broke into his house. He stumbles upon Roulet, who learned that Haller visited San Quentin earlier. Roulet nonchalantly admits to committing the murder for which Martinez was convicted and says he chose Haller as counsel in order to bind Haller by attorney–client confidentiality rules and keep him from talking about either case. He also makes veiled threats towards Haller's daughter.

Later, Levin is found shot dead after leaving him a voicemail message claiming he found Martinez's "ticket out of jail." Haller learns that the bullet that killed Levin matches his late father's antique .22 Colt Woodsman, which is missing from its box; this means Roulet framed Haller for the killing. During the trial, Haller ruthlessly cross-examines Campo and discredits her. He also secretly sets up a known prison informant, Dwayne Jeffrey "DJ" Corliss, to testify against Roulet with furnished information on the previous murder. Haller is able to discredit DJ's testimony, getting Roulet's current charges dismissed. However, when Roulet is set free, the police arrest him immediately for the previous attack based on DJ's description.

Earl gives Haller a gun, acting on Haller's earlier request. Roulet's family gets him released due to lack of evidence and he goes to Maggie's home, where Haller is waiting, having monitored the tracking device still attached to Roulet. Haller vows that he will not stop until Martinez is freed and Roulet is convicted for his crime AND for killing Frank; Roulet mockingly tells him he cannot guard his family all the time; but the biker gang arrives on cue and bashes Roulet's luxury vehicle before beating him badly enough to send him to the hospital.

Maggie discovers Levin had found a parking ticket issued to Roulet near the murder victim's house, strong evidence against him. Upon arriving home, Haller is surprised by Roulet's mother, who had broken in. When Haller tells her he is going to get her son convicted of Frank's murder, she says "My son didn't kill him, I did" and shoots Haller with the Colt Woodsman. Hit in the midsection, Haller falls back and before Mary can fire again, he pulls his gun and kills her.

In the epilogue we learn that Martinez has been released and the DA is seeking the death penalty for Roulet. As Haller and Earl drive off, he is pulled over by Vogel and the biker gang, whose case he takes pro bono in gratitude for their help, though he reminds Earl he will charge more for later cases.

== Cast ==
- Matthew McConaughey as Mickey Haller
- Marisa Tomei as Maggie McPherson
- Ryan Phillippe as Louis Roulet
- William H. Macy as Frank Levin
- Josh Lucas as Ted Minton
- John Leguizamo as Val Valenzuela
- Michael Peña as Jesus Martinez
- Bob Gunton as Cecil Dobbs
- Frances Fisher as Mary Windsor
- Bryan Cranston as Detective Lankford
- Trace Adkins as Eddie Vogel
- Laurence Mason as Earl
- Margarita Levieva as Regina Campo
- Pell James as Lorna
- Shea Whigham as Dwayne Jeffrey "DJ" Corliss
- Katherine Moennig as Gloria
- Michael Paré as Detective Kurlen
- Michaela Conlin as Detective Sobel
- Mackenzie Aladjem as Hayley Haller
- Eric Etebari as Charles Talbot

== Reception ==
On the review aggregator website Rotten Tomatoes, 83% of 173 critics' reviews are positive, with an average rating of 6.7/10. The website's consensus reads: "It doesn't offer any twists on the predictable courtroom thriller formula, but with a charming Matthew McConaughey leading its solid cast, The Lincoln Lawyer offers briskly enjoyable entertainment." Metacritic, which uses a weighted average, assigned the film a score of 63 out of 100, based on 31 critics, indicating "generally favorable" reviews. The IMDB rating is 7.3 out of 10. Audiences polled by CinemaScore gave the film an average grade of "A−" on an A+ to F scale.

After watching a rough cut of the film on November 12, 2010, Michael Connelly, author of the book The Lincoln Lawyer, said:

The movie comes out March 18. A couple days ago I saw an unfinished cut of it and could not be happier. I thought it was very loyal to the story and the character of Mickey Haller. Matthew McConaughey nails him. Those who loved the book will love the movie, I think. Those who don't know the book will love it just the same. The casting and acting is really superb. Like I said, I could not be happier. I'm very excited and can't wait to see what fans of the book think.

Roger Ebert of the Chicago Sun-Times gave the film 3 stars out of a possible 4, saying, "The plotting seems like half-realized stabs in various directions made familiar by other crime stories. But for what it is, The Lincoln Lawyer is workmanlike, engagingly acted, and entertaining."

== Home media ==
The Lincoln Lawyer was released on Blu-ray and DVD on July 12, 2011. It was later released on 4K Ultra HD Blu-ray on August 15, 2017.

== See also ==
- The Lincoln Lawyer (soundtrack)
