= List of Manifest episodes =

Manifest is an American supernatural drama television series created by Jeff Rake that premiered on NBC on September 24, 2018. It centers on the passengers and crew of a commercial airliner, who suddenly reappear after being presumed dead for five and a half years. The series stars Melissa Roxburgh, Josh Dallas, Athena Karkanis, J. R. Ramirez, Luna Blaise, Jack Messina, Parveen Kaur, Matt Long, Holly Taylor, Daryl Edwards, and Ty Doran. On August 28, 2021, Netflix renewed Manifest for a fourth and final season, consisting of 20 episodes, split across two parts. Dallas and Roxburgh were set to return, with other original cast members in negotiations to return as well. The first part of the fourth season premiered on November 4, 2022. The second part of the fourth season was released on June 2, 2023.

During the course of the series, 62 episodes of Manifest aired over four seasons, between September 24, 2018, and June 2, 2023.

== Series overview ==
Season	Episodes		Originally released			Rank	Avg. viewership (in millions)
Season	Episodes		First released	Last released	Network	Rank	Avg. viewership (in millions)
1	16		September 24, 2018	February 18, 2019	NBC	9	12.61
2	13		January 6, 2020	April 6, 2020	NBC	38	7.70
3	13		April 1, 2021	June 10, 2021	NBC	54	5.35
4	20	10	November 4, 2022		Netflix	—N/a	—N/a
4	20	10	June 2, 2023		Netflix	—N/a	—N/a

== Episodes ==
=== Season 1 (2018–19) ===
No. overall	No. in season	Title	Directed by	Written by	Original release date	Prod. code	U.S. viewers (millions)
1	1	"Pilot"	David Frankel	Jeff Rake	September 24, 2018	T33.01003	10.40
On April 7, 2013, Montego Air Flight 828 from Jamaica to New York City experiences a brief period of severe turbulence. Upon landing, the flight is diverted to Stewart International Airport in Newburgh, New York. The passengers and crew learn that the current date is November 4, 2018—over five and a half years after takeoff. Police officer Michaela learns that her mother has died, and her fiancé, Jared, has married her best friend. Michaela soon begins hearing a voice that guides her to save a child from being hit by a bus and to rescue two abducted young girls. Medical researcher Saanvi learns that her work has helped save hundreds of pediatric cancer patients while she was gone. Michaela's nephew Cal, who is suffering from terminal cancer and was also on Flight 828, is a candidate for the treatment. Also experiencing headaches and hearing voices, Michaela's brother Ben and the rest of the returned passengers and crew are drawn to the airstrip where the plane is parked. As they look on, the plane explodes.
2	2	"Reentry"	Dean White	Jeff Rake & Matthew Lau	October 1, 2018	T30.10102	8.45
The NSA questions the 20 Flight 828 passengers and crew who were present when the plane exploded, and they are told not to discuss their experiences with the media. Ben helps fellow passenger Radd contact his son Adio, who is imprisoned at Rikers Island for a store robbery Radd thinks he did not commit. Ben's new abilities lead him to discover the real culprit is the store owner's son, and Adio is freed. Meanwhile, Michaela avoids Jared's wife—her former best friend Lourdes. Seeing the many posts and birthday messages Lourdes left for her on social media during the years Michaela was missing, Michaela contacts her and lies that she was planning to decline Jared's proposal before the plane disappeared. Ben learns from his daughter, Olive, that there is another man in Grace's life. Kelly, one of the passengers from Flight 828, speaks with the media, and is murdered.
3	3	"Turbulence"	Paul Holahan	Gregory Nelson & Bobak Esfarjani	October 8, 2018	T30.10103	7.45
Thinking Kelly's murder may be connected to her speaking out, Michaela and Ben visit the murder scene, and later speak to Kelly's husband Patrick and housekeeper Christine. The NSA takes control of the investigation, and Vance tries to compel Jared to keep him informed of Michaela's movements. Michaela is still traumatized by the death of her friend Evie, who was killed in a car wreck while Michaela was driving, for which Evie's parents Glen and Beverly blame Michaela. She visits Glen and Beverly and learns that Beverly has dementia while Glen is no longer angry at Michaela. Michaela later faces her fear of driving to find Beverly, who has wandered off, and saves her from being hit by a car. The driver is Christine, who is in possession of Kelly's missing necklace and later admits to killing her. Michaela tells Jared that something has changed in her that she cannot explain. Saanvi finds something unusual in Cal's blood, and then in her own, which is usually produced by an ischemic stroke. The NSA takes custody of Kelly's body.
4	4	"Unclaimed Baggage"	Craig Zisk	Laura Putney & Margaret Easley	October 15, 2018	T30.10104	7.46
A flashback reveals that flight attendant Bethany Collins smuggled her cousin Leo's boyfriend Thomas in the cargo hold, and the NSA found his fingerprints. Saanvi compares scans of her brain to those of an institutionalized patient and seeks him out. He turns out to be Thomas. When Michaela's partner is unavailable due to a "busted pipe", Jared reluctantly follows Michaela's instincts and they interrupt the ATF's undercover operation. Jared takes responsibility for his decision and is suspended. Grace learns the life insurance company intends to recollect the $500K which they paid her after Ben's disappearance and presumed death. Ben meets Grace's ex-boyfriend Danny after Olive was detained for attempting to shoplift a lipstick from a cosmetic store. Thomas escaped from the institution and the NSA is searching for him. With help from Michaela and Saanvi, Bethany correctly interprets the clues from Michaela's vision and they find Thomas. Bethany explains that Leo went missing two years after their flight disappeared, leaving no one to meet Thomas. Michaela and Saanvi help Bethany find a safe place in a building owned by Kelly Taylor. Robert Vance subsequently adds Thomas as "John Doe" to his Persons of Interest board, replacing Kelly Taylor.
5	5	"Connecting Flights"	Tawnia McKiernan	Amanda Green & Margaret Rose Lester	October 22, 2018	T30.10105	7.29
Flashbacks show how Grace, Olive, Jared, Lourdes, and Steve coped during the day when Flight 828 went missing. Jared's cover-up following the incident causes him to be docked 10 days pay thanks to Robert Vance. Ben and Cal go to Coney Island where Cal suddenly leads Ben to Thomas while quoting "it's all connected" which Ben has been hearing in his head. Bethany is picked up by the NSA to talk about the "John Doe" she snuck into the United States while her wife helps Thomas escape to a cabin in the mountains. After advice from her father, Michaela goes to speak to Jared at a bar. Ben and Cal learn from Bethany's wife Georgia that she got picked up by the NSA. Michaela learns from Ben about Cal not hearing voices like they do but still having abilities that manifest in a different way, causing Ben to dedicate himself to figuring the mystery out. In the final scene, a flashback shows Cal looking out the window while the passengers of Flight 828 are asleep as he sees something glowing outside and a voice stating that "it's all connected", the words that have begun haunting Ben.
6	6	"Off Radar"	Félix Enríquez Alcalá	Matthew Lau & MW Cartozian Wilson	November 5, 2018	T30.10106	6.28
When Cal develops an unexplained fever and begins speaking Bulgarian, Ben connects his condition to Marko Valeriev, a Bulgarian passenger on Flight 828 who has not been seen since leaving the hangar. Ben and Michaela review footage from the night the plane landed and see passengers loaded onto five buses, but only four arrived at their intended destination. The fifth bus contained eleven passengers who were foreign nationals, had no next of kin, or were otherwise individuals no one would report as missing. The buses were contracted by Unified Dynamic Systems (UDS), a large corporation involved in many industries. After getting some information from a translator, Michaela locates a farm where UDS is experimenting on the eleven passengers, but she and Jared are chased away by armed men. Ben confronts Vance about the missing passengers, believing the NSA is behind their disappearance and threatens to tell the press. Although Vance has dossiers on the eleven passengers showing they are accounted for, he leads a team to investigate the farm location. UDS has moved locations, but Vance finds a bloody bandage that was left behind by accident. When the experiments on Marko are stopped for the move, Cal recovers.
7	7	"S.N.A.F.U."	Michael Schultz	Jeff Rake & Bobak Esfarjani	November 12, 2018	T30.10107	6.10
Suspicious about Unified Dynamic Systems, Ben takes a low-level job at UDS's accounting firm, J. P. Williamson. Browsing their records, he finds information about fellow passenger Fiona Clarke. Michaela and Jared later respond to a crime scene where a young man's uncle was killed by a robber. The nephew, Carlos, is reluctant to identify the culprit. Ben and Saanvi meet Fiona, who informs them about the Singularity project and her work with mirror neurons. Ben downloads information on UDS at J. P. Williamson, but he is caught by Vance and surrenders the flash drive. Michaela convinces Carlos to cooperate, and they catch the culprit in the act of another attack. Later, Michaela learns that Carlos received Evie's heart in a transplant. Vance tells Powell that Ben did not have the downloaded information.
8	8	"Point of No Return"	Nina Lopez-Corrado	Gregory Nelson & Margaret Rose Lester	November 19, 2018	T30.10108	5.56
Ben and Grace allow Cal to return to school with Olive assisting Cal. After getting a "don't lose him" Calling, Michaela and Jared respond to a situation. Harvey, a Flight 828 passenger, jumps off a building after claiming he is the "Angel of Death". At school, Cal reconnects with his friends who are now 5 1/2 years older, and his presence sparks old memories among them. Vance contacts Ben and they agree to work together. They have Fiona visit her contacts at UDS and plant a bug in Laurence Belson's office. While grocery shopping, Grace meets Lourdes and notices a fertility kit in her shopping cart. Grace tells Michaela, who then discovers with Jared that three people Harvey interacted with are dead from unlikely accidents. Michaela gets the "don't lose him" Calling again. Ben secretly borrows his boss's work ID to get to research where UDS may have moved the passengers. Meanwhile, Vance uses NSA resources to track phones that have been in known UDS areas. Together, they narrow the search. The Singularity project staff prepares to work on Marko again, and Cal senses it.
9	9	"Dead Reckoning"	Paul Holahan	Laura Putney & Margaret Easley	November 26, 2018	T30.10109	5.97
When Flight 828 landed, Vance discovered a warrant for the arrest of passenger Autumn Cox, and she was one of the eleven taken by UDS. In the present, Autumn approaches Ben saying she escaped the Singularity project and knew he would help her. Ben enlists Saanvi and Fiona to help her at the hideout, where they tell Vance about the Singularity project and Laurence. Meanwhile, Laurence demonstrates his experiment in a broadcast to his superiors. Marko is tested with boosted power, causing all passengers to react. At the same time, Grace learns Ben has been fired from his job. Michaela, Jared, Vance, Ben, and Fiona find nothing at the warehouse, but Cal arrives and exposes a hidden door. There is a gun fight, and the missing passengers are freed. Vance, Jared, and Laurence are caught in an accidental explosion. Fiona escorts the missing passengers to a safe location. At a hospital with Jared, Michaela is told Vance died. Grace and Ben decide their marriage is no longer working and Ben leaves. Privately, Autumn uses a hidden cell phone to contact Laurence's superiors and ask what they want her to do next.
10	10	"Crosswinds"	Michael Smith	Amanda Green & MW Cartozian Wilson	January 7, 2019	T30.10110	5.84
As Ben leaves the memorial service for Vance, he is approached by "828Gate" podcaster Aaron Glover who wants to interview him. Fiona and Saanvi note that all of the rescued passengers have a simultaneous identical reaction, and arrange for some other passengers to visit them to see if they experienced a similar phenomenon. Michaela receives a vision of a blizzard and hears the words "find her". She and Jared find Helen, the wife of one of the passengers who has awoken with amnesia. She says her husband had been abusive to her. Autumn becomes frustrated with the pressure Laurence's superiors place on her. Olive invites Danny over for dinner in order to cheer up Grace. Ben persuades Vance's subordinate Tim Powell to help find info on "the Major", the shadowy figure in charge of the experiments on the passengers. Jared confesses to Michaela that he still loves her, and they sleep together. As Powell is picked up by people working for the Major, Autumn is visited by one of the Major's minions named Director Jansen who states that the Major wants to speak to her. Cal has a Calling where a man in a blizzard is holding a picture of Michaela as he quotes "find her".
11	11	"Contrails"	Marisol Adler	Matthew Lau & Bobak Esfarjani	January 14, 2019	T30.10111	5.46
In flashbacks, Captain Bill Daly and co-pilot Amuta fly Flight 828 through an unexpected storm. In 2018, Vance accuses Daly of questionable decisions. In the present, Bill tells Ben how he has been blamed for what happened to Flight 828 and the event separated him from his family. Michaela contacts Amuta, who supports Bill's claim but has returned to Jamaica. Bill and Ben meet with a meteorologist, Roger Mencin, who suspected dark lightning contributed to Flight 828 vanishing, but he was coerced into silence before he could share his views publicly. Director Jansen prompts Autumn to visit Michaela, who is watching Cal. Believing he can prove he was not at fault for Flight 828, Bill abducts Fiona, whom he believes was involved in the conspiracy. Bill flies a stolen airplane and Fiona into another dark lightning storm. The Air National Guard claims the airplane was shot down, but the media reports no wreckage was recovered. Meanwhile, Michaela learns Roger died in a suspicious boating accident and suspects Autumn overheard a conversation about him. Grace discovers Cal is missing.
12	12	"Vanishing Point"	Millicent Shelton	Jeff Rake & Gregory Nelson	January 21, 2019	T30.10112	5.37
Ben returns home to find Grace called the police about Cal's disappearance. Michaela apprehends Autumn and meets Ben. Jared tells the police Cal is at his grandfather's house and the search is ended. Finding a clue left behind by Cal, Ben and Grace try to find him in Tannersville, New York. Director Jansen learns Autumn is in police custody and informs the Major, who cancels the warrants so the police cannot hold her. Michaela learns that Autumn's daughter was adopted before Flight 828 returned and the Major had promised to reunite them. Michaela locates the daughter and Autumn tells the Major's men, who were also looking for Cal, to go in the wrong direction. Ben and Grace follow Cal's clues to a remote cabin. They reunite with Cal, who left home by himself to help a man at the cabin. Shortly after, a hiker named Zeke collapses at the cabin door. Michaela arrives and recognizes him from her last calling. He tells them he took shelter in a cave during a blizzard two weeks earlier, in December 2017. Ben informs him that it is currently December 2018. Meanwhile, the Major moves into a New York apartment.
13	13	"Cleared for Approach"	Constantine Makris	Laura Putney & Margaret Easley	January 28, 2019	T30.10113	5.54
Zeke asks Michaela to stay with him while Ben and Grace take Cal home. Shortly after, a brick is thrown through their front window as Ben discovers a large red X painted on their front door. While getting supplies for Zeke, Michaela learns about Chloe, Zeke's younger sister, who had died earlier in the same area. Jared ultimately connects the Stone's broken window to Cody Webber, who runs a conspiracy website (www.828demandthetruth.com) that trash-talks the Flight 828 passengers. Ben confronts Cody, unknowing that his threats are being live-streamed, and is taken away by the police. At the station, Jared warns Ben against retaliating against Cody again. Michaela and Zeke follow a calling to Chloe's memorial, where they build a cairn to pay their respects. Meanwhile, Saanvi tells Ben that Zeke has the same blood marker they do, based on the sample he brought her. That evening, she too finds a large red X painted on her lab door. Grace and Ben begin to reconcile. Michaela and Zeke find a petroglyph of two people standing under three stars, just as dark lightning forms in the sky.
14	14	"Upgrade"	Craig Zisk	Matthew Lau & Ezra W. Nachman	February 4, 2019	T30.10114	5.26
Michaela invites Zeke to stay at her apartment. Zeke has a calling about a black wolf, also experienced by Cal. Saanvi is asked to treat the cancer-stricken husband of a desperate woman named Alice Ciccone, a member of the "Church of the Returned", who believe Flight 828 passengers can perform miracles. When Saanvi cannot help the man, Alice forces her to continue at gunpoint. Ben believes something has happened to Saanvi after finding a church pamphlet in her office. Michaela admits to Lourdes her affair with Jared. Ben and Michaela head to Alice's house and rescue Saanvi. Ben confronts Adrian, the leader of the Church of the Returned and a Passenger, who admits he is a fraud. Director Jansen sees Ben at the Church and reports the news to the Major. Michaela goes to visit Lourdes and finds that Lourdes has left Jared. Cal shares a drawing of the black wolf with Michaela. She is then assigned to supervise the recovery of a getaway van from a robbery from the East River three days after it crashed. When she opens the van door she is lunged at by the driver, James Griffin, as he gasps for air.
15	15	"Hard Landing"	Claudia Yarmy	Gregory Nelson & Bobak Esfarjani	February 11, 2019	T30.10115	6.00
In a flashback, James Griffin kills two guards and his two accomplices during a robbery. In the present, James is taken to the hospital where Saanvi works after he is pulled from his getaway van. Griffin has a calling about a bomb threat which is overheard by Michaela, Jared, Ben, and Zeke, but he is sedated before they can learn more. Saanvi finds the blood marker in Griffin, and they realize he and his van were missing for 82 hours and 8 minutes. Michaela explains the callings to Griffin, who then decides to offer what he knows to the FBI in exchange for a reduced sentence. Meanwhile, Saanvi develops PTSD symptoms in response to the incident with Alice. Zeke is arrested while trying to break into a townhouse, which he tells Michaela belongs to his mother. The FBI grants Griffin immunity for the murders committed during the robbery and they defuse a bomb in Midtown Manhattan using information he gives them. Afterwards, Michaela has another vision of the black wolf.
16	16	"Estimated Time of Departure"	Dean White	Jeff Rake & Amanda Green	February 18, 2019	T30.10116	5.36
In a flashback, the Stone family vacation on a beach in Jamaica and pose for a photo. Griffin is released from police custody. Michaela, Ben, Saanvi, and Zeke all hear a calling to "Stop him". Suspicious of Zeke, Jared asks fellow officer Tony Diaz to follow him. Diaz sees Zeke purchase something in an alley. Michaela and Ben confront Griffin moments before he is about to reveal the callings on a TV talk show. Zeke is planning to shoot and kill Griffin to obey the calling. Suddenly, Griffin spews a massive amount of water, essentially dry drowning on a dry sidewalk. Olive and Ben calculate that Griffin died eighty-two hours and eight minutes after he returned – the same period of time he was gone. Ben calculates the Flight 828 passengers will all die on June 2, 2024, with Cal confirming he has had a vision of their deaths. Grace tells Ben she is pregnant, but that Danny is most likely the father. Dr. Matthews recommends a therapist to Saanvi for her PTSD, but the therapist turns out to be the Major. Jared confronts Zeke in Michaela's apartment, believing Zeke bought drugs in the alley. When Zeke reveals he actually bought a gun, Jared and Zeke engage in a fight. As Michaela returns to her apartment, the fight triggers a gunshot fired off-camera.

=== Season 2 (2020) ===
No. overall	No. in season	Title	Directed by	Written by	Original release date	Prod. code	U.S. viewers (millions)
17	1	"Fasten Your Seatbelts"	Joe Chappelle	Jeff Rake & Bobak Esfarjani	January 6, 2020	T30.10201	4.73
Michaela is hit by the stray shot, and she urges Zeke to flee the scene while Jared calls for help. Michaela has a calling involving Cal and a nosediving airplane. Grace and Ben share the news of the pregnancy with the rest of the family, but keep it secret from Danny. Michaela connects a reported missing couple named Anson and Trina Vasik with two flight 828 passengers. Ben notices a van watching him and other passengers. After Cal tells him to stay close to Michaela, Zeke turns himself in to the police. Ben and Michaela find Anson and Trina near the George Washington Bridge. They help them interpret their calling which revealed that a car containing a family is trapped on the cliff after the father had fallen asleep. Still posing as a therapist, the Major tells Saanvi she is wasting her time on therapy if she does not open up more. Ben confronts the occupants of the van and is abducted by someone who is revealed to be Vance.
18	2	"Grounded"	Claudia Yarmy	Laura Putney & Margaret Easley	January 13, 2020	T30.10202	3.49
Vance tells Ben that he pretends to be dead to better track The Major. Michaela attends Zeke's trial, where he pleads guilty to fleeing a crime scene. When Grace and Ben go to determine who fathered her baby, she gets a calling telling her to halt. They realize the baby must be Ben's and the callings can be transferred via DNA. When Olive is told, she feels alone as the only family member not having callings and visits the Church of the Returned. Saanvi reveals the news about the baby to the Major in a therapy session. Ben meets TJ, an 828 passenger and college student who is called to dig up the body of a female classmate. Jared arrests TJ when his fingerprints are found in her dorm room, but Michaela's callings help her reveal a security guard as the real perpetrator. Ben meets an old friend who is now the dean at TJ's college, and she recommends he apply to work there. Vance and Ben realize the Major has access to Saanvi's DNA research. Cal and Michaela have the same calling again as Zeke is kept drugged in a special cell.
19	3	"False Horizon"	Nathan Hope	Jeannine Renshaw & MW Cartozian Wilson	January 20, 2020	T30.10203	3.64
Olive continues to attend the Church of the Returned who have become more fervent in their beliefs while Michaela fights for Zeke in court. Aware someone is passing her research to the Major, Saanvi sets a trap and identifies a mole in her hospital and her therapist as the leak. Working with Ben and Vance, Saanvi identifies The Major as US Army Major General Kathryn Fitz, a specialist in psychological warfare. Meanwhile, Michaela testifies on Zeke's behalf as well as about Jared's breach of protocol; Zeke is allowed to plead to a misdemeanor and is released. Grace fails to fulfill a calling when it comes to a woman named Erika and a gargoyle. Ben is offered a job at TJ's college, but the hiring faculty member Simon White has a secret, sinister motivation; Erika is revealed to be his wife. Jared connects with a bartender named Tamara whose bar is frequented by the Xers, the group that has been harassing the 828 passengers.
20	4	"Black Box"	Sherwin Shilati	Simran Baidwan & Bobak Esfarjani	January 27, 2020	T30.10204	3.72
Michaela and Zeke share a Calling that leads them to an active bank robbery site. Michaela recognizes the gunman as an 828 passenger named Logan Strickland. He received the Death Date Calling and is looking for the content of a safety deposit box in the bank. Michaela and Zeke try to calm him and persuade the ESU to wait. They manage to enter the box thanks to a separate Calling that leads Ben and TJ to Logan's estranged brother Frank, who has the key. Logan and Frank reconcile and Logan gives himself up. Inside the box there is a compass with a bullet in it that saved Logan and Frank's grandfather during World War II. Logan believes it will save his life too, and he gives it to Michaela for safekeeping while he is incarcerated. TJ is upset about the Death Date and Olive takes him to the Church of the Returned for hope. The Major has Saanvi's research stolen from her lab and home. Saanvi tells Vance she has isolated the trait and investigating ways to both grant and remove it from people.
21	5	"Coordinated Flight"	Marisol Adler	Matthew Lau & Marta Gené Camps	February 3, 2020	T30.10205	3.55
Olive is the only witness when Xers vandalize the Church of the Returned and attack a member, and Ben receives a calling to "save her". Meanwhile, Grace's car is forced off the road by other Xers. In both instances, police dismiss the seriousness of the events because the victims are passengers and the attacks appear random. While being treated at the hospital, Ben and Grace learn their baby is a girl and assume the calling was about her. Ben and TJ review events and realize the Xer attacks have been carefully planned to divert police manpower. Olive tells Michaela what she saw and identifies a suspect, who directs the police to a meeting place for Xers. Jared knows Tamara's brother Billy was involved, so he leaks news of the coming raid to them and Michaela's strike team finds nothing. In return, Jared is introduced to Simon White, the organizer of the Xers. Meanwhile, Zeke tries to make amends with Courtney, a woman he wronged as an addict. She initially rejects him, but later identifies herself to Michaela as Zeke's wife. Olive tells her parents about visiting the Church of the Returned, Ben tells Adrian to stay away from Olive.
22	6	"Return Trip"	Mo Perkins	Laura Putney & Margaret Easley	February 10, 2020	T30.10206	3.70
Ben and Michaela learn Saanvi is trying experimental treatments on herself. Courtney asks for help with a large debt to a dangerous drug dealer named Lucas. Zeke and Michaela try to catch him in a sting operation. Michaela finds pills hidden in Zeke's razor. Ben and Saanvi share a calling about a young boy named Theo who they learn is 828 passenger Finn Nowak's illegitimate child. When they meet Theo, Saanvi recognizes signs of liver failure in the boy and Finn is a donor match. Meanwhile, Olive and TJ research an ancient tarot deck connected to a calling and learn its creator was a mariner named Al-Zuras. Grace is asked to participate in a magazine story about the first 828 baby. At Tamara's bar, Jared informs Billy how Michaela's return started to affect his life. Saanvi experiments on herself again, triggering a shared calling between herself, Michaela, Ben, and Adrian involving a crashed airplane and falling ash.
23	7	"Emergency Exit"	Jean de Segonzac	Jeannine Renshaw & Ezra W. Nachman	February 17, 2020	T30.10207	3.70
As Ben and others try to make sense of the crashed, smoldering airplane calling, he confronts Adrian to discuss his preaching and the negative attention it attracts. Olive and TJ share their research about the creator of the Al-Zuras tarot deck with Ben. Michaela confronts Zeke about the pills she found, but he claims to not know about them. Saanvi's latest experiment results in the elimination of the mutation. Meanwhile, numerous 828 passengers are invited to an event at the club where Isaiah works, with an offer of free champagne. However, the champagne has been spiked with gamma-Hydroxybutyric acid. Right after Cal gets a repeat calling to "save them", Isaiah locks the club's doors and starts a fire to prove the 828ers are miracles. While Ben, Michaela, Zeke and Jared are able to get several people out, numerous unnamed 828 passengers die from either the champagne or the fire as TJ throws himself on top of Isaiah. A distraught Adrian walks away from the fire.
24	8	"Carry On"	Nicole Rubio	Jeff Rake & Simran Baidwan	March 2, 2020	T30.10208	3.64
Olive is still devastated by the events at the nightclub. Following an Xer meeting, Simon advises Jared to keep an eye on Billy as he can be a loose cannon. Michaela and Drea witness Jared leaving the bar and kissing Tamara. After Drea infiltrates the bar and interacts with Billy, Michaela finds that Billy has had some arrest records. As the ruined nightclub is used for memorials, Ben's latest calling takes him to a zen meditation center. When he brings Olive, another chanting calling leads them underground where they find TJ still alive. With a warrant from Judge Trilling, Michaela secretly plants a bug in the bar, obtains evidence Jared is working with the Xers, and gives it to Bowers. Bowers privately shares the information with Jared. Saanvi kisses her former lover and fellow doctor, Alex, in a park. Alex, who is married, later confronts Saanvi at the hospital about the incident saying it cannot happen again, but Saanvi has no memory of the event.
25	9	"Airplane Bottles"	Ramaa Mosley	Matthew Lau & MW Cartozian Wilson	March 9, 2020	T30.10209	3.67
When Zeke goes to see Saanvi about the frostbite he is slowly developing, he finds that Saanvi has been developing short-term memory loss causing him to call in Alex. Two internal affairs agents arrive at the 129th Precinct to presumably discuss Jared's involvement with the Xers, but they instead question Michaela about her cases track record and her interactions with Isaiah. Michaela asks for a union representative to support her. Confronted by Jared, Simon says Michaela is a threat to be disposed of. Cal's latest Calling is shared with Ben, Grace, and a recuperating TJ, where they try to build something during what appears to be a thunderstorm outside. Thanks to some clues, they manage to pull together a makeshift ship's rigging, which briefly places them on an ancient boat from which they see Flight 828 in the sky; they also learn that the ancient mariners who tried to get rid of the Callings went mad. Alex is able to get a counter-agent injected into Saanvi and advises her to be careful. Recognizing the union rep from a previous Xer meeting, Jared has to arrest Michaela to keep her from getting killed by the union rep.
26	10	"Course Deviation"	Michael Smith	Laura Putney & Margaret Easley	March 16, 2020	T30.10210	4.29
After Michaela is bailed out, Jared and Kate reveal to her that Jared has been working undercover to disrupt the Xers. Ben and Grace follow a Calling to a bridge over the Harlem River and find Adrian, who had the same Calling. Grace's water breaks and Ben rushes her to the hospital. Adrian rescues a kayaker from the river. At the hospital, Ben has to make a choice to save Grace or the baby as the specialist surgeon has not arrived yet, and he chooses Grace (against her wishes). It turns out the specialist surgeon who can save both Grace and the baby is the man rescued by Adrian. Despite this, Adrian tells Ben he still does not believe the Callings are ultimately good. At the Xers bar, a bugged Jared finds that Billy and other Xers are holding Zeke captive. Simon arrives with Erika and orders Zeke to be killed. Michaela and others hear all through the bug, raid the bar and arrest Simon, Erika, Billy and two other Xers. Tamara accuses Jared of using her to capture the Xers which Jared denies. Adrian and Cal have visions of three mysterious shadowy figures.
27	11	"Unaccompanied Minors"	Andy Wolk	Jeannine Renshaw & Marta Gené Camps	March 23, 2020	T30.10211	4.12
As Zeke's Death Date approaches, Saanvi tries to convince him she is close to a cure. Ben and TJ get Callings that lead them to rescue a man from a suicide attempt. The man is Zeke's estranged father Gordon, and Ben helps a reluctant Zeke make peace with him. Michaela stops a teenager named Oscar fleeing a store, and he confesses to stealing a candy bar. Michaela gets a Calling to "let him go" and does so when Oscar boards a bus. She learns from the bodega owner that Oscar stole a large quantity of cold medication known to be used to cook methamphetamine. Michaela follows Oscar's steps with Jared, resulting in a bust at a meth lab run by ex-con Jace Baylor. Jace and his brother Pete were in cahoots with the bus driver Kory, who drove the bus that Oscar got on. At the lab, Michaela is urged again to "let him go", but has to ignore the Calling when Jace reaches for a weapon. Jace, Pete and Kory are revealed to be the three shadows from Adrian and Cal's Calling. Saanvi's access to her lab is denied and she is escorted out of the hospital.
28	12	"Call Sign"	Joe Chappelle	Simran Baidwan & Ezra W. Nachman	March 30, 2020	T30.10212	4.08
Jared and Drea try to get a confession from Jace, Pete, and Kory who seek revenge on Michaela and her family. Ben has a Calling to help a passenger who is racked with guilt, as he was also the man who inspected the plane just prior to Flight 828 taking off from Montego. Saanvi attempts to contact Vance for help getting her credentials back and protecting her from the Major. Vance reveals that The Major has done her own research on the mutation. Michaela and Zeke get married; Zeke's mutually estranged parents are both present, and Michaela's late mother appears to her in the empty chair that was reserved for her. Jace, Pete, and Kory engineer an escape from the bus that is taking them to Rikers. TJ reveals to Olive that he plans on going to Egypt to continue his studies. Jace, Pete, and Kory later kidnap Cal and hold him for a ransom of their confiscated drug stash.
29	13	"Icing Conditions"	Romeo Tirone	Jeff Rake & Matthew Lau	April 6, 2020	T30.10213	4.36
Michaela tells Ben and Grace about Cal's kidnapping and takes meth from police evidence to trade for his return, with help from Jared and Drea. A pedestrian notifies a patrol officer of the bag Michaela left behind, botching the trade as Jace flees with Cal. Zeke has a Calling which helps them locate Cal in the Catskill Mountains. At a remote cabin, Pete frees Cal. Michaela, Ben and Zeke approach the cabin as Cal leads the three criminals onto a frozen lake. All fall through the ice, but Zeke jumps in, saves Cal, then dies. Within minutes, Zeke comes back to life, appearing free from hypothermia and the Death Date. Ben concludes that the only way to beat the Death Date is to follow the Callings. Ignoring Vance's requests, Saanvi tracks down The Major and poisons her in hopes of gathering information. As the two struggle, the sole vial of antidote breaks and The Major dies. Ben has another Calling of Flight 828 exploding and crashing into the ocean. To Jared's disbelief, the bodies of the three criminals have disappeared from the frozen lake. A Cuban fishing boat recovers the tail of Flight 828 from the ocean.

=== Season 3 (2021) ===
No. overall	No. in season	Title	Directed by	Written by	Original release date	Prod. code	U.S. viewers (millions)
30	1	"Tailfin"	Romeo Tirone	Jeff Rake & Bobak Esfarjani	April 1, 2021	T30.10301	3.99
Ben and Vance are in Cuba to follow up on the tailfin. Upon touching it, Ben is thrown backwards, which is caught on camera by a local boy. A Cuban policeman sees the video and forces Ben to duplicate the incident, but Vance arrives to intervene. Ben as well as Vance's associate Emmett get on a plane to escape, leaving Vance to be apprehended by the DGI. Michaela and Zeke are on their honeymoon in Costa Rica when Cal discovers a recent Calling about 828 passenger Angelina Meyer. Michaela learns Angelina is being held captive in Costa Rica by her highly religious parents, who believe their daughter is possessed; she finds and rescues Angelina. Saanvi runs a private medical clinic where she also secretly pursues 828 leads. A woman visits the 129th precinct and talks to Jared, to report her mother, Kathryn Fitz, missing. Ben and Michaela discuss the tailfin, now believing that Flight 828 exploded and killed everyone but they were resurrected for still-unknown reasons. Jace, Pete, and Kory are shown emerging from the thawed lake and coming back to life.
31	2	"Deadhead"	Romeo Tirone	Laura Putney & Margaret Easley	April 8, 2021	T30.10302	3.15
Michaela gets her suspension lifted and reunites with Drea. They view park ranger footage of Jace, Pete, and Kory walking out of the lake. They learn the men assaulted two campers and stole their RV. Angelina has a haunting Calling that leads her to her old school and a time capsule containing an old photo of herself at a King Kone stand. Pete tells Jace they should flee to Canada. Jace agrees, but first tries to score money at the place he worked years ago: the King Kone. While there, Pete retrieves the photo that Angelina dropped. Jace and Kory leave without him and Pete is arrested by Michaela and Drea. Pete tells them the photo has both himself and Jace in the background. Elsewhere, Grace turns to her estranged stepbrother Tarik for a safe place for Cal now that the three meth heads are loose. Ben gets unexpected help from Tim Powell in rescuing Vance, while Zeke correctly deduces that Saanvi is troubled by something. News breaks of the discovery of a piece of Flight 828 in Cuba, and the Stone house is inundated by reporters looking for answers.
32	3	"Wingman"	Michael Smith	Simran Baidwan & Ezra W. Nachman	April 15, 2021	T30.10303	3.32
Vance is interrogated and asked by the NSA to rejoin, but refuses. A Calling leads Ben to highly intelligent 828 passenger Eagan. Eagan and Ben locate and rescue a teenager from a burning museum. The image of a peacock shows up in Egyptian artwork that TJ had given to Olive and in a vision by Cal. The artwork suggests a connection to the Egyptian goddess Ma'at. Eagan discards a key piece of the same artwork after selling artifacts he stole from the museum. Michaela follows a Calling to Evie's home to find Evie's father Glen dead from a massive heart attack and her mother Beverly alone and confused. Michaela and Zeke agree to take care of Beverly. Angelina visits Pete in jail and tells him she is compelled to help him like Michaela helped her. Jared questions an uncomfortable Saanvi about her discussions with Fitz during therapy. Vance is persuaded to rejoin the NSA and is told of Fitz's death cover-up.
33	4	"Tailspin"	Michael Smith	Marta Gené Camps & MW Cartozian Wilson	April 22, 2021	T30.10304	3.21
Two months later, Vance is heading the 828 task force for NSA. He invites Ben and Saanvi to view the operation, with the tailfin now added to the plane wreckage. Ben and Saanvi watch the security video of the tailfin vanishing: the time stamp on the screen coincides with Saanvi's fatal struggle with Fitz, and the day Zeke rescued Cal and beat the Death Date. Ben finds the body of dead 828 passenger Kelly Taylor in a restricted area. He learns the body no longer shows a bullet wound, but injuries consistent with a plane crash, and hypothesizes that the passengers could have died on the plane. Zeke uses his empathy powers to get Pete to reveal that his high school football coach was forcing Jace, Kory, and himself to deal drugs, resulting in a teammate's death. Michaela gets Pete to reveal that Jace is going to Coach Hannity's house to kill him. Kory tries to stop Jace and is wounded by him. At Hannity's, Michaela finds drugs in a vent with help from Kory and arrests Hannity. Jared and Drea learn more about Fitz's disappearance, as Emmett informs Vance that Jared is getting too close.
34	5	"Water Landing"	Marisol Adler	Matthew Lau	April 29, 2021	T30.10305	3.27
Jared's investigation forces Emmett - under the alias of Special Agent Fisher – to abduct him. Vance feeds him a story about Fitz being taken out by an enemy spy. Saanvi starts to understand the consequences of her choices. With only a day left until his Death Date, Jace goes on a bloody rampage trying to get revenge on Michaela, and Pete is taken to Eureka to have tests run on him. In Jace's trailer, Michaela finds a drawing that matches part of the ancient parchment on Maat. Levi suggests that it is a depiction of an ancient test called The Last Trial which featured three criminals whose stories match Jace, Kory, and Pete. The story suggests that if Jace forgives Michaela and seeks redemption instead of vengeance, he will be spared. In exchange for Vance allowing Pete to help Michaela confront Jace at the lake, Ben agrees to allow Eureka to experiment upon him. After Tarik brags at a bar about the 828-themed restaurant he wants to open with Grace, the family's location is revealed on the internet by a reporter who overheard Tarik's pitch. While searching for Jace, Zeke is knocked unconscious, leaving an oblivious Michaela alone in her search.
35	6	"Graveyard Spiral"	Sherwin Shilati	Laura Putney & Margaret Easley	April 29, 2021	T30.10306	3.21
While continuing his fight with Michaela, Jace experiences a Calling of Cal and thinks his survival is connected to him. Jace kicks Michaela off of a cliff and goes after Cal. Michaela is later rescued by Zeke. Tarik, Grace, Cal, and Eden are stuck in Tarik's house after the tires on both of their cars are found slashed. Jace learns their location from Michaela's police car radio and ambushes them, Ben, Pete, and Angelina. Jace tells Pete about his theory. Kory protects Cal and Jace kills Tarik, leading a vengeful Grace to attempt to kill him. Ben convinces Grace to spare Jace. Jace, reaching his Death Date, spews lake water and dies. Pete and Kory's injuries heal, apparently beating their Death Date. Michaela promises Pete an early release from prison, and Angelina promises to wait for him. Using the parchment and the returned final missing piece stolen by Eagan, Olive discovers that as the three men were resurrected together, they are being judged together. A shadow rises from Jace's body, grabs Pete and Kory, and causes them to die for a second time. Ben and Michaela are stunned by this realization, while Angelina is devastated to lose Pete.
36	7	"Precious Cargo"	Romeo Tirone	Bobak Esfarjani & Ezra W. Nachman	May 6, 2021	T30.10307	3.05
Furious about Pete's death, Dr. Gupta dismisses Ben and Saanvi from the Eureka project. Michaela, Eagan, and several other 828 passengers get a Calling of a dark cloud over the east wing of the building that houses the Eureka team, and see Ben leaving the building. Eagan and two others take Ben with them to Eagan's house, where Ben admits he has allowed himself to be a research subject. He agrees to investigate about the east wing, apparently a loading dock. Ben shares the news about the three meth heads and the concept of the Lifeboat: everyone from 828 will be ultimately judged together. Michaela and Drea locate Ben when it turns out that the house they are in does not belong to Eagan. However, Ben has already agreed to work with Eagan and bails him out of jail. Cal and Angelina deal with guilt over Tarik's and Pete's deaths. Jared gets closer to Major Fitz's daughter Sarah. Saanvi discovers sapphire-related material in people that have returned and died. Gupta later decides to retain Saanvi following her breakthrough, then shows her a sealed container marked with the crossed keys of the Vatican.
37	8	"Destination Unknown"	Claudia Yarmy	Eric Haywood & Marta Gené Camps	May 6, 2021	T30.10308	2.85
The object in the container is revealed to be an old piece of wood coated with the same minerals as 828 passengers. Ben and Michaela follow similar Callings which lead them to 828 passenger Rachel Hall. Rachel is about to murder her abusive ex-husband Jonah, who married her sister Hannah during Rachel's 5+ years absence and is now also abusing Hannah. Ben intervenes to stop Rachel, sets off the silent alarm, and all three of them are arrested by the police. Ben explains to an angry Michaela that he is putting himself in danger for the sake of the 828 "lifeboat". Jonah is arrested and Hannah agrees to testify on Rachel's behalf. Meanwhile, Saanvi determines the ancient wood is 6,000 years old and finds animal DNA on it, later learned to be from a peacock. When Gupta says the wood was expelled from a long-dormant volcano on Mount Ararat, she and Saanvi discuss the possibility that it could be from Noah's Ark. Michaela and Drea notice that Jared is becoming romantic with Sarah Fitz.
38	9	"Bogey"	Laura Belsey	Simran Baidwan & MW Cartozian Wilson	May 13, 2021	T30.10309	2.95
Ben and Eagan get ominous dark cloud Callings. In a mirror, Michaela sees blood coming from her eyes. Eagan and Ben join forces upon a shared vision of a lion with bleeding eyes and a wet photo of Saanvi on Ben's wall. In Eureka, Saanvi's eyes start to bleed while running experiments bombarding the ancient wood with a dark lightning simulator. Ben hears of it and asks Olive and Levi for research support. The two uncover a legend suggesting the eyes are a symbol of deception. Eagan and Ben see a glowing copy of Al-Zuras's journal, which Ben picks up. Michaela visits Saanvi, whose condition has medical experts stumped. Saanvi's eyes immediately clear up when she admits to Fitz's killing and the cover-up by Vance. Gupta and Saanvi watch slo-mo footage of her experiment: the ancient wood flickers out of existence for several milliseconds before reappearing. Elsewhere, Zeke's empathy powers reassure him about Jared and Sarah being a good couple. Angelina starts mimicking Olive in look and behaviour, upsetting her. Ben is worried about the meaning of the latest Callings for the 828 Lifeboat and one of the Al-Zuras drawings, which shows ancient mariners drowning either by self-sacrifice or after being thrown overboard.
39	10	"Compass Calibration"	Ramaa Mosley	Laura Putney & Margaret Easley	May 20, 2021	T30.10310	2.85
An earthquake hits New York. Saanvi sees TV news coverage of a fissure in a road with lava underneath, right at the epicenter of the quake, and hypothesizes Mount Ararat is reclaiming the piece of Noah's Ark. She and her colleague Troy engineer a ruse in the next experiment to smuggle the piece of wood out of the building. Ben and Cal have a Calling of 828 passenger Astrid's photo in flames, and find that Astrid herself has received a Calling of a boy in danger: the son of anti-828er Cody Webber, with whom Ben had a scuffle and for which he received a restraining order. Upon Webber's refusal to reveal his son's whereabouts, Ben assaults Webber again and is arrested by Jared. However, Michaela and Astrid are able to rescue the child from earthquake debris. At the Stone's home, an incident during the earthquake makes Angelina believe that Eden is her guardian angel. Cal agrees that he, Angelina, and Eden all have a connection. Angelina decides to test her theory and starts a fire, forcing Grace to evict her over Cal's objection. With help from Troy and Cooper, Saanvi tosses the ancient wood into the road fissure, closing it. Immediately, Cal gets another Calling.
40	11	"Duty Free"	Ruba Nadda	Bobak Esfarjani & Darika Fuhrmann	June 3, 2021	T30.10311	2.78
Unbeknownst to Grace, Cal is hiding Angelina in his room. Angelina has delusions of being an Aaron to Cal's Moses. Ben's arraignment for the fight with Cody Webber takes a turn for the worse when he draws an anti-828 judge. To pay for the enormous bond, Grace retrieves her restaurant deposit and mortgages the house. Michaela and a guilt-ridden Ben learn that government agencies worldwide are tightening the reins on 828 passengers. This comes to a head when it's learned that a passenger was just executed in Singapore. Ben, Michaela, Cal, and several other 828-ers have Callings of being on fire and Saanvi decides to turn herself in. On her way, she stops at Eureka, confesses to Vance about the piece of wood, and learns about ongoing experiments on the tailfin. When Saanvi arrives to the police station, Michaela turns in her badge and whisks her away. Ben is released from jail and is seen talking with Vance by an apprehended Eagan, who explodes with rage. Adrian, who had been laying low since the club fire, is also in custody. At Angelina's urging, Cal shows up at the gates of Project Eureka asking to see the tailfin.
41	12	"Mayday, Part 1"	Dean White	Simran Baidwan & Marta Gené Camps	June 10, 2021	T30.10312	2.76
After learning from Vance that Cal is at Eureka, Olive puts on Ben's ankle monitor so that Ben and Grace can go get Cal. They find out that Cal has a Calling that's burning his skin, and it will not stop until Eureka stops testing on the tailfin. Saanvi keeps Cal under treatment while Ben and Grace beg Dr. Gupta to stop the testing. Ben wants to destroy the tailfin but gets a Calling revealing that he needs to return it to the ocean. Vance tries to intervene, but Gupta gets authorization to continue testing from headquarters. Cal tells them that Gupta needs to see in order to believe. He touches the tailfin and disappears. Meanwhile, Michaela gets a shared Calling with Bethany, Eagan, and Adrian, where Flight 828 is dripping blood from the ceiling, and concludes that it is a warning about someone dying. She asks them for help to solve the Calling before someone dies, but Eagan and Adrian refuse to help.
42	13	"Mayday, Part 2"	Romeo Tirone	Jeff Rake & Matthew Lau	June 10, 2021	T30.10313	2.76
To get Cal back, Ben and Vance plan to steal the tailfin while Grace and Olive piece together Cal's drawings for clues. Recognizing a constellation in the drawings as a sign from her late grandmother, Dr. Gupta allows them to take the tailfin into a dark lightning storm. Eagan and Adrian incite a group of passengers, including Angelina, claiming that the Stones are working with the NSA. This results in Eagan and another passenger holding Vance's son hostage. Saanvi is rescued by Ben from the ocean after she releases the tailfin, which then vanishes. Angelina sneaks into the Stone house, stabs Grace with a knife, and leaves with Eden. An adult version of Cal appears and kneels by his mother's side as she dies. As Dr. Gupta leaves Eureka, she turns and sees Bill Daly appear in the reconstructed plane before both he and the plane disappear.

=== Season 4 (2022–23) ===
No. overall	No. in season	Title	Directed by	Written by	Original release date	Prod. code
Part 1
43	1	"Touch-and-Go"	Romeo Tirone	Jeff Rake & Simran Baidwan	November 4, 2022	T30.10401
Flashbacks show the aftermath of Grace's murder and the Stone family's reaction to Cal's return. Two years later, a disheveled Ben tries in vain to find Eden though evidence suggests she is dead. A Calling regarding a container ship with sakura petals leads Michaela to find fellow passenger Henry Kim, supposedly dead, who reveals that he brought the 828 black box for Cal after escaping China. Zeke is working as a psychiatrist able to absorb the emotions and pain of others by touching them. Cal is visited by Saanvi, but has no memory after he vanished when he touched 828's tailfin. Ben has a Calling in which he encounters 828 passenger Anna Ross. Together, they find and rescue a father and son. After returning home, Anna is revealed to be hiding Angelina and Eden.
44	2	"All-Call"	Dean White	Laura Putney & Darika Fuhrmann	November 4, 2022	T30.10402
A fleeing Angelina dyes and cuts her and Eden's hair to hide their identities. She seeks refuge with a woman who then locks her in a room. At a new police division office, called "the registry", passengers from 828 have to regularly check in. Adrian rescues Angelina and Eden after receiving a Calling. Though still appalled by Angelina's actions, Adrian nonetheless agrees to shelter her and Eden at his compound. Ben tracks down a lead and is led back to Anna's house, who confesses that she had sheltered Angelina and Eden, convinced by Angelina that Ben was evil, but knows now she had been lied to. While there, Ben sees Eden's drawings and realizes that he and Eden shared a Calling. Meanwhile, Saanvi, listening to the black box, manages to modulate the frequency and is able to hear all the Callings that Ben, Michaela, Cal, Saanvi, and Zeke have ever had. Cal discovers a dragon-shaped scar on his arm.
45	3	"High Flight"	Marisol Adler	Margaret Easley & MW Cartozian Wilson	November 4, 2022	T30.10403
At Adrian's compound, Angelina tests her connection with Eden by trying to draw the same picture and fails. Reinvigorated by the knowledge that his daughter is alive, Ben is helped by Jared and Drea in following Angelina's tracks. Michaela and Cal have a Calling of thunder and lightning. Michaela discovers that the thunder Calling is shared by Amuta, the 828 co-pilot. Initially reluctant to follow it, he admits to knowing what happened during the six seconds in which all Callings were recorded in the black box: a "long, delirious, burning blue" that the plane went through and left a sense of peace. Hearing this, Cal finally remembers being back on the plane with Captain Daly and Fiona right after he touched the tailfin and disappeared, and sheds light on Daly's reappearance when he tried to stop Cal from going back. Concerned with the wellbeing of the other resident passengers, Adrian asks Eagan for advice and reveals Angelina and Eden's whereabouts. Relentlessly bullied in prison, Eagan sees an opportunity to make a deal with Ben.
46	4	"Go-Around"	S. J. Main Muñoz	Matt K. Turner & Ezra W. Nachman	November 4, 2022	T30.10404
On Evie's death anniversary, Michaela has a Calling involving fog and a Thunderbird that takes her to the Shinnecock Reservation and a fellow 828er named Kyle Boyd. With Zeke and Drea's help, they reach Kyle's mother in a New York hospital and take her back to the Hopi Reservation for her final days, freeing Kyle from his guilt. He leaves a quilt as a gift for Michaela. The star embroidered on it turns out to be the last clue for Cal and Olive to finally understand where Cal and the whole Flight 828 was for 5 and a half years – inside the "divine consciousness". Meanwhile, Vance uses all leverage he has left to help Ben free Eagan and obtain the location of Eden's whereabouts: Adrian's compound. However, Ben has an ominous Calling about this. After sending Vance and his right-hand man Emmett on a false track to protect Vance and Emmett, Ben reaches the compound and is knocked out. Meanwhile, Jared and Drea connect a suspicious purchase of fertilizer rich in ammonia, potentially used in bomb-making, to Erika, one of the residents of the compound.
47	5	"Squawk"	Mike Smith	Simran Baidwan & Sumerah Srivastav	November 4, 2022	T30.10405
Erika shows Angelina one of the bombs she has created with the fertilizer and disseminated in each room, ready to go off in case of a police raid. Jared and Michaela separately figure out that Ben is kept prisoner at the compound, and they go there with Zeke. Ben reveals to one of the residents that Adrian is harboring Angelina, who then confronts Adrian about it. Adrian says he will get rid of Angelina, who menaces to detonate the bombs as "trial by fire" for all of them. At Vance's research facility, Saanvi experiments on Cal in an fMRI while he has a Calling of Ben and Eden in trouble, finding that Callings are memories of the time spent in the "divine consciousness". Guided by his Calling, Cal enters the house and confronts Angelina alone, paving the way for the others to rescue the residents, then shooing Ben and Eden away from danger. Angelina triggers the bombs and the compound explodes. Cal is miraculously alive. Zeke's out of control empathy powers perceives Erika's rage and shoots her with Jared's gun to save Michaela. At home, Cal coughs blood. Adrian rescues a wounded Angelina and drives away.
48	6	"Relative Bearing"	Harvey Waldman	Laura Putney & Ryan Martinez	November 4, 2022	T30.10406
In the aftermath of the compound explosion, the Stones, Zeke, and Jared try to adjust to the latest events. Angelina finds refuge at her mother Noelle's house. A Calling takes Michaela to the murder scene of a passenger, Sam Wile. Ben struggles to undo Angelina's damage and connect to Eden where he asks for Anna's help. Eagan is released from prison and is assaulted by Adrian. Zeke is overwhelmed during a session and hits a patient after absorbing his anger, leading to his firing. Jared and Drea find that an 828 Registry police captain, Ted Colvin, is involved in the murder and they arrest him. However, Colvin was only taking bribes while the real murderer is still on the loose and assaults Anna at her house. Angelina calls the Stones several times to speak to Eden. Cal briefly lets her through, angering his father. Olive thinks sapphire is the key to limitless Callings that can help in getting the Lifeboat back on track, and she calls TJ in Egypt. After an argument with Ben, Cal attempts to run away, but collapses outside where he is then found by a drunk Zeke.
49	7	"Romeo"	Josh Dallas	Ezra W. Nachman & Darika Fuhrmann	November 4, 2022	T30.10407
Jared and Michaela investigate Sam and Anna's murders and discover that both had temporarily sheltered Angelina and Eden. Cal consults Saanvi's ex Alex and she determines that his cancer has returned. She persuades Zeke to resume attendance at AA meetings. Eden has a Calling that takes Ben and Saanvi to a nursing home where they find the missing UDS passenger, who have since been declared brain-dead. They still have brain activity and Saanvi persuades an orderly to let her see their medical records. She has a Calling and hypothesizes that the Major's experiments made them into living antennae to the Divine Consciousness. Cal, under his alias Gabriel, goes on a date with fellow passenger Violet and reveals his true identity to her. Violet confesses that she helped Angelina in the past. Michaela and Jared meet a hostile Noelle, but further clues point away from Angelina. Later, they are informed of a third murder. Eden finally warms to Ben, who can now help Michaela with her latest Calling, which is not a bloody X but a cross implicating Noelle. Jared warns that Violet has been murdered and the Registry believe "Gabriel" is now the prime suspect.
50	8	"Full Upright and Locked Position"	Erica Watson	Matt K. Turner & Jimmy Blackmon	November 4, 2022	T30.10408
Cal is arrested by the arriving 828 Registry officers as the suspected serial killer. Michaela thinks Noelle is going to target Adrian next, while Eagan has a Calling about him. When the two find that Adrian has been abducted, they agree to join forces. Noelle anesthetizes and binds Angelina with Adrian so that she can witness his death. After Saanvi unsuccessfully tries to use sapphire to boost Eagan's Calling to pinpoint Adrian, Olive thinks they need an Omega Sapphire. A Calling reunites Ben with Radd, leading them to follow a musical Calling that leads them to Alex confirming that Cal's cancer has returned. Radd uses it as the reason to release him from custody. Adrian frees Angelina from her bindings, but she leaves him to die. Vance, Jared, and Michaela save Adrian from being drowned by Noelle at the last minute, but Drea reveals that evidence suggests that Noelle may not be the only killer. Meanwhile at Ben's house, Angelina's dad, Kenneth, breaks in to kill Eden to show Angelina that she is not her guardian angel. Olive is able to push him out the second floor window in self-defense and save them. As Noelle is booked for attempted murder, Jared is offered to transfer to the 828 Registry as a detective by Colvin's successor, Captain Fahey. Olive receives an unexpected visit by TJ who hints that the Omega Sapphire might be found in New York. Having secretly deciphered one of Marko's drawings, Eagan goes to the drawing's location of where he thinks the sapphire is: the Masonic Temple of the Omega Order.
51	9	"Rendezvous"	Cheryl Dunye	MW Cartozian Wilson & Sumerah Srivastav	November 4, 2022	T30.10409
A month later, Alex and Saanvi tell Cal that he is not responding to treatment and he only has days left to live. Cal and Ben decide to keep it between them as Zeke and Michaela celebrate their wedding anniversary that evening. Eagan sneakily explores the Temple, but is seen chipping out tiles from several walls by a fellow volunteer named Kenroy. The Stones and their friends enjoy a joyful evening until Michaela, Saanvi, Cal and Ben have a Calling of the 828 plane in turbulence involving Jared, Zeke, Olive, the stowaway passenger Thomas, and the unresponsive Marko. Saanvi and Michaela are led by a Calling to the boiler room where Thomas used to hide. Through an adjacent wall comes Eagan and Kenroy who is really Thomas' former partner Leo. Olive and TJ link Eagan's tiles and the ones revealed behind a different wall in the room to Al-Zuras tarot cards. Meanwhile, Marko is brought by Jared and Zeke to Cal's presence and draws a volcano, previously seen in other Callings and in the "World" tarot card. Michaela ignites a fire grate and the wall crumbles, revealing a bas-relief of the goddess Maat and the sapphire at its center. Eagan takes the Omega Sapphire and triggers a collapse of the room then runs off, leaving Michaela, Saanvi, and Leo trapped in the debris. Drawn in by a Calling, Thomas saves them and reunites with Leo. Cal reveals his condition to Olive and the others. Another Calling leads everyone to realize that the Death Date actually marks the end of the world. Eagan is assaulted in his hotel room and the Omega Sapphire taken away by a mysterious figure.
52	10	"Inversion Illusion"	Romeo Tirone	Jeff Rake & Margaret Easley	November 4, 2022	T30.10410
Ben has a vision of Grace who asks him to take Eden to her grave. At the hospital, Eagan tells Michaela and Jared that Angelina has the Omega Sapphire. At the cemetery, Ben finds out it is a ruse by Angelina to take back Eden and takes her away. Angelina's rage, amplified by the sapphire, affects all 828 passengers. With Olive's help, Michaela and Ben find Angelina keeping people hostage in the church at her old school where the Omega Sapphire has manifested lava. Cal's dragon scar allows him to create a Calling of the plane, and to fight Angelina. During the fight, the Omega Sapphire is shattered. The US government initiates an emergency order to detain all 828 passengers until further notice, and a Registry team led by Dr. Gupta breaks into Vance's lab. Zeke sacrifices himself to save Cal. A delirious Angelina manages to escape the school with a piece of Omega Sapphire stuck in her lava-burned hand as lava crevices start to appear.
Part 2
53	11	"Final Descent"	Romeo Tirone	Jeff Rake & Simran Baidwan	June 2, 2023	T30.10411
Eight months following the detainment of all 828 passengers, Ben is visited by Olive and Eden while a grieving Michaela has a vision of Zeke, and Saanvi does research on the 828 passengers. Bethany has a Calling involving her wife, Georgia, causing her to frantically try to get out, only to be sedated. Vance secretly helps Michaela and Ben escape so that they can solve the Calling. After visiting Olive and Cal, who interprets Bethany's Calling, Michaela and Ben visit Zeke's mother Priscilla, who gives them her car and some money to help support Cal and Olive. Upon meeting up with Georgia, they head to a barn where Ben and Georgia are attacked by their old X-er enemy Billy. Michaela helps subdue him and leaves him taped to his car where he is later found by Jared and Drea. Georgia is advised to get to the 828 safe house. While walking down the road, Michaela has another vision of Zeke. Upon surrendering, Ben whispers to Vance about an impact site he found in the ground past the orchard. While in solitary confinement he finds that Michaela also surrendered, as they both have to "keep the lifeboat afloat". Vance finds the site in the orchard. At the detention center, NSA Director Zimmer enters a room where Captain Daly is strapped to a bed and has him sedated.
54	12	"Bug Out"	Romeo Tirone	Margaret Easley & Darika Fuhrmann	June 2, 2023	T30.10412
Following the events from eight months prior, Angelina is shown hiding in a homeless camp in St. Louis, Missouri. Zeke visits Michaela, still in solitary confinement, telling her about the moments in their lives when they could have met. Right after, Michaela is called in by Zimmer and Vance to help Jared solve a Calling received by passenger Joe whose son Charlie was taken from him when detained. In a trance, Ben scratches the words "WAKE HIM UP" on the walls of the confinement yard. Once awakened, he and Saanvi discover he etched a map of the detention center and marked a location: it is where Captain Daly is kept prisoner. Saanvi revives Daly as a moving lump is seen under his skin. With help from Jared's brother Luis, Jared and Michaela follow a clue to a jewelry store. Cal voluntarily enters Joe's Calling and finds another clue, leading Jared and Michaela to rescue Charlie and several children hidden behind a fake wall, and they arrest the jewelry store owner for child trafficking. Jared sets Charlie up with Luis whose family will foster him until Joe is released. Cal visits Daly's plane crash site and the barn and finds an unconscious Fiona Clarke in the basement cellar. After Zimmer confronts an awakened Daly, he suddenly releases a swarm of insects from his mouth.
55	13	"Ghost Plane"	SJ Main Muñoz	Matt K. Turner & Sumerah Srivastav	June 2, 2023	T30.10413
Cal brings Fiona home, finding her in a zoned-out state, which he and Olive believe is a Calling. Olive visits Ben about this as he shows her the insect that infested the 828 Detention Center, which she identifies as a locust. Ben tells Michaela and Jared about a Calling regarding the Mansion Marina and a boat moored at Slip 57. This leads them to an encounter with Eagan's father Nazir who has a strained relationship with Eagan. Believing he can see Fiona's Calling by sitting in her seat on the plane, Cal returns to the plane and finds two olive trees in place of where Captain Daly and Fiona were sitting and he manages to bring back two olives from the trees with him. At the 828 Detention Center, Zimmer is told that some of the guards have died from the boils that appeared on Daly. When Fiona has trouble breathing, Cal taps into the Divine Consciousness to speak to Saanvi who walks Cal through setting up a chest tube. Ben, Michaela, and Nazir find Eagan's mom Farnaz who had been manipulated into staging her own break-in. With information that Ben learned from Eagan, Michaela and Jared learn that Eagan's protégé Cheryl has been conning the relatives of those in the 828 Detention Center. They managed to set a trap for Cheryl and apprehend her. Nazir and Farnaz visit Eagan at the 828 Detention Center, and their relationship improves. Familiar with the information about the two olive trees, Angelina uses the Omega Sapphire to manipulate Eden into believing Olive wants the straw removed from Fiona. This ends up killing Fiona.
56	14	"Fata Morgana"	Claire Fowler	MW Cartozian Wilson & Ryan Martinez	June 2, 2023	T30.10414
Angelina makes her way to New York to begin her next plot. When the water in the 828 Detention Center turns to blood, an emergency lockdown is initiated. Saanvi persuades Captain Daly's estranged son Patrick to donate some blood and bone marrow hoping to stop the plagues. Michaela helps pregnant detainee Polly deliver her baby when she goes into labor early. After a talk with Eden, Olive learns from Cal that Angelina is still alive. Cal projects himself to Angelina where she tries to get him to side with her to no avail. When Jared and Vance arrive, they learn what happened to Fiona, as Cal gives a description of where Angelina is hiding out. Jared arrives at a highway bridge at I-80 where Angelina's van is located. Angelina uses the illusion of Daly's son Patrick to taunt Daly into breaking out of his room. Despite Ben trying to persuade them not to, the guards shoot Daly and he dies in Ben's arms. Jared finds Angelina and arrests her for the murder of Grace and the kidnapping of Eden. He is informed about what Angelina did with the Omega Sapphire. Michaela has a final chat with Zeke who is starting to head back to 2018 as she advises him to leave the cave to find her. Angelina is brought into the Detention Center.
57	15	"Throttle"	Romeo Tirone	Laura Putney & Ezra W. Nachman	June 2, 2023	T30.10415
After ignoring Ben's advice on Angelina, Director Zimmer cuts a deal with her to deliver the fugitive 828ers to her in exchange for a release. Michaela's father Steve collapses after giving her a message from Olive for TJ. After receiving a Calling about some woods and a stream, Ben tells Michaela to use it to get Director Zimmer to let her and Jared out of the Center to investigate, so she can see her father. Amuta turns himself in upon being fooled by Angelina's illusion of Daly, leading Ben to figure out that Zimmer used Angelina to lure Amuta there. Drea cuts out Michaela's tracking chip so she can see her dad in the hospital, learning that Steve has suffered a stroke. Ben persuades Zimmer to let him speak to the press where he includes "chicken coop," the safehouse's panic word, in his speech. After finding the safe house empty, an enraged Zimmer orders Saanvi to cut the Omega Sapphire out of Angelina, only for it to be absorbed into Angelina's body. Ben forces Saanvi's prototype cure on Angelina which causes her to scream enough to cause all 828ers to pass out and lose their Callings. Eagan grabs a janitor's badge and sneaks Angelina out of the 828 Detention Center. As Zimmer transfers Saanvi to another department, TJ, having received Olive's note, figures out with Ben that the world is ending.
58	16	"Furball"	Stacy Muhammad	Matt K. Turner & Darika Fuhrmann	June 2, 2023	T30.10416
Michaela and Jared take care of Steve at Tarik's house. An earthquake occurs that swallows Captain Daly's body. Following this, Director Zimmer initiates the Isolation Protocol to leave the 828 passengers in the Center. A dismayed Vance sneaks key cards to Ben. Ben and TJ are reunited with Olive and Eden after the latter snuck off before the protocol was initiated. Angelina and Eagan find a safe house for refugees who order the former to leave, but Eagan helps her win them over. A guard attempts to shoot the passengers but is talked down by Ben and Eden. Vance reunites with Cal, and they follow a Calling regarding numbers that leads them to rescue Michaela from Tom, an Xer. Additionally, his van, which was supposed to deliver Freon to the Detention Center, was found to be loaded with Sarin gas. As Ben rallies the 828 passengers, Cal enters the Divine Consciousness where he discovers he can detect everyone's Callings.
59	17	"Threshold"	Bosede Williams	MW Cartozian Wilson & Sumerah Srivastav	June 2, 2023	T30.10417
Eight months after the isolation protocol, Angelina's group have taken refuge in the Stones' empty house. A pregnant Drea begins work on digging a hole into the facility. A Calling about flowers on a building leads Cal and Jared to the house where Jared finds a photo of Autumn and a building that has flowers on it. In the detention facility, rations begin going slim and a tremor leads to a loss of power. Olive suggests that they should make a banner for any 828 sympathizers to come to their aid. Vance and Michaela trace the building in Autumn's photo to the one owned by Drea. Arriving at the building, Jared manages to break through the wall into the Detention Center, enabling Cal to reunite with Ben. Then, Drea and Jared work to provide power to the building. Michaela and Vance arrive with Steve who wanted to see Ben, who tells the 828 passengers that Cal has grown up and that they must work together. Astrid leaves Angelina and arrives at Drea's building. When Cal visits Marko, Marko briefly grabs his arm, and Cal gets a vision of a peacock with two sapphires coming together, suggesting that he and Angelina need to join forces.
60	18	"Lift/Drag"	Melissa Roxburgh	Ezra W. Nachman & Ryan Martinez	June 2, 2023	T30.10418
On May 31, 2024, Saanvi and Troy analyze growing fissures in a facility run by Dr. Gupta, which she considers an extinction-level event. Troy comes up with a plan to block the ultra low frequency created by the volcano using an electromagnetic pulse. Cal goes through different Callings and makes out each one to the different passengers. Michaela's Calling leads her to the rehab facility where Zeke worked where she reunites with Carlos. After a session with him, Michaela writes a forgiveness letter to Evie, ties it to a balloon, and lets it ascend while forgiving herself. Ben's calling of a partial zip code, leads him, Cal, and Vance to Dr. Gupta's facility. Due to Saanvi and Troy's EMP, Ben, Cal, and Vance enter without setting off the security systems. Saanvi reunites with Ben, Cal, and Vance, and escapes with some flash drives while Troy allows himself to be caught by the security guards, buying them time. Eagan proposes to Angelina. After their wedding, however, Adrian shows up. Upon finding no more Callings in the Divine Consciousness, Cal informs Ben of this and is later visited by Henry who gives him a miniature wooden figurine of Shenlong. Thanks to a miniature EMP, Marko and the other ALNI patients wake up.
61	19	"Formation"	Claudia Yarmy	Simran Baidwan & Margaret Easley	June 2, 2023	T30.10419
The passengers learn that when Marko woke up, he muttered the word "Kovcheg" which means coffin, hinting that they were all going to die. Cal goes into the Divine Consciousness to try to reason with Angelina but to no avail. Michaela shows a depressed Cal a Gemini sketch Carlos gave her. At the same time, Olive returns the wooden Shenlong dragon figurine. These along with a peacock drawing of Cal's Calling were the three symbols that brought the Death Date. After Ben learns "Kovcheg" also means Ark, everyone realizes that they can use the sapphire that was found in the fragment of Noah's Ark that Saanvi threw into the fissure on Storm King Mountain, leading the group on a trip there. Adrian reveals to Eagan that he has gone around apologizing for what has befallen the 828 passengers and their loved ones. Eagan later talks to Adrian about Saanvi mentioning about the sapphire that was found in the fragment of Noah's Ark. Eagan declares his annulment from Angelina and leaves with Adrian. While waiting for their next move, Michaela and Jared agree that Drea is the one for Jared. Later that night, Ben wakes up to find Cal near the fissure, claiming that it's time for him to go. Cal thanks his father for being his father as he disappears into the light. This causes a beacon to emerge that is seen by all of the 828 passengers.
62	20	"Final Boarding"	Romeo Tirone	Laura Putney & Jeff Rake	June 2, 2023	T30.10420
On the night of the Death Date, the passengers have gathered around the fissure as Flight 828 emerges and everyone boards the plane. Angelina and her flock try to force the others to leave, but her powers fail her and Angelina falls. Following a clue in the Al-Zuras journal, Olive realizes that in order to survive the Death Date, Ben needs to lighten his heart by forgiving Angelina for Grace's murder. After Angelina expresses remorse for killing Grace, Ben saves her life and flight 828 takes off as an apocalyptic volcanic eruption begins. The passengers undergo judgement, with 11 passengers, including Angelina, turning to ash for their evil deeds. Eagan's selfless attempt to save Adrian allows them both to survive while Saanvi narrowly escapes burning up because her saving Cal's life balanced her killing the Major. A shadowy figure judges the good deeds of the passengers to be enough to tip the scales and stops the eruption. Flying into the glow, flight 828 is sent back in time to April 7, 2013, the day the plane disappeared. The passengers reunite with their loved ones, overjoyed to return to the lives and families they left behind, including Ben & Grace and Saanvi & Alex. All of the passengers lost along the way are resurrected, including Cal, who is restored to his childhood with no memory of the past five and a half years. Michaela rejects Jared's proposal, telling him there is someone better for him. She then decides to pursue a new relationship with Zeke who is working as an airport taxi driver. Ben promises to introduce Grace to Saanvi, saying she is the one who can cure Cal's leukemia. Jared meets Drea when she arrives with Vance to investigate the disappearance of the 11 passengers. The series ends with Michaela and Zeke driving off as Michaela narrates that regardless of what happened on the flight, it changed everything forever.

== Ratings ==
=== Season 1 ===
The premiere episode was both the top-rated new show for the broadcast season and the top-rated show airing that week.

Viewership and ratings per episode of List of Manifest episodes
No.	Title	Air date	Rating/share (18–49)	Viewers (millions)	DVR (18–49)	DVR viewers (millions)	Total (18–49)	Total viewers (millions)
1	"Pilot"	September 24, 2018	2.2/9	10.40	2.0	7.99	4.2	18.40
2	"Reentry"	October 1, 2018	1.8/8	8.45	1.8	7.51	3.6	15.96
3	"Turbulence"	October 8, 2018	1.6/7	7.45	1.8	7.38	3.4	14.85
4	"Unclaimed Baggage"	October 15, 2018	1.5/7	7.46	1.7	6.88	3.2	14.35
5	"Connecting Flights"	October 22, 2018	1.4/6	7.29	1.6	6.34	3.0	13.63
6	"Off Radar"	November 5, 2018	1.2/5	6.28	1.8	6.97	3.1	13.24
7	"S.N.A.F.U."	November 12, 2018	1.1/5	6.10	1.6	5.81	2.7	11.91
8	"Point of No Return"	November 19, 2018	1.1/5	5.56	1.5	5.95	2.6	11.52
9	"Dead Reckoning"	November 26, 2018	1.1/5	5.97	1.3	5.47	2.4	11.44
10	"Crosswinds"	January 7, 2019	1.1/5	5.84	1.5	5.74	2.6	11.58
11	"Contrails"	January 14, 2019	0.9/5	5.46	1.5	5.54	2.4	11.00
12	"Vanishing Point"	January 21, 2019	1.0/5	5.37	1.3	5.37	2.3	10.74
13	"Cleared for Approach"	January 28, 2019	1.0/5	5.54	1.4	5.47	2.4	11.01
14	"Upgrade"	February 4, 2019	0.9/4	5.26	1.3	5.36	2.2	10.56
15	"Hard Landing"	February 11, 2019	1.1/5	6.00	1.2	5.13	2.3	11.13
16	"Estimated Time of Departure"	February 18, 2019	1.0/5	5.36	1.2	4.98	2.2	10.34

=== Season 2 ===
Viewership and ratings per episode of List of Manifest episodes
No.	Title	Air date	Rating/share (18–49)	Viewers (millions)	DVR (18–49)	DVR viewers (millions)	Total (18–49)	Total viewers (millions)
1	"Fasten Your Seatbelts"	January 6, 2020	0.9/5	4.73	0.9	4.28	1.8	9.02
2	"Grounded"	January 13, 2020	0.7/3	3.49	0.9	4.14	1.6	7.64
3	"False Horizon"	January 20, 2020	0.7/4	3.64	0.9	4.15	1.6	7.79
4	"Black Box"	January 27, 2020	0.6/4	3.72	0.9	3.91	1.5	7.63
5	"Coordinated Flight"	February 3, 2020	0.7	3.55	0.9	4.05	1.6	7.60
6	"Return Trip"	February 10, 2020	0.6	3.70	0.8	3.87	1.4	7.57
7	"Emergency Exit"	February 17, 2020	0.6	3.70	0.8	3.75	1.4	7.45
8	"Carry On"	March 2, 2020	0.7	3.64	0.8	3.73	1.5	7.37
9	"Airplane Bottles"	March 9, 2020	0.6	3.67	0.7	3.47	1.3	7.14
10	"Course Deviation"	March 16, 2020	0.8	4.29	0.7	3.43	1.5	7.72
11	"Unaccompanied Minors"	March 23, 2020	0.7	4.12	0.8	3.62	1.5	7.75
12	"Call Sign"	March 30, 2020	0.7	4.08	0.9	3.75	1.6	7.83
13	"Icing Conditions"	April 6, 2020	0.7	4.36	0.7	3.20	1.4	7.56

=== Season 3 ===
Viewership and ratings per episode of List of Manifest episodes
No.	Title	Air date	Rating (18–49)	Viewers (millions)	DVR (18–49)	DVR viewers (millions)	Total (18–49)	Total viewers (millions)
1	"Tailfin"	April 1, 2021	0.7	3.99	—N/a	—N/a	—N/a	—N/a
2	"Deadhead"	April 8, 2021	0.5	3.15	0.5	2.26	1.0	5.41
3	"Wingman"	April 15, 2021	0.5	3.32	—N/a	—N/a	—N/a	—N/a
4	"Tailspin"	April 22, 2021	0.5	3.21	0.4	2.38	0.9	5.59
5	"Water Landing"	April 29, 2021	0.5	3.27	0.4	1.87	0.9	5.14
6	"Graveyard Spiral"	April 29, 2021	0.5	3.21	0.4	1.98	0.9	5.19
7	"Precious Cargo"	May 6, 2021	0.5	3.05	0.4	1.89	0.9	4.93
8	"Destination Unknown"	May 6, 2021	0.5	2.85	0.4	2.09	0.9	4.93
9	"Bogey"	May 13, 2021	0.4	2.95	0.4	1.89	0.8	4.83
10	"Compass Calibration"	May 20, 2021	0.4	2.85	0.4	1.97	0.9	4.82
11	"Duty Free"	June 3, 2021	0.4	2.78	0.4	1.97	0.8	4.75
12–13	"Mayday, Part 1" / "Mayday, Part 2"	June 10, 2021	0.4	2.76	0.4	1.85	0.8	4.62

Manifest : U.S. viewers per episode (millions)
Audience measurement performed by Nielsen Media Research
