= High Flight =

1941 poem by John Gillespie Magee Jr

- by John Gillespie Magee Jr.
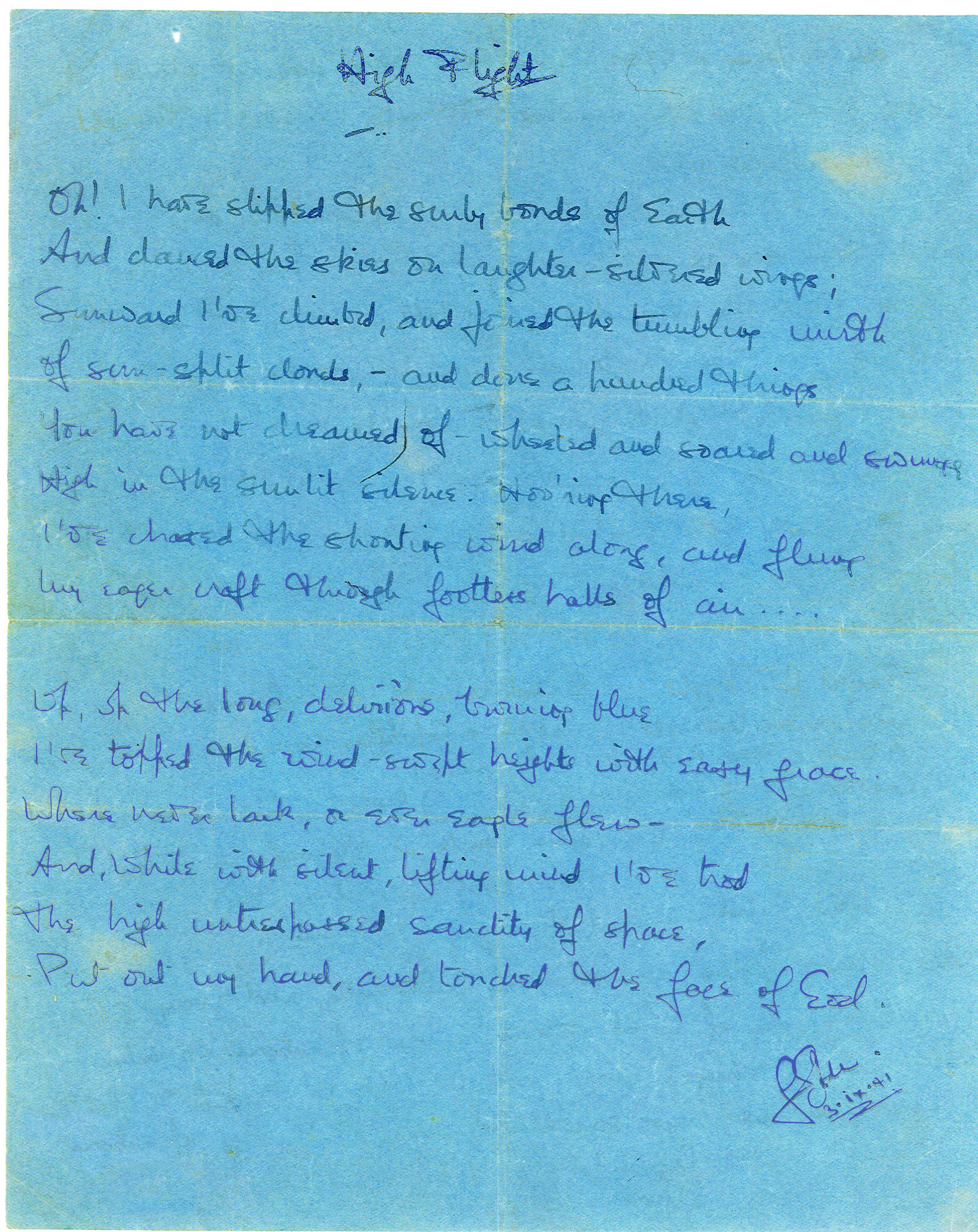
- Magee's manuscript of "High Flight", mailed to his parents on 3 September 1941.
- Written: August 1941 (85 years ago)
- Language: English
- Subject: Aviation
- Form: Sonnet
- Meter: Iambic pentameter
- Media type: Handwritten
- Lines: 14

Full text
- High Flight at Wikisource

Reading of the poem "High Flight"

High Flight is a 1941 sonnet written by war poet John Gillespie Magee Jr. and inspired by his experiences as a fighter pilot of the Royal Canadian Air Force in World War II. Magee began writing the poem on 18 August, while stationed at No. 53 OTU outside London, and mailed a completed manuscript to his family on 3 September, three months before he died in a training accident. Originally published in the Pittsburgh Post-Gazette, it was widely distributed when Magee became one of the first post-Pearl Harbor American casualties of the war on 11 December, after which it was exhibited at the American Library of Congress in 1942. Owing to its gleeful and ethereal portrayal of aviation, along with its allegorical interpretation of death and transcendence, the poem has been featured prominently in aviation memorials across the world, including that of the Space Shuttle Challenger disaster.

High Flight

"Oh! I have slipped the surly bonds of Earth
And danced the skies on laughter-silvered wings;
Sunward I’ve climbed, and joined the tumbling mirth
of sun-split clouds, — and done a hundred things
You have not dreamed of – wheeled and soared and swung
High in the sunlit silence. Hov’ring there,
I’ve chased the shouting wind along, and flung
My eager craft through footless halls of air....

Up, up the long, delirious, burning blue
I’ve topped the wind-swept heights with easy grace.
Where never lark, or even eagle flew —
And, while with silent, lifting mind I've trod
The high untrespassed sanctity of space,
– Put out my hand, and touched the face of God."

== Creation ==
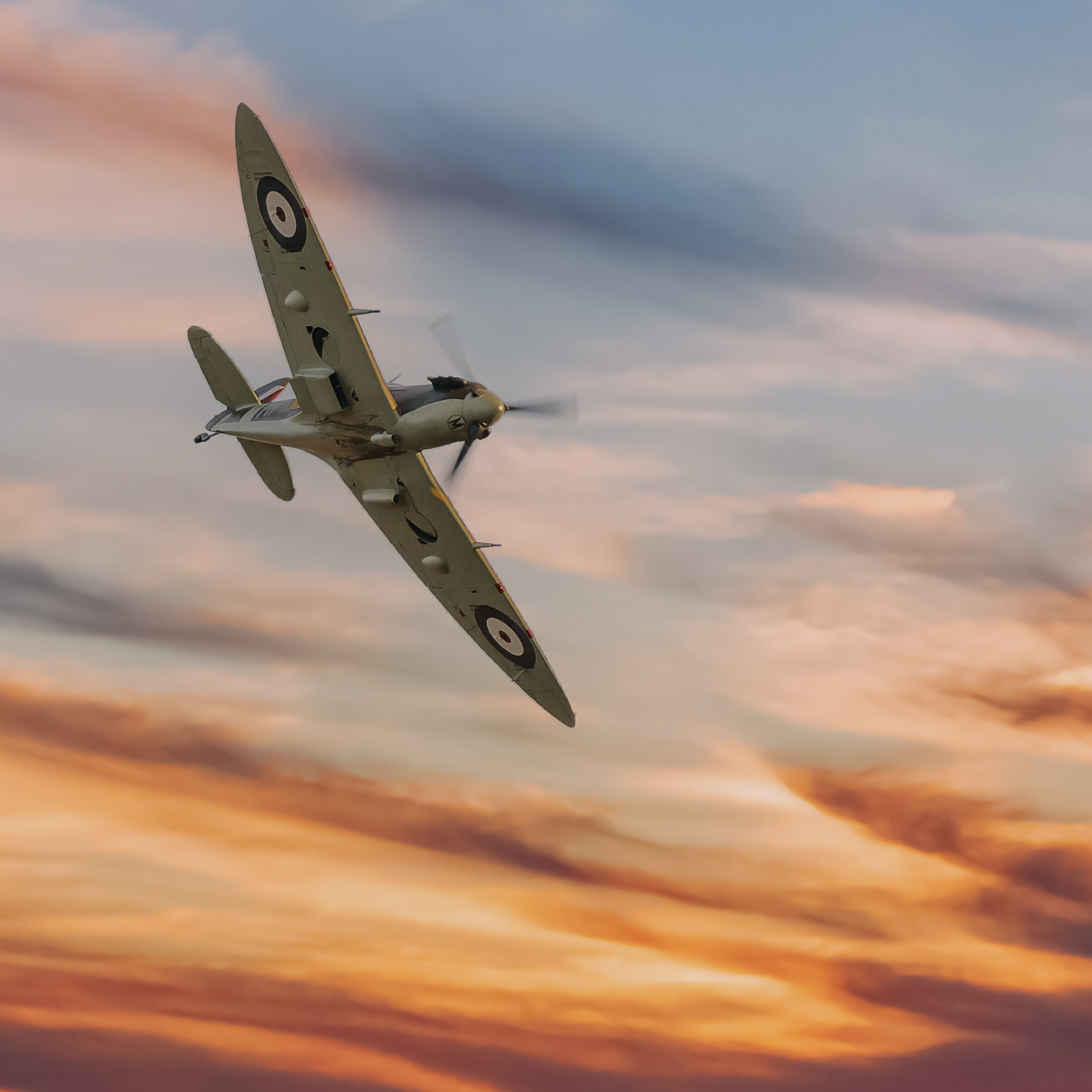
Supermarine Spitfire like the one flown by John Magee

While piloting a Spitfire Mk I, Magee reached 33,000 feet (10,000 m) during a training flight over Wales sometime in August 1941. He was impressed by the speed and agility of the aircraft, and moved by the experience of flying at that altitude. He wrote to his parents that he completed the poem soon after finishing training that day.

The first person to read Magee's poem later that same day in the officers' mess was fellow Pilot Officer Michael Henry Le Bas (later Air Vice-Marshal M. H. Le Bas, Air Officer Commanding No. 1 Group RAF), with whom Magee had trained.

Magee enclosed the poem in a letter to his parents, dated 3 September 1941. His father, then curate of Saint John's Episcopal Church in Washington, DC, reprinted it in church publications. The poem became more widely known through the efforts of Archibald MacLeish, then Librarian of Congress, who included it in an exhibition of poems called "Faith and Freedom" at the Library of Congress in February 1942. The manuscript copy of the poem remains at the Library of Congress.

=== Inspirational sources ===
Dr. Oliver Tearle writes that Magee could have been inspired by romantic poems that imagined the sensation of flying before humans first successfully flew. The poet described his flight as supernatural, surrealistic and limitless, while it concerns an actual flight in an actual flying machine. Tearle stated that the poem could be seen as a symbol of technological progress, as its author had transcended the confinements of nature in real life: the aeroplane has allowed humankind to defy the limit of being bound to Earth, soar higher than any bird, and "become almost a god himself." High Flight could have been further influenced by the effects of hypoxia, which Magee described experiencing on one of his flights in his logbook, and perhaps an aviation-specific type of spatial disorientation that makes pilots feel dissociated with their aircraft's controls.

The last words of High Flight — "...and touched the face of God" — can also be found in a poem by Cuthbert Hicks published three years earlier in Icarus: An Anthology of the Poetry of Flight. The last two lines in Hicks' poem The Blind Man Flies read:

For I have danced the streets of heaven,
And touched the face of God.

The anthology includes the poem "New World" by G. W. M. Dunn, which contains the phrase "on laughter-silvered wings". Dunn wrote of "the lifting mind", another phrase that Magee used in High Flight, and refers to "the shouting of the air", in comparison to Magee's line, "chased the shouting wind." Another line by Magee, "The high untrespassed sanctity of space", closely resembles "Across the unpierced sanctity of space", which appears in the anthology in the poem "Dominion over Air" (previously published in the RAF College Journal).

== Uses of the poem ==
U.S. President Ronald Reagan addresses the nation after the Challenger disaster (28 January 1986)

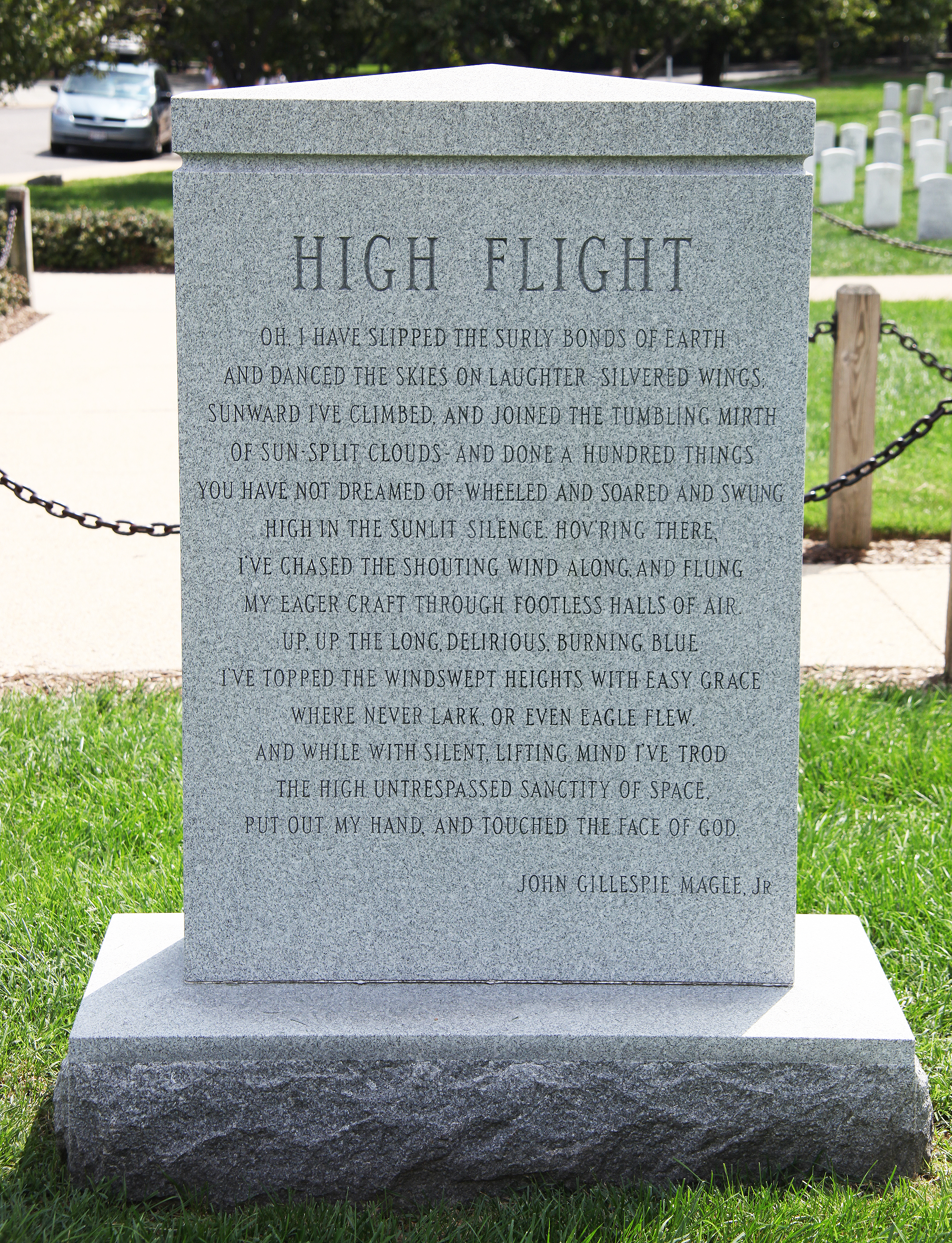
"High Flight" is inscribed in full on the back of the Space Shuttle Challenger Memorial at Arlington National Cemetery.

During April and May 1942, many Hollywood stars including Laurel and Hardy, Groucho Marx, Cary Grant, Bing Crosby, and Bob Hope joined the Hollywood Victory Caravan as it toured the United States on a mission to raise war bonds. Actress Merle Oberon recited High Flight as part of this show. During the performance on 30 April 1942, at the Loew's Capitol Theatre in Washington, D.C., and before her recitation of High Flight, Oberon acknowledged the attendance of Magee's father, John Magee, and brother Christopher Magee.

Orson Welles read the poem on an episode of Radio Reader's Digest (11 October 1942), Command Performance (21 December 1943), and The Orson Welles Almanac (31 May 1944).

High Flight has been a favourite poem amongst both aviators and astronauts. It is the official poem of the Royal Canadian Air Force and the Royal Air Force. The poem has to be recited from memory by fourth-class cadets at the United States Air Force Academy, where it can be seen on display in the Cadet Field House. At the United States Air Force Academy Cemetery, the grave marker of Brigadier General Robin Olds is inscribed with a variant of a line from the poem: "dancing the skies on laughter silvered wings".

The poem is often read at funerals of aviators; portions of the poem appear on many of the headstones in the Arlington National Cemetery, and it is inscribed in full on the back of the Space Shuttle Challenger Memorial. It is displayed on panels at the Canadian War Museum in Ottawa, the National Air Force Museum of Canada, in Trenton, Ontario. It is the subject of a permanent display at the National Museum of the United States Air Force, in Dayton, Ohio.

Brigadier General Robert Lee Scott Jr. included the poem in his 1943 book God is My Co-Pilot.

Astronaut Michael Collins brought an index card with the poem typed on it on his Gemini 10 flight and included the poem in his 1974 autobiography Carrying the Fire. Former NASA Flight Director Gene Kranz quoted the first line of the poem in his book Failure Is Not An Option. U.S. President Ronald Reagan used part of "High Flight" in a speech written by Peggy Noonan on the night after the Challenger disaster on 28 January 1986.

At RAF Scampton in Lincolnshire, a memorial to Red Arrows pilots, Flight Lieutenants Jon Egging, killed on 20 August 2011, and Sean Cunningham, killed on 8 November 2011, bears an interpretation of the poem on a brass plaque atop a wooden plinth in front of a gate guardian aircraft outside the RAF Aerobatics Team hangar. The plaque reads "...they have slipped the surly bonds of Earth / Put out their hands and touched the face of God... / In memory of / Flt Lt Jon Egging – 20th August 2011 / Flt Lt Sean Cunningham – 8th November 2011".

In her 1 September 2018, eulogy for her father, John McCain, Meghan McCain quoted the poem at the end of her tribute. "I know that on the afternoon of August 25th in front of Oak Creek in Cornville, Arizona, surrounded by the family he loved so much, an old man shook off the scars of battle one last time and arose a new man to pilot one last flight up and up and up, busting clouds left and right, straight on through to the kingdom of heaven. And he slipped the earthly bonds, put out his hand, and touched the face of God"

=== Musical adaptations ===
Miklós Rózsa composed the earliest known setting of High Flight, for tenor voice, in 1942. It was later published as one of his Five Songs in 1974. Canadian composer and Royal Canadian Air Force veteran Robert J. B. Fleming wrote a through-composed musical setting of the poem for the Divine Services Book of the Canadian Armed Forces published in 1950. The composer Bill Pursell wrote his own arrangement with narration for the United States Air Force Band, which was broadcast on their radio show in the late 1940s. Several songs and symphonic compositions have been based on Magee's text, including Bob Chilcott's 2008 setting, premiered on 1 May 2008 by the King's Singers.

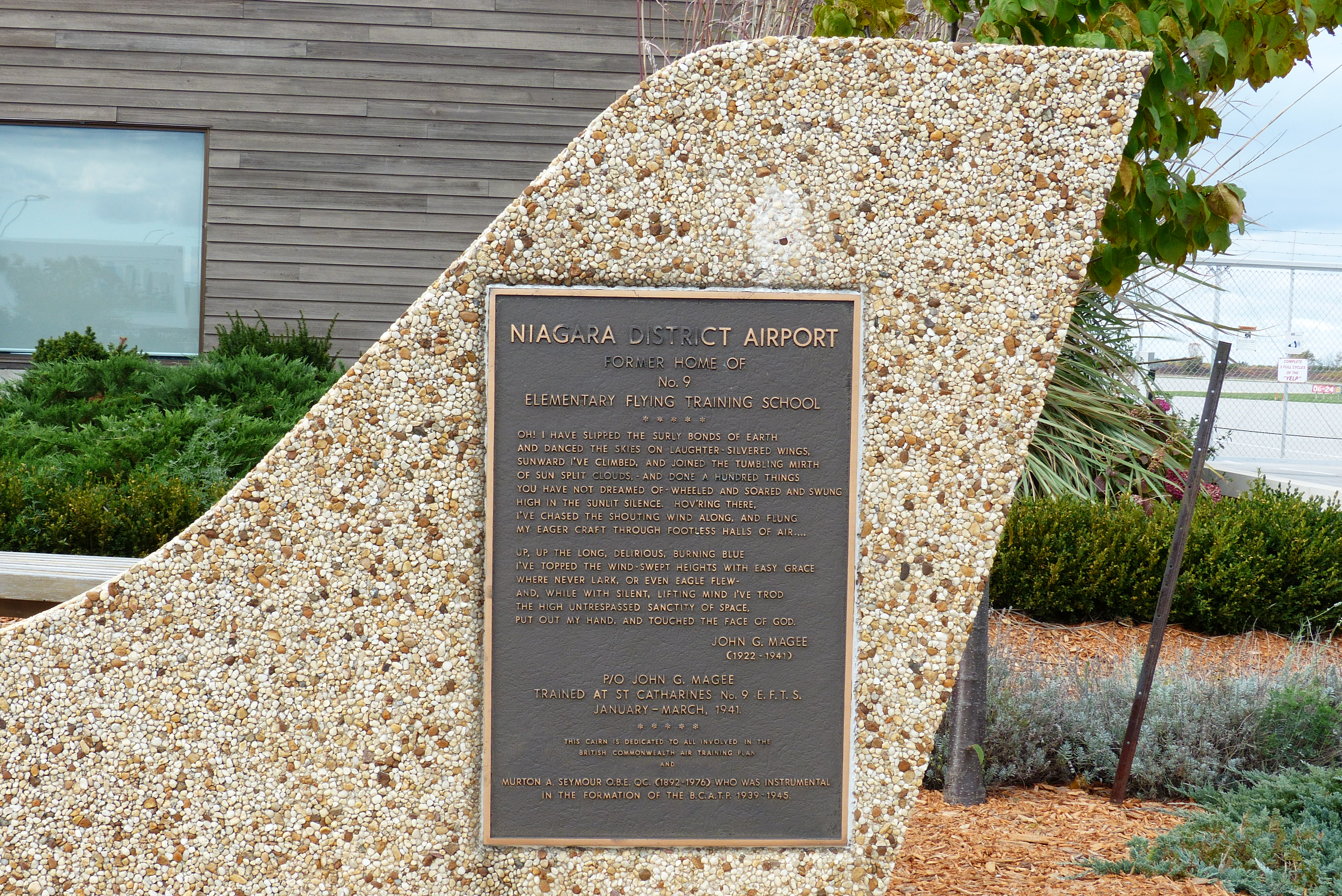
A plaque at St. Catharines/Niagara District Airport commemorates J G. Magee Jr.

The poem has been set to music by several composers, including by John Denver and Lee Holdridge as performed on the Bob Hope television show and is included in his 1983 album It's About Time and by Christopher Marshall, whose composition was commissioned for and premiered by The Orlando Chorale with saxophonist George Weremchuk (Orlando, Florida) in March 2009, under the direction of Gregory Ruffer. The first performance of a setting of words, known as "Even Such Is Time", from Fauré’s Requiem, plus additional non-liturgical texts that included "High Flight", was performed by the Nantwich Choral Society, conducted by John Naylor, on Saturday 26 March 2011, in St Mary's Church, Nantwich, Cheshire. The music was written by Andrew Mildinhall, the former organist at the church, who accompanied the performance with the Northern Concordia Orchestra.

Singer Al Jarreau paid brief homage to "High Flight" by using the closing lines in the bridge of his 1983 song "Mornin'".

The American composer James Curnow was commissioned by the Graduates Association of Tenri High School Band in Nara, Japan to write a piece for concert band in honour of the 50th anniversary of its association. The piece is entitled Where Never Lark or Eagle Flew with the subtitle "Based on a poem by John Gillespie Magee Jr." In 2012, the Australian composer Daniel Walker was commissioned by North Sydney Boys High School to compose a piece for the school's centenary celebrations. This composition, 'Through Footless Halls of Air', which was written for choir and symphonic winds, features the poem in the lyrics.

British composer Jonathan Dove included the poem in his 2009 oratorio There Was a Child, written as a memoriam to Robert Van Allen, who also died at the age of nineteen. It has also been set by British composer Nicholas Scott Burt as a short motet and dedicated to the choir of Rugby Parish Church.

In 2011, Emmylou Harris wrote and recorded a song, "Darlin' Kate", dedicated to her late friend, folk singer-songwriter Kate McGarrigle, which included the lines, " As you slip the surly bonds of earth and sail away..."

In 2014, Canadian composer Vince Gassi composed a piece for concert band entitled Chase The Shouting Wind.

In 2015, the Hardcore DJ Nosferatu used the poem in his track "sanctity of space".

=== Depictions in mass media ===
Many U.S. television viewers were introduced to "High Flight" when several TV stations ended (and sometimes also began) their programming day with various short films containing it. The sign-off film occasionally seen on KPTV in Portland, Oregon and KCRA in Sacramento, California featured the spoken poem played to Air Force flying footage. Other examples of the use of the poem in television programs, films include:

- The popular comic strip Bloom County, which used the poem on 8 July 1984, to illuminate the Earth-bound frustrations of Opus, a flightless waterfowl.
- Featured in an episode of NBC's The Blacklist season 3 episode 6 "Sir Crispin Crandall" originally aired 5 November 2015
- Featured in an episode of AMC's Mad Men season 2 episode 6 "Maidenform" originally aired 31 August 2008, where the poem is read on television during a scene featuring Pete Campbell.
- An episode of the UK archaeology documentary series Time Team that featured the excavation of a crashed Spitfire in France, when the poem was read during the end credits.
- The penultimate episode "Daybreak" of Battlestar Galactica, where the poem is paraphrased.
- The first and last lines quoted by President Ronald Reagan after the Space Shuttle Challenger disaster in January 1986.
  - The 1990 made-for-television film, Challenger, that documented the events leading up to the Challenger disaster concludes with the seven doomed astronauts reciting the poem in their thoughts as the shuttle is about to launch.
- The 1993 Mel Gibson movie The Man Without a Face, where the poem is recited by the character Chuck Norstadt, played by Nick Stahl.
- The 1993 Russell Crowe movie For the Moment, where the poem is recited by Crowe's character, Lachlan Curry.
- In 1995, the Season 7 Simpsons episode "Sideshow Bob's Last Gleaming" features the first and last line of the poem, spoken by R. Lee Ermey as Col. Leslie "Hap" Hapablap.
- The 1989 science fiction adventure film Slipstream, which made frequent use of the poem, most notably by Mark Hamill and Bob Peck.
- The film Snow Walker, in which James Cromwell recites the poem.
- Pilot and composer Max Conrad's second LP of Flight Inspired Music, which features the poem on the cover.
- Scott O'Grady's book Return With Honor, which has a full transcript of the poem.
- One Small Step, a children's novel by Philip Kerr, reprints the poem in full before the Author's Note.
- A reporter in the film First Man is heard quoting the poem ('slipped the surly bonds of Earth') while describing the Gemini 8 mission that Neil Armstrong took part in.
- President Bartlet recites the final portion of the poem ("...with outstretched fingers, we touched the face of God") in "The Crackpots and These Women", the fifth episode from Season 1 of The West Wing.
- A French translation of "High Flight" is told by Bernard Chabert in an episode of Pégase, a French TV documentary dedicated to the Spitfire.
- English independent filmmakers James Walker and John Wallace produced the documentary film High Flight in 2016, which takes its name from the poem, and documents Magee's story, the origin of the poem and the poem's place in the legacy of World War Two iconography, as well as the cultural impact of the era upon the "baby boomer" generation. The film is due for release and distribution in late 2016.
- In the 2017 movie Life, Ariyon Bakare's character Hugh recites the poem.
- In 2019, it was referenced during a speech of the opening episode of the sixth season of the TV series Madam Secretary.
- In 2022, the third episode of the fourth season of the Netflix series Manifest was titled "High Flight", within which the phrase "long, delirious, burning blue" played a pivotal role.
