= Pilot (Manifest) =

- Manifest episode
- Episode no.: Season 1 Episode 1
- Directed by: David Frankel
- Written by: Jeff Rake
- Original air date: September 24, 2018
- Running time: 45 minutes

Guest appearances
- Joel de la Fuente as Dr. Brian Cardoso; Frank Deal as Capt. Bill Daly; Curtiss Cook as Radd; Rich Topol as Harvey; Julienne Hanzelka Kim as Kelley

Episode chronology
← Previous —	Next → "Reentry"

"Pilot" is the pilot and first episode of the American television series Manifest, first aired on NBC on September 24, 2018. It involves a flight from Jamaica to New York City which experiences a brief period of severe turbulence, but lands safely to find that five years have passed while the plane was in the air. The episode was written by series creator Jeff Rake, and directed by David Frankel. It was initially seen by 10.40 million viewers.

== Plot ==
Michaela Stone, a NYPD officer, waits for a plane back to New York from Jamaica after a family vacation with her parents, her brother Ben, Ben's wife Grace, and Ben's twin children Olive and Cal. Their flight is overbooked, so some passengers are offered money to wait for another flight. Michaela, Ben, and Cal choose to take the later flight, Montego Air Flight 828. After their plane experiences a brief period of severe turbulence, it is forced to land. When they disembark, the passengers and crew learn that five and a half years have passed since their flight left Jamaica, with all on board presumed missing or dead. Thirty-six hours later, all on board are let go by the FBI. Michaela learns that her mother fell ill and died during their time away, and that Michaela's fiancé Jared—another police officer who is currently investigating the abduction of two girls—has married her best friend.

Cal's leukemia has not progressed due to the time jump, and his parents learn of a new treatment which was discovered by Saanvi, a medical researcher who was also on Flight 828. Her work has helped hundreds of pediatric cancer patients in her absence, and Ben and Grace apply for the treatment. Although her boss believes Cal should not be accepted for the study, Saanvi is adamant he be chosen.

Michaela begins to hear a voice in her head, which she attempts to ignore. While on a bus, she hears a voice that says "slow down". She yells at the bus driver to slow down, which he does in enough time to stop the bus from hitting a young boy who ran out into the street. Later, Michaela hears a voice say "set them free" while passing by two dogs at a metalworking facility. She goes back at night to free the dogs with the help of Ben, who also heard the voice; however, they are caught on camera. When the dogs are found, Jared brings Michaela to the facility to return them. She hears the same voice, eventually finding the two abducted girls. Jared apprehends the owner of the facility.

Later, twenty-one passengers hear a voice calling them to the plane. When they arrive, the plane explodes.

== Production ==
=== Development ===
On August 23, 2017, it was announced that NBC had given Manifest a put pilot commitment, to be written by Jeff Rake and produced by Rake, Robert Zemeckis, Jack Rapke, and Jackie Levine. On January 23, 2018, it was reported that NBC had given the production a formal pilot order. The pilot was directed by David Frankel, who also executive produced. Manifest was ordered to series in May 2018.

=== Casting ===
In February 2018, Josh Dallas, Melissa Roxburgh and J. R. Ramirez were cast as series regulars. In March 2018, Athena Karkanis, Parveen Kaur and Luna Blaise joined the main cast as well.

== Broadcast and reception ==
A premiere date of September 24, 2018, was announced in June 2018.

=== Ratings ===
The episode was seen by 10.40 million viewers, and received a 2.2/9 rating/share.

=== Critical response ===
Verne Gay of Newsday praised the cast, and noted that "Manifest wants to be This Is Us with a taste of Lost." Lorraine Ali of the Los Angeles Times wrote that the pilot "initially captivates with Lost-like puzzles ... But once on the ground, rote themes of redemption and faith dilute an otherwise intriguing supernatural occurrence". Matthew Gilbert of The Boston Globe called the episode "soapy", but praised the setup of the primary mystery.
