= James Patterson McBaine =

American law professor (1882–1961)

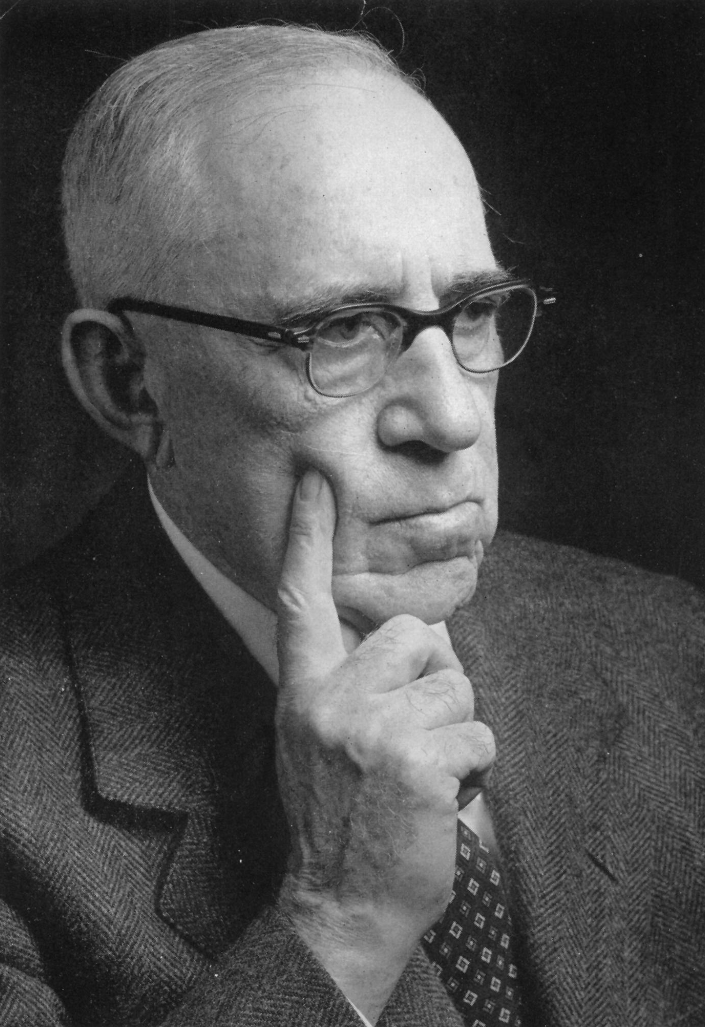
- McBaine in 1952
- Born: July 18, 1882; Kansas City, Missouri
- Died: March 2, 1961 (aged 78); Berkeley, California
- Children: 2

Academic background
- Education: University of Missouri School of Law and Columbia University School of Law (LL.B.)

James Patterson McBaine (July 18, 1882 – March 2, 1961) was an American law professor who taught at the University of California College of the Law, San Francisco and UC Berkeley School of Law as the A. F. and May T. Morrison Professor of Municipal Law. From 1919 to 1927, McBaine served as dean of the University of Missouri School of Law.

== Early life ==
On July 18, 1882, James Patterson McBaine was born to Scottish parents in Kansas City, Missouri. After living in Maryland and Kentucky, McBaine's great-grandfather settled in Missouri. McBaine's father was a farmer and banker who also attended the University of Missouri.

McBaine earned his Bachelor of Laws degree in 1904, studying between the University of Missouri School of Law and Columbia Law School. At Columbia, McBaine became friends with then-Associate Professor Harlan F. Stone, who later had McBaine teach three summer sessions at Columbia Law School.

From 1904 to 1909, McBaine worked at the private law firm McKeighan and Watts in St. Louis. After coming to Columbia, Missouri, to administer his father's estate in 1909, he remained there until 1919, teaching at the University of Missouri School of Law part-time while running his own law firm, McBaine and Clark.

== Career ==
From 1919 to 1927, McBaine served as dean of the University of Missouri School of Law, while continuing as counsel for appellate practice in his law firm. From 1920 to 1925, he served as Chairman of the Uniform Law Commission. In 1926, he was elected to a one-year term as President of the Missouri Bar Association.

While dean, McBaine also served as Special Commissioner of the Supreme Court of Missouri, making findings of fact and recommending judgements in the court's cases of original jurisdiction. Whenever the state's high court was evenly split, McBaine would act as a Special Judge to break judicial ties.

After finishing a one-year professorship at the UC Berkeley School of Law, McBaine was appointed to the faculty in 1928. He continued in an endowed professorship until his 1952 retirement. During his tenure, McBaine was well known for his books, including Cases on Trial Practice, and thirteen articles published in the California Law Review. As a member of the University of California's Committees on Privilege and Tenure, Memorial Resolutions, and Honorary Degrees and Council of the Graduate Division for eleven years, including as Acting Dean of the Graduate Division from 1944 to 1945, McBaine became well-liked among faculty.

== Recognition ==
In 1952, California Supreme Court Chief Justice Roger J. Traynor offered significant praise for McBaine upon his retirement, and in 1960, the UC Berkeley School of Law awarded him a Doctor of Law degree. The UC Berkeley School of Law's annual moot court competition is called the McBaine Honors Moot Court in his memory.

== Personal life ==
In his later life, McBaine maintained a routine of walking the mile between his home and the UC Berkeley Law campus (then known as Boalt Hall), spending three hours on legal research and writing, eating lunch with faculty, and then returning home by foot. On March 2, 1961, McBaine died at the age of 78 with his funeral held two days later at the Berkeley Hills Chapel.

On December 27, 1906, McBaine married Ethel Hudson in the Calvary Episcopal Church of Columbia, Missouri. Together, they had two children: Turner H. McBaine and Anne McBaine.

In February 1964, McBaine's grandson, John Neylan McBaine, married Alison Byrd Denny, the daughter of Federal Communications Commission Chairman Charles R. Denny.
