= Margaret Easley =

American actress and television writer

- Born: Margaret-Erin Easley
- Education: Santa Barbara High School; Santa Barbara City College (A.A.); University of California, Santa Barbara (B.A.)
- Occupations: Actress, voice actress, television writer, television producer
- Years active: 1997–present

Margaret-Erin Easley is an American actress and television writer and producer.

== Early life ==
One of three children born to career U.S. Army officer, Col. Michael Frederick Easley, and former TV news anchor—and, later, talk show host/media consultant—Joanne T. Desmond, Easley attended Santa Barbara High School, and received an Associate of Arts degree from Santa Barbara City College and a Bachelor of Arts in English from the University of California, Santa Barbara.

== Career ==
She has worked in the theater, television and films and voice-overs and commercials. She has done commercials for Home Depot, McDonald's and DirecWay. She is alum of The Groundlings.

She also works as a screenwriter and television producer, contributing to The Mysteries of Laura, Life Sentence and Manifest.

== Filmography ==
=== Acting ===
- Assassin's Creed Valhalla (2020) (Videogame) — Gunlod
- The Listing Agent (2014) (Short film) — Wendy Brown
- Infamous Second Son (2014) (Videogame) — Female pedestrian
- Modern Family ("The Wow Factor", 2013) — Rachel
- The Thundermans (2013) - Fiona Campbell
- Assassin's Creed III (2012) (Videogame) — Minerva
- Starhawk (2012) (Videogame) — Automated Voice, Crowd
- iCarly (2011) — Mrs. Dershlit
- The Closer (2010) — Joan Marku
- Assassin's Creed II (2009) (Videogame) — Minerva
- Marvel: Ultimate Alliance 2 (2009) (Videogame) — Maria Hill
- 90210 (2009) — Sister Mary Elisabeth
- Me, You, a Bag & Bamboo (2009) (Short film) — Clifford's Mother
- Sizzle: A Global Warming Comedy (2008) — Janet Sanders
- Ghost Whisperer (2008) — Brenda
- Lost: Via Domus (2008) (Videogame) — Juliet Burke
- Moonlight (2008) — Dr Alison Lin
- Dan's Detour of Life (2008) (TV movie) — Caroline Kirkland
- Neverwinter Nights 2: Mask of the Betrayer (2007) (Videogame) — Katya, Kazimika Vadoi, NPC Female Merchant
- NCIS (2007) — Sara Nelson
- Big Love (2006–2010) — April Blessing
- Driver '76 (2007) (Videogame) — Mrs Thompson
- Andy Barker, P.I. (2007) — Wendy Halverson
- The Singles Table (2007) — Makeup Artist
- Family Guy (2005–2006) — Various, Hand #2 (voices)
- Neverwinter Nights 2 (2006) (Videogame) — Katya, Kazimika Vadoi
- Cold Case (2006) — Stella Bobker
- Studio 60 on the Sunset Strip (2006) — Constance Gower
- Pepper Dennis (2006) — Alice
- The King of Queens (2006) — Nancy
- The Night of the Falcon (2005) (Short film) — Margaret
- Mrs. Harris (2005) (TV movie) — Carol Potts
- Alias (2005) — Tammy Miller/Yelena Vasya
- Peep Show (2005) (TV movie) — Erin
- Huff (2004) — Sheila Connelly
- Without a Trace (2004) — Sonya Trammel
- Six Feet Under (2004) — Young Woman in Elevator
- Scrubs (2004) — J.D.'s Mother
- The D.A. (2004) — Laura Rainer
- The District (2004) — Katherine Lustig
- 24 (2004) — President's Aide
- What I Like About You (2003) — Martha
- Looney Tunes: Stranger Than Fiction (2003) (Video) — Additional voices
- Looney Tunes: Reality Check (2003) (Video) — Additional voices
- June & Orlando (2003) (Short film) — Amanda
- Gilmore Girls (2003) — Helen Thompson
- Less than Perfect (2003) — Cassidy
- Slackers (2002) — Receptionist
- Passions (2001) — Nora Randall
- Charmed (2001) — News Director
- Once and Again (2001) — Marlys
- We Married Margo (2000) — Woman Dumped By Margo
- Buffy the Vampire Slayer (1999) — Curator
- Introducing Dorothy Dandridge (1999) (TV movie) — Ring-a-ding Girl
- Sunset Beach (1997) — Stewardess

=== Writing ===
- Manifest (2018–2021)
- Life Sentence (2018)
- Lethal Weapon (2017)
- The Mysteries of Laura (2014–2016)
