= Jack Messina =

American actor

- Occupation: Actor
- Years active: 2018–present

Jack Messina is an American teen actor, best known for his role as Cal Stone in the NBC/Netflix sci-fi drama Manifest.

== Early life ==
Messina started acting at the age of seven, attending classes at the Actors Garage in Manhasset, Long Island, just east of New York City.

== Career ==
Messina made his television debut in September 2018, in the pilot episode of NBC's science fiction drama Manifest; from 2018 to 2021, he played the main cast character of Cal Stone, a young boy struggling with terminal leukaemia and a passenger on the mysterious returning airplane Flight 828. In the season 3 finale, his character mysteriously aged five years, and the role was taken over by Ty Doran; while Doran played the older character through season 4 (2022–23), Messina returned in a guest appearance in the 2023 series finale, when the character (and the resolution of the plot) returned Flight 828 to the starting point of the series.

Messina appeared in a 2018 episode of The Marvelous Mrs. Maisel, as the younger son in an Italian immigrant family.

In 2022, Messina played the role of Chase, in the coming-of-age teenage drama film Over/Under, which focused on characters played by Anastasia Veronica Lee and Emajean Bullock.

Messina has made appearances in commercials for Eliquis and MVP Health.

Messina is a member of SAG-AFTRA, which has strict rules about children working on set; Messina had private tutoring on the set of Manifest to keep up with schoolwork.

== Personal life ==
Messina is keen on skiing during the winter. Messina's future hopes are to someday work with either Will Ferrell, Jim Carrey or Tom Hanks.

== Filmography ==
Year	Title	Role	Notes
2018–2023	Manifest	Cal Stone	Main cast (seasons 1-3), guest role (series finale)
2018	The Marvelous Mrs. Maisel	Salvatore	Episode: "The Punishment Room"
2022	Over/Under	Chase	Feature film
2023	Squall	Jack	Short film
