= Jeff Rake =

American television producer

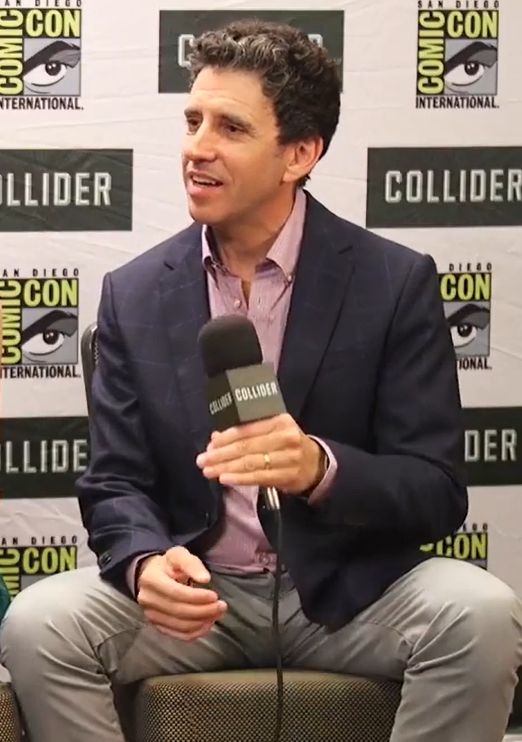
- Rake in 2018
- Born: Jeffrey Paul Rake; June 19, 1968 (age 58); Philadelphia, Pennsylvania
- Education: Columbia University (BA); UC Berkeley School of Law (JD)
- Occupations: Television showrunner, producer
- Years active: 2000–present
- Known for: Creating Manifest and The Mysteries of Laura

Jeffrey Paul Rake is an American television producer and writer. He is known for his work on Boston Legal and creating the NBC shows Manifest, The Mysteries of Laura and Miss Match.

== Biography ==
Rake was born in Philadelphia and grew up in Encino, Los Angeles. He attended Harvard-Westlake School and graduated from Columbia University in 1990. He was the president of Columbia College Student Council during his senior year. At Columbia, he was also a classmate of television producer Gina Fattore and Academy Award-winning film producer Dede Gardner.

He received a J.D. degree from UC Berkeley School of Law, where he was a finalist in the James Patterson McBaine Honors Moot Court Competition and an executive editor of the California Law Review.

After graduating from law school, Rake clerked for two federal judges, Judge Stanley Brotman of the District of New Jersey and Judge Majorie Rendell of the Eastern District of Pennsylvania then joined one of L.A.'s top law firms, Irell & Manella. During his tenure as a lawyer, he took a leave of absence and wrote the musical Hound Dog: A hip hOpera, an alternative history of Elvis Presley starring Wayne Brady. The play premiered in 1996 in Los Angeles.

Rake then entered the television business and co-created the Fox series The Street in 2000. He then put his legal knowledge to work by writing and producing episodes of Boston Legal and The Practice. He co-wrote the pilot for Boston Legal, co-created the series Miss Match and The Mysteries of Laura.

In 2017, he created Manifest. The show was initially cancelled, but was picked up by Netflix and became the third show to reach 100 days in Netflix's Top 10 charts. In August 2021, the show was renewed for a fourth season.

Los Angeles Times called him a member of the "Ex-Lawyers Club," a group of television showrunners, producers, and writers who were once lawyers before switching careers and joining the entertainment industry. Other ex-lawyers named by the Times were David E. Kelley, Carol Mendelsohn, Richard Appel, and Stephen Engel.

In June 2025, it was reported that he was co-authoring a science fiction novel that was also under consideration for development as a TV series.

== Personal life and family ==
Rake is married to Paulette Light, executive director of the Charles Bronfman prize, whom he met in college. They have four children together. He is Jewish. "As a Jewish writer, I’m inspired by Jewish themes of redemption, second chances and Tikkun olam,” he told the Jewish Journal. “We come to discover that the characters [on Manifest] are flawed human beings who’ve been given a second chance, an opportunity to redeem themselves."

== Filmography ==
Select film and television work by Jeff Rake
Year	Title	Screenwriter	Executive producer	Creator	Notes
2000–2001	The Street	Yes	Yes	Yes	Rake's television debut, wrote 4 episodes
2003	Miss Match	Yes	Yes	Yes	Wrote 6 episodes
2004	Boston Legal	Yes	Yes	No	Co-wrote pilot episode
2008	Cashmere Mafia	Yes	Yes	No	Wrote 1 episode
2013–2014	The Tomorrow People	Yes	No	No	Wrote 6 episodes
2014–2016	The Mysteries of Laura	Yes	Yes	Yes	Wrote 9 episodes
2018–2023	Manifest	Yes	Yes	Yes	Wrote 10 episodes
