= Manifest (TV series) =

American supernatural drama (2018–2023)

- Genre: Drama; Supernatural
- Created by: Jeff Rake
- Starring: Melissa Roxburgh; Josh Dallas; Athena Karkanis; J. R. Ramirez; Luna Blaise; Jack Messina; Parveen Kaur; Matt Long; Holly Taylor; Daryl Edwards; Ty Doran
- Composer: Danny Lux
- Country of origin: United States
- Original language: English
- No. of seasons: 4
- No. of episodes: 62 (list of episodes)

Production
- Executive producers: Robert Zemeckis; Jack Rapke; Jacqueline Levine; Jeff Rake; David Frankel (pilot); Joe Chappelle; Len Goldstein; Romeo Tirone
- Producers: Cathy Frank; Laura Putney; Margaret Easley; Harvey Waldman; Marta Gené Camps
- Cinematography: Tim Ives; Tim Norman; Joseph Bradley Smith; Sarah Cawley; John Inwood; Andrew Priestley
- Editors: Elena Maganini; Nicholas Erasmus; Scott Boyd; Steven Lang; Mark Conte; Nina M. Gilberti; Maura Corey; Matt Coleshill
- Camera setup: Single-camera
- Running time: 41–61 minutes
- Production companies: Compari Entertainment; Jeff Rake Productions; Universal Television (2018–2021); Warner Bros. Television

Original release
- Network: NBC
- Release: September 24, 2018 – June 10, 2021
- Network: Netflix
- Release: November 4, 2022 – June 2, 2023

Manifest is an American supernatural drama television series created by Jeff Rake that premiered on September 24, 2018, on NBC. It centers on the passengers and crew on a commercial airliner who suddenly reappear after their plane goes missing and they are presumed dead for five and a half years. It stars Melissa Roxburgh, Josh Dallas, Athena Karkanis, J. R. Ramirez, Luna Blaise, Jack Messina, Parveen Kaur, Matt Long, Holly Taylor, Daryl Edwards, and Ty Doran.

In October 2018, NBC ordered further episodes for the first season and subsequently renewed the series for a second season that aired in 2020, and again for a third in 2021. In June 2021, the series was canceled by NBC after three seasons. The series was added to Netflix shortly before it was canceled and immediately topped the viewing charts, persuading Netflix to renew Manifest for a fourth and final season consisting of twenty episodes split into two volumes, with the first releasing on November 4, 2022, and the second on June 2, 2023. In August 2026, a spin-off series titled Arrivals: A New Manifest Mystery was ordered to series by Netflix.

== Storyline ==
While traveling from Jamaica to New York City, on April 7, 2013, Montego Air Flight 828 experiences a brief period of severe turbulence. When they arrive at Stewart International Airport in Newburgh, New York, the plane's 191 passengers and crew learn from NSA deputy director Robert "Bobby" Vance that they landed on November 4, 2018, thus over five and a half years have passed while they were in the air, during which time they were presumed dead. As they rejoin society, the passengers must face the fact that their lives—and loved ones—are not the same as they were, while they also begin to experience guiding voices and visions representing events yet to occur, referred to as "callings".

== Cast and characters ==
=== Main ===
- Melissa Roxburgh as Michaela "Mick" Stone, a detective who worked at the NYPD's 129th Precinct, and Ben's sister. She was a passenger on Flight 828. She gets engaged to Jared before the flight. She later rediscovers Zeke. Ariana Jalia portrays a younger Michaela.
- Josh Dallas as Ben Stone, a college associate professor in mathematics, Michaela's brother, and father to Olive, Cal and Eden. He was a passenger on Flight 828.
- Athena Karkanis as Grace Stone (seasons 1–3; guest season 4), Ben's wife, Michaela's sister-in-law, and mother to Olive, Cal and Eden. She runs a catering business. She is fatally stabbed by Angelina at the end of the third season while trying to stop her from abducting Eden and dies in a now-teenage Cal's arms. In the series finale, Ben is reunited with Grace after the passengers are returned to 2013.
- J. R. Ramirez as Jared Vasquez, a detective at the NYPD's 129th Precinct and Michaela's ex-fiancé; he married Michaela's best friend during the five-plus year absence of Flight 828, but they divorce after Michaela's return. Jared is later promoted to lieutenant.
- Luna Blaise as Olive Stone, Ben and Grace's daughter, Michaela's niece, Cal's twin sister, and Eden's older sister. Jenna Kurmemaj portrays a young Olive in the first episode and early flashbacks while Samsara Leela Yett portrays her in the final episode.
- Jack Messina (seasons 1–3; guest season 4) and Ty Doran (season 4; guest season 3) as Cal Stone, Ben and Grace's son, Michaela's nephew, Eden's older brother, and Olive's twin brother, who is five and a half years younger than she after Flight 828 returns. Cal was a passenger on Flight 828. Jack Messina portrays a younger Cal while Ty Doran portrays a teenage Cal.
- Parveen Kaur as Saanvi Bahl, a doctor and medical researcher at Koch Hospital and passenger on Flight 828. She is later recruited to work for the NSA's Project Eureka task force that is investigating 828.
- Matt Long as Zeke Landon (seasons 2–4; recurring season 1), a hiker who got trapped in a cave during a blizzard and was presumed dead for a year. He returns to life in a situation similar to what happened to Flight 828 passengers. He later marries Michaela and becomes the first person to beat his death date after saving Cal's life. After beating his death date, Zeke develops empathic powers. At the end of the first part of the fourth season, Zeke sacrifices himself to save Cal by absorbing Cal's returned cancer. In the series finale, after being returned to 2013, Michaela meets Zeke again for the first time to pursue a relationship anew as he is seen working as a taxi driver. Colin Critchley portrays a younger Zeke.
- Holly Taylor as Angelina Meyer (seasons 3–4), a Flight 828 passenger who is held captive by her religiously fanatic parents in Costa Rica after her return, believing her to be a demon or a witch. She is later rescued by Michaela and Zeke and taken in by the Stones to live with them. However, as the intensity of the Callings continues, Angelina slowly loses her sanity and becomes maniacal – a false prophet who believes that she is destined to survive the Death Date and lead God's chosen people in a new world. In the series finale, Angelina's numerous evil deeds (including her murder of Grace and abduction of Eden) result in her not surviving the Death Date and burning to ash instead. While she does show remorse in her final moments, it is not enough to redeem her.
- Daryl Edwards as Robert Vance (season 4; recurring seasons 1–3), the director of the NSA who leads the investigation of the re-emergence of Montego Air Flight 828. Despite apparently being killed in the first season during the raid on a Singularity Project's base, he is revealed to still be alive in the second season. With only a few people aware he is alive, Vance begins working covertly to uncover the mysteries of Flight 828 and his government's sinister objectives. After his survival is revealed to the government in the third season, Vance resumes his old position and heads up a new taskforce known as Project Eureka, examining the rebuilt wreckage of the plane for clues. In the fourth season, Vance has left the NSA and gone rogue again. In the series finale after the passengers are returned to 2013, Vance is called to investigate the disappearances of the eleven passengers who did not survive the Death Date as he passes Ben.

=== Recurring ===
==== Introduced in season one ====
- Frank Deal as Bill Daly, the pilot of Flight 828. After vanishing in season 1, he abruptly reappears for a moment in Flight 828's cockpit after the tail fin is returned to the ocean. In the final season, he reappears in the detention center as the subject of government experiments. Angelina later manipulates him into breaking out of his room. Despite Ben's intervention, Daly was shot by the guards. His corpse was later swallowed by a tremor. In a deleted scene from the series finale, Daly is shown to have been resurrected alongside the other lost passengers, but later disintegrates into ash just like the 11 unworthy passengers right in front of Vance and other NSA agents after the plane returns to 2013.
- Leajato Amara Robinson as Daniel Amuta Clarke, the co-pilot of Flight 828. Clarke was one of the 13 "dangerous" passengers the Registry had failed to apprehend.
- Mugga as Bethany Collins, a flight attendant on Flight 828 and Georgia's wife.
- Alfredo Narciso as Captain Riojas, the police captain of the NYPD's 129th Precinct where Michaela and Jared work.
- Curtiss Cook as Radd Campbell, a musician on Flight 828. Before leaving for Jamaica, he left his son with a neighbor.
- Richard Topol as Harvey Stein, a passenger on Flight 828. After three people he told about the Callings died, Harvey came to believe that he was the Angel of Death. Despite Michaela’s efforts to talk him out of it, he killed himself. In the series finale, Harvey is resurrected along with the other lost passengers when the plane is returned to 2013.
- Julienne Hanzelka Kim as Kelly Taylor, a passenger on Flight 828. After the twenty people who watch as the Flight 828 aircraft explodes are warned not to discuss what they know with anyone, Kelly goes on national media to express what she believes. While she is watching herself on television later, she is shot in the head by her housekeeper. The building that she owned later appears as a hiding place for the stowaway Thomas and is discovered to be the hiding place of the Omega Sapphire. In the series finale, Kelly is resurrected along with the other lost passengers when the plane is returned to 2013.
- Malachy Cleary as Steve Stone, Michaela and Ben's father and Cal, Olive, and Eden's grandfather. During season four, Steve takes up a job and later suffers a stroke.
- Geraldine Leer as Karen Stone, Michaela and Ben's mother and Cal, Olive, and Eden's grandmother. She dies while Flight 828 is missing. Her favorite Bible verse is Romans 8:28, which includes "all things work together for good." The verse is often repeated by the Stones when they discuss the callings. By the series finale, Karen is alive when Flight 828 arrives on the date that it was supposed to arrive.
- Omar Torres II as Tony Diaz, a police officer in the NYPD's 129th Precinct.
- Victoria Cartagena as Lourdes, Michaela's former best friend who married Jared after Michaela's disappearance. After learning of Michaela and Jared's brief affair, she divorces Jared.
- Tim Moriarty as Tim Powell, the deputy director of the NSA.
- Jared Grimes as Adrian Shannon, a passenger on Flight 828. He is an entrepreneur who forms the Church of the Returned.
- Olli Haaskivi as Isaiah, a passionate but fragile member of the Church of the Returned. He starts a fire at a nightclub to show others that the Flight 828 passengers are miracles, but dies in the act.
- Adriane Lenox as Beverly, Evie's mother. After the accident which killed her daughter, she blames Michaela for what happened. Beverly later develops dementia and forgets that Evie is dead, and Glen stops giving her the news and lets her believe Evie is just not home. After the death of her husband, she allows Michaela and Zeke to live with her per Greg's video will as Michaela is reluctant to have her in assisted living. In season 4, she is mentioned to have died as seen in "Go-Around" when Michaela nears her tombstone that is next to Evie's tombstone during a jog.
- Daniel Sunjata as Danny, Grace's boyfriend whom she meets after Ben's disappearance. He became a father figure to Olive during this time, and formed a close bond with her.
- Sheldon Best as Thomas, a stowaway smuggled in by Bethany on flight 828.
- Jacqueline Antaramian as Anna Ross, a translator and a Flight 828 passenger. She hid Angelina and Eden upon being convinced that Ben was evil, but quickly found out this was a lie. She was killed by Noelle for helping Noelle's daughter.
- Francesca Faridany as Fiona Clarke, a scientist on Flight 828 who is involved with Unified Dynamic Systems and the Singularity project. After disappearing with Captain Daly, she is found by Cal in a zoned-out state as Angelina manipulates Eden into putting Fiona out of her misery. In the series finale, she is amongst those resurrected after the plane is sent back to 2013.
- Nikolai Tsankov as Marko Valeriev, a Bulgarian passenger of Flight 828 who is among the foreign nationals in the custody of Unified Dynamic Systems and the Singularity project.
- Brandon Schraml as Director Jansen, a representative of The Major. He is tasked with oversight of Autumn Cox.
- Shirley Rumierk as Autumn Cox, a Flight 828 passenger who has outstanding arrest warrants due to being a victim of identity theft. She is used by Laurence's superiors to find out what Ben knows about the Singularity project. In season 4, she is among the Flight 828 passengers who join Angelina's cult. In the series finale, she is one of the eleven passengers who burn to ash on the Death Date for their evil deeds.
- Kerry Malloy as Paul Santino, an ex-attorney passenger on Flight 828 who abused his wife. Santino was one of the 13 “dangerous” passengers the Registry had failed to apprehend. He is among those who sided with Angelina and was reduced to ash by the series finale.
- Marc Menchaca as James Griffin, a robber, retrieved after more than 3 days (later revealed to be exactly 82 hours and 8 minutes) alive in the East River. He is the first person shown suffering the Death Date, as he drowns on dry land exactly 82 hours and 8 minutes after returning to life.
- Maryann Plunkett as Priscilla Landon, Zeke's mother.
- Ed Herbstman as Troy Davis, a lab tech working with Saanvi to solve the mystery of the 828 passenger mutations. He is drugged and disappears for a while, before resurfacing as a member of the NSA's "Project Eureka" 828 task force. He is apparently working against his will, as he is sympathetic towards the 828 passengers.
- Elizabeth Marvel as Kathryn Fitz/The Major, a woman leading a government entity that is looking to weaponize the "callings" the 828 passengers frequently experience. In "False Horizon", she is identified as U.S. Army Major General Kathryn Fitz, a specialist in psychological warfare with thirty years of experience in covert operations. She is later accidentally poisoned by Saanvi. Before dying, Fitz states that she planned to infect people with the same blood that is in the Flight 828 passengers, in hopes of replicating the mutation. In season 3, Vance is revealed to have covered up the Major’s murder and made it look like the work of an enemy spy in order to protect Saanvi. It is also stated that the government shut down the Major’s project upon the Major's death.

==== Introduced in season two ====
- Andrene Ward-Hammond as Captain Kate Bowers, the police captain of the NYPD's 129th Precinct who succeeds Riojas.
- Brendan Burke as Emmett, Vance's mercenary.
- Ellen Tamaki as Drea Mikami, Michaela's new partner at the NYPD.
- Garrett Wareing as TJ Morrison, a college student and Flight 828 passenger who becomes close with Olive and helps Ben try to solve the mystery of the plane's disappearance and return. Due to his disappearance, TJ lost his mother who committed suicide. He departs for Egypt at the end of the second season to continue his work there, but keeps in touch with the Stones and sends them clues that he finds. In season 4, TJ returns to help the Stones with the mystery of the Omega Sapphire and begins a romantic relationship with Olive. In the series finale after being returned to 2013, TJ is forced to move on from Olive, who is younger and no longer remembers him. TJ is reunited at the airport with his mother.
- Leah Gibson as Tamara, a bartender who works at a bar that is frequented by the Xers.
- Carl Lundstedt as Billy, Tamara's brother and an Xer. He and the Xers with him are later detained by the police following their kidnapping of Zeke. In season 4, Billy was released from prison and started hunting the 828ers that are still at large in light of most of them being detained by the NSA's registry. Ben and Michaela subdued him and left him taped up to his car for Jared, Drea, and Officer Wicks to find.
- Maury Ginsberg as Simon White, an elite faculty member of the college that hires Ben who is revealed to be secretly leading the Xers. He and those involved are later detained by the police following Billy's kidnapping of Zeke.
- Sydney Morton as Alex Bates, а scientist who was in a relationship with Saanvi Bahl.
- James McMenamin as Jace Baylor, a drug dealer who later kidnaps Cal as part of his revenge on Michaela for busting his drug operation. Along with his brother Pete and Kory Jephers, they are often referred to as the "meth heads". After disappearing under the ice, he re-emerges 84 days later in a situation similar to what happened to Flight 828 passengers. Jace seeks revenge upon Michaela once again, murdering Grace's stepbrother Tarik in the process. Jace's resurrection proves to be part of an ancient test known as the Last Trial which he fails when he refuses to give up vengeance on Michaela, leading to his second demise as he spews out lake water. However, his failure also dooms Pete and Kory who had passed their own parts of the test as they are grabbed by a shadowy figure. Their bodies end up in Project Eureka's custody.
- Devin Harjes as Pete Baylor, the brother of Jace who assists in his drug operation. After disappearing under the ice, he re-emerges 84 days later in a situation similar to what happened to Flight 828 passengers. He forms a romantic relationship with Angelina, but dies once again when his death date arrives after Jace fails the Last Trial when a shadowy figure grabs him which leaves Angelina devastated. Their bodies end up in Project Eureka's custody.
- DazMann Still as Kory Jephers, a bus driver allied with Jace. After disappearing under the ice, he re-emerges 84 days later in a situation similar to what happened to Flight 828 passengers. He dies once again when his death date arrives after Jace fails the Last Trial when a shadowy figure grabs him.
- Erika Chase as Maxine Taylor, Olive's friend and a member of the "Believers" who shares her testimony about finding comfort and community after the disappearance of Flight 828.

==== Introduced in season three ====
- Lauren Norvelle as Sarah Fitz, The Major's daughter who begins dating Jared after seeking out the NYPD to investigate her mother's disappearance.
- Heidi Armbruster as Noelle Meyer, Angelina's mother who was сonvinced that the Callings are evil, Noelle believes her daughter and all 828ers are doing the devil’s work. She and her husband kept Angelina locked up until a Calling led Michaela to rescue her. Later, she and her husband began to kill every passenger who helped her daughter. She was arrested after trying to murder Adrian.
- Ben Livingston as Kenneth Meyer, Angelina’s father who tries to kill Eden in season 4. Zeke recognizes him as he met him while Michaela and him first met Angelina’s parents in Costa Rica. Olive kills Angelina’s father by sending him by the window in order to protect Eden.
- Warner Miller as Tarik, Grace's stepbrother who lives somewhere in Upstate New York. He is later stabbed by Jace and dies of his wounds in Grace's arms.
- Patricia Mauceri as Director Zimmer, a director of the NSA.
- Will Peltz as Levi, an archaeologist at the college where Ben works who helps Olive decrypt an ancient parchment connected to the Death Date. He is briefly mentioned in season 4 by TJ as the person who gave him back the parchment.
- Mahira Kakkar as Aria Gupta, a lead scientist of the NSA's "Project Eureka" 828 task force.
- J.D. Martin as Dr. Patrick Cooper, a seismologist working on the NSA's "Project Eureka" 828 task force.
- Ali Lopez-Sohaili as Eagan Tehrani, an 828 passenger with a photographic memory who aligns with several 828 passengers in opposition to Ben's leadership.
- Arianna Esquerre as Astrid Koren, a passenger on Flight 828 who was one of the 13 “dangerous” passengers the Registry had failed to apprehend. She was among the refugees that took Angelina in. Astrid later left Angelina and found her way to the building that Drea purchased. Astrid is later one of the passengers to survive the Death Date.

==== Introduced in season four ====
- Brianna and Gianna Riccio and Paisley Day Herrera as Eden Stone, the daughter of Ben and Grace and younger sister of Cal and Olive. The Riccio sisters portrayed Eden in the first half of season 4 and Paisley Day Herrera portrayed Eden during the final half of season 4.
- Clem Cheung as Henry Kim, a passenger on Flight 828. In his childhood, Henry was struck by a bolt of lightning, causing a sear to form on his arm. His father told him that the sear is a dragon that gives him strength. Cal discovers that he bears the same sear as Henry.
- Sarah Marie Rodriguez as Violet Wheeler, a passenger on Flight 828 who served as a love interest to Cal. A romance between them appeared to be blossoming but was cut short when she lost her life at the hands of Noelle. In the series finale, Violet is resurrected along with the other lost passengers when the plane is returned to 2013 and she appears to form a bond with TJ at the baggage claim.
- Bru Ajueyitsi as Joe Butler, a general contractor and passenger on Flight 828 who is separated from his son Charlie and placed in the 828 detention center. Subsequently, Charlie is nearly lost to human trafficking, but Callings save him in the nick of time. After returning to 2013, Joe reunites with his son as a young boy.
- Carl Hendrick Louis as Leo, the boyfriend of 828 stowaway Thomas and the cousin of the flight attendant Bethany. Leo is mentioned in season 1 to have gone missing during the years following the plane's disappearance. Leo reappears as a member of the Omega Order in season 4 going by the alias of Kenroy and he helps the passengers to find the Omega Sapphire, later reuniting with Thomas. After the plane is sent back to 2013, Thomas rushes off to reunite with Leo.
- Naaji Sky Adzimah as Polly, a passenger on Flight 828. She gave birth to a child while in the 828 detention center.

== Episodes ==
Season	Episodes		Originally released			Rank	Avg. viewership (in millions)
Season	Episodes		First released	Last released	Network	Rank	Avg. viewership (in millions)
1	16		September 24, 2018	February 18, 2019	NBC	9	12.61
2	13		January 6, 2020	April 6, 2020	NBC	38	7.70
3	13		April 1, 2021	June 10, 2021	NBC	54	5.35
4	20	10	November 4, 2022		Netflix	—N/a	—N/a
4	20	10	June 2, 2023		Netflix	—N/a	—N/a

== Production ==
=== Development ===
Jeff Rake had first unsuccessfully pitched the idea for the story ten years earlier, but was only able to get interest from network executives after the 2014 disappearance of Malaysia Airlines Flight 370.

On August 23, 2017, NBC gave the production a put pilot commitment. The pilot was written by Rake, who was also set to serve as executive producer alongside Robert Zemeckis and Jack Rapke. Jackie Levine was expected to serve as a co-executive producer. Production companies involved with the pilot were slated to consist of Compari Entertainment and Warner Bros. Television. In January 2018, NBC gave the production a pilot order and that David Frankel would direct and executive produce the pilot. In May 2018, NBC gave the production a series order of thirteen episodes with a premiere in third quarter of 2018 and a Monday timeslot at 10 p.m. On June 19, 2018, the series premiere was set for September 24, 2018. On October 18, 2018, NBC ordered an additional three episodes of the series, bringing the total up to sixteen episodes.

On April 15, 2019, NBC renewed the series for a second season, which premiered on January 6, 2020. On June 15, 2020, NBC renewed the series for a third season which premiered on April 1, 2021.

=== Casting ===
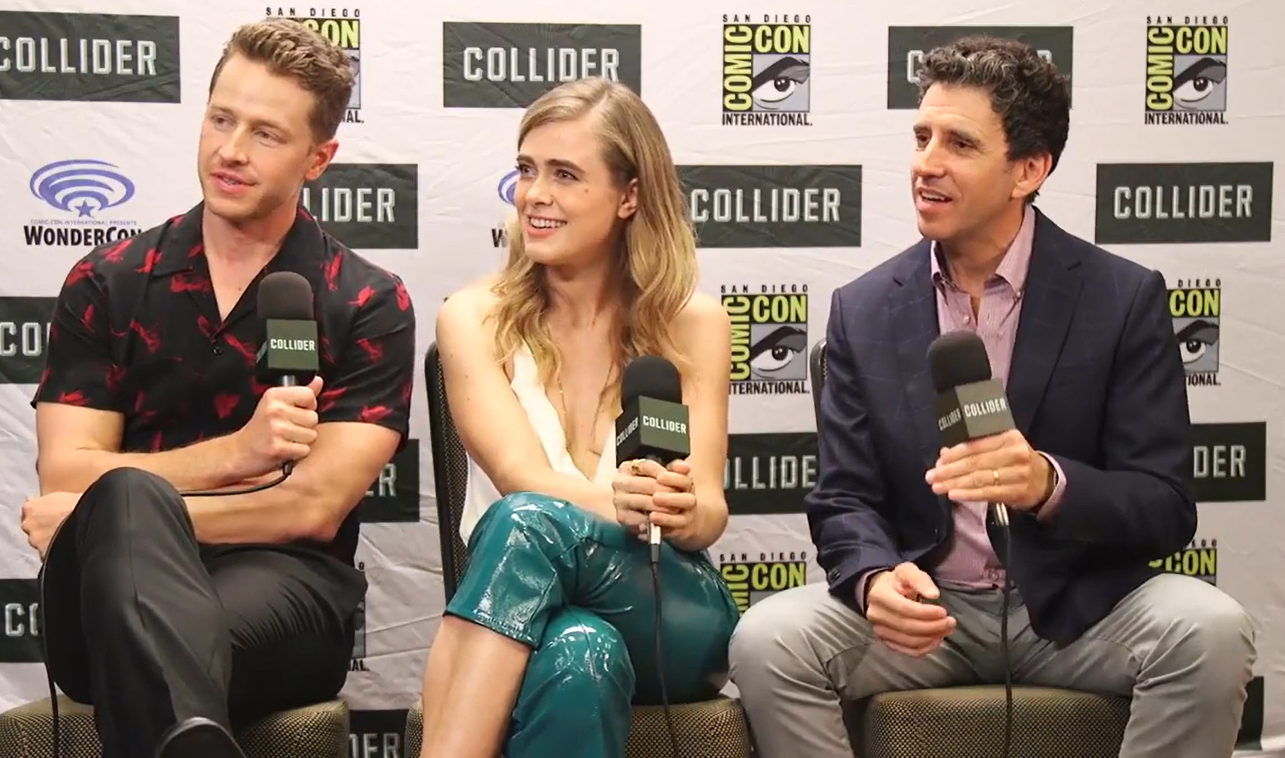
Josh Dallas, Melissa Roxburgh and Jeff Rake at San Diego Comic-Con in 2018

In February 2018, Josh Dallas, Melissa Roxburgh, and J. R. Ramirez joined the pilot's main cast. Athena Karkanis, Parveen Kaur, and Luna Blaise were cast in main roles the following month. In August 2019, Yasha Jackson, Garrett Wareing, Andrene Ward-Hammond, and Ellen Tamaki were cast in recurring roles for the second season. In October 2019, Leah Gibson and Carl Lundstedt had been cast in recurring capacities. On September 22, 2020, Holly Taylor was cast a new series regular for the third season. On October 22, 2020, Will Peltz was cast in a recurring role for the third season.

=== Cancellation and revival ===
On June 14, 2021, NBC canceled the series after three seasons. Due to the cliffhanger ending of the third season and the fact that creator Jeff Rake originally sold Manifest to NBC with a six-season plan mapped out, Rake and others were hopeful that the series would get picked up by another platform. One possibility was Netflix, where the first two seasons debuted at number three and quickly rose to the most watched show on the streaming service. Rake tweeted on June 15: "I am devastated by NBC's decision to cancel us. That we've been shut down in the middle is a gut punch to say the least. Hoping to find a new home. You fans deserve an ending to your story." On June 21, 2021, Warner announced that negotiations with Netflix had broken down and that they would no longer be seeking a new home for the series. The following week, Rake stated that: "We're trying to find a way to conclude the series. Could take a week, a month, a year. But we're not giving up. You deserve an end to the story."

On June 30, 2021, Entertainment Weekly reported that Rake was looking for a platform that would bankroll a two-hour Manifest film to tie the loose ends from the third-season finale. Said Rake, "There is a huge appetite for people wanting to know what's that end of the story, what happened to the passengers, what ultimately happened to that airplane."

The following month, it was reported that talks had resumed between Warner Bros. Television and NBC regarding the series' renewal for a potential fourth season, with Netflix also taking part in the renewal discussions. On August 28, 2021, Netflix renewed Manifest for a fourth and final season, consisting of 20 episodes, split across two volumes. Dallas and Roxburgh were set to return, with additional original cast members in negotiations to return as well. On September 9, 2021, it reported that Kaur, Blaise, Taylor return as series regulars alongside Dallas, Roxburgh, and Ramirez while Karkanis and Messina exited and Ty Doran was promoted to series regular taking over Messina's role as the older Cal. A day later, it was announced that Daryl Edwards has been promoted to series regular. Matt Long was later confirmed to be joining the cast for the fourth season. The first volume of the season was released on November 4, 2022, followed by the second on June 2, 2023.

== Release ==
On July 21, 2018, the series held a panel at San Diego Comic-Con. Those in attendance included executive producer Jeff Rake and actors Melissa Roxburgh and Josh Dallas. On August 28, 2018, the first nine minutes of the first episode were released among various digital outlets. The series also took part in the 12th Annual PaleyFest Fall Television Previews on September 10, 2018, which featured a preview screening of the series.

== Reception ==
=== Critical response ===
The series was initially met with a mixed response from critics upon its premiere. On the review aggregation website Rotten Tomatoes, the first season holds an approval rating of 56% with an average rating of 6.2/10, based on 39 reviews. The website's critical consensus reads, "Manifest's attempts to balance supernatural mystery and melodrama largely work thanks to its well-chosen cast — though it could use a few more distinguishing characteristics." Metacritic, which uses a weighted average, assigned the series a score of 55 out of 100 based on 15 critics, indicating "mixed or average reviews". On Rotten Tomatoes, the fourth season has an approval rating of 86% with an average rating of 8.6/10, based on 7 reviews.

=== Ratings ===
The premiere episode was both the top-rated new show for the broadcast season and the top-rated show airing that week.

Viewership and ratings per season of Manifest
Season	Timeslot (ET)	Episodes	First aired		Last aired		TV season	Viewership rank	Avg. viewers (millions)
Season	Timeslot (ET)	Episodes	Date	Viewers (millions)	Date	Viewers (millions)	TV season	Viewership rank	Avg. viewers (millions)
1	Monday 10:00 p.m.	16	September 24, 2018	10.40	February 18, 2019	5.36	2018–19	9	12.61
2	Monday 10:00 p.m.	13	January 6, 2020	4.73	April 6, 2020	4.36	2019–20	38	7.70
3	Thursday 8:00 p.m. (1–5, 7, 9–12); Thursday 9:00 p.m. (6, 8, 13)	13	April 1, 2021	3.99	June 10, 2021	2.76	2020–21	54	5.35

=== Streaming response ===
Netflix started streaming Manifest in June 2021 and 25 million accounts in the U.S. and Canada watched the show within its first 28 days of streaming. The series remained in Netflix's Top 10 list for 71 days since its debut and was No. 1 in the U.S. for 19 days. It then went on to break Netflix's streaming record with 6th straight week over 1 billion minutes viewed. By September 2021, Manifest was the third show in Netflix history to sit in its Top 10 list for one hundred days.

=== Accolades ===
In 2019, the series was nominated for Best Science Fiction TV Series category for the 45th Saturn Awards. In the same year, Manifest was also nominated for Best Primetime Program – Drama category for the 34rd Imagen Awards.

== Spin-off ==
In August 2024, Rake said he and his writing partners were still working on developing a spin-off continuation of the series. In announcing the upcoming release of his novel on his official social media accounts in June 2025, Rake wrote that he was "still working away on a potential Manifest spinoff! Not there yet.".

In August 2026, Arrivals: A New Manifest Mystery, a spin-off series featuring a new cast of characters and storylines in the same universe, was greenlit by Netflix. Rake, Margaret Easley and Laura Putney are co-creators, executive producers and showrunners of the series.

== See also ==
- Departure, a TV series about a crashed airliner investigation
- Lost, a TV series about a crashed airliner on a mysterious island
- The 4400, a TV series about people from various different times in the past who come back to life
- 4400, a remake of the former TV series
- Les Revenants ("The Returned"), a French TV series about people who mysteriously return years after their death without having aged and their attempts to reintegrate into their former lives
- The Returned, an American remake of the French TV series
- Glitch, an Australian TV series about people from various different times in the past who come back to life in a country town
