= Economy of Jamaica =

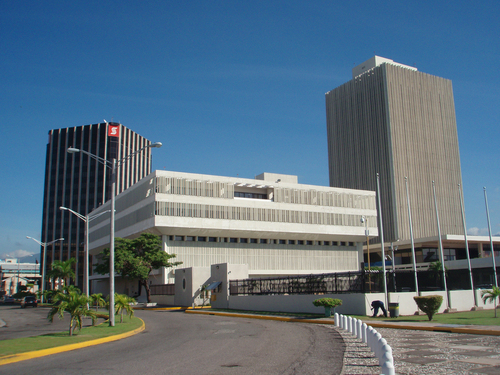
- Currency: Jamaican dollar (JMD, J$)
- Trade organisations: CARICOM , WTO
- Country group: Developing country; Upper-middle income country

Statistics
- Population: ▼2,726,667 (2018)
- GDP: ▲$20.586 billion (nominal, 2024); ▲$33.775 billion (PPP, 2024)
- GDP rank: 118th (nominal, 2019); 133rd (PPP, 2019)
- GDP growth: 1.3% (2024)
- GDP per capita: ▲$7,487 (nominal, 2024 est.); ▲$12,283 (PPP, 2024 est.)
- GDP per capita rank: 97th (nominal, 2018); 109th (PPP, 2018)
- GDP per capita growth: -0.5% (2024)
- GDP by sector: agriculture: 7.5%; industry: 21.3%; services: 71.2%; (2017 est.)
- Inflation (CPI): ▼3.7% (2018)
- Population below national poverty line: 17.1% (2016 est.); 29.7% on less than $5.50/day (2004)
- Gini coefficient: ▼35 medium (2016)
- Human Development Index: ▼0.709 high (2021) (110th); ▼0.591 medium IHDI (2021)
- Labour force: ▲1,514,936 (2019); ▲58.2% employment rate (2018)
- Unemployment: 3.5% (October 2024)
- Average gross salary: J$272,604 (£1,493/$2,498)
- Average net salary: J$255,021 (£1,396/$2,337)
- Main industries: tourism, bauxite/alumina, food processing, light manufactures, rum, cement, metal, paper, chemical products, telecommunications

External
- Exports: ▲$1.296 billion (2017 est.)
- Export goods: alumina, bauxite, chemicals, coffee, mineral fuels, waste and scrap metals, sugar, yams
- Main export partners: United States 39.1%; United Kingdom 36.6%; Netherlands 12.3%; Canada 8.4%; (2017)
- Imports: ▲$5.151 billion (2017 est.)
- Import goods: food and other consumer goods, industrial supplies, fuel, parts and accessories of capital goods, machinery and transport equipment, construction materials
- Main import partners: ChinaPR” 41.8%; United States 35.6%; Colombia 6.8%; Trinidad and Tobago 4.7%; (2017)
- FDI stock: $15.03 billion (2016); Abroad: $604 million (2016)
- Current account: ▼ −$679 million (2017 est.)
- Gross external debt: ▲$14.94 billion (31 December 2017 est.)

Public finance
- Government debt: ▼101% of GDP (2017 est.)
- Foreign reserves: ▲$3.781 billion (31 December 2017 est.)
- Budget balance: +0.5% (of GDP) (2017 est.)
- Revenue: 4.382 billion (2017 est.)
- Spending: 4.314 billion (2017 est.)
- Economic aid: recipient: $102.7 million (1995)
- Credit rating: Standard & Poor's: B− (Domestic); B− (Foreign); B (T&C Assessment); Outlook: Stable; Moody's: B3 Outlook: Stable; Fitch: B−; Outlook: Positive
- All values, unless otherwise stated, are in US dollars.

Jamaica has a developing economy heavily reliant on services, accounting for 71% of the country's GDP. It has natural resources and a climate conducive to agriculture and tourism. The discovery of bauxite in the 1940s and the subsequent establishment of the bauxite-alumina industry shifted Jamaica's economy from sugar, and bananas. Weakness in the financial sector, speculation, and lower levels of investment erode confidence in the productive sector. The government continues its efforts to raise new sovereign debt in local and international financial markets to meet its U.S. dollar debt obligations, to mop up liquidity to maintain the exchange rate and to help fund the current budget deficit. The Jamaican government's economic policies encourage foreign investment in areas that earn or save foreign exchange, generate employment, and use local raw materials. The government also provides a wide range of incentives to investors.

Free trade zones have stimulated investment in garment assembly, light manufacturing, and data entry by foreign firms. However, over the last 5 years, the garment industry has suffered from reduced export earnings, continued factory closures, and rising unemployment. The Government of Jamaica hopes to encourage economic activity through a combination of privatisation, financial sector restructuring, reduced interest rates, and by boosting tourism and related productive activities. Since the first quarter of 2006, the economy of Jamaica has undergone a period of staunch growth. With inflation for the 2006 calendar year down to 6.0% and unemployment down to 8.9%, the nominal GDP grew by an unprecedented 2.9%. An investment programme in island transportation and utility infrastructure and gains in the tourism, mining, and service sectors all contributed this figure. All projections for 2007 show an even higher potential for economic growth with all estimates over 3.0% and hampered only by urban crime and public policies. Jamaica was ranked 79th in the Global Innovation Index in 2024.

In 2006, Jamaica became part of the CARICOM Single Market and Economy (CSME) as one of the pioneering members. The global economic downturn had a significant impact on the Jamaican economy for the years 2007 to 2009, resulting in negative economic growth. The government implemented a new Debt Management Initiative, the Jamaica Debt Exchange (JDX) on 14 January 2010. The initiative would see holders of Government of Jamaica (GOJ) bonds returning the high interest earning instruments for bonds with lower yields and longer maturities. The offer was taken up by over 95% of local financial institutions and was deemed a success by the government.

== Economic history ==
Before independence, Jamaica's economy was largely focused on agriculture with the vast majority of the labour force engaged in the production of sugar, bananas, and tobacco. According to one study, 18th century Jamaica had the highest wealth inequality in the world, as a very small, slave-owning elite was extremely wealthy while the rest of the population lived on the edge of subsistence. These products were mainly exported to the United Kingdom, Canada, and to the United States of America.

Jamaica's trade relationships expanded substantially from 1938 to 1946, with total imports almost doubling from £6,485,000 to £12,452,000.

In the years following independence, Jamaica experienced an economic boom driven largely by the bauxite industry and expanding tourism sector. By the late 1960s, Jamaica was producing around 21 percent of the world's bauxite output, making bauxite one of the country's most important industries. The Jamaican government also encouraged foreign investment, particularly from American corporations, as part of its economic development strategy.

After independence in 1962, the Jamaican government pursued policies aimed at economic growth. However, by the late 1990s, many sectors of the economy had contracted, with the exception of bauxite/alumina, energy, and tourism. In 2000, Jamaica recorded its first year of positive economic growth since 1995, which was attributed to continued tight macroeconomic policies.

Inflation fell from 25% in 1995 to single digits in 2000, reaching a multidecade low of 4.3% in 2004. Through periodic intervention in the market, the central bank also has prevented any abrupt drop in the exchange rate. The Jamaican dollar has been slipping, despite intervention, resulting in an average exchange rate of J$73.40 per US$1.00 and J136.2 per €1.00 (February 2011). In addition, inflation has been trending upward since 2004 and is projected to once again reach a double digit rate of 12–13% through the year 2008 due to a combination of unfavorable weather damaging crops and increasing agricultural imports and high energy prices.

Over the last 30 years, real per capita GDP increased at an average of just one per cent per year, making Jamaica one of the slowest growing developing countries in the world. To reverse this trajectory, the Government of Jamaica embarked on a comprehensive and ambitious program of reforms for which it has garnered national and international support: a four-year Extended Fund Facility (EFF) by the International Monetary Fund (IMF) providing a support package of US$932 million; World Bank Group and the Inter-American Development Bank (IDB) programs providing US$510 million each to facilitate the GoJ's economic reform agenda to stabilise the economy, reduce debt and create the conditions for growth and resilience. In addition, the International Finance Corporation (IFC) and Multilateral Investment Guarantee Agency (MIGA) will continue to support private sector development. The Bruce Golding-led government was successful in entering into a borrowing arrangement with the IMF on 4 February 2010 for the amount of US$1.27b. The loan agreement is for a period of three years.

In April 2014, the Governments of Jamaica and China signed the preliminary agreements for the first phase of the Jamaican Logistics Hub (JLH) – the initiative that aims to position Kingston as the fourth node in the global logistics chain, joining Rotterdam, Dubai and Singapore, and serving the Americas. The Project, when completed, is expected to provide many jobs for Jamaicans, Economic Zones for multinational companies and much needed economic growth to alleviate the country's heavy debt-to-GDP ratio. Strict adherence to the IMF's refinancing programme and preparations for the JLH has favourably affected Jamaica's credit rating and outlook from the three biggest rating agencies. In 2018, both Moody's and Standard and Poor Credit ratings upgraded Jamaica's ratings to both "stable and positive" respectively.

The reform program is beginning to bear fruit: Institutional reforms and measures to improve the environment for the private sector have started to restore confidence in the Jamaican economy. Jamaica jumped 27 places to 58 among 189 economies worldwide in the 2015 Doing Business ranking, the country's credit rating has improved and the Government has successfully raised more than US$2 billion in the international capital in the markets in 2014 and 2015. Despite some revival, economic growth is still low: the Jamaican Government is forecasting real gross domestic product (GDP) growth of 1.9 per cent for the fiscal year 2015/2016 and the country continues to be confronted by serious social issues that predominantly affect youth, such as high levels of crime and violence and high unemployment. Jamaica, which had seen its poverty rate drop almost 20 per cent over two decades, saw it increase by eight per cent in a few years. The unemployment rate in Jamaica is approximately 6.0% (April 2022, Statistical Institute of Jamaica), with youth unemployment more than twice the national rate, albeit trending downwards (15%). However, among Jamaica's assets are its skilled labour force and strong social and governance indicators.

== Primary industries ==
=== Agriculture ===
Agricultural production is an important contributor to Jamaica's economy. However, it is vulnerable to extreme weather, such as hurricanes and to competition from neighbouring countries such as the USA. Other difficulties faced by farmers include thefts from the farm, known as praedial larceny. Agricultural production accounted for 7.4% of GDP in 1997, providing employment for nearly a quarter of the country. Jamaica's agriculture, together with forestry and fishing, accounted for about 6.6% of GDP in 1999. Sugar has been produced in Jamaica for centuries, it is the nation's dominant agricultural export. Sugar is produced in nearly every parish. The production of raw sugar in the year 2000 was estimated at 175,000 tons, a decrease from 290,000 tons in 1978.

Jamaican agriculture has been less prominent in GDP in the 2000s than other industries, hitting an all-time low between 2004 and 2008. This may have been due to a reaction to increased competition as international trade policies were enacted. For example, as NAFTA was enacted in 1993, a significant amount of Caribbean exports to the United States diminished, being out competed by Latin American exports. Another example is the Banana Import Regime's 3rd phase, in which EU nations had first given priority in banana imports to previously colonised nations. Under pressure by the World Trade Organization, the EU policy was altered to provide a non-discriminatory trade agreement. Jamaica's banana industry was easily outpriced by American companies exporting Latin American goods. Jamaica's agriculture industry is now bouncing back, growing from being 6.6% of GDP to 7.2%.

Sugar formed 7.1% of the exports in 1999 and Jamaica made up about 4.8% of the total production of sugar in the Caribbean. Sugar is also used for the production of by-products such as molasses, rum and some wallboard is made from bagasse.

Banana production in 1999 was 130,000 tons. Bananas formed 2.4% of the exports in 1999 and Jamaica formed around 7.5% of the total production of banana in the Caribbean. Jamaica stopped exporting banana in 2008 after suffering from several years of hurricanes that devastated the plantations.

Coffee is mainly grown around the Blue Mountains and in hilly areas. One type in particular, Jamaican Blue Mountain Coffee, is considered among the best in the world because at those heights in the Blue Mountains, the cooler climate causes the berries to take longer to ripen and the beans develop more of the substances which on roasting give coffee its flavor. Coffee formed 1.9% of exports in 1999. The picking season lasts from August to March. The coffee is exported from Kingston.

Cocoa is grown throughout Jamaica and local sales absorb about 1/3 of the output to be made into instant drinks and confectionery. Citrus fruit is mainly grown in the central parts of Jamaica, particularly between the elevations of 1,000–2,500 feet. The picking season lasts from November to April. Two factories in Bog Walk produce fruit juices, canned fruit, essential oils and marmalade. Coconuts are grown on the northern and eastern coasts, which provide enough copra to supply factories to make butterine, margarine, lard, edible oil and laundry soap.

Vanilla is also grown.

Other export crops are pimento, ginger, tobacco, sisal and other fruit are exported. Rice is grown around swampy areas around the Black River & around Long Bay in Hanover and Westmoreland parishes for local consumption.

As tastes have changed in Jamaica in favour of more meat and packaged food the national food import bill has grown to the point that it threatens the health of the economy. The government has responded by encouraging gardening and farming, a response which has had limited success. For example, the percentage of potatoes grown locally has increased, but imports of french fries have continued at a high level.

=== Animal husbandry ===
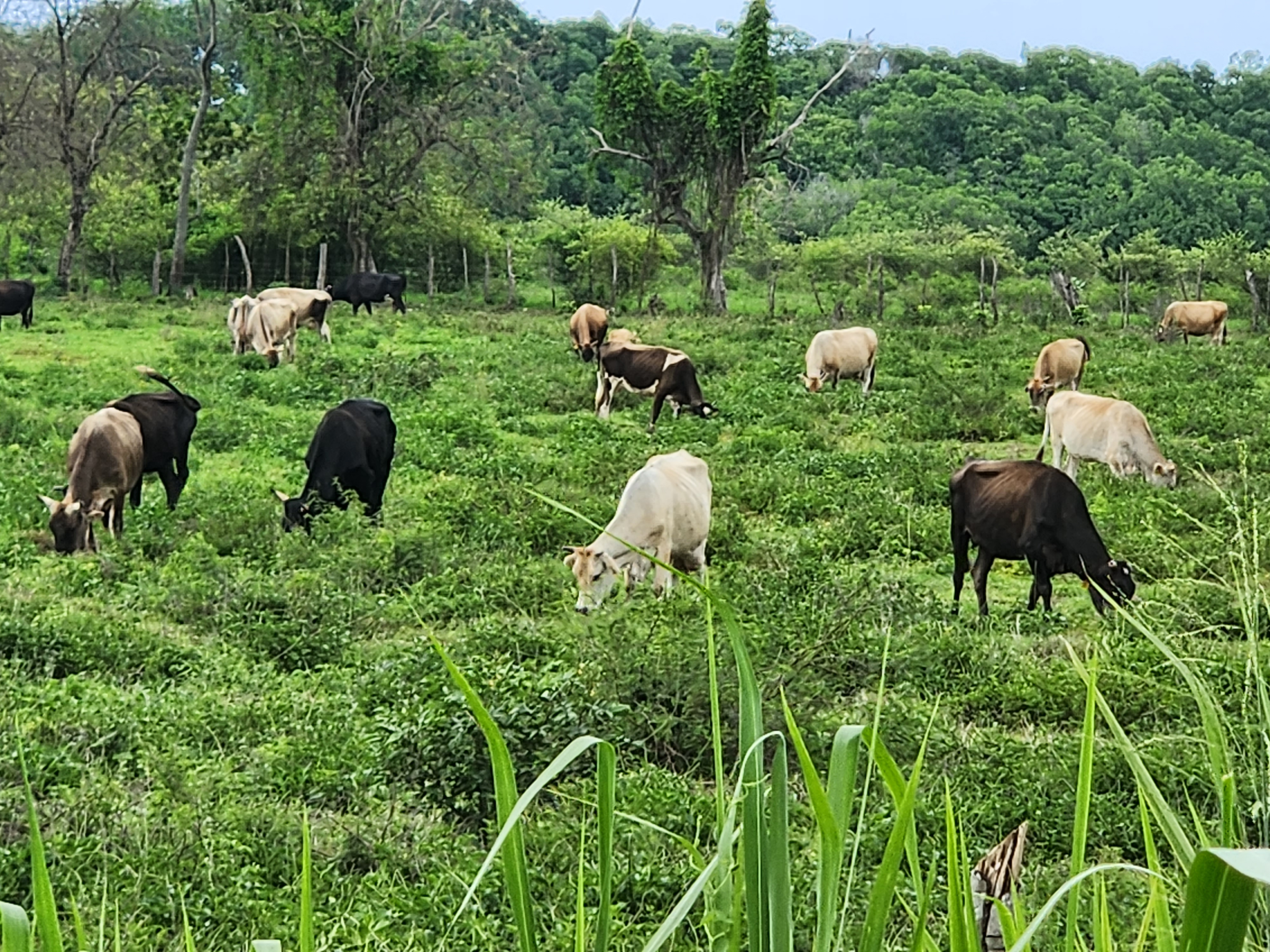
Cows Grazing, Saint Ann Parish 2023

Pastures form a good percentage of the land in Jamaica. Many properties specialise in cattle rearing. Livestock holdings include 400,000 head of cattle, 440,000 goats and 180,000 pigs. Dairying has increased since the erection of a condensed milk factory at Bog Walk in 1940. Even so, the supply of dairy products is not enough for local requirements and there are large imports of powdered milk, butter and cheese.

=== Fishing ===
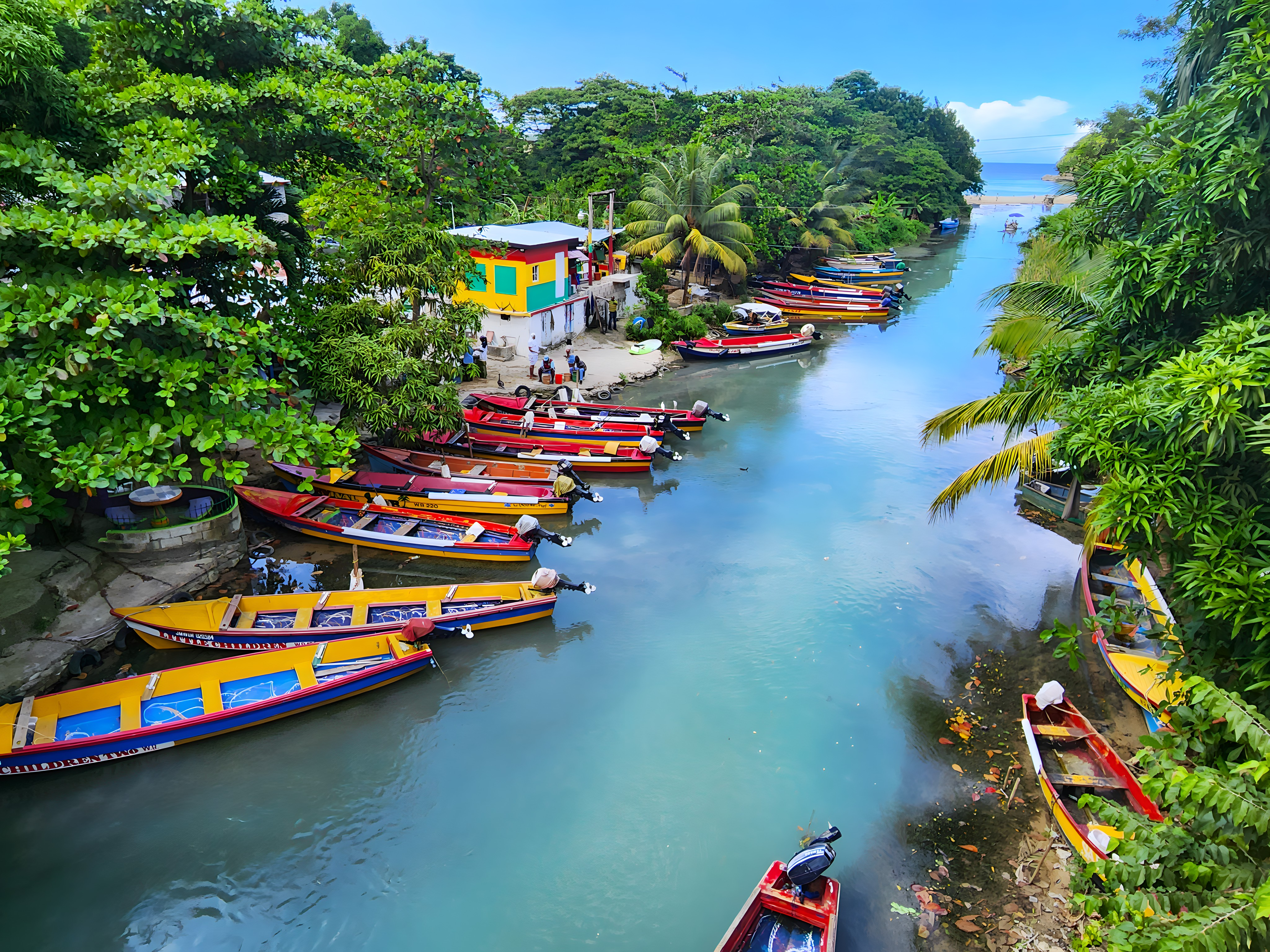
White River Fishing Village is in Ocho Rios, St. Ann

The fishing industry grew during the 1900s, primarily from the focus on inland fishing. Several thousand fishermen make a living from fishing. The shallow waters and cays off the south coast are richer than the northern waters. Other fishermen live on the Pedro Cays, 80 miles (130 km) to the south of Jamaica. Jamaica supplies about half of its fish requirements; major imports of frozen and salted fish are imported from the United States and Canada.

The total catch in 2000 was 5,676 tons, a decrease from 11,458 tons in 1997; the catch was mainly marine, with freshwater carp, barbel, etc., crustaceans & molluscs.

=== Forestry ===
By the late 1890, only 185,000 hectares (460,000 acres) of Jamaica's original 1,000,000 hectares (2,500,000 acres) of forest remained. Roundwood production was 881,000 cu m (31.1 million cu ft) in 2000. About 68% of the timber cut in 2000 was used as fuel wood while 32% was used for industrial use. The forests that once covered Jamaica now exist only in mountainous areas. They only supply 20% of the island timber requirements. The remaining forest is protected from further exploitation. Other accessible mountain areas are being reforested, mainly with pines, mahoe and mahogany.

=== Mining ===
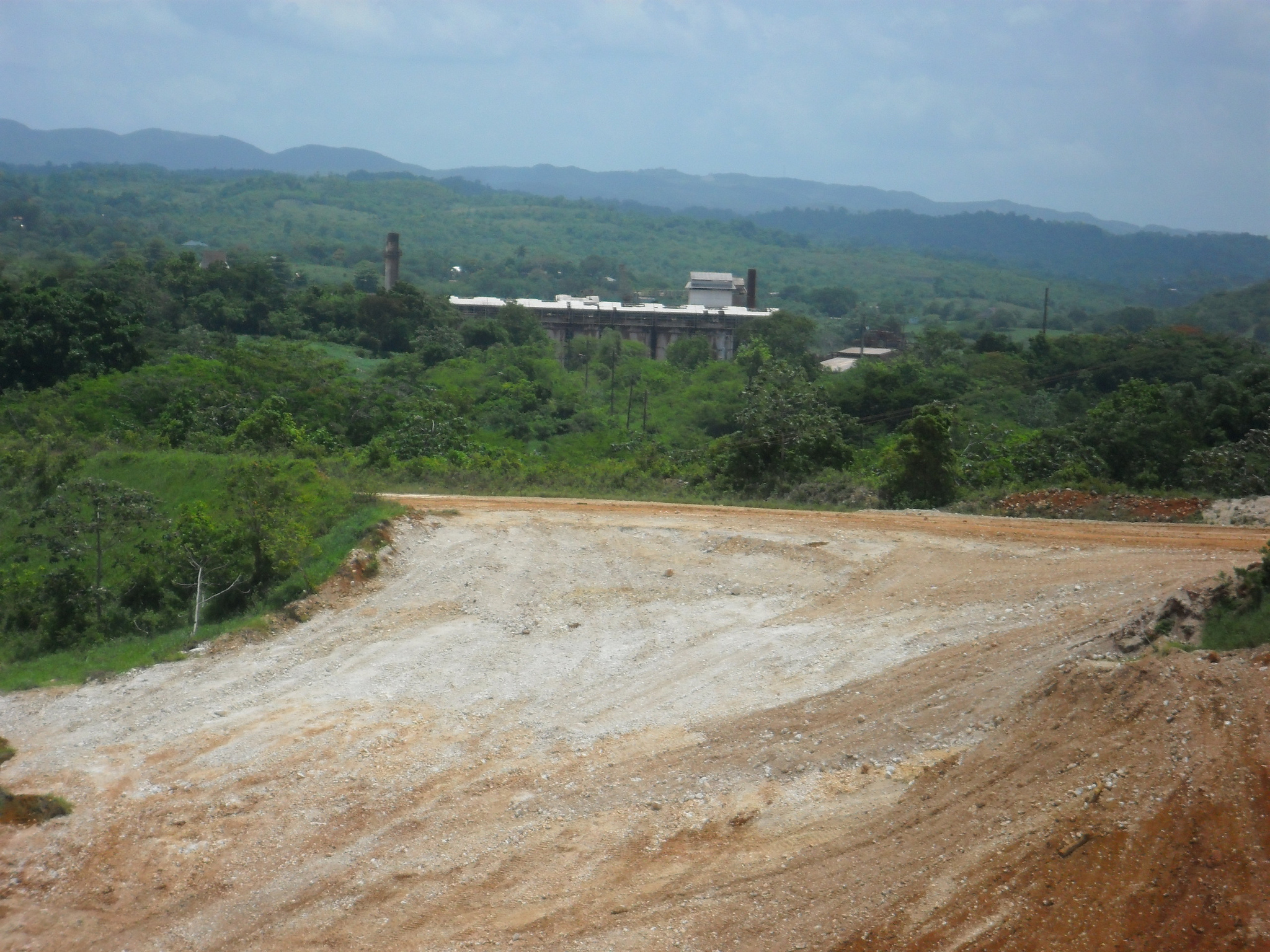
Windalco Alumina plant in the background (Kirkvine, Manchester)

Jamaica was the third-leading producer of bauxite and alumina in 1998, producing 12.6 million tons of bauxite, accounting for 10.4% of world production, and 3.46 million tons of alumina, accounting for 7.4% of world production. 8,540 million tons of bauxite was mined in 2012 and 10,200 million tons of bauxite in 2011.

Mining and quarrying made up 4.1% of the nation's gross domestic product in 1999. Bauxite and alumina formed 55.2% of exports in 1999 and are the second-leading money earner after tourism. Jamaica has reserves of over 2 billion tonnes, which are expected to last 100 years. Bauxite is found in the central parishes of St. Elizabeth, Manchester, Clarendon, St. Catherine, St. Ann, and Trelawny. There are four alumina plants and six mines.

Jamaica has deposits of several million tons of gypsum on the southern slopes of the Blue Mountains. Jamaica produced 330,441 tons of gypsum in the year 2000, some of which was used in the local cement industry and in the manufacturing of building materials.

Other minerals present in Jamaica include marble, limestone, and silica, as well as ores of copper, lead, zinc, manganese and iron. Some of these are worked in small quantities. Petroleum has been sought, but so far none has been found.

== Secondary Industries ==
=== Manufacturing ===
The manufacturing sector is an essential contributor to the Jamaican economy. Though manufacturing accounted for 13.9% of GDP in 1999. Jamaican companies contribute many manufactures such as food processing; oil refining; produced chemicals, construction materials, plastic goods, paints, pharmaceuticals, cartons, leather goods and cigars & assembled electronics, textiles and apparel. The garment industry is a major job employer for thousands of hundreds of locals and they formed 12.9% of exports in 1999 earning US$159 million. Chemicals formed 3.3% of the exports in 1999 earning US$40 million.

A portion of the bauxite mined on the island is processed into alumina before export.

An oil refinery is located near Kingston converts crude petroleum obtained from Venezuela into gasoline and other products. These are mainly for local use. The construction industry is growing due to new hotels and attractions being built for tourism. Construction and installation formed 10.4% of the GDP in 1999.

Manufactured goods were imported and formed 30.3% of the imports and cost US$877 million in 1999.

Since the launch of the Jamaican Logistics Hub initiative, various economic zones have been proposed throughout the country to assemble goods from other parts of the world for distribution to the Americas.

=== Petroleum industry ===
Petrojam, Jamaica's national and only petroleum refinery, is co-owned by the Government of Venezuela. Petrojam, "..operates a 35,000 barrel per day hydro-skimming refinery, to produce Automotive Diesel Oil; Heavy Fuel Oil; Kerosene/Jet Fuel, Liquid Petroleum Gas (LPG), Asphalt and Gasoline." Customers include the Power industry, Aircraft refuellers, and Local Marketing companies. On 20 February 2019, the Jamaican Government voted to retake ownership of Venezuela's 49% share.

== Tertiary industries ==
=== Education ===
Education in Jamaica is primarily modeled on the British education system.

The Human Rights Measurement Initiative (HRMI) finds that Jamaica is fulfilling only 70.0% of what it should be fulfilling for the right to education based on the country's level of income. HRMI breaks down the right to education by looking at the rights to both primary education and secondary education. While taking into consideration Jamaica's income level, the nation is achieving only 62.8% of what should be possible based on its resources (income) for primary education and 77.2% for secondary education.

=== Healthcare ===
Jamaica’s health care has had a weak history, however has been improving and continuing to improve. Part of this is from the fact that close to half of the healthcare workers from the area are leaving for the better opportunities that are offered elsewhere. The other cause comes from Jamaica’s history. Jamaica’s weak healthcare started back when Jamaica was still a colony that depended on enslaved people, and has been slowly improving ever since. Covid-19 and sickle cell have affected Jamaica heavily, but their statistics continue to improve. Jamaica has received help from various countries and corporations to improve their healthcare system.

=== Telecommunications ===
Telecommunications in Jamaica include radio, television, fixed and mobile telephony, and Internet services. The sector is regulated by the Office of Utilities Regulation (OUR) and the Spectrum Management Authority (SMA) under the Ministry of Science, Energy and Technology (MSET).

Jamaica’s telecom market is one of the most advanced in the Caribbean, with near-universal mobile coverage and growing broadband access. Liberalization in the early 2000s led to rapid expansion in mobile services, driven by Digicel Jamaica and Flow Jamaica (formerly LIME/Cable & Wireless).

=== Tourism ===
Tourism is tied with remittances as Jamaica's top source of revenue. The tourism industry earns over 50 per cent of the country's total foreign exchange earnings and provides about one-fourth of all jobs in Jamaica. Most tourist activity is centered on the island's northern coast, including the communities of Montego Bay, Ocho Rios, and Port Antonio, as well as in Negril on the island's western tip.

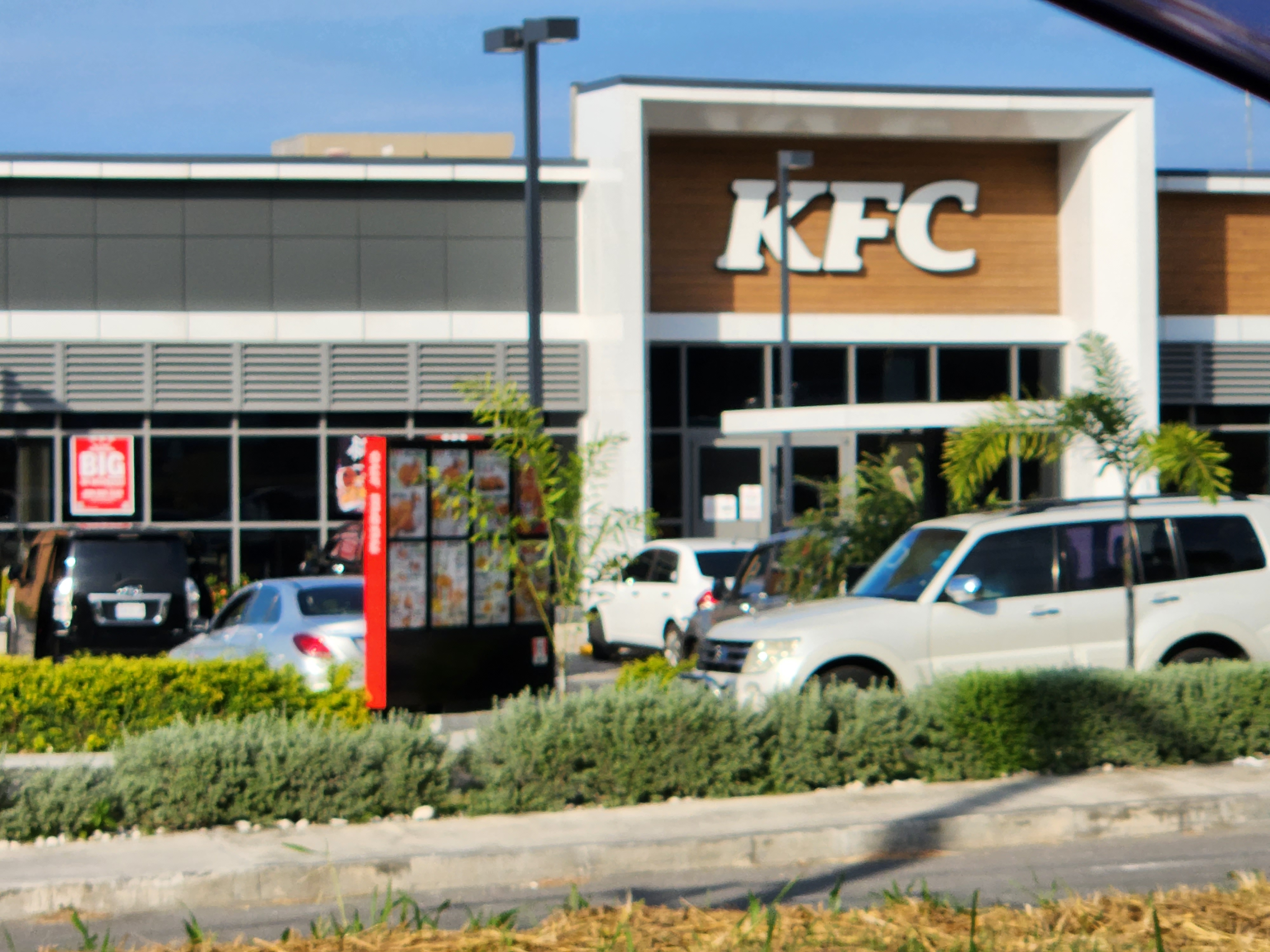
KFC Draxhall

Some destinations include Ocho Rios, Green Grotto Caves, Y.S. Falls and Appleton Estate. Most of the tourist sites are landmarks as well as homes for many Jamaicans. Many of the most frequented tourist sites are located mainly by water such as rivers and beaches where fishermen make a living from seafood. One of the most famous beach towns in Jamaica is Ocho Rios, a located in the parish of Saint Ann on the north coast of Jamaica. It was once a fishing village but now attracts millions of tourists yearly. The site is popular today because of the food and culture that can be found there.

Another famous location in Jamaica that attracts millions yearly is Dunn's River Falls, located in Ocho Rios; this waterfall is approximately 600 feet long and runs off into the sea. Around the location many hotels and restaurants are available and many street vendors sell food around the clock. Another well-known beach town is Negril, the party capital of the country. This beach town has many different factors to add to the night life.

=== Logistics ===
In April 2014, the Governments of Jamaica and China signed the preliminary agreements for the first phase of the Jamaican Logistics Hub (JLH) – the initiative that aims to position Kingston as the fourth node in the global logistics chain, joining Rotterdam, Dubai and Singapore, and serving the Americas. The Project, when completed, is expected to provide many jobs for Jamaicans, Economic Zones for multinational companies and much needed economic growth to alleviate the country's heavy debt-to-GDP ratio. Strict adherence to the IMF's refinancing programme and preparations for the JLH has favourably affected Jamaica's credit rating and outlook from the three biggest rating agencies.

=== ICT/BPO ===
Jamaica has made strides in developing its Information and Communications Technology (ICT) infrastructure.

As the largest English speaking territory in the Caribbean, Jamaica is the region's leading contact centre location with over 87 information communications technology/business process outsourcing (ICT/BPO) companies operating in the country employing 44,000 full-time agents.

== Infrastructure ==
=== Water supply and sanitation ===
Water supply and sanitation in Jamaica is characterized by high levels of access to an improved water source, while access to adequate sanitation stands at only 80%. This situation affects especially the poor, including the urban poor many of which live in the country's over 595 unplanned squatter settlements in unhealthy and unsanitary environments with a high risk of waterborne disease. Despite a number of policy papers that were mainly focused on water supply and despite various projects funded by external donors, increases in access have remained limited (1% for water and 5% for sanitation between 1990 and 2004).

The responsibility for water and sanitation policies within the government rests with the Ministry of Water and Housing, and the main service provider is the National Water Commission. An autonomous regulatory agency, the Office of Utilities Regulation, approves tariffs and establishes targets for efficiency increases.

=== Transport ===
Transport in Jamaica consists of roadways, railways, ship and air transport, with roadways forming the backbone of the island's internal transport system.

== Trade and investment ==
Exports of Jamaica by product category (2019) Chemical products Transportation Machines Mineral products Plastics and rubbers Metals Foodstuffs Precious metals Textiles Instruments Animal products Vegetable products Paper goods Footwear and headwear Miscellaneous Stone and glass Wood products Animal and vegetable bi-products Animal hides Arts and antiques Weapons

The Jamaican Free Zones are a government free trade zone initiative in Jamaica. Designed to encourage foreign investment and international trade, businesses operating within these zones have no tax on their profits, and are exempted from customs duties on imports and exports (capital goods, raw materials, construction materials, and office equipment) and import licensing requirements. They must export 85 percent of their products outside the Caribbean Community (CARICOM).

== Taxation/Tax Rates ==
Jamaican tax rates are extremely favourable in world standards, the brackets are as follows:

| Band | Personal Allowance (J$) | Tax Rate |
|---|---|---|
| 1 (Lower) -Up to | J$1,774,554 | 0% |
| 2 (Middle) – J$1,774,555-J$6,000,000 | J$1,774,554 | 25% |
| 3 (Upper) – J$6,000,000+ | J$1,774,554 | 30% |

Separate Tax Rates apply for foreign nationals.

== Economic Data ==
The following table shows the main economic indicators in 1980–2024. Inflation below 5% is in green.

| Year | GDP (in bil. US$ PPP) | GDP per capita (in US$ PPP) | GDP (in bil. US$ nominal) | GDP growth (real) | Inflation rate (in Percent) | Unemployment (in Percent) | Government debt (in % of GDP) |
|---|---|---|---|---|---|---|---|
| 1980 | 6.5 | 3,089 | 2.6 | ▼−4.0 | ▲18.0 | 27.3 | n/a |
| 1981 | ▲7.5 | ▲3,469 | ▲2.8 | ▲4.4 | ▲9.2 | ▼25.9 | n/a |
| 1982 | ▲8.2 | ▲3,733 | ▲3.2 | ▲3.1 | ▲6.8 | ▲27.6 | n/a |
| 1983 | ▲8.8 | ▲3,961 | ▼2.9 | ▲4.2 | ▲16.7 | ▼26.4 | n/a |
| 1984 | ▲9.2 | ▲4,134 | ▼2.1 | ▲1.0 | ▲31.3 | ▼25.5 | n/a |
| 1985 | ▲9.4 | ▲4163 | ▼2.0 | ▼−0.9 | ▲29.7 | ▼25.0 | n/a |
| 1986 | ▲10.3 | ▲4,504 | ▲2.4 | ▲7.0 | ▲24.4 | ▼23.7 | n/a |
| 1987 | ▲11.4 | ▲4,935 | ▲2.7 | ▲7.7 | ▲11.2 | ▼21.0 | n/a |
| 1988 | ▼11.3 | ▼4,876 | ▲3.2 | ▼−4.0 | ▲8.2 | ▼19.1 | n/a |
| 1989 | ▲12.3 | ▲5,295 | ▲3.7 | ▲4.7 | ▲16.1 | ▼15.2 | n/a |
| 1990 | ▲13.4 | ▲5,662 | ▲4.7 | ▲4.9 | ▲24.8 | ▲15.7 | n/a |
| 1991 | ▲14.0 | ▲5,863 | ▼4.3 | ▲0.8 | ▲51.0 | ▼15.4 | n/a |
| 1992 | ▲14.7 | ▲6,117 | 4.3 | ▲2.8 | ▲77.3 | ▲15.7 | n/a |
| 1993 | ▲15.4 | ▲6,348 | ▲5.4 | ▲2.2 | ▲21.6 | ▲16.3 | n/a |
| 1994 | ▲16.0 | ▲6,548 | ▲5.5 | ▲1.9 | ▲35.5 | ▼15.4 | n/a |
| 1995 | ▲16.7 | ▲6,792 | ▲6.5 | ▲2.5 | ▲19.9 | ▲16.2 | n/a |
| 1996 | ▲17.1 | ▲6,868 | ▲7.4 | ▲0.2 | ▲26.4 | ▼16.0 | n/a |
| 1997 | ▼17.1 | ▼6,805 | ▲8.4 | ▼−1.6 | ▲9.7 | ▲16.5 | n/a |
| 1998 | 17.1 | ▼6,732 | ▲8.8 | ▼−1.2 | ▲8.6 | ▼15.5 | n/a |
| 1999 | ▲17.5 | ▲6,829 | ▲8.9 | ▲1.0 | ▲6.0 | ▲15.7 | 82.7 |
| 2000 | ▲18.0 | ▲6,973 | ▲9.1 | ▲0.8 | ▲8.1 | ▼15.5 | ▲91.8 |
| 2001 | ▲18.6 | ▲7,158 | ▲9.2 | ▲1.3 | ▲6.9 | ▼15.0 | ▲108.0 |
| 2002 | ▲19.1 | ▲7,277 | ▲9.7 | ▲0.7 | ▲7.0 | ▼14.2 | ▲118.4 |
| 2003 | ▲20.2 | ▲7,665 | ▼9.4 | ▲3.7 | ▲10.1 | ▼11.8 | ▲123.2 |
| 2004 | ▲21.0 | ▲7,947 | ▲10.2 | ▲1.3 | ▲13.5 | ▲12.2 | ▼119.9 |
| 2005 | ▲21.8 | ▲8,239 | ▲11.2 | ▲0.9 | ▲15.1 | ▼11.2 | ▲124.7 |
| 2006 | ▲23.1 | ▲8,709 | ▲11.9 | ▲2.9 | ▲8.5 | ▼10.3 | ▼117.1 |
| 2007 | ▲24.1 | ▲9,042 | ▲12.9 | ▲1.4 | ▲9.3 | ▼9.9 | ▼114.5 |
| 2008 | ▲24.4 | ▲9,108 | ▲13.7 | ▼−0.8 | ▲22.0 | ▲10.6 | ▲127.0 |
| 2009 | ▼23.7 | ▼8,821 | ▼12.1 | ▼−3.4 | ▲9.6 | ▲11.4 | ▲141.9 |
| 2010 | ▼23.6 | ▼8,769 | ▲13.2 | ▼−1.4 | ▲12.6 | ▲12.4 | ▼141.4 |
| 2011 | ▲24.5 | ▲9,053 | ▲14.4 | ▲1.4 | ▲7.5 | 12.4 | ▼139.5 |
| 2012 | ▲24.8 | ▲9,151 | ▲14.8 | ▼−0.5 | ▲6.9 | ▲13.9 | ▲143.9 |
| 2013 | ▲25.3 | ▲9,316 | ▼14.2 | ▲0.2 | ▲9.4 | ▲15.3 | ▼138.7 |
| 2014 | ▲25.9 | ▲9,525 | ▼13.9 | ▲0.6 | ▲8.3 | ▼13.8 | ▼137.9 |
| 2015 | ▲26.3 | ▲9,683 | ▲14.2 | ▲0.9 | ▲3.7 | ▼13.5 | ▼121.9 |
| 2016 | ▲27.0 | ▲9,914 | ▼14.1 | ▲1.5 | ▲2.4 | ▼13.2 | ▼113.7 |
| 2017 | ▲27.7 | ▲10,144 | ▲14.8 | ▲0.7 | ▲4.4 | ▼11.7 | ▼101.2 |
| 2018 | ▲28.3 | ▲10,363 | ▲15.6 | ▲1.8 | ▲3.7 | ▼9.1 | ▼94.4 |
| 2019 | ▲28.5 | ▲10,412 | ▲15.8 | ▲1.0 | ▲3.9 | ▼7.7 | ▼94.3 |
| 2020 | ▼25.5 | ▼9,298 | ▼13.9 | ▼−9.9 | ▲5.2 | ▲10.2 | ▲109.7 |
| 2021 | ▲27.2 | ▲9,917 | ▲14.7 | ▲4.6 | ▲5.9 | ▼8.4 | ▼94.2 |
| 2022 | ▲30.6 | ▲11,167 | ▲17.0 | ▲5.2 | ▲10.3 | ▼6.3 | ▼77.0 |
| 2023 | ▲32.6 | ▲11,856 | ▲19.3 | ▲2.6 | ▲6.5 | ▼4.4 | ▼73.3 |
| 2024 | ▲33.8 | ▲12,283 | ▲20.6 | ▲1.3 | ▲5.8 | n/a | ▼67.9 |

== See also ==
- List of companies of Jamaica
- Climate finance in Jamaica
- Jamaica and the International Monetary Fund
- Jamaica and the World Bank
- Science and technology in Jamaica
- Bank of Jamaica
- Ministry of Economic Growth and Job Creation
- Ministry of Foreign Affairs and Foreign Trade (Jamaica)
- Ministry of Labour and Social Security (Jamaica)
- Economy of the Caribbean
