= Maryse Alberti =

French cinematographer

- Born: Langon, France
- Occupation: Cinematographer

Maryse Alberti is a French cinematographer who mainly works in the United States on independent fiction films and vérité, observational documentaries. Alberti has won awards from the Sundance Film Festival and the Spirit Awards. She was the first contemporary female cinematographer featured on the cover of American Cinematographer for her work on the Todd Haynes-directed Velvet Goldmine (1998). She is also known for her work on Darren Aronofsky's 2008 wrestling drama, The Wrestler, and the 2018 HBO film My Dinner with Hervé.

== Early life ==
Maryse Alberti was born in Langon, France. At the age of 19 in 1973, Alberti travelled to New York City planning to see Jimi Hendrix in concert, but only discovered of his death after her arrival. Instead of returning to France, she hitchhiked around the US for three years before she settled in New York City. There, she began a job as an au pair before turning to film.

She did not attend film school.

== Career ==
Alberti first landed in the film industry as a still photographer for porn films. In 1982, after having worked on enough film sets and getting to know people within the industry, she persuaded the filmmakers of the small punk film-noir film Vortex (1982) to let her be an assistant to the cinematographer. At the time, she had known nothing about film-making and was trained by the film's cinematographer, Steven Fierberg.

Alberti began her cinematography career working for the film company, Apparatus, run by short-film director Christine Vachon. The first full-length documentary she shot was Stephanie Black's H-2 Worker (1990). She won her first Sundance Film Festival award as a cinematographer for this film. She secured her career after being hired for Todd Haynes' controversial pseudo-documentary feature film Poison (1991).

She is most well-known for shooting both feature films and small 16mm documentaries- her favourite camera being an Aaton 16 mm camera. She has said that her favourite genre of film is documentary because she finds there is "always an adventure [and] a lesson" with this medium and she enjoys learning how to use simple tools and work with small groups of people.

Alberti's first big-budget film was Haynes' Velvet Goldmine (1998) with a budget of $8 million. This was also the first time she used a camera operator.

In June 2006, Alberti travelled to Germany to film portions of the FIFA World Cup for scenes to be shown in Michael Apted's soccer documentary The Power of the Game (2007).

Other work includes Darren Aronofsky's 2008 wrestling drama, The Wrestler, starring Mickey Rourke. Aronofsky hired Alberti as the cinematographer due to her documentary background. Prior to working on this film, Alberti had no knowledge or experience with wrestling, so she would study the sport by attending wrestling matches with members of the crew every Saturday night for a period of time. She revealed that viewing the sport in person was helpful to see the world of wrestling. The director and she decided on a "naturalist look"; her aim was to "make [the film style] work for the drama of the film and keep it as natural as possible" in order to let the viewer feel like they were in a "real [wrestling] place". Important film elements, styles, and techniques were decided between Alberti and the director including an aspect ratio of 2.4:1 in order to capture the wrestling ring, fans, and the arena which they decided were very valuable to the sport. Alberti also used a handheld camera for the action scenes and shot in 16mm film to, as she states in an interview with MovieMaker, "[embrace] a slightly grainy, edgier look". She used an Arriflex 416 camera and Kodak Vision3 500T colour negative film 7219.

In 2013, Alberti's photography series called The Pool Series was featured in the Show Room gallery in Brooklyn, New York.

== Practice ==
Alberti has stated that she could not see what she was photographing and could "only anticipate what the next fragment of time might look like" and thus aimed to create an "artistic anticipation".

Alberti has said that being a woman in a male-dominated field of work has not hindered her career and success. In an interview with the Los Angeles Times, she mentions that in the beginning of her career, crew members would tease her for being a petite woman working a physically demanding job. In response, she would reply with "The little lady doesn't carry the big lights. She points and the big guys carry the lights".

== Awards and nominations ==
- 1990 Sundance Film Festival Excellence in Cinematography Award Documentary - H-2 Worker (1990)
- 1995 Sundance Film Festival Excellence in Cinematography Award Documentary- Crumb (1994)
- 1999 Independent Spirit Award Best Cinematography- Velvet Goldmine (1998)
- 2004 Independent Spirit Award - We Don't Live Here Anymore (2004)
- 2006 Women in Film Crystal + Lucy Awards Kodak Vision Award
- 2006 Primetime Emmy Award nomination for Cinematography for Nonfiction Programming (Single Camera)- All Aboard! Rosie's Family Cruise (2006)
- 2009 Independent Spirit Award Best Cinematography- The Wrestler (2008)

== Filmography ==
=== Short film ===
Year	Title	Director	Notes
1988	Cause and Effect	Susan Delson	
1989	The Way of the Wicked	Christine Vachon	
1996	The Dutch Master	Susan Seidelman	Segment of Tales of Erotica
1996	Dear Diary	David Frankel	
2001	Here	Brendan Donovan	
2002	Gasp	Brendan Donovan	
2005	Hidden Inside Mountains	Laurie Anderson	
2006	A Journey That Wasn't	Pierre Huyghe	
2016	Mr. Robot Virtual Reality Experience	Sam Esmail	

=== Feature film ===
Year	Title	Director	Notes
1990	The Golden Boat	Raúl Ruiz	
1991	Poison	Todd Haynes	
1992	Zebrahead	Anthony Drazan	
1993	I Am a Sex Addict	Vikram Jayanti; John Powers	
1993	Deadfall	Christopher Coppola	
1993	Mob Stories	Marc Levin	
1995	Give a Damn Again	Adam Isidore	With Robert Levi and Kramer Morgenthau
1996	I Love You, I Love You Not	Billy Hopkins	
1997	Stag	Gavin Wilding	
1998	Happiness	Todd Solondz	
1998	Velvet Goldmine	Todd Haynes	
2000	Joe Gould's Secret	Stanley Tucci	
2000	Twilight: Los Angeles	Marc Levin	With Joan Churchill
2001	Tape	Richard Linklater	
2001	Get Over It	Tommy O'Haver	
2002	The Guys	Jim Simpson	
2004	We Don't Live Here Anymore	John Curran	
2008	The Onion Movie	James Kleiner	
2008	The Wrestler	Darren Aronofsky	
2010	Stone	John Curran	
2010	QC Notorious	Robert Agro-Melina	
2015	The Visit	M. Night Shyamalan	
2015	Freeheld	Peter Sollett	
2015	Creed	Ryan Coogler	
2016	Collateral Beauty	David Frankel	
2017	Chappaquiddick	John Curran	
2019	The Kitchen	Andrea Berloff	
2020	Hillbilly Elegy	Ron Howard	
2021	A Journal for Jordan	Denzel Washington	
2022	Jerry & Marge Go Large	David Frankel	
2023	The Burial	Maggie Betts	

=== Television ===
Year	Title	Director	Notes
1988	American Playhouse	Calvin Skaggs	Episode "Journey Into Genius"
1998	Sex and the City	Alison Maclean	Episodes "Models and Mortals" and "Valley of the Twenty-Something Guys"
2006	Great Performances	Phil Bertelsen	Episode "Dance in America: Beyond the Steps - Alvin Ailey American Dance Theater"
2022	Inventing Anna	David Frankel; Tom Verica	Episodes "Life of a VIP" and "The Devil Wore Anna" (With David Franco)

==== TV movies ====
Year	Title	Director
1993	Dottie Gets Spanked	Todd Haynes
2018	My Dinner with Hervé	Sacha Gervasi

=== Documentary works ===
==== Film ====
Year	Title	Director	Notes
1990	H-2 Worker	Stephanie Black	With Tom Sigel
1991	All Our Children with Bill Moyers	Tom Casciato	
1992	Incident at Oglala	Michael Apted	
1992	Confessions of a Suburban Girl	Susan Seidelman	
1992	In Women's Hands	Rachel Field; Juan Mandelbaum	
1994	The Heart of the Matter	Amber Hollibaugh; Gini Reticker	
1994	Moving the Mountain	Michael Apted	
1995	Crumb	Terry Zwigoff	
1995	She Lives to Ride	Alice Stone	
1995	Harlem Diary: Nine Voices of Resilience	Jonathan Stack	
1996	When We Were Kings	Leon Gast	With Paul Goldsmith, Kevin Keating, Albert Maysles and Roderick Young
1997	Inspirations	Michael Apted	With Amnon Zlayet
1999	Me & Isaac Newton	Michael Apted	
2001	James Ellroy's Feast of Death	Vikram Jayanti	
2003	Game Over: Kasparov and the Machine	Vikram Jayanti	
2007	Taxi to the Dark Side	Alex Gibney	With Greg Andracke
2007	The Power of the Game	Michael Apted	
2008	Gonzo: The Life and Work of Dr. Hunter S. Thompson	Alex Gibney	
2008	Finishing Heaven	Mark Mann	With Liz Dory and Boaz Freund
2008	The Agony and Ecstasy of Phil Spector	Vikram Jayanti	
2010	Casino Jack and the United States of Money	Alex Gibney	
2010	My Trip to Al-Qaeda	Alex Gibney	
2010	Client 9: The Rise and Fall of Eliot Spitzer	Alex Gibney	
2011	Apache 8	Sande Zeig	
2011	Biba! One Island, 879 Votes	Ben Bloodwell	
2012	West of Memphis	Amy J. Berg	With Ronan Killeen
2012	Love, Marilyn	Liz Garbus	
2012	Dear Governor Cuomo	Jon Bowermaster; Alex Gibney; Natalie Merchant	With Ronan Killeen
2013	We Steal Secrets: The Story of WikiLeaks	Alex Gibney	
2014	Bending the Light	Michael Apted	
2014	Mr. Dynemite: The Rise of James Brown	Alex Gibney	With Antonio Rossi
