= Jamaica Society of Energy Engineers =

Public nonprofit energy resources organization in Jamaica

The Jamaica Society of Energy Engineers (JSEE) is a newly formed public non-profit organization with a mandate to promote the conscientious utilization of energy resources in Jamaica. The JSEE formation was initially spurred by the need for a professional entity to provide and oversee local training and certification of Energy Auditors and Managers. The JSEE is now a chapter of the Association of Energy Engineers (AEE), which is the world-wide certifying body for all energy engineers.

== Formation ==
The formation of the society was spearheaded by the Computing and Engineering Entrepreneurial Centre, at the University of Technology (UTech) and was officially launched at the Technology Innovation Centre, UTech on 27 February 2009.

The society's objectives are to promote energy matters in organizations, corporate with industries and organizations to provide energy solutions, certify energy professionals and provide career guidance for students at the secondary and tertiary levels.

== Background ==
As part of the Government of Jamaica’s (GOJ) expressed desire to promote the implementation of energy efficiency and conservation practices, the GOJ through the Development Bank of Jamaica (DBJ) made available J$1 Billion to be lent to Small and Medium Size Enterprises (SME’s). The Project named the “DBJ-PetroCaribe Energy Line of Credit for SME” will be distributed by Approved Financial Institutions (AFIs) (Commercial Banks, Credit Unions and P.C. Banks) to SME members after completing an Energy Audit done by an approved Auditor from the Petroleum Corporation of Jamaica.

The University of Technology, Jamaica was invited to be a partner in the project to establish the Jamaica Society of Energy Engineers and to train persons as Certified Energy Managers expected to do the audits on the SME. The other members of the partnership are Development Bank of Jamaica (DBJ), Jamaica Trade and Invest (JTI), and Petroleum Corporation of Jamaica (PCJ).
