= H-2 Worker =

- Directed by: Stephanie Black
- Produced by: Stephanie Black
- Cinematography: Maryse Alberti
- Edited by: John Mullen
- Music by: Various, including "H-2 Worka" by Mutabaruka
- Distributed by: New Video
- Release date: 1990
- Running time: 67 min
- Country: United States
- Language: English

H-2 Worker is a 1990 documentary film about the exploitation of Jamaican guest workers in Florida's sugar cane industry. It was directed by Stephanie Black, and won the Sundance Film Festival Grand Jury Prize for documentaries in the 1990 festival. It was shot in Belle Glade, Clewiston, and Okeelanta, Florida, as well as Jamaica and includes cane fields and worker camps (Ritta Village, Prewitt Village) owned by US Sugar Corporation and the Okeelanta Corporation.

The cane harvesters were brought in to perform the autumn harvest of sugar cane under the H-2A visa program. The Jamaicans replaced earlier generations of Bahamian seasonal workers who in turn replaced migrant labor recruited from the Cotton Belt in the first half of the 20th century. A documentary short that accompanies the DVD version of the film states that human labor was abandoned for mechanical harvesters in 1992.

The film features interviews with a United States Department of Labor official, a Florida Sugar Cane League official, Jamaican Prime Minister Michael Manley, local merchants, and a dozen or so field workers. It also includes footage of César Chávez, US Representative Thomas Downey, and US Senator Bill Bradley.

Awards
Preceded by For All Mankind	Sundance Grand Jury Prize: Documentary; 1990	Succeeded by American Dream
