= PCJ =

PCJ may refer to:

- Gorum language of India (ISO 639-3 code: pcj)
- PCJJ, Netherlands-based radio station, broadcast 1927 to 1947
- Petroleum Corporation of Jamaica
- Puran Chand Joshi (1907–1980), early communist leader in India
