= The Power of the Game =

- Directed by: Michael Apted
- Produced by: Benjamin Goldhirsh; Eileen Gregory; Peter Hargitay; Stevie Hargitay; Matt Littin
- Cinematography: Maryse Alberti
- Edited by: Susanne Rostock
- Music by: Carmen Rizzo
- Production companies: Channel Four Television Corporation; Film4; Hargitay & Hargitay Pictures in Motion; National Geographic Films; Pathé Pictures International; Reason Pictures
- Distributed by: Pathé
- Release date: 2007
- Running time: 100 minutes
- Country: United States
- Language: English

The Power of the Game is a 2007 documentary directed by Michael Apted. The film shows several stories across the world highlighting the social impact of soccer. The film premiered at the 2007 Tribeca Film Festival.
