= Melanin Man =

Studio album by Mutabaruka
- Released: 1994
- Genre: Dub poetry
- Label: Shanachie
- Producers: Mutabaruka, Gussie Clarke, Philip "Fatis" Burrell

Mutabaruka chronology
Blakk Wi Blak...K...K... (1991)	Melanin Man (1994)	Gathering of the Spirits (1998)

Melanin Man is an album by the Jamaican musician Mutabaruka, released in 1994. Mutabaruka supported the album with a North American tour that included shows with Speech. "Bone Lie" was a hit in Jamaica.

== Production ==
The album was produced by Mutabaruka, Gussie Clarke, and Philip "Fatis" Burrell. Sly and Robbie played on Melanin Man; Dennis Brown, Cocoa Tea, and Freddie McGregor sang on the album.

The title track alludes to the pseudoscientific theory; it was also considered a black pride anthem. "Beware" offers advice to Nelson Mandela. "Miss Lou" is addressed to Louise Bennett-Coverley.

== Critical reception ==
Professional ratings
Review scores
Source	Rating
AllMusic	4/5 stars
MusicHound World: The Essential Album Guide	4/5 stars

The Washington Post opined that "the unimaginative, mechanical dancehall rhythms and dub echoes pander to all the worst musical stereotypes and Mutabaruka's verse is all strident polemics full of abstract nouns with none of the sensual imagery and fresh metaphor of such musical Caribbean poets as Bob Marley and Shinehead." The Chicago Tribune admired the "squirmy licks, driving guitar and traditional Rastafarian chants" of "Beware". The San Antonio Express-News determined that Melanin Man "plays almost like a reggae/poetry opera."

The Gazette called the album "surely the most powerful release to date by Jamaica's most powerful dub poet." The Hamilton Spectator noted that "it's not all doom and gloom, as the album-ending 'Dance' testifies, but it is sober and serious stuff." The Times Colonist praised "the rollicking, church-indicting, ska-conked 'People's Court II'." The St. Paul Pioneer Press listed Melanin Man among the best albums of 1994.

AllMusic wrote that most of the songs "continue his tradition of unrelenting, pro-Jamaican, pan-African political fare."

== Track listing ==
No.	Title	Length
1.	"Melanin Man"
2.	"Beware"
3.	"Garvey"
4.	"Killin"
5.	"Bone Lie"
6.	"Miss Lou"
7.	"Lamentation"
8.	"Columbus Ghost"
9.	"People's Court Part II"
10.	"Haiti"
11.	"Dance"
