= Dear Diary (1996 special) =

1996 short film by David Frankel

- Directed by: David Frankel
- Written by: David Frankel
- Produced by: David Frankel; Barry Jossen
- Starring: Bebe Neuwirth; Bruce Altman
- Cinematography: Maryse Alberti
- Edited by: Michael Berenbaum
- Production company: DreamWorks Television
- Distributed by: American Broadcasting Company
- Release date: 1996
- Running time: 22 minutes
- Country: United States
- Language: English

Dear Diary is a TV pilot, starring Bebe Neuwirth, written and directed by David Frankel and produced by Frankel and Barry Jossen. After being rejected by ABC, it was slightly edited and put into a single Los Angeles theater for a weekend in November 1996, and went on to win an Oscar for Best Live Action Short Film at the 69th Academy Awards. It was the only made-for-TV pilot ever to win an Oscar.

== Plot ==
The film revolves around a New York magazine art director, married and the mother of two, who, having just turned 40, decides to record the events of her day in a journal.

== Cast ==
- Bruce Altman as Griffin
- Bebe Neuwirth as Annie
- Brian Kerwin as Tom
- Rhea Silver-Smith as Sara
- Peter Brown as Peter
- Cheryl Freeman as Elizabeth
- Lisa Louise Langford as Stacey
- Haviland Morris as Christie
- Mike Starr as Fritz
- Ronald Guttman as Erik
- Jeff Blumenkrantz as Ron
- Peter Jacobson as Hal
- Peter Vack as Peter
- Peter Giles as Gary
