= Jamaica and the World Bank =

Jamaica first joined The World Bank Group (WBG) on 21 February 1963, when the island nation became a member of The International Bank for Reconstruction and Development (IBRD), which lends to middle and low income nations. This occurred the same month as Jamaica joining the International Monetary Fund (IMF), and one year after declaring political independence. Since joining The World Bank, Jamaica has received in excess of $3 billion US Dollars in loans and grants. Jamaican Minister of Finance, Donald Sangster, led the Jamaican delegations to World Bank and International monetary Fund meetings between 1963 and 1966, while also serving as Governor of the World Bank and IMF. Sangster would go on to serve briefly as the Prime Minister of Jamaica.

By the end of 1988, Jamaica would join every agency within The World Bank Group except for the International development Association (IDA), the agency that provides interest free loans and grants to underdeveloped nations. As of December 2019, The World Bank has completed 91 project in Jamaica, with 10 additional projects currently active, project still pending approval. Jamaica and The World Bank have worked together to get out of the trend of low growth and high debt, a dangerous combination. These condition have resulted in high interest payments that have taken a toll on state budgets. Together that have developed a program that focuses on three strategic areas: "(i) public sector modernization; (ii) enabling environment for private sector growth; and (iii) social and climate resilience.". Since 2019, Jamaica and the World Bank have embarked on an aggressive reform project, which has included The World Bank providing upwards of $500 million US dollars towards development effort in Jamaica.

== Voting power ==
Jamaica has different levels of voting power for different agencies within the World Bank Group.

Jamaica's Voting Power Within The World Bank Group (2019)
	Total Subscription Amount	Percent of Total Subscriptions	Number of Votes	Percent of total votes
International Bank for Reconstruction and Development (IBRD)	336.1	0.14	4,092	0.16
International Finance Corporation (IFC)	4,282	0.17	5,097	0.19
International Development Association (IDA) (Not a member)	0	0	0	0
Multilateral Investment Guarantee Agency (MIGA)	3.19	0.18	545	0.25

Jamaica's Constituencies (2019)
	Constituency	Constituency Total Number of Votes	Constituency Percent of Total Votes
International Bank for Reconstruction and Development (IBRD)	Canada	99,185	3.99
International Finance Corporation (IFC)	Canada	99,724	3.67
International Development Association (IDA) (Not a member)	N/A	0	0
Multilateral Investment Guarantee Agency (MIGA)	Canada	9,976	4.57

== Brief History of the Jamaican Economy ==
Map of Jamaica

=== Pre Independence Economy ===
Jamaica was discovered by Christopher Columbus in 1492. This island would later be transformed into a Spanish colony, run using black slave labor. In 1655 the island was seized by the English, under the command of Oliver Cromwell. The English would set up a plantation economy that produced sugar, cocoa, and coffee. During this period, little economic development occurred as "surpluses available for investment were all transferred abroad (to Europe)." In 1834, Jamaica's slaves were freed, and many would become farmers. The Great Depression affected Jamaica severely, causing instability and revolts. The English responded by increasing access land and other resources, and by attracting foreign investment. Between 1950 and 1960 Jamaica experienced high rates of economic growth, due in large part to the growth of the Bauxite mining sector, which went from nonexistent to accounting for over 8% of GDP during the 10-year period.

=== Post Independence Economy ===
Jamaica declared independence August 6, 1962, withdrawing from The Federation of the West Indies, and established a parliamentary democracy centered in the capital of Kingston. After independence, the Jamaican economy was heavily regulated, with many price ceilings. additionally, the Jamaican currency, the Jamaican Dollar, had an artificial exchange rate that was overvalued. The process of structural adjustment reforms (SAPs) began in the mid-1980s, and included financial liberalization, freeing of the foreign exchange market, general marketization. These changes induced price volatility which was later stabilized in the 1990s alongside a policy of reducing the debt-to-GDP ratio.

It is believed that approximately 40% of the total GDP output of Jamaica today is within the informal markets. Several economist have voiced concern over this, arguing that an increase in the size of the informal economy can lead to a decline in economic growth. Today Jamaica has a population of 2.8 million individuals (2018), a GNI per capita of $4,990 (2018), and a lower inequality rate than most nations in Latin America. The current GDP is 15.71 billion US Dollars, making Jamaica one of the largest economies in the Caribbean. The economy of Jamaica consists mostly of a service sector, contributing over 70% of the GDP. Tourism accounts for 20% of GDP, and remittances accounts for 14%. The Jamaican economy has suffered from poor overall growth in the past several decades, averaging less than 1% growth annually over the past 30 years. Some of the causes of slow growth in Jamaica are a disproportionately large public sector, high crime levels, endemic corruption, strict regulation, poor judicial effectiveness, a high debt-to-GDP ratio, and high levels of unemployment. The economy of Jamaica is highly susceptible to fluctuations in weather condition, especially hurricanes (See list of Hurricanes in Jamaica). However, after implementing economic reforms as part of program supported by the International Monetary Fund (IMF), The World Bank Group and the Inter-American Development bank (IADB), economic stability was established, and Jamaica has achieved 16 consecutive quarters of growth.

==== 2018 Economic Assessment ====
The economic reforms that began in 2013 have been a turning point in the Jamaican economy. Broadly supported, these reforms have demonstrated over the course of two administrations fiscal discipline, and support for both monetary and financial reforms. The wide-ranging structural reforms have broken decades of high debt and low growth in Jamaica. Furthermore, progress has been made on macroeconomic policy. Jamaica has passed the Fiscal Responsibility Law, placing a floor on the overall fiscal balance. The report notes, "Employment is at historic highs, inflation and the current account deficit are modest, international reserves are at a comfortable level, and external borrowing costs are at historical lows." However, the economy of Jamaica still exhibits worrying signs. Both growth and social outcomes have failed to respond strongly to reforms. The IMF noted, "structural obstacles, including crime, bureaucratic processes, insufficient labor force skills, and poor access to finance, continue to hinder productivity and growth. Moreover, the agricultural sector's vulnerability to weather shocks exacerbated rural poverty in 2015."

== Years of cooperation ==
In the 1960s Jamaica experienced several years of growth. During this time The World Bank provided Jamaica with loan agreements which supported a number of development projects. In 1965 The World Bank provided Jamaica with loans that supported the construction that expanded a road from Kingston to Spanish Town. The Road, when finished, was a four lane highway which improved transportation on the island. In 1966 loans were provided that allowed for the construction of secondary schools, teacher training programs, the Jamaica School of Agriculture, and the expansion of the University of Technology. In 1967 Jamaica was able to expand and improve the Jamaica Telephone Company's network services thanks to loans provided by the World Bank.

During the 1970s Jamaica and the World Bank continued to work together. In 1971 the two worked together to improve education by increasing the total number of secondary school and vocational training centers. Additional transportation improvement project occurred in 1973 and 1974. 1974 saw improvements to both of Jamaica's international airports, in part, because of support provided to Jamaica by the World Bank.

During the 1980s Jamaica and The World Bank cooperated in their joint effort to integrate Jamaica into international economy. During this period, cooperation focused, "on trade liberalization, increased foreign investment and structural adjustment of the economy." Projects during this era included the development of the Human Employment and Resource Training (HEART) program, an effort, "to expand vocational training opportunities to Jamaican youth." In 1982 the Kingston Free Zone facility was constructed, promoting exports, international trade, and employment. Finally, in 1988 Jamaica received funds for emergency reconstruction efforts after the Hurricane Gilbert.

== Partnership framework ==
In 2009, The Jamaica National Develop Agency published Vision 2030 Jamaica, an ambitious new framework that seeks to serve as a near to long-term guide to Jamaica's development. The plan was produced in response to the 2008 financial crisis, which effected Jamaica severely. Within the document, the development goals are as follows: 1: Jamaicans are empowered to achieve their fullest potential. 2:The Jamaican society is secure, cohesive and just. 3: Jamaica's economy is prosperous. 4: Jamaica has a healthy natural environment.

In order to support this effort, the World Bank has provided over $500 million US dollars towards development effort in Jamaica since 2013. World Bank project during this period have included initiatives to foster private sector modernization, with the goal being "to enhance the government's capacity and effectiveness.". Other initiates include, but are not limited to, improvements to the private sector, fostering of investment into high potential sectors, climate resilience projects, and increased capacity to gather climate data for risk management purposes.

=== International Bank for Reconstruction and Development (IBRD) ===
Provides Jamaica with project loans.

=== The International Finance Corporation (IFC) ===
The IFC provides Jamaica with investments and advisory services to support the nation's private sector. The IFC work in Jamaica in a variety of different sectors, such as the expansion and privatization of the Sangster International Airport.

=== IDA ===
Not a member

=== Multilateral Investment Guarantee Agency (MIGA) ===
Jamaica joined MIGA on April 12, 1988, as one of its 29 founding members. MIGA promotes foreign direct investment into Jamaica. In Jamaica, MIGA works in a number of different sectors, but has a special focus on the development of tourism, financial service, and the energy sector. MIGA has participated in 10 project in Jamaica by providing protection for investments against non-commercial risk. One such project is Port Authority of Jamaica project, where MIGA issued, "a $41.8 million guarantee to the Bank of Nova Scotia of Canada covering its $44 million shareholder loan to its subsidiary, the Bank of Nova Scotia Jamaica Limited. The coverage is for a period of up to 15 years against the risks of transfer restriction, expropriation, and breach of contract." The project, when completed, will handle 1.5 million containers, increasing international shipping to and from the island.

=== International Centre for Settlement of Investment Disputes (ICSID) ===
The ICSID is the World Bank's arbitration branch. Jamaica excludes investment disputes regarding natural resources. One case involving Jamaica and the ICSID is Jamaica, INC. v. Government of Jamaica.

== Results of World Bank Projects in Jamaica ==
In 2018, public debt fell below 100% of GPD for the first time in decades, and is expected to continue to decline below 60% by 2025–26. Furthermore, unemployment is at historic lows (7.8%), international's reserve coverage is high as well as stable, inflation has stabilized is reduced. Fitch, recently upgraded Jamaica's credit rating from B to B+. A sign of improving economic conditions. According to World Bank data, nearly 390,000 individuals have been impacted by the Program of Advancement through Health and Education (PATH). Research has indicated that PATH has been successful both in terms of its ability to target the poorest 20% of households, and an overall high level of satisfaction reported by those who engage with the program. Additionally, The Rural Economic Development Initiative (REDI) continues to improve market access for small-scale farmers and their service providers "by supporting revenue-generating activities in agriculture and tourism, while also providing critical infrastructure, marketing, and management support. More than 1,400 farmers have benefited from improved technology, training, and access to markets." REDI has been so successful that a second REDI project will impact an estimated 20,000 additional individuals, many of are at-risk women and youth.

Another project, The Jamaica Integrated Community Development Project, has improved safety and development conditions in 18 inner city and rural communities by improving infrastructure using sustainable solutions, such as solar lighting, or purchasing of safety equipment, such as fire hydrants or extinguishers. Other programs include building water supply systems, the implementation of school based violence prevention programs, training of youth in business, justice, and medical procedures, and much more.

Under a World Bank development program, The Jamaica Energy Security and Efficiency Enhancement Project, Jamaica has begun the transition to renewable energy. Since the program began, Jamaica has increased it generation capacity from 9% to 12% with a final goal of 20% by 2030, inline with Jamaica Vision 2030, lowering its dependence on expensive foreign oil.

The Youth Employment in Digital and Animation Industries Project has created more than 4,000 jobs for young Jamaicans in the digital sector, making way for the growth of a new Jamaican animation industry.

The International Finance Corporation (IFC) has funded a green energy project that has built 11 wind turbines (2016). When the project is completed, it is expected to produces about 120,000 megawatts of electricity per year, or just over 3% of the Jamaica's energy demands. When finished, the project is expected to produce energy that is among the cheapest available on the Jamaican energy grid, all while offsetting the equivalent emissions of approximately 13,000 cars.

=== Selected Project ===
The Road Infrastructure Planning and Maintenance Project was approved in December 1990. The project directed $35 million, all committed by the IRBD, strengthening the institutional capabilities of the ministry of construction, develop road infrastructure in a cost-effective manner, and improving road safety. The project was implemented by the Ministry of Construction, and completed in December 1996.

== Criticism of The World Bank in Jamaica ==
Some argue that the Jamaican financial crisis of the 1990s, which caused the failure of numerous organizations and eventually required large scale government intervention, can trace its origins to the Structural Adjustment Programs (SAPs) that World Bank organized. These SAPs included the removal of credit controls, privatization of the financial sector, the adoption of market determined deposit rates, and removal of price ceilings, among other changes. It is argued by some that the ensuing financial crisis was induced by these changes. Professor of Development Finance at The University of The West Indies, David Tennant, argues, "This dramatic increase in the rate at which loans were being issued to the private sector was unsustainable, as the risks associated with such loans were not properly assessed, collateral was neither adequate nor properly verified, and the loans were mainly for consumer-oriented activities."

== Alternative lending institutions ==
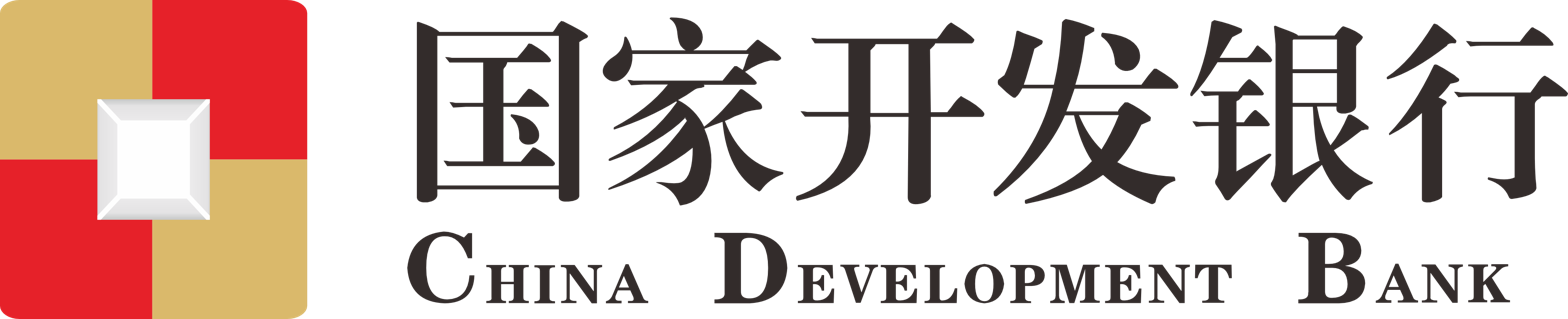
China Development Bank (CDB) logo

Highway 2000, completed in 2003, was a large scale development project that has connected the northern and southern end of the Island via a new highway, stretching over 67 km (41.6 miles). Nicknamed the "Beijing Highway", Highway 2000 was funded, in part, by the China Development Bank (CDB). The project also received financing from the International Finance Corporation (IFC), The European Investment Bank (EIB), The Inter-American Development Bank (IDB), and Proparco (AFD). In a study of the project, it was noted that Multilateral Development banks (MDBs) "have higher social and environmental safeguards than commercial banks or the China Development Bank; and this benefitted all phases of the project"

== See also ==
- Jamaica and the International Monetary Fund
