= Joyce Purnick =

American columnist and journalist

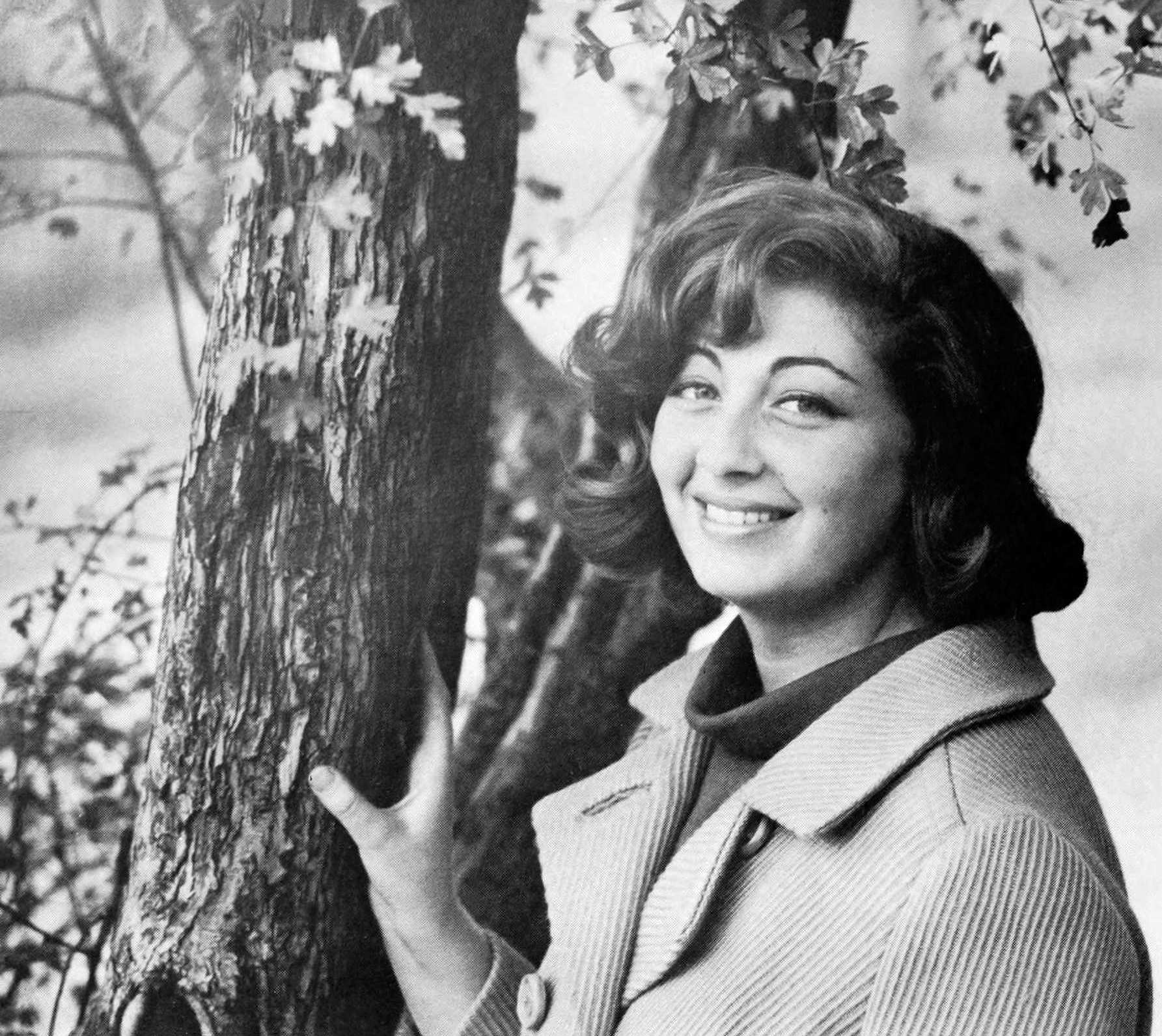
- College yearbook portrait, 1967
- Born: May 17, 1946 (age 79)
- Education: B.A. Barnard College
- Occupation: Journalist
- Spouse: Max Frankel (m. 1988; died 2025)
- Parent(s): Charlotte Leah Purnick; Jack Purnick
- Relatives: David Frankel (stepchild)

Joyce Purnick (born May 17, 1946) is an American columnist and journalist.

== Biography ==
Purnick was born on May 17, 1946, in New York City, the daughter of Charlotte Leah and Jacob "Jack" Purnick. In 1967, she graduated with a B.A. from Barnard College.

In 1970, she started her career as a news clerk with the New York Post eventually rising to chief political writer. In 1979, she accepted a position at The New York Times focusing on New York state, New York City government, and the New York City school system. In 1989, she served on the paper's editorial board as the paper's urban affairs analyst. In 1994, she wrote the twice weekly Metro Matters column covering local New York topics. In 1997, she was named deputy editor of the Metro department, the paper's largest section and the first woman to do so. In 1999, she returned to writing Metro Matters.

== Awards ==
- 1996-97: Mike Berger Award from Columbia University's Graduate School of Journalism.
- 1996: George Polk Award for metropolitan reporting for an exposé on the neglect of abused children by the city's welfare system
- 1987: Peter Kihss Award for reporting on city government from the Fund for the City of New York
- 1979: Front Page Award from the Newswomen's Club of New York for political columns in New York magazine
- 1975: from the Newspaper Guild and the Newswomen's Club of New York for feature writing at the New York Post

== Books ==
- Mike Bloomberg: Money, Power, Politics (2009)

== Personal life ==
Purnick was married to writer and former New York Times executive editor, Max Frankel. She lives in Manhattan.
