= Max Frankel =

American journalist and editor (1930–2025)

- Frankel in 1976
- Born: April 3, 1930; Gera, Thuringia, Germany
- Died: March 23, 2025 (aged 94); New York City, U.S.
- Education: Columbia University (BA, MA)
- Occupation: Journalist
- Employer: The New York Times
- Spouses: Tobia Brown (m. 1956; died 1987); Joyce Purnick (m. 1988)
- Children: 3, including David Frankel

Max Frankel (April 3, 1930 – March 23, 2025) was an American journalist who was executive editor of The New York Times from 1986 to 1994. He won a Pulitzer Prize in 1973 for his coverage of Richard Nixon's visit to China. He also brought attention to The New York Times underreporting on the Holocaust. He is the father of film director David Frankel.

== Early life and career ==
Frankel was born in Gera, Germany, on April 3, 1930, the son of Mary (Katz) and Jakob Frankel. He was an only child, and his family belonged to a Jewish minority in the area; his parents were from Galicia, and had Polish passports. Hitler came to power when Frankel was less than three years old, and Frankel remembered Germany's racial hatred: "[I] could have become a good little Nazi in his army. I loved the parades; I wept when other kids marched beneath our window without me. But I was ineligible for the Aryan race, the Master Race that Hitler wanted to purify of Jewish blood…".

External videos
- Presentation by Frankel on The Times of My Life and My Life with the Times, March 29, 1999, C-SPAN
- Booknotes interview with Frankel on The Times of My Life and My Life with the Times, April 18, 1999, C-SPAN
- Presentation by Frankel on High Noon in the Cold War, November 13, 2004, C-SPAN

Frankel came to the United States in 1940 without being able to speak English at the age of nine with his mother to be with his cousins in New York. Before they left, Frankel's father had been separated from the rest of the family and sent to a Soviet gulag. He attended the High School of Music & Art in Manhattan, class of 1948. He attended Columbia College, where he was editor-in-chief of the Columbia Daily Spectator, and began part-time work for The New York Times when he was 19. He received his BA degree in 1952 and an MA in government from Columbia in 1953. He joined The Times as a full-time reporter in 1952. After serving in the U.S. Army from 1953 to 1955, he covered the collision of the Andrea Doria and the Stockholm, then was sent overseas in October 1956 to help cover stories arising from the Hungarian Revolution and Polish October. From 1957 to 1960, he was a Times correspondent in Moscow. After reporting from Cuba and the United Nations, he moved to Washington in 1961, where he became a diplomatic correspondent who covered the U.S. State Department and foreign policy. He wrote many articles about the Cuban Missile Crisis and was present during many calls between James Reston, chief of Frankel's news bureau, and President John Kennedy. On October 22, the day before announcing his "quarantine" of Cuba, Kennedy requested that The Times refrain from publishing news on the imminent blockade in interest of national security. Frankel originally objected to the request but relented after Kennedy promised that he would not order an attack on Cuba in the meantime. He became the White House correspondent of The New York Times in 1966. During the early part of that tenure, he wrote several articles enthusiastically supporting the Indonesian mass killings of 1965-66.

Frankel was chief Washington correspondent and head of the Washington bureau from 1968 to 1972, during which he was a key actor in shepherding the eventual publication of The Pentagon Papers after he received excerpts of the papers from Neil Sheehan in March 1971. He became Sunday editor of the times in 1973. He won the Pulitzer Prize the same year for his coverage of Richard Nixon's visit to the People's Republic of China.

Frankel was one of the panelists at the second 1976 United States presidential debate. In the debate, Frankel asked incumbent president Gerald Ford about his response to criticisms regarding the Helsinki Accords, particularly the accusation that they were favorable to the Soviet Union. Ford defended himself by saying, "There is no Soviet domination of Eastern Europe, and there never will be under a Ford administration." Frankel asked for clarification, to which Ford replied that Yugoslavia, Romania, and Poland did not consider themselves dominated by the Soviet Union. The incident tarnished Ford's reputation, reinforcing his image as clumsy and misguided.

Frankel was interviewed in the 1985 documentary We Were So Beloved, a movie that interviewed German Jews who emigrated from Nazi Germany to New York City. On November 14, 2001, in the 150th anniversary issue, The New York Times ran an article by the then-retired Frankel reporting that before and during World War II, the Times had as a matter of policy largely, though not entirely, ignored reports of the annihilation of European Jews. Frankel called it "the century's bitterest journalistic failure".

Frankel published the book High Noon in the Cold War: Kennedy, Khrushchev and the Cuban Missiles Crisis (Ballantine, 2004, and Presidio, 2005) and, also, his memoir, The Times of My Life and My Life with the Times (Random House, 1999, and Delta, 2000). Frankel retired in 2000.

== Personal life and death ==
Frankel was married twice. His first wife, whom he married in 1956, was Tobia Brown, with whom he had three children: director David Frankel, artist Margot Frankel Goldberg, and broadcast journalist Jonathan Frankel. Tobia died of a brain tumor at the age of 52 in 1987. Max Frankel was married again in 1988 to Joyce Purnick, a Times columnist and editor.

He could speak German, Yiddish, and Polish, as well as some Russian, French and Spanish.

Frankel died from bladder cancer at his home in Manhattan, New York on March 23, 2025, at the age of 94.

On June 18, 2025, Max's life was celebrated with a major memorial service at the New York Times Center in Manhattan. But it was a ceremony Frankel had never wanted, his son, David, admitted, adding: "This is the first, and the last time, we ever ignored him."

== See also ==
- The New York Times and the Holocaust
