= Mutabaruka =

Jamaican dub poet (born 1952)

Mutabaruka CD
- Born: Allan Hope; 26 December 1952 (age 73); Rae Town, Kingston, Colony of Jamaica, British Empire
- Occupations: Poet, songwriter, musician, educator, radio talk-show host
- Writing career
- Pen name: Mutabaruka
- Period: Early 1970s–present

Allan Hope CD (born 26 December 1952), better known as Mutabaruka, is a Jamaican Rastafari dub poet, musician, actor, educator, and talk-show host, who developed two of Jamaica's most popular radio programmes, The Cutting Edge and Steppin' Razor. His name comes from the Rwandan language and translates as "one who is always victorious". His themes include politics, culture, Black liberation, social oppression, discrimination, poverty, racism, sexism, and religion.

== Early life and education ==
Mutabaruka was born and raised in Rae Town, Kingston, Jamaica, in a household with his father, mother and two sisters. When he was eight years old his father died. Mutabaruka attended the Kingston Technical High School, where he trained in electronics for four years, going on to work for the Jamaican Telephone Company until eventually quitting in 1971.

Mutabaruka was drawn into the black awareness movement of the late 1960s and early '70s. In school he read many "progressive books", including Eldridge Cleaver's Soul on Ice and others that were then illegal in Jamaica, such as The Autobiography of Malcolm X. Raised as a Roman Catholic, he began examining and immersing himself in the Rastafari movement. He stopped combing his hair and started growing dreadlocks, changed to an ital diet, and even stopped wearing shoes as he became a Rastafari. He adopted the name Mutabaruka, a term from the Rwandan language, Kinyarwanda, meaning "one who is always victorious".

== Musical career 1971–2000 ==
Mutabaruka left Kingston in 1971, relocating to the Potosi Hills, where he lived with his wife and two children in a house that he built himself. He was among the new wave of Jamaican poets that emerged in the early 1970s. Early work by Mutabaruka was first presented in the magazine Swing from 1971. Introducing Outcry (March 1973), his first collection released as Mutabaruka, John A. L. Golding Jr. wrote: "In July 1971, Swing Magazine published for the first time a poem by Allan Mutabaruka.... Our readers were ecstatic. Since then, and almost in consecutive issues, we have derived much pleasure in further publication of this brother's works.... They tell a story common to most black people born in the ghetto.... And when Muta writes, it's loud and clear". He received attention for "Wailin'" in 1974, a work referencing songs by The Wailers, and in 1976 released the collection Sun and Moon.

In 1977 he began performing live, backed by his band, Truth. He had a hit record in Jamaica the following year with "Outcry", backed by Cedric Brooks' the Light of Saba. After being invited to perform at a Jimmy Cliff concert in the early 1980s, guitarist Earl "Chinna" Smith worked on a backing track for "Every Time a Ear Di Sound", beginning a long working relationship with Smith; Released as a single, it was a hit in Jamaica.

He became known internationally after his performance at Reggae Sunsplash in 1981, the first of several performances at the festival. His 1983 release Check It was released on Chicago blues label Alligator Records, and further increased his popularity. He curated the 1983 compilation album Word Sound 'ave Power, released by Heartbeat Records, and in 1984 Shanachie Records released his album The Mystery Unfolds. He went on to record collaborations with both Gregory Isaacs and Dennis Brown, on "Hard Road to Travel" and "Great Kings of Africa" respectively. He continued to record and perform, and in the mid-1990s began presenting a late night talk show on radio station Irie FM called The Cutting Edge, and quickly became one of Jamaica's most sought-after and controversial radio personalities.

In 1990, Mutabaruka's poem "Dis Poem", from his album The Mystery Unfolds (Shanachie Records, 1986) was used as the acappella introduction of "The Poem", a song by house music and dancehall reggae artist and producer Bobby Konders, which brought his work to a wider audience. "The Poem" was released on Nu Groove records in 1990. He performed on the side stage for parts of the 1993 Lollapalooza music festival.

He had further hits in the latter half of the 1990s, including "Wise Up" (with Sugar Minott) and "Psalm 24" (with Luciano).

== Speaking and narration, 2000–present ==
Mutabaruka gave a lecture at Stanford University in 2000 on the difference between education and indoctrination, In 2001, he served as narrator for filmmaker Stephanie Black's Life and Debt, a documentary about the impact of global economic policy and the IMF on the economy and people of Jamaica. The title song "Life and Debt" was released on Mutabaruka's 2002 album Life Squared.

In 2007 he taught African-American studies at Merritt College in California. He has lectured and performed at many establishments in Jamaica and the United States.

In 2008, Mutabaruka was featured as part of the Jamaica episode of the television programme Anthony Bourdain: No Reservations.

In February 2010, Mutabaruka was honoured by the National Centre for Youth Development (NCYD) and the Rotaract Club of Mandeville for over 30 years of outstanding work in the field of the arts. Later on in 2010, he was recognized by Senegal with a hut built in his honour.

In September 2010, he recited a tribute poem in honour of Lucky Dube, whose music he said sought to "liberate the oppressed". In August 2011 Mutabaruka spoke at the First Jamaica Poetry Festival in honour of Marcus Garvey and Louise Bennett. On the final day of the Rastafari Studies Conference, professors of the West Indies described Mutabaruka as an icon.

His outspoken statements on theology and the oppressive roles played by religious institutions have generated much controversy.

Although he is a non-smoker, Mutabaraka has campaigned for the decriminalization of cannabis. Mutabaruka is critical of alcohol, cigarettes and junk food, and has stated that "the legal drugs are more dangerous than the illegal drugs."

In 2016, the government of Jamaica awarded Mutabaruka the Order of Distinction, Commander Class (one of the highest distinctions in the country), in recognition of his cultural contributions.

== Discography ==
=== Albums ===
Year	Title	Label
1982	Live at Reggae Sunsplash	Sunsplash
1982	Check It!	High Times
1983	Dub Poets Dub	Heartbeat
1984	Outcry	Shanachie
1986	The Mystery Unfolds	Shanachie
1989	Any Which Way...Freedom	Shanachie
1990	Mutabaruka	Rounder
1991	Blakk Wi Blak...K...K...	Shanachie
1994	Melanin Man	Shanachie
1998	Gathering of the Spirits	Shanachie
1998	Muta in Dub	Blackheart
2002	Life Squared	Heartbeat
2006	In Combination	Revolver
2009	Life And Lessons	Gallo Record Company
2023	Black Attack	Shanachie

Compilations

- The Ultimate Collection (1992), Greensleeves

=== Singles ===
Featured in

- 2021: "Guns of Navarone" (Sean Paul feat. Jesse Royal, Stonebwoy & Mutabaruka)

== DVD/Video ==
- Live at Reggae Sumfest (1993) (VHS/DVD)
- The Return to the Motherland (2011) (DVD)

== Books of poetry ==
- Outcry (SWING, 1973)
- Sun and Moon (S. Harrison, 1976) - with Faybiene
- The Book: First Poems (Issa, 1980)
- The Next Poems (Issa, 2005)

== Filmography ==
- Land of Look Behind (1981) - Himself
- Sankofa (1993) - Shango
- One Love (2003) - Rasta elder

== See also ==
- Caribbean poetry
