= Bebe Neuwirth =

American actress (born 1958)

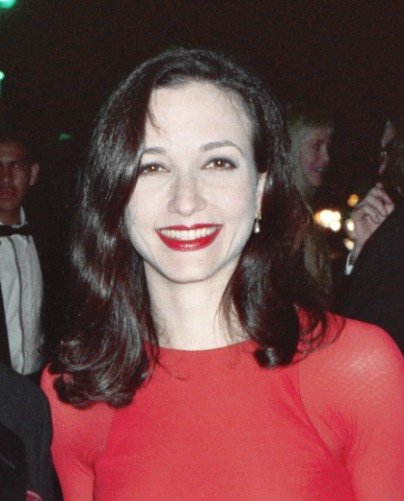
- Neuwirth in 1991
- Born: Beatrice Jane Neuwirth; December 31, 1958 (age 67); Newark, New Jersey, U.S.
- Education: Juilliard School (BFA)
- Occupations: Actress; singer; dancer
- Years active: 1980–present
- Spouses: Paul Dorman (m. 1984; div. 1991); Chris Calkins (m. 2009)

Beatrice Jane "Bebe" Neuwirth (/ˈbiːbi ˈnjuːwɜːrθ/ BEE-bee NEW-wurth; born December 31, 1958) is an American actress, singer, and dancer. Known for her roles on stage and screen, she has received two Emmy Awards, two Tony Awards, and two Drama Desk Awards.

Neuwirth made her Broadway debut in the musical A Chorus Line in 1980. She went on to win two Tony Awards, the first for Best Featured Actress in a Musical playing Nickie in the revival of Sweet Charity (1986) and received her second for Best Actress in a Musical for Velma Kelly in the revival of Chicago (1996). She has also starred as Lola in the revival of Damn Yankees (1994) and Morticia Addams in The Addams Family (2010). She was nominated for another Tony Award for her performance as Fräulein Schneider in Cabaret (2024).

On television, her breakthrough role was as Dr. Lilith Sternin, Frasier Crane's wife on the sitcom Cheers, as well as guest appearances in its spin-off Frasier and the 2023 Frasier revival. The role earned her two Primetime Emmy Awards for Outstanding Supporting Actress in a Comedy Series. Neuwirth was cast as Bureau Chief/ADA Tracey Kibre in NBC's Law & Order: Trial by Jury which ran for 2005 to 2006. She starred as Nadine Tolliver on the CBS political drama Madam Secretary from 2014 to 2017. She also appeared in recurring roles on Blue Bloods (2013–2019), The Good Wife (2012–2014), The Good Fight (2018–2021), and Julia (2022–2023).

In film, she portrayed Nora Shepherd in the original Jumanji (1995) and Jumanji: The Next Level (2019). Other film roles include Say Anything... (1989), Green Card (1990), Bugsy (1991), Celebrity, The Faculty (both 1998), Summer of Sam (1999), and How to Lose a Guy in 10 Days (2003).

== Early life ==
Bebe Neuwirth was born in Newark, New Jersey. Her German Jewish father, Lee Neuwirth, was a mathematician who taught at Princeton University and also designed an encryption device while working at the Institute for Defense Analyses. Her mother, Sydney Anne Neuwirth, is a painter who also danced as an amateur for the Princeton Regional Ballet Company. She has an older brother, Peter, a mathematician and actuary who graduated from Harvard. She attended Chapin School and Princeton Day School, and Princeton High School. In her youth, Neuwirth rebelled against authority, being placed in custody for smoking marijuana when she was 13.

Neuwirth started taking ballet lessons at the age of five, a year after viewing a production of The Nutcracker with her mother. She desired to be a ballet dancer until her early teens, when she realized how restricted her technique was as well as the standard of ballet education where she lived. Upon viewing the musical Pippin in Manhattan at 13, she changed her future plans from becoming a ballerina to being a Broadway musical dancer. After graduating from Princeton High School in 1976, she attended the Juilliard School for dance and left after only a year, disliking the school for having a "stifling creative environment" and no Broadway-style dance training. Immediately after leaving Juilliard in 1977, she took singing and jazz classes at a New York City-based YWCA, one of them taught by Joan Morton Lucas, who appeared in the film Singin' in the Rain (1952) and the original Broadway production of Kiss Me Kate. She performed with the Princeton Ballet Company in Peter and the Wolf, The Nutcracker, and Coppélia, also appearing in community theater musicals.

== Career ==
=== Theater work ===
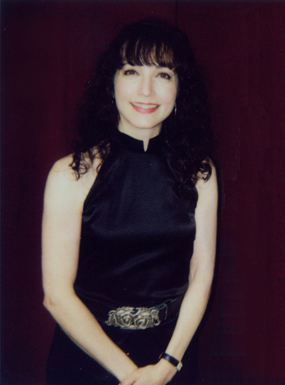
Neuwirth at the Annual Flea Market and Grand Auction hosted by Broadway Cares/Equity Fights AIDS, September 26, 2006.

Studying acting for two years under Suzanne Shepard, Neuwirth made her Broadway debut in the role of Sheila Bryant in A Chorus Line in 1980. She later appeared in revivals of Little Me (1982); Sweet Charity (1986), for which she won a Tony Award for Best Featured Actress in a Musical at the 40th Tony Awards; and Damn Yankees (1994).

1996 saw Neuwirth play Velma Kelly in the Broadway revival of Chicago. She described the difficulty level of the role as "like performing microsurgery from 8 to 10:20." That role brought her her greatest stage recognition to date and several awards including a Tony Award, Drama Desk Award and Outer Critics Circle Award for Best Leading Actress in a Musical. Neuwirth would later return to the revival of Chicago in 2006, this time as Roxie Hart. In 2014, she returned again, this time playing "Mama" Morton, making her the first person to play three different characters at three separate times during the course of a single Broadway run.

She appeared in the musical revue Here Lies Jenny, which featured songs by Kurt Weill. Neuwirth and a four-person supporting cast sang and danced to the song as part of an unspoken, ambiguous story in an anonymous seedy bar possibly in Berlin in the 1930s. The show ran from May 7 through October 3, 2004, in the Zipper Theater in New York. Neuwirth also appeared in the show in San Francisco in 2005. In 2009, Neuwirth toured a one-woman cabaret show with pianist Scott Cady. The cabaret included music by Kurt Weill, Stephen Sondheim, Tom Waits, John Lennon, Paul McCartney, John Kander and Fred Ebb amongst others. In 2010, she returned to Broadway to create the role of Morticia Addams in the original production of The Addams Family opposite Nathan Lane.

In 2019, Neuwirth returned to the stage with the Philadelphia Theatre Company, appearing in A Small Fire at the Suzanne Roberts Theater in Philadelphia. In 2023, she was inducted into the Theatre Hall of Fame. In 2024, she returned to Broadway playing Fräulein Schneider in a revival of Cabaret, for which she received a nomination for the Tony Award for Best Featured Actress in a Musical at the 77th Tony Awards.

=== Film and television ===
While in Los Angeles waiting to receive a Tony for her appearance in Sweet Charity in 1985, Neuwirth auditioned for the role of Dr. Lilith Sternin in the television series Cheers. At the time, Neuwirth was not interested in doing television work and her character was initially planned to be in only one episode of the series. However, the writers enjoyed writing her dialogue so much that she was written into more episodes of the show, eventually making her one of the series' recurring actors.

Neuwirth's character Lilith eventually married Frasier Crane (Kelsey Grammer). From the fourth to the ninth season, Neuwirth portrayed Lilith in a regular recurring role, and she appeared on the show as a main star for both seasons ten and eleven. Like Kelsey Grammer when he started on the show as Frasier, she was not immediately given star billing in the opening credits but in the end credits for seasons eight and nine, appearing in the opening credits with her own portrait in seasons ten and eleven. She won two Emmy Awards for Outstanding Supporting Actress in a Comedy Series for the role, in 1990 and 1991. The character also made an appearance in the series Wings and in twelve episodes of the Cheers spin-off Frasier, which earned her a 1995 Emmy Award nomination for Outstanding Guest Actress in a Comedy Series at the 47th Primetime Emmy Awards. She left Cheers in 1993 to go back to her career in dancing, but would make more television appearances in other shows and commercials.

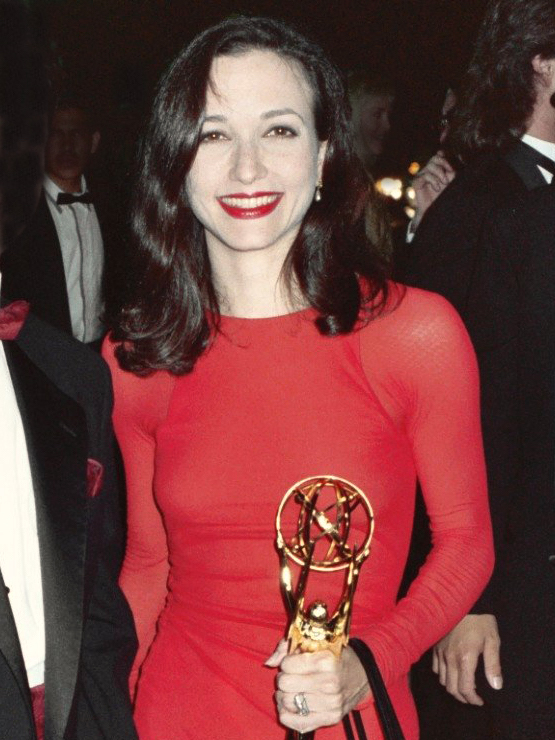
Neuwirth at the Governor's Ball of the Primetime Emmy Awards on August 25, 1991

Neuwirth's dip into the film industry began in 1989 with small roles in films such as Say Anything... (1989), Pacific Heights (1990), and Penny Ante (1990). In 1990 she started doing supporting roles in films including Green Card (1990), Bugsy (1991), and Malice (1993), in all of which she received acclaim from critics for her performances. Her first lead role came in 1993, when she played Margaret, a married woman attracted to her neighbor Wesley (Will Patton), in the psychological thriller comedy film The Paint Job (also released as Painted Heart). Her other credits include Jumanji, Summer of Sam, Liberty Heights, An Extremely Goofy Movie, The Adventures of Pinocchio, Tadpole, The Associate, How to Lose a Guy in 10 Days, The Big Bounce, Le Divorce, The Faculty, and Woody Allen's Celebrity. In 1996, she starred in a pilot for a TV series called Dear Diary for ABC which was not picked up. The producers had it edited slightly and put into a single theater for a single weekend in November 1996, and it became one of only two TV pilots to be nominated for an Oscar and, at the 69th Academy Awards, the only one to win.

Other small-screen credits include a guest appearance in the second season of NewsRadio, a small role on The Adventures of Pete and Pete (episode: "The Call"), Deadline (2000), Hack (2003), Law & Order: Trial by Jury (2005) as ADA Tracey Kibre, Law & Order: Special Victims Unit (1999) as Nina Laszlo, a modeling agent/suspect, the miniseries Wild Palms, and the fourth season Star Trek: The Next Generation episode "First Contact" as Lanel.

Neuwirth appeared as herself in episodes of Will & Grace, Strangers with Candy and Celebrity Jeopardy!. In 2009, she co-starred as Ms. Lynn Kraft in the remake of Fame. She had a recurring role as Caroline Taylor, the literary editor of Jonathan Ames (Jason Schwartzman), on the HBO series Bored to Death. She also had a recurring role on Blue Bloods.

Neuwirth starred as Nadine Tolliver in the 2014 CBS political drama Madam Secretary. In October 2017, Neuwirth announced her decision to leave the series after four seasons. No reason was given. She later reprised the role of Nora Shepherd in Jumanji: The Next Level in 2019; the film grossed $800 million worldwide and received positive reviews from critics.

== Personal life ==
In 1984, Neuwirth married Paul Dorman. She met him in 1982 after she performed in Upstairs at O'Neal's, a revue at O'Neal's restaurant in New York, where he was bartending. The two divorced in 1991. In 2009, she married director, producer and writer Chris Calkins at The Players club in Manhattan, in a ceremony officiated by actor Peter Coyote.

Bebe Neuwirth was born to a Jewish family but was not raised in a religious household. She has described herself as a "cultural Jew" with no formal religious training or temple attendance, though she had some limited exposure to holidays like Hanukkah and Passover as a child.

Neuwirth has supported and worked for several non-profit charity organizations. Following two hip replacement surgeries, and after hearing stories of other dancers facing hip problems, Neuwirth was moved to establish the Dancers' Resource program at The Actors Fund, which caters to financial and physical needs unique to professional dancers. Neuwirth currently serves as vice chair on the board of trustees for The Actors Fund. She has also helped Seeds of Peace.

As an animal lover, she has contributed to the Chatham, New York-based horse rescue group Equine Advocates and the annual pet adoption event Broadway Barks. Neuwirth is particularly fond of cats. In the 1990s, she owned one, Frankie, that she named after architect and writer Frank Lloyd Wright. As of August 2016, she had a black cat, Bobby, a long-haired calico cat, Tallulah, and a mixed Siamese cat, Billie.

In her free time, Neuwirth enjoys making pottery, which she first learned in high school.

== Acting credits ==
=== Film ===
Year	Title	Role	Notes
1989	Say Anything...	Mrs. Evans	
1990	Green Card	Lauren Adler	
1991	Bugsy	Countess Dorothy di Frasso	
1992	Painted Heart AKA The Paint Job	Margaret	
1993	Malice	Det. Dana Harris	
1995	Jumanji	Nora Shepherd	
1996	All Dogs Go to Heaven 2	Annabelle	Voice
1996	The Adventures of Pinocchio	Felinet	
1996	The Associate	Camille Scott	
1996	Dear Diary	Annie	Short film
1998	Celebrity	Nina	
1998	The Faculty	Principal Valerie Drake	
1998	An All Dogs Christmas Carol	Annabelle/Belladonna	Voice
1999	Getting to Know You	Trix	
1999	Summer of Sam	Gloria	
1999	Liberty Heights	Ada Kurtzman	
2000	An Extremely Goofy Movie	Sylvia Marpole	Voice
2002	Tadpole	Diane Lodder	
2002	The Adventures of Tom Thumb and Thumbelina	Thumbelina's Mother	Voice
2003	How to Lose a Guy in 10 Days	Lana Jong	
2003	Le Divorce	Julia Manchevering	
2004	The Big Bounce	Alison Ritchie	
2005	Game 6	Joanne Bourne	
2008	Adopt a Sailor	Patricia	
2009	Fame	Ms. Lynn Kraft	
2017	Humor Me	C.C. Rudin	
2019	Jumanji: The Next Level	Nora Shepherd	Cameo
2020	Modern Persuasion	Vanessa Perry	
2021	Tick, Tick... Boom!	"Sunday" Legend	
2026	Don't Say Good Luck	Linda	
2026	Jumanji: Open World	Nora Shepherd	Post-production

=== Television ===
Year	Title	Role	Notes
1986–1993	Cheers	Dr. Lilith Sternin-Crane	Main cast (81 episodes)
1986	Simon & Simon	Receptionist	Episode: "Family Forecast"
1986	Fame	Phyllis Turner	Episode: "Stagefright"
1990	The Famous Teddy Z	Donna Gates	Episode: "Teddy Gets a Guru"
1990	The Magical World of Disney	Dr. Lilith Sternin	Episode: "Disneyland's 35th Anniversary Celebration"
1990	Without Her Consent	Gloria Allred	Television film
1991	Star Trek: The Next Generation	Lanel	Episode: "First Contact"
1992	Wings	Dr. Lilith Sternin-Crane	Episode: "Planes, Trains and Visiting Cranes"
1993	Wild Palms	Tabba Schwartzkopf	5 episodes
1994	The Adventures of Pete & Pete	Mailwoman McGinty	2 episodes
1994–1995	Aladdin	Mirage	Voice, 6 episodes
1994–2003	Frasier	Dr. Lilith Sternin	12 episodes
1995	NewsRadio	Sandi Angelini	Episode: "Friends"
1996	Duckman	Tamara La Boinque	Voice, episode: "Noir Gang"
1996	Freakazoid!	Deadpan	Voice, episode: "The Wrath of Guitierrez"
1996–1998	All Dogs Go to Heaven: The Series	Annabelle/Belladonna	Voice, main cast (20 episodes)
1997	The Magic School Bus	Flora Whiff	Voice, episode: "Makes a Stink"
1997	Jungle Cubs	La La	Episode: "Old Green Teeth/The Elephant Who Couldn't Say No"
1997–1998	Pepper Ann	Ms. Bronte Bladdar	Voice, 5 episodes
1999	Dash and Lilly	Dorothy Parker	Television film
1999	Sabrina, the Teenage Witch	Juliette	Episode: "Salem and Juliette"
1999–2005	Law & Order: Special Victims Unit	Nina Laszlo/ADA Tracey Kibre	2 episodes
2000	Strangers with Candy	Herself	Episode: "To Love, Honor, and Pretend"
2000	Cupid & Cate	Francesca DeAngelo	Television film
2000–2001	Deadline	Nikki Masucci	Main cast (13 episodes)
2002–2003	Cyberchase	Binky	Voice, 2 episodes
2003	Hack	Faith O'Connor	5 episodes
2004	Will & Grace	Herself	Episode: "No Sex 'N' the City"
2005–2006	Law & Order: Trial by Jury	ADA Tracey Kibre	Main cast (13 episodes)
2009–2011	Bored to Death	Caroline Taylor	3 episodes
2010	The Cleveland Show	Sarah Friedman	Voice, episode: "Brotherly Love"
2012–2013	The Good Wife	Judge Claudia Friend	3 episodes
2013	Browsers	Julianna Mancuso-Bruni	Unsold TV pilot
2013–2019	Blue Bloods	Kelly Peterson	9 episodes
2014–2017	Madam Secretary	Nadine Tolliver	Main cast (71 episodes)
2014	Over the Garden Wall	Margueritte Grey	Voice, episode: "Mad Love"
2017	New York Is Dead	Sylvia	Episode: "#1.1"
2017	The President Show	Herself	Episode: "I Came Up with Christmas – A President Show Christmas"
2018–2021	The Good Fight	Judge Claudia Friend	2 episodes
2020	DuckTales	Emma Glamour	Voice, episode: "Louie's Eleven!"
2020	The Flight Attendant	Diana Carlisle	2 episodes
2021	Ultra City Smiths	Lady Andrea The Giant	Voice, 5 episodes
2021–2023	Teenage Euthanasia	Baba Fantasy	Voice, main cast (17 episodes)
2022	Duncanville	Patricia (voice)	2 episodes
2022–2023	Julia	Avis DeVoto	Main cast (16 episodes)
2023	Captain Fall	Alexis Fall	Voice; 3 episodes
2023	Frasier	Dr. Lilith Sternin	Episode: "Freddy's Birthday"
2024	Hailey's On It!	Babs Cadabs	Voice, episode: "Magician: Impossible"
TBA	Myron Bolitar	Ellen Bolitar	Recurring role, upcoming series

=== Stage ===
Year	Title	Role(s)	Venue
1980	A Chorus Line	Sheila Bryant, u/s Cassie Ferguson	Shubert Theatre, Broadway
1981	Dancin'	Dancer	Ambassador Theatre, Broadway
1982	Little Me	Boom Boom Girl	Eugene O'Neill Theatre, Broadway
1982	Upstairs at O'Neal's	Performer	O'Neal's, Off-Broadway
1986	Sweet Charity	Nickie, s/b Charity Valentine	Minskoff Theatre, Broadway
1988	Anything Goes	Bonnie LaTour	Al Hirschfeld Theatre, Miami
1992	Chicago	Velma Kelly	Terrace Theater, Los Angeles
1992	Kiss of the Spider Woman	Spider Woman/Aurora	Shaftesbury Theatre, West End
1994	Damn Yankees	Lola	Marquis Theatre, Broadway
1995	Pal Joey	Melba Snyder	New York City Center Encores!
1996	Chicago	Velma Kelly	New York City Center Encores!
1996	Noël Coward in Two Keys	Maud Caragnani in Come Into the Garden, Maud; Hilde Latymer in A Song at Twilight	Bay Street Theater, Sag Harbor
1996–1998	Chicago	Velma Kelly	Ambassador Theatre, Broadway
1999	The Threepenny Opera	Jenny Diver	American Conservatory Theater, San Francisco
1999	The Taming of the Shrew	Katherina Minola	Williamstown Theatre Festival
2001	Fosse	Various	Broadhurst Theatre, Broadway
2001	Everett Beekin	Anna/Nell	Mitzi Newhouse Theater, Off-Broadway
2002	Funny Girl	Fanny Brice	Concert, New Amsterdam Theatre
2002	The Exonerated	Sunny Jacobs	45 Bleecker Theater, Off-Broadway
2003	Writer's Block	Sheila	Atlantic Theater Company, Off-Broadway
2004	Here Lies Jenny	Jenny	Zipper Theatre, Off-Broadway
2005	Ashley Montana Goes Ashore in the Caicos … Or What Am I Doing Here?	Performer	The Flea Theater, Off-Off-Broadway
2006–2007	Chicago	Roxie Hart	Ambassador Theatre, Broadway
2009	The Addams Family	Morticia Addams	The Ford Center for the Performing Arts Oriental Theatre, Chicago
2010–2011	The Addams Family	Morticia Addams	Lunt-Fontanne Theatre, Broadway
2012	A Midsummer Night's Dream	Hippolyta/Titania	Classic Stage Company, Off-Broadway
2012	Golden Age	Maria Malibran	New York City Center, Off-Broadway
2014	Chicago	Matron "Mama" Morton	Ambassador Theatre, Broadway
2018	Hey, Look Me Over!	Mimi	New York City Center Encores!
2019	A Small Fire	Emily Bridges	Suzanne Roberts Theatre, Philadelphia
2022	The Bedwetter	Nana	Atlantic Theater Company, Off-Broadway
2024	Gutenberg! The Musical!	The Producer (one night only)	James Earl Jones Theatre, Broadway
2024–2025	Cabaret	Fräulein Schneider	August Wilson Theatre, Broadway

=== Audiobooks ===
Year	Title	Role	Production company
2004	Snow, Glass, Apples	The Queen	Audible
2020	The Sandman	The Siamese Cat	Audible

== Awards and nominations ==
Year	Association	Category	Nominated work	Result
1986	Drama Desk Awards	Outstanding Featured Actress in a Musical	Sweet Charity	Nominated
1986	Tony Awards	Best Featured Actress in a Musical	Sweet Charity	Won
1990	Primetime Emmy Awards	Outstanding Supporting Actress in a Comedy Series	Cheers	Won
1990	Viewers for Quality Television	Best Supporting Actress in a Quality Comedy Series	Cheers	Nominated
1991	Primetime Emmy Awards	Outstanding Supporting Actress in a Comedy Series	Cheers	Won
1991	Viewers for Quality Television	Best Supporting Actress in a Quality Comedy Series	Cheers	Nominated
1995	Primetime Emmy Awards	Outstanding Guest Actress in a Comedy Series	Frasier	Nominated
1997	Drama Desk Awards	Outstanding Actress in a Musical	Chicago	Won
1997	Tony Awards	Best Actress in a Musical	Chicago	Won
1998	Annie Awards	Outstanding Achievement in Voice Acting, Female	All Dogs Go to Heaven	Nominated
1999	American Comedy Awards	Funniest Female Guest Appearance in a Television Series	Frasier	Nominated
1999	Primetime Emmy Awards	Outstanding Supporting Actress in a Miniseries or a Movie	Dash and Lilly	Nominated
2000	American Comedy Awards	Funniest Female Guest Appearance in a Television Series	Frasier	Nominated
2003	Satellite Awards	Best Supporting Actress – Motion Picture	Tadpole	Nominated
2024	Drama Desk Awards	Outstanding Featured Performance in a Musical	Cabaret	Won
2024	Tony Awards	Best Featured Actress in a Musical	Cabaret	Nominated
2024	Outer Critics Circle Awards	Outstanding Featured Performer in a Broadway Musical	Cabaret	Nominated
