= Jamaica and the International Monetary Fund =

Jamaica joined the International Monetary Fund (IMF) in February 1963 under the leadership of The Rt. Hon. Sir Alexander Bustamante, one year after the country's independence. From 1963 to 1966, Rt. Hon. Sir Donald Sangster served as Jamaica's governor to the IMF and World Bank, and represented Jamaica during delegations held at the IMF and World Bank's Washington D.C. headquarters. In 1963, the IMF made its first loan to Jamaica ever, in the amount of 10 million SDR's. In 1967, Sir Donald Sangster was elected as Jamaica's second Prime Minister, simultaneously serving as Minister of Finance and Minister of Defense.

Moreover, Jamaica played a pivotal role in hosting the 1976 IMF Interim Committee in Jamaica, during the IMF's changing role within the Bretton Woods system that, in 1944, had previously been established after World War II. In a letter to President Ford, William E. Simon highlighted the major revisions of the Bretton Woods system that took effect as a result of the ratification of the Jamaica Accords. The Jamaica Accords focus was to abolishment of the Gold Standard that the Bretton Woods System had previously established. In order to create a more stable international monetary system, the Jamaica Accords served to create a more versatile foreign exchange rate that focused on a floating foreign exchange rate. In addition to the abolishment of the Bretton Woods system, a secondary meeting was held in Jamaica that helped the Development Committee to refocus on developing countries financial problems within the International Monetary System. In conclusion, this meeting established the implementation of expanded access to IMF resources through a Trust Fund in order to create more support for developing countries.

== IMF SBA's and EFF's with Jamaica ==
Since its membership with the IMF, Jamaica has used the IMF resources consistently, and taken advantage of the availability of loans provided in order to help improve the standard of living, and economic stability of the country. Jamaica and the IMF have entered into a total of sixteen arrangements. In 1963, the IMF approved the first Stand-By Arrangement with Jamaica. The total amount disbursed by the IMF stand-by arrangement was 10 million SDR's, which Jamaica could use if necessary, however; Jamaica did not use any money provided by the loan, and it expired in 1964. In the following years, Jamaica entered into two additional stand-by arrangements, the first in 1973, and the second in 1977. Under the leadership of Prime Minister Michael Norman Manely, who served two terms as prime minister (1972-1980, and 1989-1992) on a platform of democratic socialism. The stand-by arrangement of 1973 was approved in the amount of 26,000 SDR's, and the second was approved in the amount of 64 million SDR's, of which; Jamaica only withdrew a total of 13.25 million SDR's, and 19.2 million SDR's respectively. In June of the following year (1978), June 1979, and April 1981, Jamaica entered into three separate Extended Fund Facility (EFF) agreements, which permitted Jamaica to repay its outstanding loan over a longer period of time due to economic factors that prevented the country from following the originally planned repayment plan. These factors might include balance of payments imbalances due to conflicting structural procedures, or slow economic growth due to internal balance of payments weaknesses. EFF's allow a country to continue developing its internal structural integrity in order to strengthen economic growth without being too burdened by the costs of repayment.

In 1984, Jamaica began a new stand-by arrangement under the leadership of The Most Hon. Edward Phillip George Seaga who ran as the leader the Jamaican Labour Party in 1980, and won the seat as Jamaica's Prime Minister.

== Current (2018) Relations with IMF ==
As of 2018, Jamaica is joined in a constituency with Antigua, Barbuda, The Bahamas, Barbados, Belize, Canada, Dominica, Grenada, Ireland, St. Lucia, St. Kitts and Nevis, St. Vincent and the Grenadines. Together, this IMF constituency has a total of 170,118 Special Drawing Rights (SDR's) votes and the percent total of the constituency fund amounts to 3.38%. This constituency has been headed by Executive Director Louise Levonian from Canada, and Alternate Executive Director Anne Marie McKiernan from Ireland since mid-2018. Jamaica, on the other hand has a total quota of 382.9 million SDR's and has 5,294 total SDR votes equivalent to 0.11% of the total vote. Furthermore, Jamaica has a potential claim, also known as a Special Drawing Rights, of 155.55 million SDR's available for immediate withdrawal without conditionality. Up until December 2018, Jamaica has increased its quota reserves eleven times throughout its membership with the IMF. Jamaica's initial quota was in the amount of US$20,000, which was allocated to the IMF in February 1963. Subsequently, Jamaica has increased its quota shares in 1966 (twice), and again in 1969, 1970, 1978, 1980, 1984, 1992, 1999, and in 2016. As of today, Jamaica has an outstanding (unpaid) loan in the amount of 528.78 million SDR's.

== See also ==
- Jamaica and the World Bank
- Debt-trap diplomacy#The IMF and the World Bank
- Life and Debt
