= David Frankel =

American film director (born 1959)

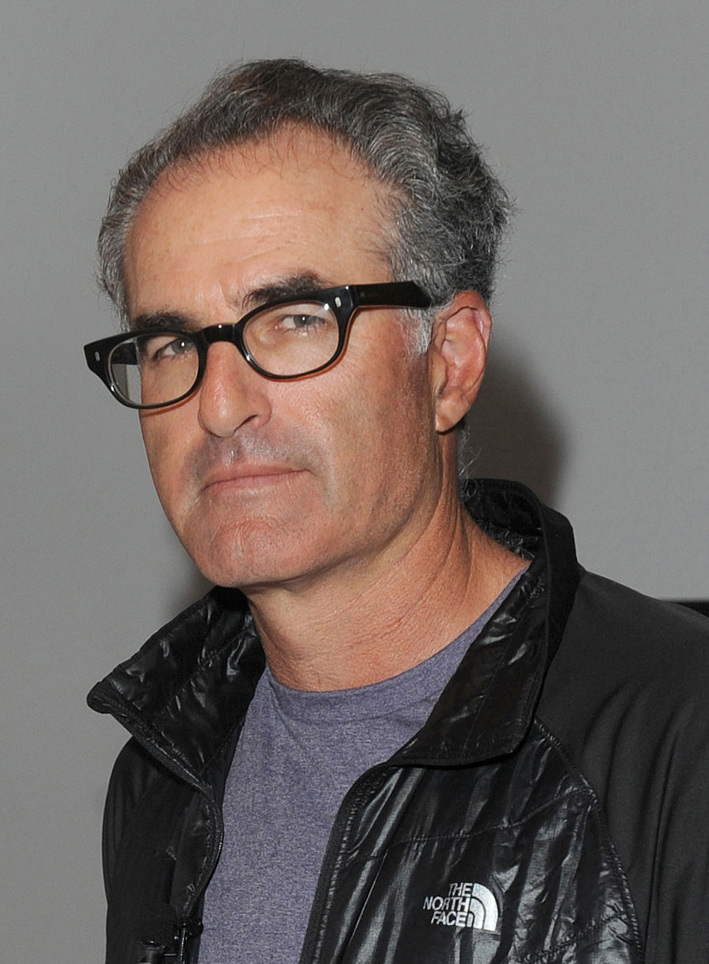
- Frankel at a CFC Masterclass, November 2011
- Born: April 2, 1959 (age 67); New York City, U.S.
- Education: Harvard University
- Occupations: Director; screenwriter; producer
- Years active: 1984–present
- Father: Max Frankel
- Relatives: Joyce Purnick (stepmother)

David Frankel (born April 2, 1959) is an American filmmaker. He directed the feature films The Devil Wears Prada (2006), and its sequel, The Devil Wears Prada 2 (2026), Marley & Me (2008), Hope Springs (2012), and Jerry & Marge Go Large (2022). On television, his most notable directing works include the pilot episode of the NBC TV series Manifest (2018), the seventh and ninth episodes of the HBO miniseries Band of Brothers (2001), and the first and fourth episodes of the Netflix miniseries Inventing Anna (2022).

== Early life ==
Frankel was born to a Jewish family in New York City. He is the son of Tobia Simone (née Brown) and New York Times columnist Max Frankel. His younger brother is TV journalist Jon Frankel. Frankel graduated from Harvard University with a bachelor's degree in 1981.

== Career ==
Frankel won the Academy Award for Best Live Action Short Film for his 1996 short film Dear Diary and an Emmy for Outstanding Directing for a Comedy Series for the pilot episode of Entourage (2004) and has since directed the studio films The Devil Wears Prada (2006), Marley & Me (2008), and Hope Springs (2012). His birdwatching comedy The Big Year, starring Steve Martin, Owen Wilson, JoBeth Williams and Jack Black, was released in October 2011. He directed the 2022 film Jerry & Marge Go Large, starring Bryan Cranston and Annette Bening.

== Personal life ==
As of 2008, he lives in the Coconut Grove section of Miami.

== Filmography ==
=== Film ===
| Year | Title | Director | Writer | Producer |
|---|---|---|---|---|
| 1990 | Funny About Love | No | Yes | No |
| 1992 | Nervous Ticks | No | Yes | No |
| 1995 | Miami Rhapsody | Yes | Yes | Yes |
| 2006 | The Devil Wears Prada | Yes | No | No |
| 2008 | Marley & Me | Yes | No | No |
| 2011 | The Big Year | Yes | No | No |
| 2012 | Hope Springs | Yes | No | No |
| 2013 | One Chance | Yes | No | No |
| 2016 | Collateral Beauty | Yes | No | No |
| 2022 | Jerry & Marge Go Large | Yes | No | No |
| 2026 | The Devil Wears Prada 2 | Yes | No | No |

Executive Producer

- The Short Game (2013) (Documentary)
- Chronically Metropolitan (2016)

=== Short film ===
| Year | Title | Director | Writer | Notes |
|---|---|---|---|---|
| 1996 | Dear Diary | Yes | Yes | Academy Award for Best Live Action Short Film |
| 2002 | Just Like You Imagined | Yes | No | |

=== Television ===
| Year | Title | Director | Executive Producer | Writer | Notes |
|---|---|---|---|---|---|
| 1992 | Grapevine | Yes | Yes | Yes | Also creator |
| 2001 | Band of Brothers | Yes | No | No | 2 episodes |
| 2001–2003 | Sex and the City | Yes | No | No | 6 episodes |
| 2002 | The Pennsylvania Miners' Story | Yes | No | No | TV movie |
| 2004 | Entourage | Yes | No | No | 2 episodes |
| 2005 | Rome | No | No | Yes | Episode: "Pharsalus" |
| 2018 | Manifest | Yes | Yes | No | Episode: "Pilot" |
| 2019 | The Morning Show | Yes | No | No | 2 episodes |
| 2020 | The Baker and the Beauty | Yes | Yes | No | 2 episodes |
| 2022 | Inventing Anna | Yes | Yes | No | 2 episodes |
| 2023 | The Irrational | Yes | Yes | No | Episode: "Pilot" |
