= Life and Debt =

2001 film by Stephanie Black

- Directed by: Stephanie Black
- Written by: Jamaica Kincaid
- Produced by: Stephanie Black
- Narrated by: Belinda Becker
- Cinematography: Kyle Kibbe; Richard Lannaman; Alex Nepomniaschy; Malik Hassan Sayeed
- Edited by: John Mullen
- Distributed by: New Yorker Films; (USA); Axiom Films; (UK and Ireland)
- Release date: April 22, 2001
- Running time: 86 minutes
- Country: United States
- Language: English

Life and Debt is a 2001 American documentary film directed by Stephanie Black. It examines the economic and social situation in Jamaica after globalization, and specifically how the International Monetary Fund and the World Bank's structural adjustment policies have impacted the island.

== Synopsis ==
Life and Debt is a 2001 United States documentary film directed by Stephanie Black about the economic and social situation in Jamaica after globalization, specifically the impact of International Monetary Fund (IMF) and the World Bank's policies. It starts with the essay "A Small Place" by Jamaica Kincaid. The IMF loans were conditional on structural adjustment policies, which required Jamaica to enact major economic reforms, including trade liberalization, privatization, and deregulation. Reforms were not successful and left Jamaica with $4.6 billion in debt.

The film features a number of interviews with former Jamaican Prime Minister Michael Manley, in which he critiques the system of International Financial Institution loans. He is particularly critical of required structural adjustments as an attack on the sovereignty of many former colonial nations and suggests the system is akin to imperialism or neocolonialism. He also criticizes the Jamaican Free Zones as U.S.-subsidized sweatshops. The film itself interviews several of the free zone workers.

== Cast ==
- Belinda Becker as the Narrator
- Michael Manley
- Buju Banton
- Stanley Fischer
- Yami Bolo
- Jerry Rawlings
- Michael Witter
- David Coore
- Jean-Bertrand Aristide
- Bill Clinton (archive footage)
- Horst Kὅhler (archive footage)

== Soundtrack ==
Life and Debt (2001) by Stephanie Black
| No. | Title | Writer(s) | Length |
|---|---|---|---|
| 1. | "G-7" (Performed by Ziggy Marley and the Melody Makers) | David Marley |
| 2. | "One Love" | Bob Marley |
| 3. | "Work" | Bob Marley |
| 4. | "Three Little Birds" | Bob Marley |
| 5. | "One Love ( The Wailers Original Version)" | Bob Marley |
| 6. | "One Love Remix" (Remix by Bill Laswell) | Bob Marley |
| 7. | "No Woman, No Cry" (Performed by Dean Fraser) | Vincent Ford Bob Marley |
| 8. | "Circumstances" | Buju Banton |
| 9. | "Destiny" | Buju Banton |
| 10. | "Zimbabwe" (Performed by Dean Frasier) | Bob Marley |
| 11. | "Fortunes of Love" | Suzanne Couch & Brian Jobson |
| 12. | "Chantilly Lace" | J.P. Richardson |
| 13. | "Filthy" | H. Browne |
| 14. | "Give Them A Ride ( Morgan Heritage Remix)" (Performed by Sizzla) | Miguel Collins Bobby Dixon Clement Dodd |
| 15. | "Day-O (The Banana Boat Song)" (Harry Belafonte) | Irving Burgie William Attawy |
| 16. | "Life and Debt" (Performed by Mutabaruka) | Allan Hope |
| 17. | "Island in the Sun" | Irving Burgie & Harry Belafonte |
| 18. | "Be Still Babylon" | Rolando E. McLean |
| 19. | "Fools Die" | Peter Tosh |
| 20. | "Raid the Barn" (Performed by Anthony B.) | Richard Bell |

== Awards ==
- 2004 Festival International du Film Insulaire, Ole de Groix, Special Jury Prize
- 2004 Paris Human Rights Film Festival, Special Jury Prize.
- Cineambiente Int. Environmental Film Fest. 2002 Teen Jury Best Film of Festival, Turin, Italy
- One World 2002-Prague Human Rights Film Festival-Audience Award Best Film of the Festival
- One World Media Awards-Finalist, International Premier Award, England
- Best Documentary at the Jamerican Film Festival
- Critics Jury Award, Honorable Mention “Best Film of the Festival” Independent Feature Project/West Los Angeles Film Festival

== Reception ==
Roger Ebert, a film critic for the Chicago Sun-Times, gave the movie a three out of four-star rating and described it as "a harsh indictment, but persuasive".

On Rotten Tomatoes the film has an approval rating of 90% based on reviews from 42 critics.

On June 15, 2001, Stephen Holden of The New York Times, wrote a review titled "ILM REVIEW; One Love, One Heart, Or a Sweatshop Economy?", in which he describes the film as a powerful documentary. He says that "The movie offers the clearest analysis of globalization and its negative effects that I've ever seen on a movie or television screen".

On February 26, 2003, Jamie Russell from the BBC gave it a four out of five-star rating and described the movie as brilliant. She explains that Stephanie Black's hits toward the tourism industry and lack of options to change the situation leaves audiences with nothing more than simply being angry about everything.

On March 25, 2003, Andrew Pulver of The Guardian gave it four out of five stars. He stressed the importance of the movie and explained that anyone with any interest in globalization should watch it. He describes it as "a detailed, poignant examination of Jamaica's parlous economic plight".
