= Praedial larceny =

Theft of agricultural products

Praedial larceny is the theft of agricultural produce. While such theft is almost universal, this term is primarily used in the Caribbean region where it is widely acknowledged to be a practice negatively impacting development of agriculture.

== The costs of praedial larceny ==
Praedial larceny of crops, livestock, and fish and seafood (including the products of aquaculture) results in farmers and fishers suffering heavy losses, making them reluctant to invest. USAID has noted that praedial larceny "robs legitimate producers, stifles incentives for farming entrepreneurs and, adversely affects the poor". Furthermore, it acts as a strong disincentive for younger people to stay on the land, which is also a worldwide problem.

A Caribbean-wide study by FAO found that 98% of all producers surveyed had experienced produce theft, amounting to over 300,000 fisherfolk families and well over a million crop and livestock farmers. More than 90% of those interviewed agreed that it was the single greatest disincentive to investment in agriculture. Praedial larceny is no longer just a petty crime but something that is conducted on a large scale. According to FAO, thefts have involved truckloads of bananas, a field of pineapples, or the contents of an aquaculture pond. Some aquaculture farmers have closed down their business because of heavy losses and high security costs.

In addition to its economic consequences, praedial larceny also has implications for food safety. There is a minimum time between application of a pesticide and when the produce can be harvested. While farmers usually follow the recommendations, persons stealing a crop usually have no idea when the farmers applied the chemicals, thereby potentially endangering the lives of people who end up buying the produce.

== Possible solutions ==
Most Caribbean governments have passed legislation intended to protect against praedial larceny but this has been relatively unsuccessful. Steps taken have included farmer and trader registration, limits on the times when products can be transported, the requirement for traders to issue receipts and keep copies, steps to address traceability, a Praedial Larceny Offenders Registry, and a Praedial Larceny hotline. In Saint Vincent and the Grenadines, for example, farmers are required to be registered and issued with an ID Card, to place an identification mark on all agricultural produce or livestock being transported, to ensure the identification of the goods can be easily seen by the police, and to always be able to produce a valid farmers’ ID card, a seller’s certificate, and a receipt or other acceptable explanation for being in possession of the goods. But such measures have received little support in the Caribbean, from either farmers or the authorities and have had little impact. The use of heavy fines has been advocated in Jamaica but the detection rate is very low rendering the threat of fines meaningless. Community policing by the farmers has possibilities as strangers can be monitored. Building fences can also offer some protection, although some farmers find the cost of these to be too high.

Attention is now being paid to the potential for ICTs to be used to protect against praedial larceny. Applications to be considered have included one to enable the police in Jamaica to more easily verify information, such as the crops the farmer is registered as growing, provided by those transporting crops. The application permits a database query related to the farmer’s identification number.
