= Petroleum Corporation of Jamaica =

- Industry: Energy (oil and gas)
- Founded: 1975
- Headquarters: Kingston, Jamaica
- Owner: Government of Jamaica
- Subsidiaries: Petroleum Company of Jamaica Limited; Petrojam Ethanol Limited; Petrojam Limited; Wigton Windfarm Limited; Jamaica Aircraft Refueling Services Limited
- Website: www.pcj.com

For the Dutch shortwave radio station see PCJJ

Petroleum Corporation of Jamaica (PCJ) was a petroleum company owned by the government of Jamaica. The PCJ had the exclusive right to explore for oil in Jamaica.

== History ==
The Petroleum Corporation of Jamaica was established in 1975 as State Energy Corporation under the Ministry of Mining and Energy and changed its name in 1979 by the Petroleum Act.

The company built its headquarters during the 1980s. The building was inaugurated in 1987 and described as a "very energy efficient" building.

In 2005, PCJ launched its first formal licensing round on 4 onshore blocks (Negril, Santa Cruz, Portland, Windsor) and 20 offshore blocks (1 to 20).

In January 2015, PCJ's Wigton Windfarm signed a contract with the Spanish company Gamesa Corporación Tecnológica for the construction of a wind turbine installation with a capacity of 24MW for the wind park Wigton III. In May 2018, PCJ completed its first offshore 3D seismic survey. This survey was financed by a grant from the US Trade and Development Agency (USTDA). The ships conducting the survey were Polarcus Adiras. In March 2018, Petrojam signed a memorandum of understanding with the Mexican Institute of Petroleum to grow bilateral trade opportunities around hydrocarbures and renewable energy.

In January 2019, the government of Jamaica backed out of a decade-long deal with Venezuela' s PDVSA that involved letting Petroleum of Venezuela acquire 49% of Petrojam, after the sanctions applied by the Trump administration on Venezuela in 2017. In June 2019, PDVSA sued the Jamaican government for the expropriation of its 49% stake in Petrojam. The Jamaican government responded that Petrojam is wholly owned by PCJ and belonged to Jamaica.

In early September 2019, the PCJ confirmed the discovery of a third live oil seep on its soil. Officials said the discovery did not hold promising commercial prospects, but this discovery confirmed the country had soils that produced oil and expelled it to the surface. Many oil seeps had been discovered in the country (both on land and offshore) since 2015. The government had previously denied those discoveries. This oil seep was the country' s oldest to date, identified to come from a 160-million-year-old source rock.

In September 2019, the Jamaican Ministry of Mining and Energy decided to shut down the PCJ without providing a reason. A few days later, the government confirmed the plan to subsume the PCJ into the Ministry of Mining and Energy to increase cost-efficiency and better maneuver the country's energy sector. Its closure date was set on 31 March 2020.

== Subsidiaries ==
- Petrojam Ethanol Limited
- Petroleum Company of Jamaica Limited
- Wigton Windfarm Limited
- Petrojam Limited
- Jamaica Aircraft Refueling Services Limited (Joint Venture between Air BP and Petrojam Limited)

== Controversies ==
In 2010, a scandal hit PCJ when it was leaked that Trafigura, which trades the Jamaican oil on the international market, had made a deposit of $30 million on the bank account of People's National Party's Colin Campbell. This scandal led the government to dissolve the board of PCJ in August 2010.

In 2018, Transparency International published the 2018 Corruption Perception Index (CPI) in which auditors listed many major issues regarding the governance and the finances of the company, including high levels of unaccountable oil losses. This situation was also reported by the Ministry of Energy, which had led the general manager of Petrojam to step down in July 2018. In January 2019, the Foreign Trade Minister also stated that Petrojam had not filed an annual report since 2008.

== See also ==
- Economy of Jamaica
