= Jamaican Free Zones =

Government free trade zone initiative in Jamaica

The Jamaican Free Zones are a government free trade zone initiative in Jamaica. Designed to encourage foreign investment and international trade, businesses operating within these zones have no tax on their profits, and are exempted from customs duties on imports and exports (capital goods, raw materials, construction materials, and office equipment) and import licensing requirements. They must export 85 percent of their products outside the Caribbean Community (CARICOM).

== Free trade zones ==
There are five Jamaican Free Zones:

- Kingston Free Zone (KFZ) in Kingston was established in 1976 on land adjacent to the Kingston Container Terminal. It was the first free zone established in Jamaica. The 180,000 square metres (1,900,000 sq ft) site contains 72,835 square metres (783,990 sq ft) of factory space.
- Montego Bay Free Zone (MBFZ) in Montego Bay was established in 1985 on a 95-acre (38 ha) site southwest of the city. It has 488,110 square feet (45,347 m^{2}) of factory/office space. An additional 103,000 square feet (9,600 m^{2}) of space is being added specifically for information technology.
- Garmex Free Zone
- Hayes Free Zone
- Cazoumar Free Zone

Kingston and Montego Bay Free Zones are government owned, while Cazoumar is privately owned.

Companies outside the zones can apply for free zone status as Single Entity Free Zones. Created under the Jamaica Export Free Zones Act, the zones are operated by the government. The zones were initially used to promote textile manufacturing and related industries. The program has been expanded to include information technology, with addition clauses added to the act in 1996. Businesses that operate in the zones must be in the fields of manufacturing, warehousing and storage, distribution, processing, refining, assembly, packaging, or service operations.

From 1985 to 1995 the combined export output of the zones in textiles was US$1.31 billion. Around 12,000 people were employed in the textile factories, about 1.6 percent of the total workforce. Since 1995 the industry has been in a serious depression due to structural problems in Jamaica and increased foreign competition.

World Trade Organization rule changes agreed at the Doha Development Round will end export subsidies in 2007.

The free zones have been criticized as United States of America-subsidized sweatshops. The 2001 documentary film Life and Debt features interviews with free zone workers, as well as with several prominent critics such as Michael Manley (the former Prime Minister of Jamaica), that support this view.

== See also ==
- Entrepôt, The USA import materials to the free zone, which is then assembled in Jamaica.
- Maquiladora, similar duty and tariff-free factories in Latin America.
