= Stephanie Black =

American filmmaker

Stephanie Black is an American documentary film director and producer. She resides in New York City.

Her award-winning film works include H-2 Worker, which documents the more than 10,000 Caribbean men brought to Florida each year under a temporary guestworker "H-2" visa to harvest sugar cane for American sugar corporations. The film won Best Documentary Award and Best Cinematography Awards at Sundance Film Festival in 1990. Life and Debt (2001), on the impact the International Monetary Fund, World Bank and Inter-American Development Bank and current globalization policies have had on the economic development of Jamaica, won widespread recognition, including a Critics Jury Award at the Los Angeles Film Festival.

In 2008, Stephanie Black produced and directed "Africa Unite", a feature-length musical documentary on Bob Marley's 60th birthday celebration in Addis Abbaba, Ethiopia for the Marley family.

Stephanie Black has directed live-action documentary segments for Sesame Street and episodes of the reality television series Being Bobby Brown. She also produced for the children's shows U to U, Big Bag, and Zoom.
