= Dan Finnerty =

American actor, comedian and singer

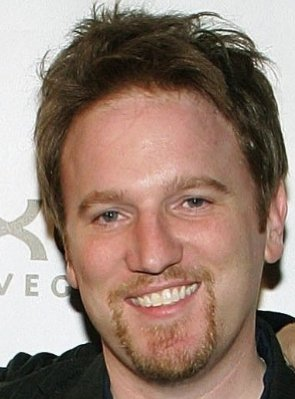
- Finnerty in 2009
- Born: Rochester, New York, U.S.
- Education: Emerson College
- Occupations: Actor; singer
- Years active: 1995–present
- Spouse: Kathy Najimy (m. 1998)
- Children: Samia
- Website: www.thedanband.com

Dan Finnerty is an American actor and singer.

== Early life ==
Finnerty was born in Rochester, New York, and grew up in the small town of Bath, New York. He attended Emerson College in Boston. He was a member of the hit off-Broadway show Stomp in New York City.

== Career ==
He is the lead singer of the cult hit comedy group he created called The Dan Band, which Entertainment Weekly dubbed "the hottest ticket in Hollywood." The live show was filmed in Los Angeles as a one-hour concert special Dan Finnerty & The Dan Band: I Am Woman on the Bravo channel, directed by McG and executive produced by Steven Spielberg.

Finnerty gained fame for his foul-mouthed rendition of "Total Eclipse of the Heart" as the wedding singer at Will Ferrell's wedding in the movie Old School, directed by Todd Phillips. Phillips continued to feature Dan, as the sleazy bat-mitzvah singer in Starsky & Hutch and again as the irreverent wedding singer in The Hangover. After seeing The Dan Band, Steven Spielberg cast him in The Terminal and signed on to executive produce his comedy special.

Finnerty originated the role of Lonny in the world premiere of "Rock of Ages" in Los Angeles along with Kyle Gass from Tenacious D and made a cameo appearance in the film version of "Rock of Ages" as the tour manager for Stacee Jaxx played by Tom Cruise.

He appeared over 15 times as a comedy correspondent on "The Jay Leno Show" and The Tonight Show with Jay Leno.

"The Dan Band" has released three albums:

The Dan Band Live, the full-length CD of his live show released by Side One Dummy Records.

Ho. A Dan Band Xmas, featuring all original holiday songs, with videos for "I Wanna Rock U Hard This Christmas" featuring Florence Henderson from The Brady Bunch making the moves on Santa at a retirement home, as well as the anthemic "Please Don't Bomb Nobody This Holiday," featuring celebrity cameos including Sheryl Crow, Christina Applegate, Nicole Scherzinger, Kyle Gass from Tenacious D, Neil Patrick Harris, Meg Ryan, Donald Faison, Macy Gray, Christopher Guest, Cheri Oteri, Rachael Harris, Kathy Najimy, Nia Vardalos, Ian Gomez, Nathan Fillion, Ricki Lake, Michael Johns, Janeane Garofalo, Lauren Tom, Gia Carides and Matthew Perry.

The Wedding Album, released 2015 through Comedy Dynamics includes collaborations with Nicole Scherzinger, Rob Thomas, Bridget Everett, Nuno Bettencourt and TRAIN.

The Dan Band appeared numerous times on The Tonight Show with Jay Leno, Jimmy Kimmel Live!, The Late Late Show, Last Call with Carson Daly' and as the house band on The Ellen DeGeneres Show, Pajama Party, and Spike TV's Spike Guys' Choice Awards. Finnerty also wrote and performed the finale song for the final season of Last Comic Standing.

In March 2017, AT&T announced that Finnerty would appear in advertisements for DIRECTV during March Madness, co-starring with Greg Gumbel. The spots feature Finnerty performing the Aerosmith song "I Don't Want to Miss a Thing", with lyrics tailored to each scene (generally people at work while tournament games are on).

He recently appeared in the Netflix film Dumplin' starring Jennifer Aniston as pageant host Eugene Reed, performing the song "Look At Her" which he co-wrote with American Idol musical director Michael Orland.

== Personal life ==
In August 1998, he married actress Kathy Najimy, with Gloria Steinem officiating the ceremony. The couple has one daughter, musician Samia, born December 1996.

== Filmography ==
=== Film ===
Year	Title	Role	Notes
1998	Cosmo's Tale	Purse Snatcher	
2000	Lost Souls	Technical Director	
2000	Leaving Peoria	Bob	Short film
2001	The Wedding Planner	Best Man	
2001	Ca$hino	Dramatization Johnny	Short film
2002	The Princess and the Pea	Prince Rollo (singing voice)	
2003	Old School	Wedding Singer	
2004	Starsky & Hutch	Bat Mitzvah Singer	based on the television series
2004	The Terminal	Discovery Store Manager	
2008	Extreme Movie	Gigundocock	
2009	I Hate Valentine's Day	Grouchy Guy	
2009	The Hangover	Wedding Singer	also co-sung "Candy Shop" for the film's soundtrack
2011	A Great Catch	SWAT Captain	Short film
2011	Bench Seat	Bartender	Short film
2012	Rock of Ages	Tour Manager – Stacee	
2018	Dumplin'	Eugene Reed	
2021	Single All the Way	Kevin the Snow Plow Guy	
2022	Forty Winks	Vernon Whitaker	
2022	Hocus Pocus 2	Lucas	
2023	Family Switch	Gus	
2025	Atrabilious	Levi Whitaker	

=== Television ===
Year	Title	Role	Notes
1995	The Tonight Show with Jay Leno	Stomp	2 episodes
1996	Ellen	Doorman	Episode: "No So Great Expectations"
1997	American Experience	Clarence McNeil	Episode: "Gold Fever"
1997	Veronica's Closet	Pizza Guy	Episode: "Veronica's Not Happy About the Book"
1997	Meego	Dave	Episode: "Fatal Attraction"
1998	Ellen	Crew Member Dan / Dan	Episode: "Ellen: A Hollywood Tribute (Part 1 & 2)"
1998	Any Day Now	Guy	Episode: "It's Who You Sleep With"
1998–2000	Rude Awakening	Joe the Bartender	Recurring role; 6 episodes
2000	Two Guys, a Girl and a Pizza Place	Himself / Musical Guest	Episode: "Bridesmaid Revisted"
2000	Pajama Party	Dan	unknown episode
2003	The Dan Show	Dan Kennedy	Television Movie; also executive producer
2004	My Life as a Teenage Robot	Singer (voice)	Episode: "A Robot for All Seasons"
2005	King of the Hill	Darryl (voice)	Episode: "It' Ain't Over 'Til the Fat Neighbor Sings"
2005	The Life and Times of Juniper Lee	Singer	Episode: "Enter Sandman"
2009	Random! Cartoons	Wallo (voice)	Episode: "The Bravest Warriors"
2014	The Mysteries of Laura	Sad Sack	"Pilot" uncredited
2016	Graves	unknown role	Episode: "That Dare Not Speak"
2022	That's My Jam	Himself	1 episode
