= In the Dark Night of the Soul It's Always 3:30 in the Morning =

- The Morning Show episode
- Episode no.: Season 1 Episode 1
- Directed by: Mimi Leder
- Written by: Kerry Ehrin; Jay Carson
- Cinematography by: Michael Grady
- Editing by: Carole Kravetz Aykanian
- Original release date: November 1, 2019
- Running time: 63 minutes

Guest appearances
- Janina Gavankar as Alison Namazi; Brett Butler as Sandy Jackson; Tom Irwin as Fred Micklen

Episode chronology
← Previous —	Next → "A Seat at the Table"

"In the Dark Night of the Soul It's Always 3:30 in the Morning" is the series premiere of the American drama television series The Morning Show, inspired by Brian Stelter's 2013 book Top of the Morning. The episode was written by series developers Kerry Ehrin and Jay Carson, and directed by executive producer Mimi Leder. It was released on Apple TV+ on November 1, 2019, the same day when the service was launched.

The series follows the characters and culture behind a network broadcast morning news program, The Morning Show. After allegations of sexual misconduct, the male co-anchor of the program, Mitch Kessler, is forced off the show. It introduces Mitch's co-host Alex Levy, and a conservative reporter Bradley Jackson, who attracts the attention of the show's producers after a viral video.

The series premiere received mixed reviews from critics; while the cast received praise, some criticized the writing. For the episode, Jennifer Aniston received a nomination for Outstanding Lead Actress in a Drama Series at the 72nd Primetime Emmy Awards.

== Plot ==
In New York City, executive producer Charlie "Chip" Black (Mark Duplass) is called at 3am, where he is informed about a story that will soon be reported on UBA's morning news program, The Morning Show. He contacts the show's co-anchors Mitch Kessler (Steve Carell) and Alex Levy (Jennifer Aniston), but Alex ignores his calls. As she arrives to work, she is informed of the news.

The story reveals that Mitch has been fired from TMS following multiple allegations of sexual misconduct. Alex is furious with Chip for keeping her in the dark about UBA's internal investigation on Mitch. After consulting with Cory Ellison (Billy Crudup), the CEO of UBA, Alex hosts the show by herself. She delivers a speech where she expresses solidarity with the victims, although some executives express concern that her statement is too sympathetic towards Mitch. In West Virginia, young "conservative" reporter Bradley Jackson (Reese Witherspoon) becomes an internet viral sensation after a video of her angrily fact-checking a coal mine supporter at a protest is posted on social media. When her boss complains over her actions, Bradley decides to quit.

As Mitch consults with his team over his next move, his wife Paige (Embeth Davidtz) tells him that she will divorce him. Cory flies from Los Angeles to New York to discuss the scandal with Chip, with their conversation revealing that they were planning to replace Alex with a new host. At her house, Bradley is visited by Hannah Shoenfeld (Gugu Mbatha-Raw), TMS's head talent booker; Hannah invites her to New York City to discuss the video with Alex, which Bradley tentatively agrees to. Alex is skeptical about Bradley's claim that she was unaware of being filmed and uses the interview to question Bradley's political views, as she worked for a conservative station. Bradley reiterates she is on "the human side", and that she simply wants to do a good job in delivering transparent news.

That night, Alex secretly visits Mitch at his house, confronting him for ruining their healthy image. Mitch maintains that the encounters were consensual. As Alex leaves, Mitch informs her that UBA wanted to replace her as co-anchor as they were losing in ratings to a competitor network, but Alex refuses to believe him. Bradley prepares to leave back for West Virginia, when she is called by an impressed Cory, who wants to meet with her to talk about her future.

== Development ==
=== Production ===
The episode was written by series developers Kerry Ehrin and Jay Carson, and directed by executive producer Mimi Leder.

=== Writing ===
Ehrin joined the series in April 2018, taking over Carson as showrunner. While Carson is credited for the episode, Ehrin said she did not read his script, and started from scratch, managing to write the pilot in three weeks, "I knew I had to write quickly, and when you have something in your head that is perhaps not working, it can really gum you up for weeks. But, no, Apple didn't have the characters drawn up. I was told very little. I didn't work from the previous writer's script. I didn't have a pilot. It was really terrifying when I think about it."

== Critical reviews ==
"In the Dark Night of the Soul It's Always 3:30 in the Morning" received mixed reviews from critics. Maggie Fremont of Vulture gave the episode a 3 star rating out of 5 and wrote, "I feel like everyone was expecting this to be the next big prestige drama (not unwarranted, the show certainly thinks it is Very Important), but let's call it what it is, at least in this episode: a well-produced, well-acted primetime soap. Or, like, whatever-time soap—streaming, amirite? And I say that not as a dig, but as someone who lives for soapy dramas."

Jodi Walker of Entertainment Weekly wrote, "There are a few stirring songs played throughout The Morning Show's hour-plus premiere, but the real soundtrack of Apple TV's most expensive dip into the crowded original programming pond is the sound of vibrating cell phones and yelling... lots of yelling." Meaghan Darwish of TV Insider wrote, "Described as exploring the “cutthroat world of morning news and the lives of the people who help America wake up in the morning,” the streaming drama's characters shape the previously vague story into something relevant from the minute the show begins."

Esme Mazzeo of Telltale TV wrote, "It's a perfectly fine cup; cream and a little bit of sugar if you want it. Exactly what you expect and nothing more. That's disappointing news to report with the likes of Jennifer Aniston, Reese Witherspoon, and Steve Carell at the helm, and considering this is the series Apple has put at the front of the line when introducing Apple TV+. We deserve an extraordinary cup of coffee." Joel Keller of Decider wrote, "The first episode really gave us a shrug. Not that the episode, directed by Mimi Leder, didn't look great or have some fine performances, but it felt like a lot of set up and very little story."

=== Awards and accolades ===
Jennifer Aniston submitted the episode to support her nomination for Outstanding Lead Actress in a Drama Series at the 72nd Primetime Emmy Awards. She would lose to Zendaya for Euphoria.
