= A Seat at the Table (The Morning Show) =

- The Morning Show episode
- Episode no.: Season 1 Episode 2
- Directed by: Mimi Leder
- Story by: Kerry Ehrin; Jay Carson
- Teleplay by: Kerry Ehrin
- Cinematography by: Michael Grady
- Editing by: Carole Kravetz Aykanian
- Original release date: November 1, 2019
- Running time: 55 minutes

Guest appearances
- Marcia Gay Harden as Maggie Brener (special guest star); Mindy Kaling as Audra Khatri (special guest star); Janina Gavankar as Alison Namazi; Brett Butler as Sandy Jackson; Tom Irwin as Fred Micklen

Episode chronology
← Previous "In the Dark Night of the Soul It's Always 3:30 in the Morning"	Next → "Chaos Is the New Cocaine"

"A Seat at the Table" is the second episode of the American drama television series The Morning Show, inspired by Brian Stelter's 2013 book Top of the Morning. The episode was written by series developer Kerry Ehrin from a story co-written by her and Jay Carson, and directed by executive producer Mimi Leder. It was released on Apple TV+ on November 1, 2019, the same day when the service was launched.

The series follows the characters and culture behind a network broadcast morning news program, The Morning Show. After allegations of sexual misconduct, the male co-anchor of the program, Mitch Kessler, is forced off the show. It follows Mitch's co-host, Alex Levy, and a conservative reporter Bradley Jackson, who attracts the attention of the show's producers after a viral video. In the episode, Alex fights to keep her co-host position, while Bradley receives an offer.

The episode received mixed reviews from critics, particularly for its writing and Mitch's characterization, although Jennifer Aniston received high praise for her performance.

== Plot ==
Bradley (Reese Witherspoon) meets with Cory (Billy Crudup) for dinner, where he expresses interest in her research. He offers her the chance to secure a field correspondent position at The Morning Show, getting her in contact with Chip (Mark Duplass). However, Chip feels that her ideas and stories do not fit with the show's uplifting nature, leading Bradley to lambast him.

Yanko Flores (Néstor Carbonell), the show's meteorologist, is pursuing a secret relationship with production assistant Claire Conway (Bel Powley); Yanko and Claire are hesitant to reveal their relationship to HR, due to Mitch's recent controversies. TMS's rival show, Your Day America, announces that they have secured an interview with one of Mitch's victims. Hannah (Gugu Mbatha-Raw) decides to visit the victim, Ashley Brown (Ahna O'Reilly), convincing her that conducting the interview at UBA would be more impactful. Mitch (Steve Carell) is informed by his lawyer that he will not receive any more payment from UBA for violating his contract, and he refuses to sell some of his properties to stay afloat. Mitch later tries to schedule meetings with reporters to reveal his side of the story; Chip confronts Mitch at his house, asking him not to continue ruining the image of the show.

Alex (Jennifer Aniston) is in the middle of contract negotiations while temporarily co-hosting the show with Daniel Henderson (Desean Terry), the weekend edition host. Knowing the network needs her to stabilize the show following Mitch's departure, Alex tries to leverage the situation by demanding co-host approval, and she pressures Chip to fight for her terms. Alex later attends a ceremony to receive the Leadership in Journalism Award, where Cory forces Bradley to sit alongside Alex. Alex tells Cory that she will quit if she is not given co-host approval, but Cory is unfazed. When she receives her award, Alex delivers a speech proclaiming that things will change and suddenly announces that Bradley will be her co-host, shocking the staff.

== Development ==
=== Production ===
The episode was written by series developer Kerry Ehrin from a story co-written by her and Jay Carson, and directed by executive producer Mimi Leder. This was Ehrin's second writing credit, Carson's second writing credit, and Leder's second directing credit.

=== Casting ===
The episode includes a guest appearance by Mindy Kaling. Reese Witherspoon said that she recommended her after previously collaborating with her in many projects, including A Wrinkle in Time. She said, "the part was just perfect for her. We were like, ‘Would you really do this?’ And she was like, ‘Yeah, that sounds like so much fun!’ So she came and played and gave us some of the greatest one-liners."

== Critical reviews ==
"A Seat at the Table" received mixed reviews from critics. Maggie Fremont of Vulture gave the episode a 3 star rating out of 5 and wrote, "Sure, in the end, Mitch makes the right decision to not ruin Alex's big night by showing up at the ceremony — he gets as close as donning his tux and sitting in his car outside the venue — but it still seems hard to imagine buying any type of redemption arc for this guy."

Jodi Walker of Entertainment Weekly wrote, "The Morning Show isn't quite adding up to the series its star power suggests it could be just yet, but hot damn, can it roll out a string of compelling moments."

Esme Mazzeo of Telltale TV wrote, "The issue that sets Bradley's journey in motion may seem like a small detail. But it's indicative of The Morning Show's biggest problem — it never chooses to be polarizing. It wants to tell every side of every story, but it's a TV show about a news program, not an actual news program." Joel Keller of Decider wrote, "The second episode, where Corey hires Bradley over Chip's objections, and then sitting her with Alex at a reception where Alex is getting a women in journalism award, was more cohesive and displayed Aniston's still-impressive comedic abilities, as well as the chemistry she and Witherspoon have had since Reese played Rachel's little sister on Friends."
