= Atrabilious =

- Release poster
- Directed by: William Atticus Parker
- Written by: William Atticus Parker
- Produced by: William Atticus Parker; Sabina Friedman-Seitz
- Starring: Leon Addison Brown; Whoopi Goldberg; Alec Baldwin; Jeffrey Wright; Mark Boone Junior; Lewis Black; Evan Jonigkeit; Joel de la Fuente; David Pittu
- Cinematography: William Atticus Parker
- Edited by: William Atticus Parker
- Music by: Iain Condron
- Production company: River Styx Productions
- Distributed by: Buffalo 8
- Release date: July 17, 2023
- Running time: 100 minutes
- Country: United States
- Language: English
- Budget: $20,000

Atrabilious is a 2023 American comedy mystery thriller film written and directed by William Atticus Parker, in his second directorial effort, and starring Leon Addison Brown, Whoopi Goldberg, and Alec Baldwin.

== Cast ==
- Leon Addison Brown as Steven Joyner
- Whoopi Goldberg as Andrea Hart
- Alec Baldwin as Proctor Carlisle
- Jeffrey Wright as Vincent Daugherty
- Mark Boone Junior as Eduard Gillespie
- Lewis Black as Roy Altman
- Evan Jonigkeit as Raphael Clearwater
- Joel de la Fuente as Mark Nava
- David Pittu as Dominick Calderon
- Andy Karl as Greg Meyers
- Ward Horton as Miles Zimmerman
- Hunter Parrish as Milo Kramer
- Brooks Ashmanskas as Todd Jenkins
- Dan Finnerty as Levi Whitaker
- Brandon Burton as Neil Joyner
- Steven Maier as Bradley Atkinson

== Production ==
Filming wrapped in October 2022. The film was shot in New York City. Collider compared the "A-class" casting of the film and its "minuscule budget" to those of the still-teenager director's first feature effort, Forty Winks.

== Release ==
The film was released on Amazon Prime in the United States on July 18, 2025.

== Reception ==
The film has an 83% rating on Rotten Tomatoes based on six reviews.

Bobby LePire of Film Threat rated the film a 9.5 out of 10 and wrote, "But if one doesn’t mind some odd moments, then Parker’s motion picture will scratch that neo-noir itch in the best possible way."

Michael Talbot-Haynes, also of Film Threat, rated the film a 7 out of 10 and wrote, "Sure, Atrabilious has flaws and shortcomings, but the promise shown here is unmistakable."

High on Films wrote it was "[a]n intriguing premise marred by lackluster execution". Another review praised the "gritty" atmosphere of the film but admitted the plotline could be confusing.
