= Yummy (Gwen Stefani song) =

2006 promotional single by Gwen Stefani featuring Pharrell

Promotional single by Gwen Stefani featuring Pharrell

from the album The Sweet Escape
- Released: November 11, 2006
- Recorded: July 2005
- Studio: South Beach (Miami, Florida); Record Plant (Hollywood, California)
- Genre: Dance-pop
- Length: 4:57
- Label: Interscope
- Songwriters: Gwen Stefani; Pharrell Williams
- Producer: The Neptunes

"Yummy" is a song written and performed by American singer Gwen Stefani featuring American musician Pharrell Williams from Stefani's second solo studio album, The Sweet Escape (2006). The track was released on November 11, 2006, as a promotional single for the parent album's release through Interscope Records. It was developed during several sessions in Miami, Florida, and Hollywood, California, in July 2005, for an intended EP or as extra tracks on Stefani's video album Harajuku Lovers Live (2005). The song was produced by the Neptunes (Williams and Chad Hugo). Musically, the collaboration is a dance-pop recording with a "day-glo" rap. Its lyrics deal with food, sexual intercourse, and the roles that an individual may have within a household.

"Yummy" divided music critics, with some praising its minimalistic production, leaving others to find it too simple, in addition to criticizing its lyrics. It was often compared to Kelis' 2003 single "Milkshake". The track was performed during Stefani's The Sweet Escape Tour in 2006, where she entered the stage alongside two keyboard musicians. More recently, the singer sang a rendition of it as part of a melody, known as the "Harajuku Medley", during her MasterCard Priceless Surprises promotional events in 2015 and 2016.

== Background and composition ==
After the release of Love. Angel. Music. Baby. in 2004, Stefani originally intended to return to No Doubt and start recording tracks for their upcoming and untitled sixth studio album, which would later become Push and Shove (2012). Instead, Pharrell Williams convinced her to record several more songs in Miami, Florida and Hollywood, California in July 2005, for a possible extended play (EP) or as bonus tracks on her live album Harajuku Lovers Live. "Wind It Up" and "Orange County Girl" were re-recorded after being originally featured during Stefani's 2005 Harajuku Lovers Tour, while tracks "U Started It", "Breakin' Up", "Candyland", and "Yummy" were developed for the singer's second album. On November 11, 2006, "Yummy" was released as a promotional single on CD and 12-inch format, with both containing the instrumental, an a cappella version, and either the radio edit or album version.

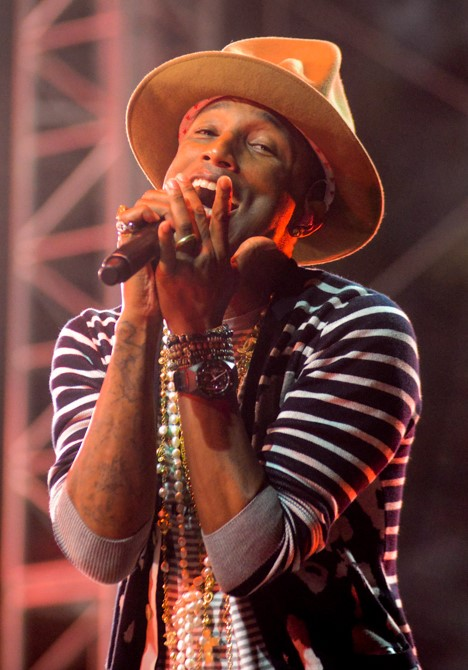
Pharrell co-wrote and executively produced "Yummy".

In an interview with the Billboard in January 2014, where Stefani discussed her then-upcoming third studio album, she stated that "Yummy" was among her favorites from her discography. She also revealed that she had wanted "Yummy" to be released as a commercial single:

Those lyrics are crazy. I listen to that like, 'What was she doing?' Pharrell's just so creative, I remember back then, and he's always kind of been the same. He's always so positive and so sure and he never wants to repeat himself. Like, 'How can I make something different and new and not like anything else?' I look back at that whole record, and I think, 'Wow I wish there was more time to do more singles.' You only get so many things that people hear.

"Yummy" was written by Stefani and Pharrell Williams, while The Neptunes handled the track's production. Its style can be described as dance pop that contains a day-glo rap. As described by Mark Pytlik from Pitchfork, the song "mov[es] from a skeletal rhythmic backbone and resound[s a] 'Milkshake'-pitching triangle into a spiraling melody line that sounds like a Sherman Brothers outtake". Writing for Slant Magazine, Sal Cinquemani also compared it to Kelis' 2003 single "Milkshake", and stated it "finally gives a name to Pharrell's percussive minimalism". The recording opens with a "subdued, subtle and quiet atmosphere", while the outro consists of "scary and demented circus music", which serves as a "voyage into a mechanic's shop". Stefani discusses roles of a homemaker in the lyrics, singing: "I know you've been waiting but I've been out making babies" and "Man, there's so much heat beneath these clothes / It's time to make you sweat". Food imagery is continually mentioned in its lyrics, which Quentin B. Huff, writing for PopMatters, saw as an imitation of "Milkshake". The chorus consists of a "serious" and repetitive coo, where she sings "I'm feeling yummy head to toe".

== Critical reception ==
Upon release, the song received generally mixed reviews. Pytlik of Pitchfork applauded "Yummy" by calling it the "Best Song" on the parent album. Slant's Cinquemani complimented Williams' minimalistic production on the track, and believed that it "would have made a far less divisive choice for a first single", referring to "Wind It Up" being the lead single from The Sweet Escape. Christina Fuoco-Karasinski from the former website LiveDaily enjoyed the song, calling it "delicious". Scott M. Baldwin from Sputnikmusic was mixed in his review of the parent album and stated that "Yummy" is "one of the dumbest sex songs ever written". He disliked the singer's lyrics as well, calling them "the worst lyrics Stefani has written", but praised Williams' production, calling it "just fantastic" and "a brilliant contrast". Amanda Murray from the same website also was mixed, calling it "random-bullshit-friendly".

Robert Christgau labeled the song as a "choice cut", signifying that it "is a good song on an album that isn't worth your time or money". Alex Miller from NME disapproved, claiming that the "clueless Fergie possesses Stefani for [...] the woefully oddball 'Yummy'", while Norman Mayers from Prefix opined that it was "bizarre". While comparing the five The Neptunes-produced tracks on the album, Stephen Thomas Erlewine of AllMusic found it to be "rather embarrassing" and "cloying and crass", rather than "effortless and effervescent". Lucy Davies, writing for BBC Music, described it as a "bland filler" that "sums her up [as] coquettish, amusing, annoying and hip wiggling in equal measure".

== Live performances ==
Stefani included the song on the setlist for her 2007 world concert tour entitled The Sweet Escape Tour. For the show's rendition, the singer walked upon a moving walkway alongside two keyboard players; Fuoco-Karasinski compared the introduction to that of Jamiroquai. The recording was also played during Stefani's fashion shows. At the promotional concert series MasterCard Priceless Surprises Presents Gwen Stefani, the song was performed as a part of a "Harajuku Medley", consisting of the songs "Harajuku Girls", "Don't Get It Twisted", "Now That You Got It", and "Bubble Pop Electric", and the aforementioned song. The medley contained J-pop and disco elements, and served as a "virtual sonic tour of Stefani's many stylistic identities".

== Track listings ==
- US promotional CD single
1. "Yummy" (Radio edit) – 3:54
2. "Yummy" (Instrumental) – 3:53
3. "Yummy" (A cappella version) – 3:39
- US promotional 12-inch single

A1. "Yummy" (Album version) – 4:57
B1. "Yummy" (Instrumental) – 3:53
B2. "Yummy" (A cappella version) – 3:39

== Credits and personnel ==
Management

- Pharrell appears courtesy of Virgin Records American, Inc.
- Recorded at South Beach Studios, Miami, Florida and Record Plant, Hollywood, California

Personnel

- Gwen Stefani – lead vocals, songwriter
- The Neptunes - producer
- Pharrell Williams – guest vocals
- Andrew Coleman – recording
- Brian Garten - recording
- Kingston James McGregor Rossdale – additional vocals
- Ryan Kennedy – vocal editing
- Phil Tan - sound mixing

Credits adapted from the liner notes of The Sweet Escape, Interscope Records.

== Release history ==
Region	Date	Format	Label	Ref.
United States	November 11, 2006	CD single	Interscope	
United States	November 11, 2006	12-inch single	Interscope	
