= Priceless (advertising campaign) =

Marketing activity by MasterCard

- Logo of MasterCard when the campaign was introduced
- Agency: McCann Erickson
- Client: Mastercard
- Market: Worldwide
- Release date: 1997
- Slogan: There are some things money can't buy. For everything else, there's Mastercard.

External videos
- MasterCard priceless baseball (commercial, 1997) on YouTube (30 seconds)

Priceless is an advertising campaign by Mastercard that started in 1997 and makes use of the slogan "There are some things money can't buy; for everything else, there's Mastercard". It has provided Mastercard with a constant and recognizable message. The advertisements, which generally revolve around a given theme, list the cost of some related products or services (usually three of them) before listing a fourth, intangible concept, which is valued as "priceless", before the announcer reads the slogan.

== History ==
The first of these Priceless ads was run during the 1997 World Series. There were numerous different TV, radio and print ads. Mastercard registered Priceless as a trademark. Actor Billy Crudup has been the voice in the US market; actor Jack Davenport was the voice in the UK. The original idea and concept of the campaign stems from the advertising agency of McCann Erickson (as it was named in 1997).

The purpose of the campaign is to position Mastercard as a friendly credit card company with a sense of humor, as well as responding to the public's worry that everything is being commodified and that people are becoming too materialistic.

=== Lawsuit ===
In 1994, Argentinian born Edgardo Apesteguía created an ad campaign in Paraguay for Bancard's credit card. Its slogan was "There are things money can't buy, but, for everything else, there is Bancard". Plagiarism lawsuits were filed in Paraguay and Chile against Mastercard and their publicist McCann, who registered the "priceless" slogan ads in the US in 1999 and was represented in Paraguay by Nafta and Biedermann publicists at the time.

=== Parodies ===
Many parodies have been made using this same pattern, especially on Comedy Central, though Mastercard has threatened legal action, contending that such parodies are a violation of its rights under the federal and state trademark and unfair competition laws, under the federal and state anti-dilution laws, and under the Copyright Act. Despite these assertions, however, US consumer advocate and presidential candidate Ralph Nader won (after a four-year battle) in the suit Mastercard brought against him after he produced his own "Priceless" political commercials. In the election ads Nader had criticized the corporate financing of both the Bush and Gore campaigns. Using the theme and some of the language behind the Mastercard "Priceless" campaign the election specified the dollar amounts contributed by corporate interests to both candidates and then summed it up with "finding out the truth ... priceless". Mastercard sued Nader's campaign committee and filed a temporary restraining order to stop the ads. The TRO was not granted and Nader defended the ads by claiming they were protected under the fair use doctrine.

In 2002, a video was published where a boy was having a private conversation with his girlfriend in front of her parents house, while accidentally holding his hand on the intercom. Some sources argued that MasterCard may be behind the video.

In 2011, WikiLeaks founder Julian Assange published a parody video in response to their assets being frozen.

== See also ==
- MasterCard Priceless Surprises Presents Gwen Stefani
