= Chaos Is the New Cocaine =

- The Morning Show episode
- Episode no.: Season 1 Episode 3
- Directed by: David Frankel
- Written by: Erica Lipez
- Cinematography by: David Lanzenberg
- Editing by: Vikash Patel
- Original release date: November 1, 2019
- Running time: 53 minutes

Guest appearances
- Marcia Gay Harden as Maggie Brener (special guest star); Martin Short as Dick Lundy (special guest star); Janina Gavankar as Alison Namazi; Tom Irwin as Fred Micklen

Episode chronology
← Previous "A Seat at the Table"	Next → "That Woman"

"Chaos Is the New Cocaine" is the third episode of the American drama television series The Morning Show, inspired by Brian Stelter's 2013 book Top of the Morning. The episode was written by co-executive producer Erica Lipez, and directed by David Frankel. It was released on Apple TV+ on November 1, 2019, the same day when the service was launched.

The series follows the characters and culture behind a network broadcast morning news program, The Morning Show. After allegations of sexual misconduct, the male co-anchor of the program, Mitch Kessler, is forced off the show. It follows Mitch's co-host, Alex Levy, and a conservative reporter Bradley Jackson, who attracts the attention of the show's producers after a viral video. In the episode, Alex faces opposition from the network after announcing Bradley as the new co-host, while Mitch wants a friend's help in telling his side of the story.

The episode received mixed reviews from critics, but Billy Crudup received high praise for his performance. For the episode, Billy Crudup won Outstanding Supporting Actor in a Drama Series at the 72nd Primetime Emmy Awards.

== Plot ==
Cory (Billy Crudup) responds to reporters over the new announcement that Bradley (Reese Witherspoon) will be the new co-host, and he surprises the staff by stating that she will start working on Monday. TMS producer Mia Jordan (Karen Pittman) asks Chip (Mark Duplass) to assign her as Bradley's producer, and announces her new role before he has officially offered it to her. Network president Fred Micklen (Tom Irwin) is furious over Alex's announcement, but Cory explains that Bradley's presence should boost the ratings and clean their image, after which they will fire Alex (Jennifer Aniston) for the May Sweeps. Alex is brought before the UBA board to explain her decision, but she uses it to instead call them out, boldly warning them she cannot be fired as the country will be on her favor. She further reiterates that things will now be done in her own way.

When his own staff quits, Mitch (Steve Carell) decides to work on a documentary that examines the MeToo movement from the perspective of accused men. He enlists a colleague, disgraced director Dick Lundy (Martin Short), who has his own history of sexual misconduct. However, Mitch is disturbed when Lundy complains about the idea of consent after revealing he had sex with a minor. When Mitch brings up two separate waves of the movement, Lundy remarks that Mitch is part of the problem, even if Lundy himself is worse.

While Mia prepares Bradley for her first screen test, Chip promises Daniel (Desean Terry) that he will get the co-host position when either Alex or Bradley leave. Bradley is still undecided over accepting the job and underwhelms during her first camera tests, leading Cory to pick out a new wardrobe for her; Cory and Bradley get to know each other in the process. Meanwhile, Alex prepares to conduct the interview with Ashley, but Chip informs her that it would not be appropriate for her to do it, given that she worked closely with Mitch for years. Alex is enraged, but ultimately relents after being pressed by Mia, who is implied to have had an affair with Mitch. Realizing that Alex handed Ashley's interview to her, Bradley confronts her, but Alex reassures that she believes in her. The following morning, Bradley arrives for her first day. Before the show, Alex whispers in her ear, "Don't fuck it up."

== Development ==
=== Production ===
The episode was written by co-executive producer Erica Lipez, and directed by David Frankel. This was Lipez's first writing credit, and Frankel's first directing credit.

=== Writing ===
The episode introduces a button found in Mitch's dressing room, which shuts the door to the dressing room. This is inspired by Matt Lauer, who was fired from Today after an investigation into sexual misconduct accusations, and Lauer also had a button that would close the door. Kerry Ehrin explained, "We went back and forth. But ultimately, I've known so many people who have had those buttons in their offices and I didn't realize they could be used in different contexts. It seemed like a real thing that happens in the world."

=== Casting ===
While the series is inspired by real-life people, Martin Short mentioned that his character is not modeled after a specific person. Short sought a basis, but never specified what directors he based it on, "maybe not even obvious choices, maybe someone who is an accomplished director, but hasn't been #MeToo’d, or is indeed a predator. So you can apply one to the other imagining how he might feel were he suddenly brought down."

== Critical reviews ==
"Chaos Is the New Cocaine" received mixed reviews from critics. Maggie Fremont of Vulture gave the episode a 3 star rating out of 5 and wrote, "Alex walks into the studio and grabs Bradley's hand, everything Bradley wanted — but it's only so she can lean in and whisper these words of comfort in her new co-host’s ear: “Don't fuck it up.” You guys, this is exciting."

Jodi Walker of Entertainment Weekly wrote, "A bomb was dropped in the final moments of The Morning Show's second episode, and in the third, it's time to face the fallout. For most of that fallout, we still have no idea why Alex decided to up and name Bradley as her new co-host in front of a bunch of reporters, basically forcing the network to hire her. But it's starting to seem like Alex may just share Cory's sentiment that, ahem, chaos is the new cocaine."

Esme Mazzeo of Telltale TV wrote, "By the end of The Morning Show Season 1 Episode 3, things seem to be heading in an interesting direction — but I'm not confident enough to use the word exciting." Joel Keller of Decider wrote, "the show is funny enough and moves along well enough, and the three A-listers' performances are compelling enough, that this is likely the only Apple TV+ show introduced so far that we'll watch all the way through."

=== Accolades ===
Billy Crudup submitted the episode to support his nomination for Outstanding Supporting Actor in a Drama Series at the 72nd Primetime Emmy Awards. He wound up winning the award, becoming the first actor from the series to win an Emmy.

Martin Short was also nominated for Outstanding Guest Actor in a Drama Series, losing to Ron Cephas Jones for This Is Us.
