= The Ballad of G.I. Joe =

2009 film

- Directed by: Daniel Strange
- Written by: Daniel Strange; Kevin Umbricht
- Based on: G.I. Joe: A Real American Hero by Hasbro
- Produced by: Mike Farah; Josh Simpson; Kevin Umbricht
- Starring: Laz Alonso; Alexis Bledel; Billy Crudup; Zach Galifianakis
- Cinematography: Maarten de Boer
- Edited by: Daniel Strange; Kevin Umbricht
- Music by: Daniel Strange; Kevin Umbricht
- Production company: Cha-Ching Pictures
- Distributed by: Funny or Die
- Release date: August 2009
- Running time: 4 minutes
- Country: United States
- Language: English

The Ballad of G.I. Joe is a musical comedy parody short film released in 2009 on the website Funny or Die. Written by Daniel Strange and Kevin Umbricht, it spoofs several characters from G.I. Joe: A Real American Hero by showing what they do in their spare time.

== Plot ==
The song The Ballad of G.I. Joe is sung as the video looks into the lives of various Joe characters when they are off duty, showing that their private lives are quite different from their 'Joe' personas.

== Cast ==
- Laz Alonso as Doc
- Alexis Bledel as Lady Jaye
- Billy Crudup as Zartan
- Zach Galifianakis as Snow Job
- Tony Hale as Dr. Mindbender
- Vinnie Jones as Destro
- Joey Kern as Tomax and Xamot
- Chuck Liddell as Gung-Ho
- Julianne Moore as Scarlett
- Robert Remus as Sgt. Slaughter
- Henry Rollins as Duke
- Alan Tudyk as Shipwreck
- Olivia Wilde as Baroness
- Jamin Fite as Cobra Commander
- Frankie Kang as Storm Shadow
- Geoff Mann as Buzzer
- Andreas Owald as Snake Eyes
- Daniel Strange as Torch
- Kevin Umbricht as Ripper

== Reception ==
Web Worker Daily wrote that for Funny Or Die, "knowing a ton of celebrities is half the battle for attracting eyeballs to its viral videos." While offering that the song The Ballad of G.I. Joe is "just okay", the film itself was enjoyable for seeing "celebs dressed like Joe characters." G4TV called the short "a creative accomplishment" which "contains a plethora of cameos that need to be seen to be believed", and wrote that "The Ballad of G.I. Joe is nothing less than total win." I09 noted that the G.I. Joe movie led to numerous viral videos, and offered that The Ballad of G.I. Joe was the best.
