= MasterCard Priceless Surprises Presents Gwen Stefani =

2015–16 concert tour by Gwen Stefani

- Concert by Gwen Stefani
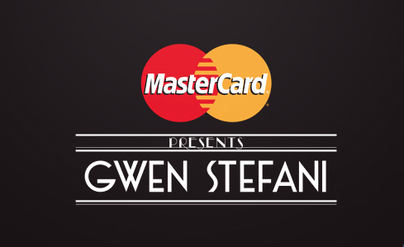
- Promotional banner for the concert
- Start date: February 7, 2015
- End date: March 16, 2016
- Duration: 90 minutes
- Legs: 2
- No. of shows: 2 in North America; 1 in Asia; 3 Total

Gwen Stefani concert chronology
- The Sweet Escape Tour (2007); MasterCard Priceless Surprises Presents Gwen Stefani (2015–16); This Is What the Truth Feels Like Tour (2016)

MasterCard Priceless Surprises Presents Gwen Stefani is a promotional concert tour by American singer and songwriter Gwen Stefani as part of their Priceless campaign. This became Stefani's first tour since 2007's The Sweet Escape Tour; however, tickets available for the tour were only accessible to MasterCard holders. Stefani's recent partnership with MasterCard allowed her to create a concert experience for her fans in a more intimate setting, as she did not perform in large concert venues. The shows contained material from Stefani's first two studio albums, as well as songs that would later appear on her third release, This Is What the Truth Feels Like (2016).

Each of the three shows contained different set lists. She also premiered several of her songs during these shows, including "Start a War" on February 7, 2015; "Used to Love You" on October 17, 2015; and "Misery" on March 16, 2016. Her first two American concerts, held in Los Angeles and New York City, sold out immediately after tickets were made available to cardholders. The final show took place in Tokyo. The concerts were well received for being individualized and Stefani received praise for her stage energy.

== Background ==
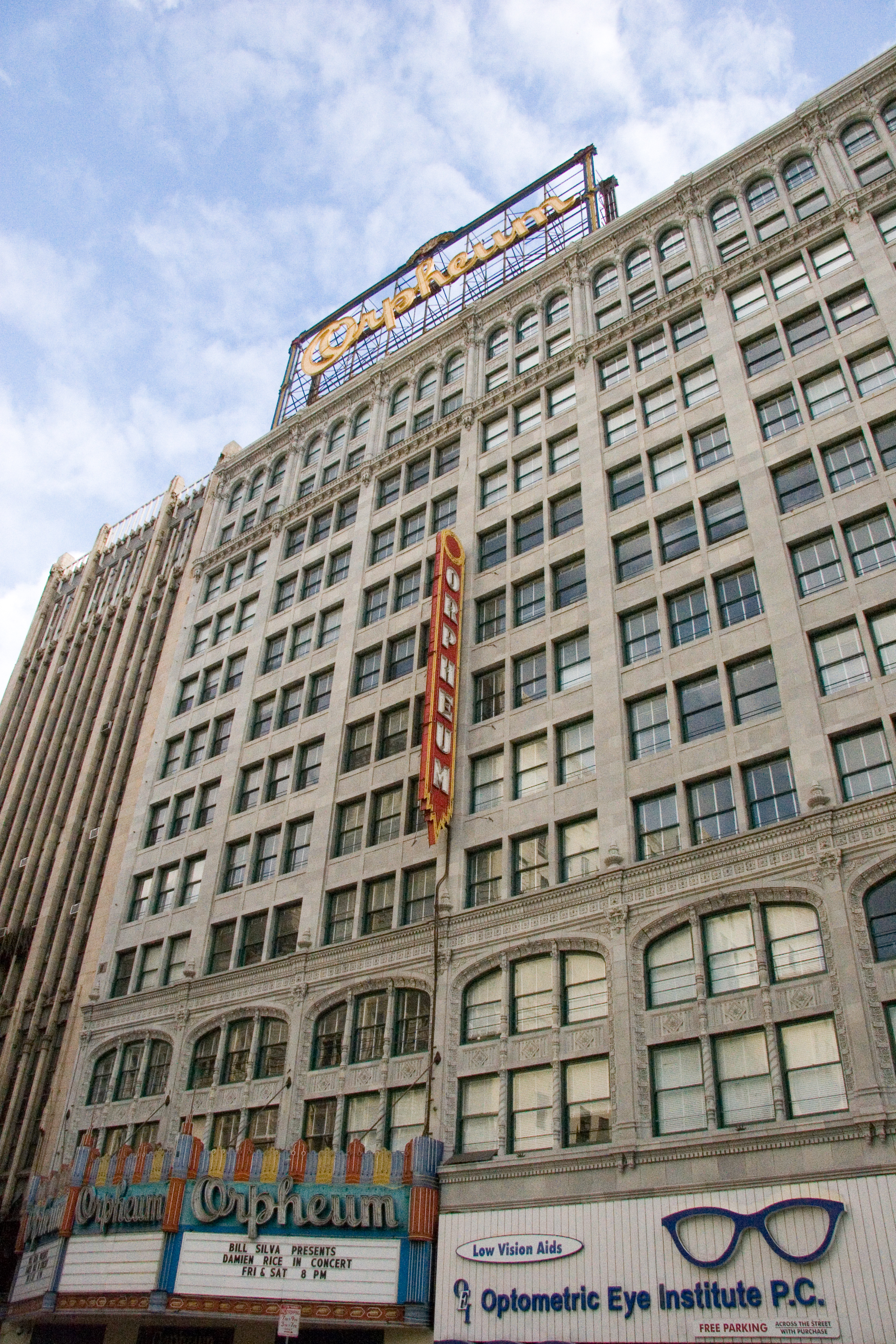
Orpheum Theatre, the location of the opening show in Los Angeles

Stefani initially announced the tour alongside a partnership with MasterCard on December 8, 2014; the partnership enabled MasterCard holders to win several prizes, including handbags, golf getaways, and concert tickets to see Stefani perform live. The collaboration began with a 30-second television commercial announcing the partnership and debuting Stefani's single, "Spark the Fire". In an interview with MasterCard regarding the concert series, Stefani said that she was "excited to be part of a collaboration that offers me the opportunity to connect and engage with fans through amazing surprises when they least expect it," further stating that she "look[s] forward to working with them to bring something truly unique to fans.”

The February 7th show opened doors to the public at 7:00 pm, but the concert itself started at 8:00 pm. Each attendee could purchase a maximum of two tickets, exclusively through Ticketmaster; the starting price for a ticket was $79. The New York City concert was announced on September 15, 2015, and was billed as a "special" event by MasterCard and Stefani herself. The show was, again, only available to MasterCard holders instead of the general public and later became sold out.

Despite the significant time gap between her last concert, MasterCard announced on February 8, 2016 that Stefani planned to perform one last show in Tokyo at the Zepp Diver City event center. During a MasterCard press release, Stefani stated that she looked forward to play fan favorites as well as a few new songs for lucky MasterCard cardholders and my most passionate Japanese fans". At the same venue, the singer premiered her single "Misery" to her fans as "a special surprise".

== Synopsis ==
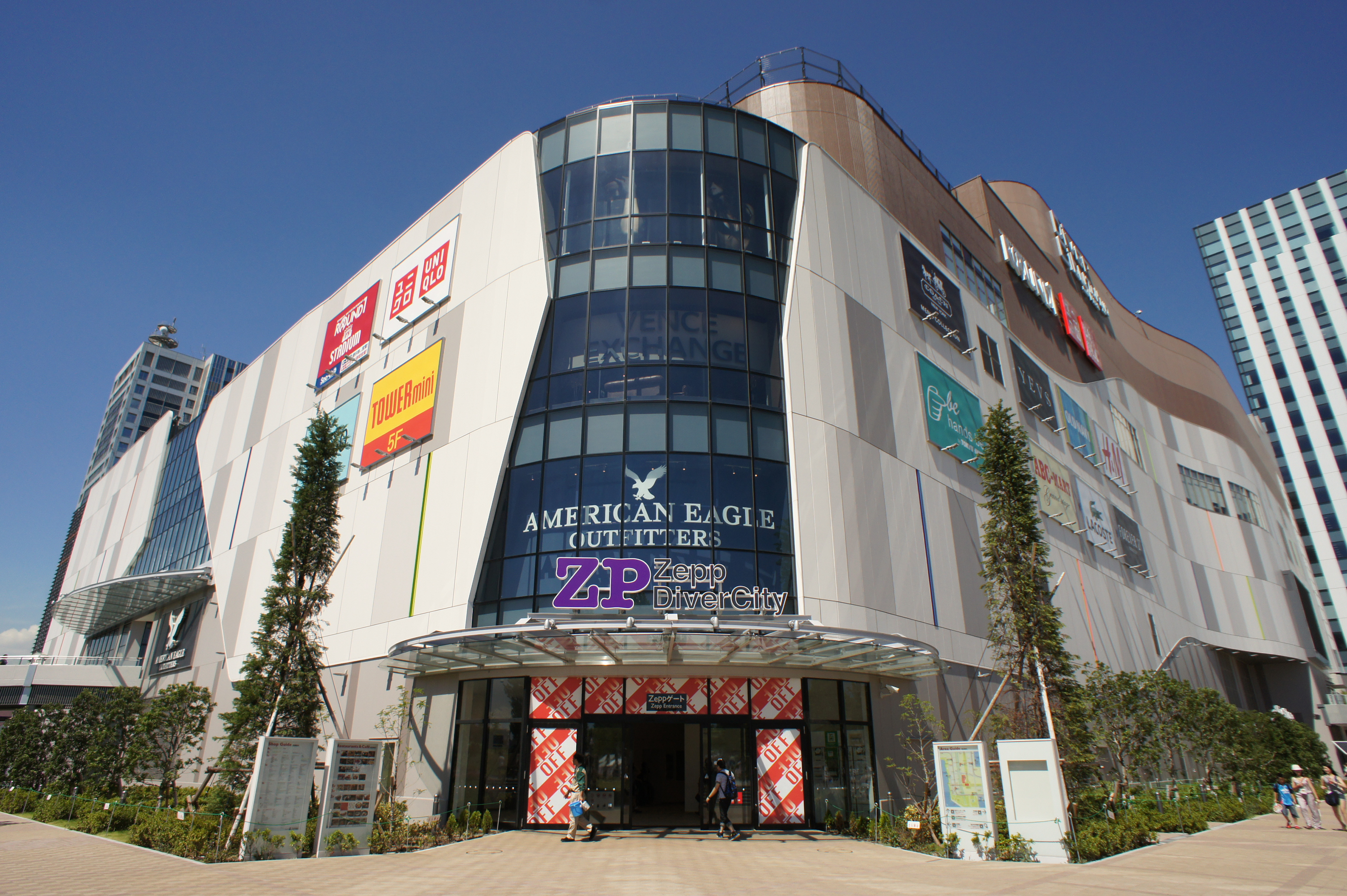
Zepp Diver City, the location of the final show in Tokyo

For the Los Angeles performance, Stefani opened the show with "Spark the Fire", her then-latest single. Immediately after performing a medley of "Harajuku Girls", "Yummy", "Don't Get It Twisted", "Now That You Got It", and "Bubble Pop Electric", Stefani debuted the previously unreleased "Start a War". During the New York and Tokyo performances, the show was opened by a performance of Stefani's 2006 single, "Wind It Up"; Stefani wore "red plaid pants, a fishnet body stocking, a cropped black beaded top, and black combat boots", which continued into the performance of "Rich Girl". During the performances of "Misery" and "Make Me Like You", Stefani wore "cropped red track pants and a red sequined cage top over a black bra" as the lyric video for "Misery" was displayed as the backdrop. In between "4 in the Morning" and "Danger Zone", Stefani shouted "these songs are taking on new meaning[s]!", referencing her recent divorce from singer Gavin Rossdale. At the Hammerstein Ballroom show, Stefani debuted her single "Used to Love You", along with the music video which was played during the background. The night ended with an encore performance of both "Hollaback Girl" and "The Sweet Escape".

== Critical reception ==
In his review of the New York City show, Andrew Hampp of Billboard praised Stefani for bringing "an arena-level production to an intimate theater." Jeffery Slonim, writing for Gotham, similarly enjoyed the performance for being "personal" and particularly favored the emotional premiere of "Used to Love You". Milos Balac of The Huffington Post was also impressed, claiming that the tour would "cement [Stefani's] status as of one of pop's reigning acts." A reviewer from Hidden Jams Music stated that the New York performance allowed Stefani to prove herself and predicted that "Used to Love You" would be "all over [the] radio soon." Reflecting on the Tokyo appearance, Thomas Hall from The Japan Times felt that Stefani "exuded just as much energy as she did the last time she performed in Tokyo in 2007". He complimented her vocals and found the impact of them comparable to the strength of the background dancers.

== Set list ==
February 7, 2015
1. "Spark the Fire"
2. "Rich Girl"
3. "What You Waiting For?"
4. "Baby Don't Lie"
5. "Cool"
6. "Together"
7. "Early Winter"
8. "Harajuku Medley" (contains elements of "Harajuku Girls", "Yummy", "Don't Get It Twisted", "Now That You Got It", and "Bubble Pop Electric")
9. "Start a War"
10. "Luxurious"
11. "4 in the Morning"
12. "The Real Thing"
13. "Danger Zone"
14. "Wonderful Life"
15. "Orange County Girl" (video interlude)
16. "Crash"
17. "U Started It"
18. "Wind It Up"
19. "Hollaback Girl"
20. "The Sweet Escape"
October 17, 2015
1. "Wind It Up"
2. "Rich Girl"
3. "Baby Don't Lie"
4. "Early Winter"
5. "Spark the Fire"
6. "Harajuku Medley" (contains elements of "Harajuku Girls", "Yummy", "Don't Get It Twisted", "Now That You Got It", and "Bubble Pop Electric")
7. "Luxurious"
8. "Crash"
9. "U Started It"
10. "The Real Thing" (contains excerpts of "Wonderful Life")
11. "Let Me Blow Ya Mind" (instrumental)
12. "Cool"
13. "Fluorescent"
14. "4 in the Morning"
15. "Danger Zone"
16. "What You Waiting For?"
17. "Used to Love You"
18. "Hollaback Girl"
19. "The Sweet Escape"
March 16, 2016
1. "Wind It Up"
2. "Rich Girl"
3. "Baby Don't Lie"
4. "Early Winter"
5. "Spark the Fire"
6. "Harajuku Medley" (contains elements of "Harajuku Girls", "Yummy", "Don't Get It Twisted", "Now That You Got It", and "Bubble Pop Electric")
7. "Luxurious"
8. "Crash"
9. "U Started It"
10. "Fluorescent"
11. "The Real Thing" (contains excerpts of "Wonderful Life")
12. "Let Me Blow Ya Mind" (instrumental)
13. "Misery"
14. "Cool"
15. "Make Me Like You"
16. "Danger Zone"
17. "What You Waiting For?"
18. "Used to Love You"
19. "Hollaback Girl"
20. "The Sweet Escape"

== Shows ==
List of concerts, showing date, city, country, venue and attendance
| Date | City | Country | Venue | Attendance |
North America
| February 7, 2015 | Los Angeles | United States | Orpheum Theatre | 2,000 / 2,000 |
| October 17, 2015 | New York City | United States | Hammerstein Ballroom | 2,200 / 2,200 |
Asia
| March 16, 2016 | Tokyo | Japan | Zepp Diver City | N/A / 2,473 |
| Total | | | | 4,200 / 6,673 |
