= William Atticus Parker =

American filmmaker and actor (born 2004)

- Born: January 7, 2004 (age 22)
- Years active: 2022–present
- Parents: Billy Crudup (father); Mary-Louise Parker (mother)

William Atticus Parker (born January 7, 2004) is an American filmmaker and actor.

== Career ==
Parker made his feature directorial debut with Forty Winks (2022), which stars Susan Sarandon and John Turturro.

He then made his second feature film, Atrabilious (2023), which stars Alec Baldwin, Whoopi Goldberg and Jeffrey Wright.

In his senior year at Bennington College, he put up a production of Midsummer, an adaptation of William Shakespeare's A Midsummer Night’s Dream.

His third directorial effort, The Auction, is currently in pre-production.

== Personal life ==
Parker is the son of Mary-Louise Parker and Billy Crudup. Shortly before Parker's birth, Crudup left Mary-Louise for actress Claire Danes. Parker's stepmother is Naomi Watts.

== Filmography ==
=== As actor ===
==== Film ====
| Year | Title | Role | Notes |
|---|---|---|---|
| 2022 | Forty Winks | Anton | Uncredited |
| 2024 | Sleuthhound Screwball | Anchorman | |
| 2025 | Atrabilious | Anton Kantoliev | |
| 2027 | Roll Camera | Benjamin Edward | |

==== Television ====
| Year | Title | Role | Notes |
|---|---|---|---|
| 2013 | Christmas in Conway | Towns Person (uncredited) | TV Movie |
| 2017 | Mr. Mercedes | Kid at Hospital #1 (uncredited) | 1 episode |
| 2018 | Compliance | Kid on Bus (uncredited) | Unsold pilot |
| 2021 | Colin in Black & White | White Teammate 2 | Miniseries |

=== As filmmaker ===
| Year | Film | Credited as | | | | | |
| Year | Film | Director | Producer | Writer | Cinematographer | Editor | Notes |
|---|---|---|---|---|---|---|---|
| 2021 | Donnybrook | Yes | Yes | Yes | Yes | Yes | Short film |
| 2022 | Forty Winks | Yes | Yes | Yes | No | No | Feature film |
| 2025 | Atrabilious | Yes | Yes | Yes | Yes | Yes | Feature film |
