= The Front Runner (film) =

2018 American film directed by Jason Reitman

- Theatrical release poster
- Directed by: Jason Reitman
- Screenplay by: Matt Bai; Jason Reitman; Jay Carson
- Based on: All the Truth Is Out: The Week Politics Went Tabloid by Matt Bai
- Produced by: Helen Estabrook; Aaron L. Gilbert; Jason Reitman
- Starring: Hugh Jackman; Vera Farmiga; J. K. Simmons; Alfred Molina
- Cinematography: Eric Steelberg
- Edited by: Stefan Grube
- Music by: Rob Simonsen
- Production companies: Bron Studios; Right of Way Films; Creative Wealth Media
- Distributed by: Columbia Pictures; Stage 6 Films (through Sony Pictures Releasing)
- Release dates: August 31, 2018 (Telluride); November 6, 2018 (United States)
- Running time: 114 minutes
- Country: United States
- Language: English
- Budget: $25 million
- Box office: $3.2 million

The Front Runner is a 2018 American political drama film directed by Jason Reitman, based on the 2014 book All the Truth Is Out: The Week Politics Went Tabloid by Matt Bai, who co-wrote the screenplay with Reitman and Jay Carson. The film stars Hugh Jackman, Vera Farmiga, J. K. Simmons, and Alfred Molina. It chronicles the rise of American Senator Gary Hart, the front-runner candidate to be the 1988 Democratic presidential nominee, and his subsequent fall from grace when media reports suggested he was having an extramarital affair.

The film premiered at the Telluride Film Festival on August 31, 2018, and was theatrically released in the United States on November 6, 2018, by Columbia Pictures. It received mixed reviews; while Jackman was praised for his performance, critics said the rest of the cast felt wasted and the film did not "dive deep enough into its central issues to make a compelling argument." The film was a box-office bomb, earning just $3.2 million against its $25 million budget.

== Plot ==
After finishing second to Walter Mondale in the 1984 Democratic Party presidential primaries, former Senator Gary Hart is now the widely accepted front-runner in the 1988 Democratic Party presidential primaries. Leading up to the formal launch of his campaign in April 1987, some of Hart's campaign staff are concerned that he won't open up about himself (letting the public "get to know him"), instead focusing on ideas and policy. Meanwhile, at The Washington Post, editors and journalists discuss whether the paper should report on Hart's marital problems and rumoured promiscuity.

After the first week of campaigning, Hart joins his friend Billy Broadhurst for a yacht cruise from Miami to Bimini on the Monkey Business, where he meets Donna Rice, a young woman. Days later at an array of pay-phones in an airport, two reporters (A.J. Parker of the Post and Tom Fiedler of the Miami Herald) overhear Hart's end of a conversation, presumably with Rice.

On the campaign plane, Hart gets to know Parker, offering paternal advice and giving the young reporter a Tolstoy novel to learn about the Soviets. Later, in Iowa, Parker offends Hart during an interview by asking whether he has "a traditional marriage". Hart responds: "You want to know what I'm doing in my spare time, A.J., is that it? Follow me around, put a tail on me. You'd be very bored."

Meanwhile, in Miami, Tom Fiedler has received an anonymous call from a young woman alleging that Hart "is having an affair with a friend of mine". Fiedler dismisses the call at first, but ends up tracking two women on a flight to Washington, D.C., and staking out Hart's townhouse, where he sees Hart go out and come back with Rice. Hart eventually notices Fiedler's car and there is a confrontation, during which Fiedler asks about the woman and Hart denies any wrongdoing and asserts that his personal life is nobody's business. Knowing the story will hit the news, Hart phones his wife, Lee Hart, and apologizes.

After the story appears in the Herald, Lee and daughter Andrea are besieged by reporters outside their home in Troublesome Gulch, Colorado. Meanwhile, in D.C., campaign staffer Irene Kelly is tasked with befriending Rice to try to get information from her, after which she sends Rice back to Miami, where her privacy is torn to shreds by the press.

Hart argues with his campaign manager, Bill Dixon, about whether to respond to the Herald story. Dixon thinks Hart needs to speak out to control the damage, but Hart vehemently argues that any response at all would legitimize the reporters' action and set a dangerous precedent.

The Post receives an anonymous package with photos taken months previous of Hart with another woman. Parker argues that reporting on this aspect of Hart's life is not good journalism, but the editor, Ben Bradlee, overrules him, indicating that they need to change with the times.

While preparing for a press conference, Hart's campaign team notes that polls show a majority of the public believes the media has gone too far in their coverage of Hart and that a candidate's marital indiscretions are irrelevant to their qualifications for being president. When told that reporters may ask whether he has ever cheated on his wife, Hart strongly retorts, "It's nobody's goddamn business!", which the team agrees is the perfect answer. Then Lee arrives, and the staff leaves. She tells Hart that she may leave him eventually, but not now.

At the press conference, it is Parker who asks whether Hart has committed adultery. Instead of giving the rehearsed answer, Hart weakly stammers that he doesn't think it is a fair question. Later, Parker asks for comment from the campaign on the anonymous photos the Post received. Seeing how upset Lee is over the public scrutiny and its negative impacts on their family, Hart drops out of the campaign.

A postscript states that "Gary and Lee Hart remain married to this day". (Note: Lee Hart passed away on April 9, 2021, which is after the film was released.)

== Cast ==
Hart Campaign

- Hugh Jackman as Gary Hart, a former senator
- Vera Farmiga as Lee Hart, Gary Hart's wife
- J. K. Simmons as Bill Dixon, Hart's campaign manager
- Mark O'Brien as Billy Shore, Hart's body man
- Molly Ephraim as Irene Kelly, (Note: A fictional or composite character) campaign scheduler
- Chris Coy as Kevin Sweeney, press secretary
- Alex Karpovsky as Mike Stratton, advance man
- Josh Brener as Doug Wilson, policy advisor
- Tommy Dewey as John Emerson, deputy campaign manager
- Kaitlyn Dever as Andrea Hart, Gary and Lee's daughter
- Oliver Cooper as Joe Trippi, deputy political director
- Jenna Kanell as Ginny Terzano, deputy press secretary

Washington Post

- Alfred Molina as Ben Bradlee
- Mamoudou Athie as A.J. Parker
- Ari Graynor as Ann Devroy
- John Bedford Lloyd as David Broder
- Spencer Garrett as Bob Woodward

Miami Herald

- Steve Zissis as Tom Fiedler
- Bill Burr as Pete Murphy
- Kevin Pollak as Bob Martindale
- Mike Judge as Jim Dunn

Miami

- Sara Paxton as Donna Rice
- Toby Huss as Billy Broadhurst, lobbyist

Traveling Press

- Jennifer Landon as Ann McDaniel

Presidential biographer and historian Jon Meacham appears in a cameo role as the moderator of a Georgetown town hall.

== Production ==
=== Development ===
Political columnist Matt Bai became interested in American Senator Gary Hart after writing a 2003 profile of him for The New York Times, and he released the book on which the film is based, All the Truth Is Out: The Week Politics Went Tabloid, in 2014.

The screenplay for the film was written by filmmaker Jason Reitman, Bai, and former Hillary Clinton press secretary Jay Carson. Reitman also produced with Helen Estabrook for Right of Way Films, and Aaron L. Gilbert produced for Bron Studios.

=== Casting ===
In June 2017, it was reported that Hugh Jackman would portray Gary Hart in The Front Runner. In August 2017, the extended cast list for the film was announced, including Vera Farmiga as Hart's wife Oletha "Lee" Hart, Kaitlyn Dever as Gary and Lee's daughter Andrea Hart, Sara Paxton as Donna Rice, Ari Graynor as journalist Ann Devroy, and J. K. Simmons as Bill Dixon, Hart's 1988 presidential campaign manager and longtime friend. The following month, Jennifer Landon and John Bedford Lloyd joined the cast in unspecified roles. In October 2017, Chris Coy was cast as press secretary Kevin Sweeney.

=== Filming ===
Principal photography began on September 18, 2017, in Georgia, with Jackman revealing the first image from the set that day. Production took place in both Atlanta and Savannah.

== Release ==
In May 2018, Sony Pictures acquired worldwide distribution rights to the film at the 71st Cannes Film Festival, with a planned awards season release. It had its world premiere at the Telluride Film Festival on August 31, 2018, and screened at the Toronto International Film Festival on September 8.

The Front Runner began its limited release on Tuesday, November 6, 2018, the first film to ever be released on Election Day in the United States. It then expanded to 22 theaters on November 16, and nationwide on November 21.

== Reception ==
=== Box office ===
The film made $6,849 from four theaters on its first day (an average of $1,712 per screen), a figure Deadline Hollywood noted as underwhelming; however, the site wrote that it is rare for a film to open limited on a Tuesday, and the film's impending opening weekend would be the true gauge of its box office strength. It ended up making $56,000 in its opening weekend (a six-day total of $76,199), which Deadline called "awful" and "really horrible when you consider that it's a limited launch of an awards contender wannabe."

During its theatrical run, The Front Runner earned $2,000,105 at the domestic box office.

=== Critical response ===
On review aggregator Rotten Tomatoes, the film holds an approval rating of 58% based on 230 reviews, with an average rating of 6.2/10; the website's critical consensus reads: "The Front Runner exhumes the wreckage of a political campaign with well-acted wit, even if it neglects to truly analyze the issues it raises." On Metacritic, the film has a weighted average score of 61 out of 100, based on 44 critics, indicating "generally favorable reviews".

=== Accolades ===
Award	Date of ceremony	Category	Recipient(s)	Result	Ref.
AACTA International Awards	January 4, 2019	Best Actor	Hugh Jackman	Nominated	
AARP's Movies For Grownups Awards	February 4, 2019	Best Actor	Hugh Jackman	Nominated	
AARP's Movies For Grownups Awards	February 4, 2019	Best Ensemble	The Front Runner	Nominated	
Hollywood Film Awards	November 4, 2018	Hollywood Actor Award	Hugh Jackman	Won	
Washington D.C. Area Film Critics Association Awards	December 3, 2018	Best Portrayal of Washington D.C.	The Front Runner	Nominated	
