= Start a War (song) =

Song by Gwen Stefani
- Recorded: February 7, 2015
- Venue: Orpheum Theatre (Los Angeles)
- Genre: Power ballad
- Length: 3:42
- Label: Interscope; Mad Love
- Songwriter(s): Gwen Stefani; Sia Furler
- Producer(s): Arnthor Birgisson

"Start a War" is an unreleased song recorded by American singer Gwen Stefani. Originally intended for her third studio album, the ballad was written by Stefani and Sia and produced by Arnthor Birgisson. Stefani said she was grateful for Sia's help with the composition. In the end, the song did not make the final cut of This Is What the Truth Feels Like, Stefani's third studio album released in 2016. The song was intended to serve as a bonus track on a CD maxi single for her 2014 single "Baby Don't Lie", although the distribution was scrapped by Interscope and Mad Love Records. After it was registered with a UPC, Universal Music Group announced that it would be issued as a standalone digital download on November 9, 2015, but these plans were also cancelled.

A power ballad, "Start a War" garnered praise for Stefani's vocals and Sia's role as a songwriter. Several music critics commended it as a typical Sia ballad and a good fit for Stefani. The track has only been performed once during a MasterCard Priceless Surprises Presents Gwen Stefani concert on February 7, 2015. The rendition was accompanied by a backdrop displaying falling feathers and featured Stefani dressed in a similar attire.

== Background and development ==
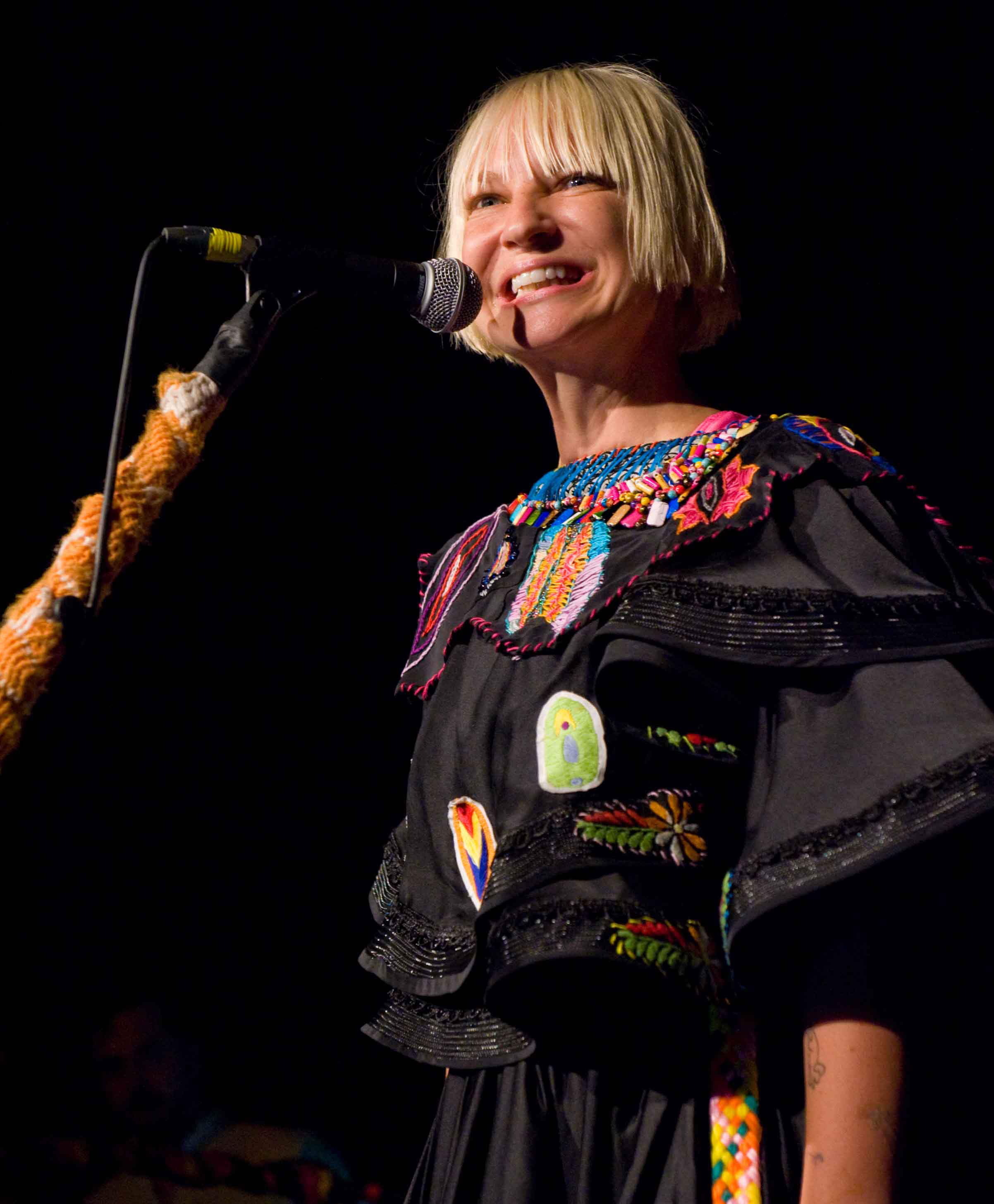
Stefani was appreciative of Sia's contributions to "Start a War".

"Baby Don't Lie", Gwen Stefani's first single since 2008's "Early Winter", was released as a digital download on October 20, 2014, in the United States. However, Stefani did not issue the single in the United Kingdom until January 11, 2015, when it was distributed to Amazon.co.uk in the same format. Because of the delay, a CD maxi single of the recording, distributed by Interscope and Benny Blanco's Mad Love Records, was scheduled for release later in 2015. The maxi single was registered with a UPC and was reportedly to include two versions of "Baby Don't Lie" along with two previously unreleased tracks - "Start a War" and "Carousel". The liner notes stated that "Start a War" was written by Stefani and Sia Furler, while Arnthor Birgisson was the sole producer. In January 2015, the British Broadcasting Corporation's Chi Chi Izundu incorrectly reported that Charli XCX had handled the songwriting for "Start a War" after the British singer discussed her involvement in Stefani's then-upcoming third album.

In December 2014 Stefani spoke of the song to Spin's Brennan Carley, when she mentioned working with Furler on the record. In the interview, she stated: "I’ve got a good start on the record. Sia and I did a session with Pharrell and No Doubt. She's a genius and I love working with her. There's a song on the record called "Start a War" that she wrote that I'm very grateful for. I think the girls are gonna love that one." Popjustice's Brad O'Mance wrote that the announcement Stefani was working with Sia was good news. However, the physical release of "Baby Don't Lie" and "Start a War" never occurred. Furthermore, Universal Music Group's official website had listed a digital release of "Start a War" to take place on November 9, 2015, and had assigned it a UPC code, as it had for the unreleased maxi single for "Baby Don't Lie". In the week of its scheduled release, Stefani's single "Used to Love You" was distributed instead.

This marked Stefani's first time working with Birgisson, although she had worked with Furler previously on "My Heart Is Open" with Maroon 5 in 2014. The song was described as a ballad by several news publications, and its sound and melody were compared to Furler's solo works. Speaking of its genre, Billboard's Andrew Hampp labeled it a "power ballad".

== Critical reception ==
Spin's Colin Joyce was impressed by "Start a War". He stated that "the number seems to be the sort of skyward ballad that [Sia] has made her wheelhouse" and found it to be "a good look for Stefani". Stassa Edwards of Jezebel was equally positive, declaring that it "has all of the hallmarks of a Sia ballad – those mournful, moody bridges that Sia does so well". Edwards concluded by saying she enjoyed the feathery-inspired setup that accompanied Stefani's performance. Richard Baxter, a blogger on Popology Now, largely praised the track. He wrote: "As expected, 'Start a War' is very much in the veins of a typical Sia ballad. Same sound, same melodies, yet Gwen makes the song her own by not channeling Sia's vocals." Baxter continued: "It's got a bit of radio appeal, at least from what we can understand, and Gwen sounds pretty phenomenal." Also writing of Stefani's vocals, Julien Goncalves on the French website Purebreak Charts was pleased that the "aerial" song was strong enough to emphasize her voice.

== Live performance ==
Stefani has only performed "Start a War" once as part of a MasterCard Priceless Surprises Presents Gwen Stefani concert on February 7, 2015. The appearance took place at the Orpheum Theatre in Los Angeles, where it was advertised as a promotional event for her upcoming third album. The performance was accompanied by a feather backdrop and Stefani in matching clothing. Since she performed "Start a War" along with her recent releases ("Baby Don't Lie", "Spark the Fire", and "Together"), several news publications believed it would receive a commercial release. Having heard the performance, a blogger from KLUC-FM speculated that the track could belong to either Stefani or No Doubt.

== Track listings and formats ==
Unreleased "Baby Don't Lie" CD maxi single
No.	Title	Length
1.	"Baby Don't Lie" (album version)	3:23
2.	"Baby Don't Lie" (alternate version)	3:20
3.	"Start a War"	3:42
4.	"Carousel"	3:48

Unreleased digital download
No.	Title	Length
1.	"Start a War"	3:42

== Release history ==
Release dates and formats for "Start a War"
Region	Date (cancelled)	Format(s)	Label(s)	Ref.
United States	October 16, 2015	CD	Interscope; Mad Love	
United States	November 9, 2015	Digital download; streaming	Interscope; Mad Love	
