= The Dan Band =

American comedy band

- Origin: Los Angeles, California, U.S.
- Genres: Comedy; popular music
- Years active: 2000–present
- Members: Dan Finnerty; Gene Reed; John Kozeluh; Marc Strommer; Matt Pollock; David Arana; Byron Thames; Richard Maheux; Aurelien Budynek; Mark Cocheo; Einar Pedersen; Brett Bass; Ivan Delaforce; Jimi Engund; Jason Mills
- Website: www.thedanband.com

The Dan Band is a comedy band created by actor/comedian Dan Finnerty.

The band is known for its covers of originally female-performed pop songs, with added obscenities and swearing, made famous by Finnerty's appearance in the films Old School and The Hangover.

Finnerty has appeared in the hit movies Old School (singing "Total Eclipse of the Heart" and "Lady"), The Terminal, Starsky & Hutch, where he performed Roberta Flack's "Feel Like Makin' Love" at a bat mitzvah, and The Hangover (performing "Candy Shop" and "Fame") in a wedding scene reminiscent of his appearance in Old School.

In 2005, they released The Dan Band Live, their live full-length debut album. They gained attention due to their expletive-heavy version of Bonnie Tyler's "Total Eclipse of the Heart," as well as their cover versions of "Lady" by Styx, "Milkshake" by Kelis, Toni Basil's "Mickey," and many others.

They filmed a one-hour concert special of their live show called Dan Finnerty & The Dan Band: I Am Woman, for the Bravo network, which was directed by McG and executive produced by Steven Spielberg.

The band released a Christmas LP called Ho: A Dan Band Xmas. The album consists completely of original Dan Band songs, with no covers. Songs on the album include "Ho, Ho, Ho" (a smooth R&B Christmas song about a prostitute), "Merry Christmakwanzakah", "Please Don't Bomb Nobody This Holiday" and "I Wanna Rock U Hard This Christmas" with a video featuring Florence Henderson from The Brady Bunch making the moves on Santa at a retirement home. The video for "Please Don't Bomb Nobody This Holiday" featured many celebrity cameos, including Sheryl Crow, Christina Applegate, Nicole Scherzinger from The Pussycat Dolls, Kyle Gass from Tenacious D, Neil Patrick Harris, Meg Ryan, Macy Gray, Christopher Guest, among others.

In addition to their numerous appearances on The Tonight Show with Jay Leno, they have been seen as the house band on The Ellen DeGeneres Show, Pajama Party and Spike TV's Spike Guys' Choice Awards 2009 as well as appearances on Jimmy Kimmel Live!, The Late Late Show, and Last Call with Carson Daly. Finnerty wrote and performed the finale song for the NBC show Last Comic Standing and was a regular comedy correspondent on The Jay Leno Show and continued on as a correspondent on the new The Tonight Show with Jay Leno performing all original material for the show.

In 2015, the band released their third album, entitled The Wedding Album, a mixture of covers and originals, featuring collaborations with Nicole Scherzinger, Train, Nuno Bettencourt, Bridget Everett and Rob Thomas.

Finnerty recently co-wrote the song "Look At Her" with American Idol musical director Michael Orland and performed it in the Netflix movie Dumplin' starring Jennifer Aniston.

== Discography ==
- 2000: Two Guys and a Girl episode "Bridesmaid Revisited"
- 2001: The Wedding Planner soundtrack
- 2003: Old School soundtrack
- 2004: Starsky and Hutch soundtrack
- 2005: The Dan Band Live
- 2006: Ho: A Dan Band Christmas
- 2009: The Hangover soundtrack ("Candy Shop")
- 2015: The Wedding Album

== Members ==
- Dan Finnerty – lead vocals
- Gene Reed – backing vocals
- John Kozeluh – backing vocals
- Matt Pollock – backing vocals
- David Arana/Byron Thames/Richard Maheux – keyboard
- Marc Strommer/Aurelien Budynek/Mark Cocheo – guitar
- Einar Pedersen/Brett Bass – bass
- Ivan Delaforce/Jimi Engund/Jason Mills – drums
