= Together (Calvin Harris song) =

Song by Calvin Harris featuring Gwen Stefani

from the album Motion
- Released: 16 January 2015
- Studio: Fly Eye Studio (London); Kingston Sound (Los Angeles)
- Genre: EDM
- Length: 3:38
- Label: Fly Eye; Columbia
- Songwriter(s): Calvin Harris; Gwen Stefani; Benjamin Levin; Ryan Tedder
- Producer(s): Calvin Harris

"Together" is a song recorded by Scottish DJ and record producer Calvin Harris featuring American singer Gwen Stefani for the former's fourth studio album, Motion (2014). It was written by Harris, Stefani, Benjamin Levin, and Ryan Tedder. The track was solely produced by Harris.

== Background and recording ==
In 2013, Harris started recording new material after the release of his 2012 studio album, 18 Months. This is when he worked with a wide variety of collaborators, including: Alesso, Hurts, John Newman, Ellie Goulding, Ummet Ozcan, Big Sean, R3hab, Haim, Tinashe, Firebeatz, All About She, and Gwen Stefani.

== Critical reception ==
After the release of the song, it received very positive reviews from critics who considered it a standout from the album. Mikael Wood of the Los Angeles Times praised her performance on the track, saying "the presence of strong women does wonders for Harris' amped-up music. They bring out the man, not the meathead, in the machine."

== Live performances ==
Stefani performed the track live on certain occasions, during the 24th Annual Men's Handball World Championship in Qatar and her 2015–16 promotional concert tour MasterCard Priceless Surprises Presents Gwen Stefani.

== Charts ==
Chart (2014)	Peak position
US Hot Dance/Electronic Songs (Billboard)	25
US Dance/Electronic Digital Songs (Billboard)	19
