= Jay Carson =

American screenwriter and producer

- Born: c. 1977 (age 48–49); Macon, Georgia, U.S.
- Education: Columbia University
- Occupations: Writer; producer; political advisor

Jay Carson (born c. 1977) is an American screenwriter, producer, and former political advisor. Carson worked in domestic and international politics for Bill Clinton, Hillary Clinton, Howard Dean, Bill Bradley, Chuck Schumer, Mike Bloomberg, and Tom Daschle before his career in film and television. He was Hillary Clinton's press secretary in her 2008 presidential campaign. He is the former Chief Deputy Mayor of Los Angeles, serving under Mayor Antonio Villaraigosa.

Carson's film credits include co-writing The Front Runner (2018). On television, he was a supervising producer and consultant for House of Cards (2013–2017) and created The Morning Show (2019–present).

== Political career ==
Carson's career as a senior-level policy advisor and strategist began in 1998 working on Senator Charles Schumer's successful upset Senate campaign and Bill Bradley's presidential campaign in 2000. Carson then served as the Deputy Communications Director for Senate Democratic Leader Tom Daschle. Carson left the Leadership's Office to become the Press Secretary for Governor Howard Dean's 2004 presidential campaign—the first major campaign to utilize the Internet for mass fundraising and volunteer organizing.

In August 2005, Carson was named the Communications Director for the William J. Clinton Foundation—President Clinton's international non-profit organization based in New York City—where he was responsible for overseeing media relations and serving as a senior advisor to the former president.

After spending several years at the Clinton Foundation, Carson served as the press secretary for Hillary Clinton's 2008 presidential campaign. In addition to serving as the main spokesperson for the campaign, he was a senior advisor to Clinton providing day-to-day counsel.

In September 2009, Los Angeles Mayor Antonio Villaraigosa appointed Carson to the position of Chief Deputy Mayor as part of the Mayor's broader effort to refocus his office during his second and final term.

From 2010 to 2015, Carson worked as a Senior Advisor to Bloomberg Philanthropies, Michael Bloomberg's venue for charitable giving.

From 2010 to 2013, Carson was the Executive Director for C40 Cities Climate Leadership Group. In 2013, he stepped down from the C40 Cites Climate Leadership Group and became the Co-Principal in charge of marketing & communications for Bloomberg Associates.

Carson has been described as an "informal adviser" to the 2024 presidential campaign of Robert F. Kennedy Jr.; in May 2024, he produced a 30-minute "infomercial" for the campaign released online.

== Film and television career ==
Carson began his career in Hollywood as a supervising producer and political consultant for the Netflix original series, House of Cards. He worked on the show since its inception.

Carson co-wrote the 2018 film, The Front Runner, about Gary Hart's failed presidential bid. It starred Hugh Jackman.

Carson is the creator of the Apple TV+ series The Morning Show, serving as executive producer alongside Jennifer Aniston and Reese Witherspoon. Apple's near $300-million-plus commitment for the show is one of the largest ever. In April 2018, Carson was fired from The Morning Show over "creative differences." An arbitration process at the Writers Guild of America awarded Carson the lone "created by" credit.

In 2016, another screenplay written by Bai and Carson, Donzinger, which tells the story of a massive class action suit against Chevron in Ecuador, was recognized on the Hollywood Black List.

In 2019, it was reported that Carson was developing a drama about journalism with Matt Bai and Steve Kloves, for Entertainment 360.

== Personal ==
Carson received his B.A. from Columbia University in New York City, and has served as an adjunct professor at USC's Annenberg School and senior fellow at UCLA's School of Public Affairs. He is currently a member of the Foundation Board of Trustees for Children's Hospital Los Angeles.

He was the inspiration for Ryan Gosling's character in the 2011 motion picture, The Ides of March.

Carson was named as one of Fortune magazine's "40 Under 40: Ones to Watch" in 2011.

Carson was married to screenwriter and playwright Sarah Treem for three years and divorced in 2017.

== Awards ==
Year	Award	Category	Nominated work	Result
2017	PGA Awards	Outstanding Producer of Episodic Television, Drama	House of Cards	Nominated
2016	Primetime Emmy Awards	Outstanding Drama Series	House of Cards	Nominated
2015	Primetime Emmy Awards	Outstanding Drama Series	House of Cards	Nominated
