= Forty Winks (2022 film) =

- VOD film poster
- Directed by: William Atticus Parker
- Written by: William Atticus Parker
- Produced by: William Atticus Parker
- Starring: Justin Marcel McManus; Susan Sarandon; John Turturro
- Release date: 2022
- Running time: 80 minutes
- Country: United States
- Language: English

Forty Winks is a 2022 American crime comedy-drama film written and directed by William Atticus Parker and starring Justin Marcel McManus, Susan Sarandon, and John Turturro.

== Cast ==
- Justin Marcel McManus as Fabio Berker
- Susan Sarandon as Connie Montoya
- John Turturro as Milo
- Danny Burstein as Mr. Monroe
- Carmen Ejogo as Nina Sherman
- Hart Bochner as The Narrator
- Ben Shenkman as Daryl Camacho
- Leon Addison Brown as Wesley
- Dan Finnerty as Vernon Whitaker

== Production ==
The film was shot in New York.

== Reception ==
Alan Ng of Film Threat rated the film a 6 out of 10 and wrote, "At the same time, Sarandon and Turturro are fantastic acting against lead McManus. But money can’t buy the indie guerrilla filmmaking charms that ooze all over Parker’s film." A review at High On Fims was very negative and stated, "Forty Winks thus becomes a visually distinct but empty and inert exercise that doesn’t know what to do with Black and White frames or the characters that serve no purpose to either its overreaching themes or its mumbling progression." A review in the Midwest Film Journal praised the production, but criticised the narration. Common Sense Media described it as a "(q)uirky, mature dramedy (that) has non-stereotypical characters."

== Accolades ==
The film was selected for the 8 & Halfilm Awards.
