= List of The Mysteries of Laura episodes =

The Mysteries of Laura is an American police procedural comedy-drama television series developed by Jeff Rake and executive-produced Greg Berlanti and McG. The series premiered on September 17, 2014, on NBC. The Mysteries of Laura stars Debra Messing in the lead role of Detective Laura Diamond, a New York City homicide detective who balances her day job with off-duty hours as a single mother of two unruly sons. On May 8, 2015, The Mysteries of Laura was renewed for a second season of 13 episodes, which premiered on September 23, 2015. On November 9, 2015, NBC ordered three additional episodes for the second season. On May 14, 2016, NBC canceled the series after two seasons. During the course of the series, 38 episodes of The Mysteries of Laura aired over two seasons, concluding on March 2, 2016.

== Series overview ==
| Season | Episodes | Originally released | |
| Season | Episodes | First released | Last released |
|---|---|---|---|
| 1 | 22 | September 17, 2014 | May 20, 2015 |
| 2 | 16 | September 23, 2015 | March 2, 2016 |

== Episodes ==
=== Season 1 (2014–15) ===
| No. overall | No. in season | Title | Directed by | Written by | Original release date | Prod. code | US viewers (millions) |
|---|---|---|---|---|---|---|---|
| 1 | 1 | "Pilot" | McG | Teleplay by : Jeff Rake | September 17, 2014 | 276075 | 10.19 |
Laura Diamond, a hotshot detective in the NYPD who tries to balance her columbo-like day job, while navigating her crazy home life with her impending divorce and the difficulties of motherhood. But her life becomes even more complicated as she tries to solve the murder of a computer mogul.
| 2 | 2 | "The Mystery of the Dead Date" | McG | Jeff Rake | September 24, 2014 | 4X5852 | 10.01 |
When an online hookup ends in a murder, Laura goes undercover by creating her own dating profile to get into Manhattan's hottest night spots. Meanwhile, Jake finally inks the divorce papers.
| 3 | 3 | "The Mystery of the Biker Bar" | Millicent Shelton | Amanda Green & Blair Singer | October 1, 2014 | 4X5853 | 8.98 |
While investigating the death of an old friend, Jake and Laura begin to work together on their wild past.
| 4 | 4 | "The Mystery of the Sex Scandal" | Bronwen Hughes | Margaret Easley & Laura Putney | October 8, 2014 | 4X5855 | 8.77 |
A sex scandal rocks the campaign of an influential congressman, Laura is then tasked with finding out the truth. However, when a curve ball is thrown their way, the 2nd precinct must explore the online gaming world to stop the perp. Guest starring: Wallace Shawn as Kenneth Walters
| 5 | 5 | "The Mystery of the Terminal Tenant" | Vince Misiano | Jeff Rake & Amanda Green | October 15, 2014 | 4X5856 | 8.67 |
When the team finds the remains of a man's body that appears to have been killed in his own bathroom, but when the homeowner shows up alive and well, the detectives not only find themselves on the hunt for the killer Meanwhile, Laura and Jake decide to try 'nesting' as a solution to their struggles surrounding shared custody of the boys.
| 6 | 6 | "The Mystery of the Red Runway" | Michael Lange | Jeffrey Lippman & Rick Marin | October 22, 2014 | 4X5854 | 8.25 |
The intern of a high end designer is murdered and Laura explores the high fashion world to find the killer. Max's position at the precinct is also reevaluated.
| 7 | 7 | "The Mystery of the Art Ace" | Jace Alexander | Rick Marin & Jeffery Lippman | October 29, 2014 | 4X5857 | 7.49 |
Laura looks for clues as to who murdered the son of a gallery owner and the team must navigate the local karaoke scene to find who did it. Laura is also forced to reconnect with her estranged father so he can help prepare her for a high-stakes poker game.
| 8 | 8 | "The Mystery of the Mobile Murder" | Michael Schultz | Bill Chais & Diarra Kilpatrick | November 5, 2014 | 4X5858 | 7.87 |
The team delve into the beauty empire when a woman is found murdered on a party bus. Meanwhile, there is competition between the detectives in the lead-up to the annual mud race.
| 9 | 9 | "The Mystery of the Dysfunctional Dynasty" | Michael Fields | Bill Chais & Beth Armogida | November 19, 2014 | 4X5859 | 8.61 |
Religion becomes a factor when Laura and the detectives investigate the murder of a couple. Meanwhile Laura and Jake's search for a replacement nanny brings them face to face with someone familiar. Guest starring: Peter Jacobson as Russell
| 10 | 10 | "The Mystery of the Fertility Fatality" | Mike Listo | Margaret Easley & Laura Putney | December 10, 2014 | 4X5860 | 8.09 |
Everyone is off to the horse races in this episode, as Laura and the team investigate the disappearance of a fertility doctor. Meanwhile, a group of nosy mothers pry into Laura's mothering skills when the boys are accused of bullying a girl at their Tae Kwon Do class.
| 11 | 11 | "The Mystery of the Frozen Foodie" | Cherie Nowlan | Jeffrey Lippman & Beth Armogida | January 7, 2015 | 4X5861 | 6.81 |
A chef at a restaurant is murdered and dumped into a garbage chute. Meanwhile, Laura meets someone new. Guest starring: Bronson Pinchot as Head Chef J.T. Thompson, Rocco DiSpirito as himself
| 12 | 12 | "The Mystery of the Fateful Fire" | Randy Zisk | Amanda Green & Diarra Kilpatrick | January 14, 2015 | 4X5862 | 6.13 |
A building is engulfed in flames when the scene opens. After the crisis a body of a teenager is found. Jake's old flame returns.
| 13 | 13 | "The Mystery of the Deemed Dealer" | Bethany Rooney | Jeff Rake & Blair Singer | February 4, 2015 | 4X5863 | 6.37 |
The team investigates the murder of a star athlete, also, Laura and Jake reconnect.
| 14 | 14 | "The Mystery of the Popped Pugilist" | Norman Buckley | Bill Chais & Rick Marin | February 11, 2015 | 4X5864 | 5.82 |
Laura go to downtown to investigate a murder of a Drag Queen. Also, Laura has a wild night with an old friend.
| 15 | 15 | "The Mystery of the Alluring Au Pair" | Cherie Nowlan | Laura Putney & Margaret Easley | February 18, 2015 | 4X5865 | 5.86 |
A Detective comes to town and put Laura and the Precinct in a frenzy when Laura and Jake are investigated about their relationship.
| 16 | 16 | "The Mystery of the Exsanguinated Ex" | Randy Zisk | Amanda Green & Jason Ning | February 25, 2015 | 4X5866 | 7.63 |
Laura is forced to reunite with her ex-boyfriend Dr. Andrew Devlin as she investigates a murder in which he is involved. Guest starring: Eric McCormack as Dr. Andrew Devlin
| 17 | 17 | "The Mystery of the Intoxicated Intern" | Vince Misiano | Jeffrey Lippman & Diarra Kilpatrick | March 25, 2015 | 4X5867 | 6.42 |
The team investigates a murder of a sorority pledge who is also an intern at a high rise business. Laura struggles to find time to be with her new boyfriend. Guest starring: Joy Osmanski as Linda Singer
| 18 | 18 | "The Mystery of the Sunken Sailor" | Michael Schultz | Rick Marin & Beth Armogida | March 31, 2015 | 4X5868 | 6.19 |
Laura and Billy investigate the murder of a sailor on a military ship. Also, Laura tries to avoid her upcoming birthday.
| 19 | 19 | "The Mystery of the Dodgy Draft" | Vince Misiano | Story by : Bill Chais & Blair Singer; Teleplay by : Bill Chais | April 22, 2015 | 4X5869 | 6.41 |
Laura has to deal with a personal crisis as she investigates the murder of a teacher's aide. Guest starring: Emily Rutherfurd as Dawn Grant
| 20 | 20 | "The Mystery of the Crooked Clubber" | Tricia Brock | Amanda Green & Jacob Copithorne | May 6, 2015 | 4X5870 | 6.04 |
A club patron's death is linked to jewelry heists in the Diamond District so the detectives must halt a thievery ring in order to solve a murder. Meanwhile, Jake breaks divorced-parent protocols, leading Laura to reexamine her involvement with Tony. Guest starring: Frankie Muniz as himself, Janel Parrish as Jillian Havenmeyer
| 21 | 21 | "The Mystery of the Deceased Documentarian" | Mel Damski | Laura Putney & Margaret Easley | May 13, 2015 | 4X5871 | 6.17 |
When a young filmmaker is murdered, Laura has to revisit a cold case of a murdered high school senior who was killed nearly 15 years earlier on her prom night in order to find the killer. Guest starring: Steve Guttenberg as himself, Melissa Joan Hart as KC Moss
| 22 | 22 | "The Mystery of the Corner Store Crossfire" | Bethany Rooney | Jeff Rake | May 20, 2015 | 4X5872 | 7.05 |
A medical emergency puts Laura and the team on edge as one of their own clings to life while they hunt for search for the suspect-- who is armed with a new, high-tech weapon. Guest starring: Remy Auberjonois as Dr. Evanston

=== Season 2 (2015–16) ===
| No. overall | No. in season | Title | Directed by | Written by | Original release date | Prod. code | US viewers (millions) |
|---|---|---|---|---|---|---|---|
| 23 | 1 | "The Mystery of the Taken Boy" | Michael Smith | Jeff Rake & Amanda Green | September 23, 2015 | 4X6551 | 7.11 |
Nearly 6 months following his shooting, Jake returns to work, but finds his unit under a new regime by an obnoxious Captain Santiani (Callie Thorne), While the team races against time to find a young kidnapped diabetic boy who was collateral damage to his family's damaging secret. Guest starring: Cara Buono as Julia Davis
| 24 | 2 | "The Mystery of the Cure to Loneliness" | Michael Schultz | Marc Dube & Dean Lopata | September 30, 2015 | 4X6552 | 7.35 |
When a cancer women died of mysterious circumstances, Laura and her team begin to explore the world of cancer survivors, however, learn that looks can be deceiving.
| 25 | 3 | "The Mystery of the Locked Box" | Bethany Rooney | Laura Putney & Margaret Easley | October 7, 2015 | 4X6553 | 7.11 |
When a technology wunderkind is killed in an impenetrable fortress, Laura becomes stumped as she tries to solve this puzzling case. Guest starring: Gabriel Mann as Shane Allan
| 26 | 4 | "The Mystery of the Convict Mentor" | Cherie Nowlan | Jeff Rake & Niceole R. Levy | October 14, 2015 | 4X6554 | 6.92 |
Laura and her team join a intense manhunt after prison break, but loyalties and allegiances are called into question when they find out one of the escapees is their former captain. Guest starring: Enrico Colantoni as Dan Hauser
| 27 | 5 | "The Mystery of the Watery Grave" | Guy Norman Bee | Amanda Green & Nikhil S. Jayaram | October 21, 2015 | 4X6555 | 6.81 |
When a wife of a media mogul is driven off the road of the west side highway, Laura and her team must revisit a cold case that reveals a dark secret. Guest starring: Betty Gilpin as Isabella Van Doren, Jeffrey Pierce as David Van Doren
| 28 | 6 | "The Mystery of the Dead Heat" | Norman Buckley | Marc Dube & Kyle Warren | October 28, 2015 | 4X6556 | 6.35 |
An owner of a local gym is cooked alive in his own sauna, and Laura and her team dives into the world of fitness freaks. Guest starring: Sherri Saum as Cecelia Burke, Isaac Caldiero as Connor McKenna
| 29 | 7 | "The Mystery of the Maternal Instinct" | Michael Schultz | Dean Lopata & Niceole R. Levy | November 4, 2015 | 4X6557 | 7.00 |
The dead body of a pregnant African woman is found savagely dumped in a dangerous part the city, and Laura follows the trail of an international smuggling ring as they discover the goods being trafficked are not as they appear.
| 30 | 8 | "The Mystery of the Ghost in the Machine" | Norman Buckley | Jeff Rake & Nikhil S. Jayaram | November 18, 2015 | 4X6558 | 7.41 |
After an undercover cop working with a luxury car theft ring is murdered, Laura and the team discover his police photo was circulated. Knowing that the photo could only have been accessed through a highly secure computer that is not even on the internet, the team learns they are dealing with a brilliant young hacker.
| 31 | 9 | "The Mystery of the Triple Threat" | Bethany Rooney | Laura Putney & Margaret Easley | January 6, 2016 | 4X6559 | 6.84 |
When two men playing a high stakes/high tech scavenger hunt game find a man's dead body in a cathedral, Laura and the team must investigate both the game's players and the victim's personal life to discover the truth. Elsewhere, Laura's relationship with Tony comes to a crossroads, while she also learns that Jake has been lying to her about his medical condition.
| 32 | 10 | "The Mystery of the Downward Spiral" | Cherie Nowlan | Amanda Green & Kyle Warren | January 13, 2016 | 4X6560 | 7.53 |
The violent death of a perfume magnate leaves the team wondering who they can trust. Guest starring: Jerry O'Connell as John Dunham Special guest star: Stockard Channing as Brenda Phillips
| 33 | 11 | "The Mystery of the Unwelcome Houseguest" | Michael Smith | Marc Dube & Niceole R. Levy | January 20, 2016 | 4X6561 | 7.00 |
A new development puts Laura in moral danger, but also helps her quest in finding the killer. Guest starring: Jerry O'Connell as John Dunham Special guest star: Stockard Channing as Brenda Phillips
| 34 | 12 | "The Mystery of the Morning Jog" | Peter Werner | Dean Lopata & Nikhil S. Jayaram | February 3, 2016 | 4X6562 | 6.85 |
Laura investigates a men's rights organization entitled the Men's Renaissance Association after a jogger is pushed in front of a bus. The department sends some male officers to infiltrate the MRA meeting. Over the course of the investigation, Laura comes to realize she still loves Jake, and breaks the news to Tony. Guest starring: Greg Grunberg as Kurt Baronson, Harold Perrineau as Charles Baptiste
| 35 | 13 | "The Mystery of the Dark Heart" | David Warren | Amanda Green & Niceole R. Levy | February 10, 2016 | 4X6563 | 6.93 |
Captain Hauser is again temporarily released from prison to help the team when a young woman is murdered and another has gone missing, as the murder bears a resemblance to those committed by a serial killer he investigated many years ago. Meanwhile, Jake starts seeing prosecutor Jennifer Lambert, unaware that Laura has broken up with Tony. Guest starring: Enrico Colantoni as Dan Hauser Special guest star: Jenna Fischer as Jennifer Lambert
| 36 | 14 | "The Mystery of the Political Operation" | Jim Nickas | Laura Putney & Margaret Easley | February 17, 2016 | 4X6564 | 6.33 |
Carlos Hernandez, a Cuban working for the liberation of his country and normalizing relations with the USA, arrives in town to give a speech at the UN amid heavy protests and threats of an assassination. The threat appears real when Hernandez' trusted bodyguard is murdered. Laura and the team eventually uncover plans to kill Hernandez, but not for the reasons they originally thought. Elsewhere, Laura wants to tell Jake about breaking up with Tony, but backs off after realizing she really likes Jennifer. Guest starring: James Martinez as Carlos Hernandez Special guest star: Jenna Fischer as Jennifer Lambert
| 37 | 15 | "The Mystery of the Unknown Caller" | Norman Buckley | Jeff Rake & Dean Lopata | February 24, 2016 | 4X6565 | 6.52 |
Laura's past shows up in New York, further complicating her life, while solving a case that has a rare error, leading to an unexpected and powerful unfolding of events. Guest starring: Tate Donovan as Detective Malcolm Harris, Debby Ryan as Lucy Diamond, Louis Ozawa Changchien as Jimmy Chun
| 38 | 16 | "The Mystery of the End of Watch" | Michael Smith | Jeff Rake & Kyle Warren | March 2, 2016 | 4X6566 | 7.43 |
After suffering a devastating loss, Laura and the entire department set out to find out who killed Santani, but they must plunge into the dangerous world of the drug trade in order to apprehend a vicious international drug kingpin. Guest starring: Debby Ryan as Lucy Diamond, Louis Ozawa Changchien as Jimmy Chun, Scott Cohen as Vince DeLuca, Mercedes Ruehl as Val Santiani, Lewis Grosso as Justin Santiani-Deluca Special guest star: Jenna Fischer as Jennifer Lambert
