= The Mysteries of Laura =

American crime television series (2014–2016)

- Genre: Police procedural Comedy drama
- Based on: Los misterios de Laura by Carlos Vila & Javier Holgado
- Developed by: Jeff Rake
- Starring: Debra Messing; Laz Alonso; Josh Lucas; Janina Gavankar; Max Jenkins; Meg Steedle
- Composer: Joey Newman
- Country of origin: United States
- Original language: English
- No. of seasons: 2
- No. of episodes: 38 (list of episodes)

Production
- Executive producers: Jeff Rake; McG; Greg Berlanti; Aaron Kaplan; Sarah Schechter; Todd Lituchy
- Camera setup: Single-camera
- Running time: 42 minutes
- Production companies: Berlanti Productions; Kapital Entertainment; New Media Vision; Jeff Rake Productions; Warner Bros. Television

Original release
- Network: NBC
- Release: September 17, 2014 – March 2, 2016

The Mysteries of Laura is an American police procedural comedy-drama television series that aired on NBC from September 17, 2014, to March 2, 2016. It was developed by Jeff Rake, who also serves as an executive producer. The series, which stars Debra Messing as Detective Laura Diamond, was originally adapted from a Spanish television series Los misterios de Laura by Carlos Vila, Javier Holgado, and Gregorio Quintana de Uña. On May 8, 2015, NBC renewed The Mysteries of Laura for a second season of 13 episodes, which premiered on September 23, 2015. On November 9, 2015, NBC ordered three additional episodes for the second season. On May 14, 2016, NBC canceled the series after two seasons.

== Plot ==
The series follows the life of Laura Diamond, a homicide detective with the NYPD's 2nd Precinct, who balances her day job with her off-duty hours as a single mother to twin sons. Meanwhile, she is trying to get Captain Jake Broderick, her soon-to-be-former-husband, who is also her boss, to sign the divorce papers. After he finally signs them, Laura re-enters the dating world, and after a rough start, finds herself attracted to Tony Abbott, a chef and food truck owner who she encounters on a case. He makes excuses to see her. At the end of the first season, Capt. Broderick is shot and grievously wounded during a convenience store robbery. While in the hospital, he admits to Laura that despite everything he is still deeply in love with her, but due to severe head trauma, forgets he did this, leaving only Laura knowing.

Jake recovers, but at the beginning of the second season, the precinct has a new captain, Nancy Santiani, a stern, by-the-book taskmaster who immediately rubs the detectives the wrong way. Rather than transfer to another precinct, Broderick voluntarily takes a demotion to Senior Detective and partners with Laura, while Detective Billy Soto teams up with Detective Meredith Bose, with whom he has begun a relationship. Bose's previous partner, Frankie Pulaski, appears only in season one with the only explanation given for her departure being that she was not "senior enough" to stay in the position she accepted. The tone of the series was also altered in season two. Comedic elements, such as the rowdy behavior of Laura's boys, were reduced, while some focus was shifted to the triangle that develops between Laura, Jake, and Laura's new love interest Tony.

== Cast ==
=== Main ===
- Debra Messing as Detective Laura Diamond, the show's title character and chief protagonist.
- Josh Lucas as Captain Jake Broderick, Laura's former husband who was promoted to captain of her precinct at the start of the series. After being wounded in action, Jake takes a demotion to Senior Detective and becomes Laura's partner.
- Laz Alonso as Detective Billy Soto, Laura's initial partner, and later Detective Bose's partner/lover.
- Janina Gavankar as Detective Meredith Bose, a detective colleague of Laura and Billy's.
- Max Jenkins as Max Spencer Carnegie, the 2nd Precinct's independently wealthy intern.
- Meg Steedle as Detective Francesca "Frankie" Pulaski, who is from Eau Claire, Wisconsin and becomes Detective Bose's partner for a while (season 1, episodes 15–22).

=== Recurring ===
- Robert Klein as Leo Diamond, Laura and Lucy's father and the grandfather of Nicholas and Harrison.
- Charles and Vincent Reina as Nicholas and Harrison Broderick respectively, two rambunctious twin boys who are the sons of Laura and Jake, the grandsons of Leo, and the nephews of Lucy.
- Alysia Joy Powell as Alicia, the nanny/housekeeper for Laura's and Jake's sons.
- Neal Bledsoe as Tony Abbott, a food truck owner and Laura's first serious boyfriend after divorcing Jake.
- Callie Thorne as Captain Nancy Santiani (season 2), a by-the-book female cop, later captain at the precinct.
- Enrico Colantoni as Dan Hauser, the police captain before Jake.
- Stockard Channing as Brenda Phillips (season 2), the "shark in heels" in-house counsel of a perfume company.
- Jenna Fischer as Jennifer Lambert (season 2), a prosecutor and love interest for Jake.
- Debby Ryan as Lucy Diamond (season 2), Laura's trouble-making younger paternal half-sister and the half-aunt of Nicholas and Harrison.

== Episodes ==
| Season | Episodes | Originally released | |
| Season | Episodes | First released | Last released |
|---|---|---|---|
| 1 | 22 | September 17, 2014 | May 20, 2015 |
| 2 | 16 | September 23, 2015 | March 2, 2016 |

== Production ==
The series was originally adapted from a Spanish television series, Los misterios de Laura, by Carlos Vila and Javier Holgado. The American version was developed by Jeff Rake with Vila and Holgado. Rake also serves as an executive producer with Aaron Kaplan, Greg Berlanti for Berlanti Productions, Todd Lituchy and McG for Warner Bros. Television. The show was primarily filmed in New York City. Brooklyn's 78th Precinct was used for exterior shots of the 2nd Precinct.

It debuted on NBC during the 2014–15 television season, where it aired on Wednesday nights at 8 pm (ET/PT)/7 pm (CT). The series premiered on September 24, 2014. A preview aired beforehand on September 17, 2014, following the season finale of America's Got Talent.

== Reception ==
=== Ratings ===
The September 17, 2014, premiere drew a 2.0 rating in the 18–49 demographic and 10.2 million total viewers, in a special time slot leading out of the America's Got Talent season finale. It was the most-watched broadcast premiere of a series since March 2014. The regular-slot debut at 8 pm Eastern time on September 24, 2014, drew a 1.5 rating in the 18–49 demo and 9.9 million viewers overall.

Although it dropped 25% in the 18–49 demo, it retained 97% of its total viewers of the previous week's preview. In total viewers, this was NBC's best result with in-season regularly scheduled programming versus all regularly scheduled competition in that time period in more than five years.

| Season | Timeslot (ET) | Episodes | Premiered | | Ended | | TV Season | Rank | Viewers (in millions) |
| Season | Timeslot (ET) | Episodes | Date | Premiere Viewers (in millions) | Date | Finale Viewers (in millions) | TV Season | Rank | Viewers (in millions) |
|---|---|---|---|---|---|---|---|---|---|
| 1 | Wednesday 8:00 pm | 22 | September 17, 2014 | 10.19 | May 20, 2015 | 7.05 | 2014–15 | #62 | 8.02 |
| 2 | Wednesday 8:00 pm | 16 | September 23, 2015 | 7.11 | March 2, 2016 | 7.43 | 2015–16 | #48 | 8.57 |

=== Critical reception ===
The Mysteries of Laura received generally negative reviews from critics. The review aggregator website Rotten Tomatoes reported a 22% approval rating with an average rating of 4.2/10 based on 41 reviews for the first season. The website's consensus reads, "Despite a talented cast, The Mysteries of Laura is dated both as a cop show and as a representation of single, working mothers."

On Metacritic, the show has a score of 37 out of 100, based on 28 critics, indicating "generally unfavorable reviews".

Emilie Aries, however, called Messing's new character "the best depiction of women on the small screen".

=== Accolades ===
| Year | Award | Category | Recipient | Result |
|---|---|---|---|---|
| 2015 | Imagen Awards | Best Primetime Television Program — Comedy | The Mysteries of Laura | Nominated |
| 2015 | People's Choice Awards | Favorite Actress In A New TV Series | Debra Messing | Nominated |
| 2015 | People's Choice Awards | Favorite New TV Drama | The Mysteries of Laura | Nominated |
| 2015 | Young Artists Awards | Best Performance in a TV Series – Guest Starring Young Actress 10 and Under | Morgan McGarry | Nominated |

== Broadcast ==
In Canada, the show was simulcast with the American airing on CTV and is also rerun on M3. In New Zealand, it premiered on January 12, 2015, on TV2.

In the United Kingdom and Ireland, The Mysteries of Laura was picked up by 5USA on December 22, 2014, and premiered on January 20, 2015. In Germany, the show is known as Detective Laura Diamond, broadcast on Sat.1 since February 2, 2015. In Latin America, the show airs on Warner Channel, premiering on May 25, 2015.

In Australia, the series premiered on July 29, 2015, on the Nine Network. The first season has also been acquired in France by TF1. In India, the series is acquired by Zee Café, which premiered the show on July 24, 2015, at 11:00 pm IST with the Season 1 finale airing on August 26, 2015.
