= The Dan Band Live =

Live album by The Dan Band
- Released: 2005
- Recorded: 2005
- Genre: Rock
- Length: 46:04
- Label: SideOneDummy Records

Professional ratings
Review scores
| Source | Rating |
|---|---|
| Allmusic | link |

The Dan Band Live is the first album released by The Dan Band. It includes humorous covers of various pop songs.

== Track listing ==
1. "Free Your Mind/I Am Woman"
2. "Gloria/Mickey"
3. "ABBA Medley"
4. "Shoop/Whatta Man/Never Gonna Get It"
5. "Genie in a Bottle/No Scrubs/Slave 4 U"
6. "Tyrone/No More Drama"
7. "Hold On/Luka"
8. "Milkshake"
9. "Total Eclipse of the Heart"
10. "Flashdance/Fame"
11. "Whenever Wherever/Hips Don't Lie"
12. "You Oughta Know"
13. "Que Sera, Sera"
14. "I Wanna Rock You Hard This Christmas" (Bonus Track)
15. "Total Eclipse of the Heart" (Bonus Track - Studio Version)
