= Matt Bai =

American journalist (born 1968)

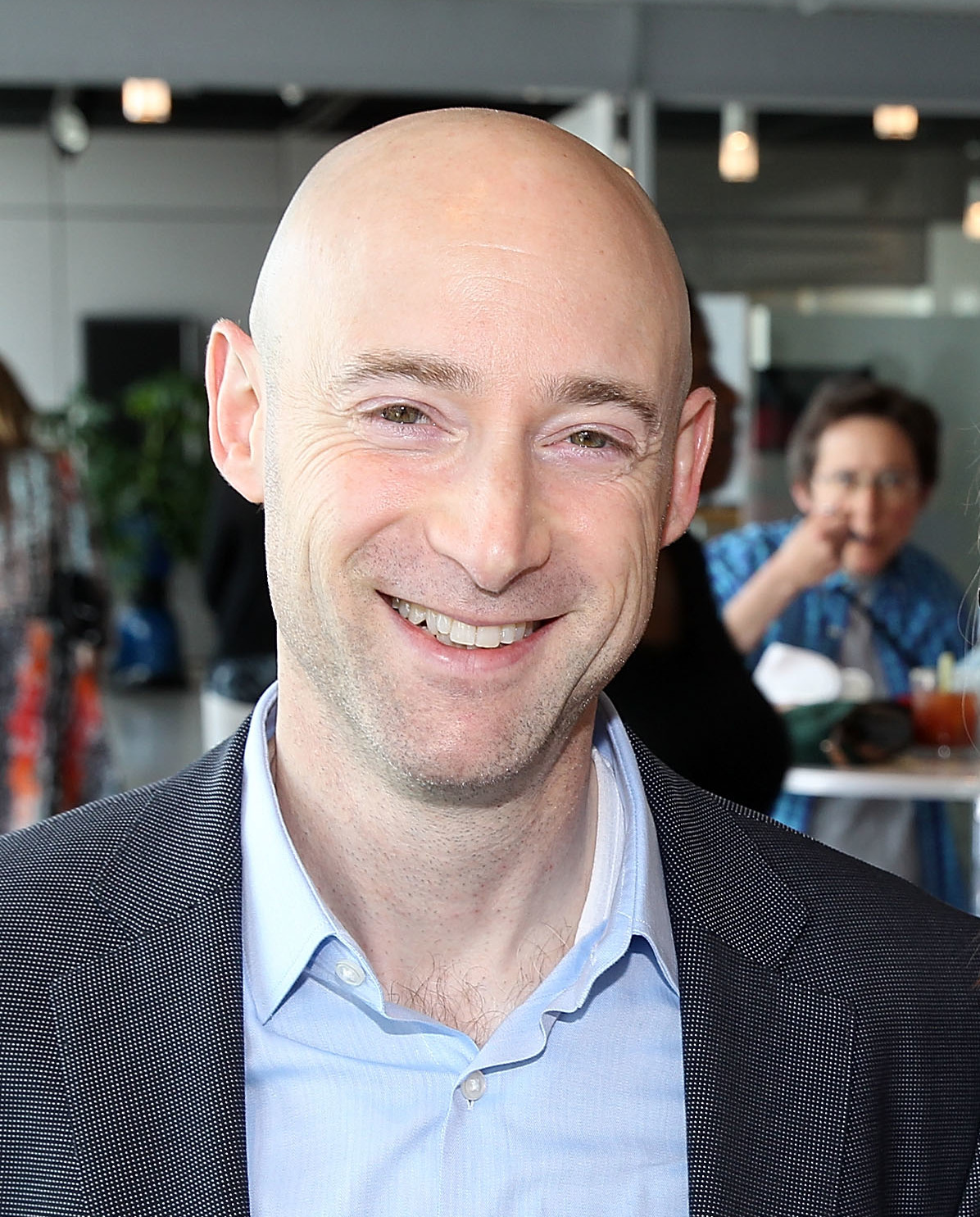
- Bai in May 2014
- Born: September 9, 1968 (age 58); Trumbull, Connecticut, U.S.
- Education: Tufts University (BA); Columbia University (MA)
- Occupations: Columnist, screenwriter
- Board member of: Jonathan M. Tisch College of Citizenship and Public Service at Tufts
- Spouse: Ellen Uchimiya
- Children: 2
- Awards: Pulitzer Traveling Fellowship
- Website: www.mattbai.com

Matt Bai (/ˈbaɪ/; born September 9, 1968) is an American journalist, author and screenwriter. He is the national affairs columnist for Rolling Stone, where he writes twice monthly essays and interviews leading political figures. Before joining Rolling Stone in January 2026, he spent six years as a contributing columnist for the Washington Post. Between 2014 and 2019, he was the national political columnist for Yahoo! News. On 25 July 2019, via Twitter, Bai announced he was leaving Yahoo! News to "focus on screenwriting". For more than a decade prior to that, he was the chief political correspondent for the New York Times Magazine, where he covered three presidential campaigns, as well as a columnist for the Times. His cover stories in the magazine include the 2008 cover essay "Is Obama the End of Black Politics?" and a 2004 profile of John Kerry titled "Kerry's Undeclared War". His work was honored in two editions of The Best American Political Writing. Bai is a graduate of the College of Arts and Sciences at Tufts University in Medford, MA, and Columbia's Graduate School of Journalism, where the faculty awarded him the Pulitzer Traveling Fellowship. In 2014, Bai had two brief appearances as himself in the second season of TV show House of Cards.

== Journalism career ==
He began his career as a speechwriter for the U.S. Committee for UNICEF, writing for Audrey Hepburn, among others, and his international coverage includes reporting from Liberia and Iraq.

Before joining the staff of New York Times Magazine, Bai was city desk reporter for the Boston Globe and a national correspondent for Newsweek magazine. In 2001, Bai was a fellow at Harvard Institute of Politics at Harvard Kennedy School at Harvard University, where he led a seminar on the next generation of political journalism. He has also been a fellow at the Hoover Institution at Stanford University and the University of Chicago Institute of Politics.

Other work by Bai for the New York Times Magazine has included cover stories on John McCain's philosophy about war and Barack Obama's strategy to win over white men, as well as a much-discussed cover essay, "Is Obama the End of Black Politics?". During the 2008 primaries, Bai wrote an online blog, The Primary Argument, on The New York Times website. He also wrote a personal essay about his Japanese American in-laws for the anthology, I Married My Mother-in-Law: And Other Tales of In-Laws We Can't Live With—and Can't Live Without, published in 2006 by Riverhead Books.

In a 2007 interview with the Progressive Book Club, Bai said his political work is more influenced by novelists writing about urban decline in America than by other political writers. "I think novelists have done a better job on the whole of describing the confusing moment we're in, in this post-industrial era", he said. "Writers like Philip Roth, Richard Russo (especially Empire Falls and Nobody's Fool and The Risk Pool), Richard Ford (especially The Sportswriter)—they've really tapped into a deep confusion."

== Books ==
Bai's first book, The Argument, published in August 2007, is an account of the "new progressive movement" in America and the people who built it. The Argument was the only political book to be named a New York Times Notable Book for 2007.

His second book, All the Truth Is Out: The Week Politics Went Tabloid, was published by Alfred A. Knopf in 2014. It revisits the 1987 media scandalization of then-candidate Gary Hart. Part history, part memoir and part cultural critique, the book was seen as a sharp critique of his own industry. Bai discussed this aspect of the book on The Daily Show with Jon Stewart and on NPR's Fresh Air, among other venues. Reviewing All the Truth Is Out in The New York Times, Jack Shafer called it "a mini classic of political journalism". The New Yorker's media critic, Ken Auletta, wrote, "Bai's superb book provokes many questions, and I gulped it down in a single sitting".

== Movies and television ==
Bai co-wrote the screenplay for The Front Runner, the cinematic version of All the Truth Is Out, along with the screenwriter Jay Carson and the film's director Jason Reitman. Starring Hugh Jackman, Vera Farmiga and J. K. Simmons, The Front Runner completed filming in Georgia in November 2017 and was released in November 2018. Another screenplay written by Bai and Carson, which tells the story of a massive class action suit against Chevron in Ecuador, was listed in the Hollywood Black List survey in 2016. Bai has also written for television, and in 2014, he played himself in two episodes of the Netflix series House of Cards, as part of a season-long storyline involving a magazine story he was writing in the show.
