= Billy Crudup =

American actor (born 1968)

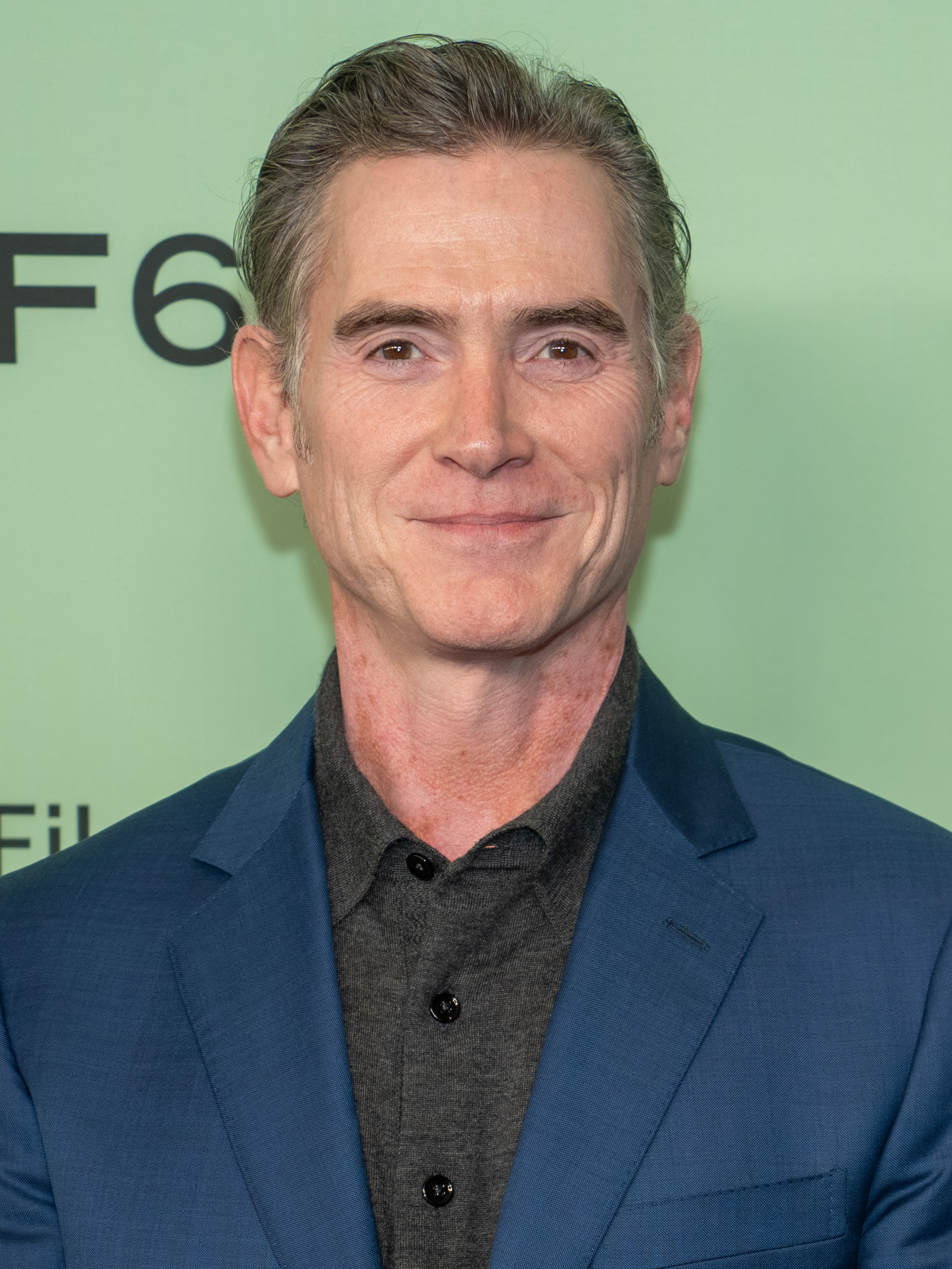
- Crudup at the NYFF in 2025
- Born: William Gaither Crudup; July 8, 1968 (age 58); Manhasset, New York, U.S.
- Education: University of North Carolina, Chapel Hill (BA); New York University (MFA)
- Occupation: Actor
- Years active: 1989–present
- Spouse: Naomi Watts (m. 2023)
- Partner(s): Mary-Louise Parker (1996–2003); Claire Danes (2003–2006)
- Children: William Atticus Parker

William Gaither Crudup (/ˈkruːdəp/; born July 8, 1968) is an American actor. Known for his roles on stage and screen, Crudup has received two Critics Choice Awards, two Emmy Awards, and a Tony Award as well as nominations for two Golden Globe Awards and an Olivier Award.

Crudup made his film debut in the legal crime drama Sleepers (1996). He was nominated for an Independent Spirit Award for Jesus' Son (1999). He has taken roles in Everyone Says I Love You (1996), Inventing the Abbotts (1997), Almost Famous (2000), Big Fish (2003), Public Enemies (2009), The Stanford Prison Experiment (2015), Spotlight (2015), Jackie (2016), 20th Century Women (2016) and Jay Kelly (2025). He has also acted in the blockbuster films Mission: Impossible III (2006), Watchmen (2009), Alien: Covenant (2017) and Justice League (2017).

On television, he has portrayed a network executive in the Apple TV+ drama series The Morning Show (2019–present) for which he won Primetime Emmy Awards for Outstanding Supporting Actor in a Drama Series. He has played Timothy Geithner in the HBO film Too Big to Fail (2011), and acted in the Netflix thriller series Gypsy (2017), and the Apple TV+ science fiction dramedy series Hello Tomorrow! (2023).

On stage, Crudup acted in the Tom Stoppard play The Coast of Utopia (2007) on Broadway for which he won the Tony Award for Best Featured Actor in a Play. He was Tony-nominated for his roles in The Elephant Man (2002), The Pillowman (2009), and Arcadia (2011). He starred in the West End production of the play Harry Clarke (2024) for which he was nominated for the Laurence Olivier Award for Best Actor.

In June 2023, Crudup married English actress Naomi Watts.

== Early life and education ==
Crudup was born in Manhasset, New York. His parents, Georgann (née Gaither) and Thomas Henry Crudup III divorced during his childhood, and later remarried, before divorcing a second time. Crudup has spoken of his father, who died in 2005, as an "incessant gambler and hustler salesman" who continuously sought "to hit the jackpot" throughout his life.

On his father's side, he is a descendant of Congressman Josiah Crudup of North Carolina. His maternal grandfather was William Cotter "Billy" Gaither, Jr., a well-known Florida trial lawyer, and his maternal grandmother later remarried to Episcopal bishop James Duncan.

The middle-born of three brothers, Crudup's brothers, Tommy and Brooks, are both producers. He left New York with his family when he was about eight years old, first living in Texas, then in Florida. He graduated from Saint Thomas Aquinas High School in Fort Lauderdale, Florida in 1986.

Crudup attended the University of North Carolina at Chapel Hill, where he received an undergraduate degree, and he continued his passion for acting with the undergraduate acting company, LAB! Theatre. He also acted for UNC-STV's most popular show, General College. He was a member of the Beta chapter of Delta Kappa Epsilon. He then studied at New York University's Tisch School of the Arts graduate acting program, where he earned a Master of Fine Arts degree in 1994.

== Career ==
=== 1994–2005: Rise to prominence ===
A year after graduating from Tisch, Crudup made his debut on Broadway in the Lincoln Center Theater production of Tom Stoppard's Arcadia (1994). Crudup began acting in films such as 1996's Sleepers, 1997's Inventing the Abbotts, and 1998's Without Limits, where he played the role of running legend and Olympian Steve Prefontaine. His first role in an animated feature was in 1999's English release of Princess Mononoke, in which he voiced Ashitaka.

From 1998 to 2005, Crudup was the narrator for the U.S. television ad campaign Priceless for Mastercard. In the ads, the narrator (Crudup) lists the prices of two goods or services, then lists some third, intangible benefit gained from those purchases and concludes, "priceless". He said in 2005 that appearing in the ads "changed my life", in that they gave him the financial freedom to pursue the acting work that he wanted to do. He then played lead guitarist Russell Hammond from Stillwater, the fictional band at the center of Cameron Crowe's Almost Famous (2000). Crudup received a 2002 Tony Award nomination for Best Actor in a Play for his performance as the title character in The Elephant Man on Broadway, as well as a 2005 nomination for his role as Katurian in the Broadway production of The Pillowman, also starring Jeff Goldblum, which closed on September 18, 2005.

=== 2006–2018: The Coast of Utopia and other roles ===
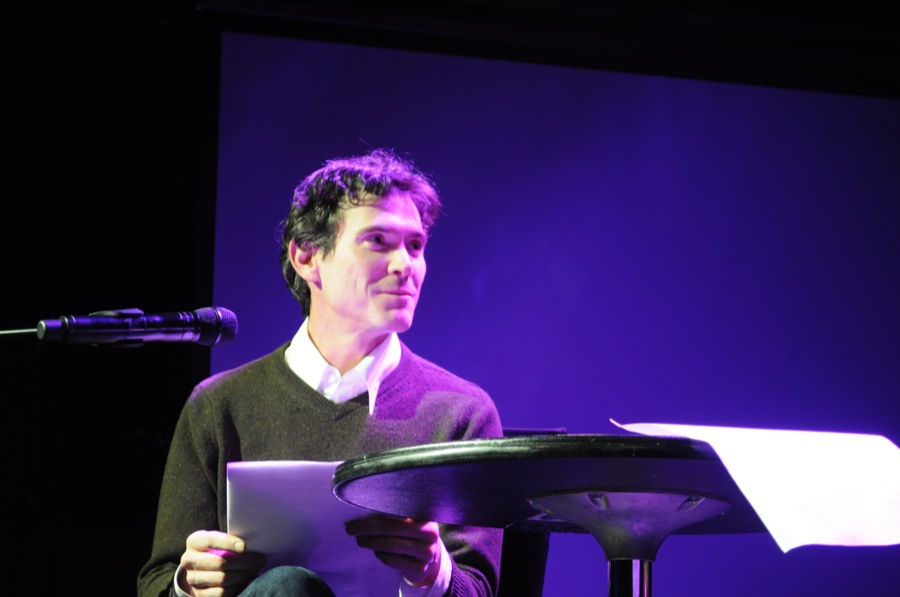
Crudup in New York City, January 2011

In 2006's The Good Shepherd, he played British spy Arch Cummings, a stand-in for Kim Philby. The same year, he played a supporting role in Mission: Impossible III. From October 2006 through May 2007, he was featured in the first two parts of The Coast of Utopia by Tom Stoppard at Lincoln Center, playing literary critic Vissarion Belinsky, for which he received a 2007 Tony Award for Best Featured Actor in a Play. In 2007, he played the leading role of Henry Roth in the film Dedication. He appeared as Zartan in the 2009 parody video The Ballad of G.I. Joe on the website Funny or Die. Crudup completed filming Watchmen with director Zack Snyder in Vancouver, British Columbia. He portrayed the superhero Doctor Manhattan. He portrayed former U.S. Secretary of the Treasury Timothy Geithner in a TV film about 2008's financial crisis, Too Big to Fail (2011). He starred in The Metal Children, an off-Broadway play written and directed by Adam Rapp in 2010.

In 2011, Crudup received a Tony Award nomination for Featured Actor in a Play for his role in the Broadway revival of Arcadia. In August 2013, he co-starred with Ian McKellen and Patrick Stewart in the Harold Pinter play No Man's Land as well as in Waiting for Godot at the Berkeley Repertory Theatre. The shows transferred to The Cort Theatre in New York City, where they ran in repertory until March 2014.

In November 2017, he starred in the world premiere of David Cale's one-man play Harry Clarke at Vineyard Theatre. It moved to the Minetta Lane Theatre the following spring.

=== 2019–present: The Morning Show and acclaim ===
Crudup acted in the Apple TV+ drama series The Morning Show portraying a cunning and charismatic network executive for which he won a Primetime Emmy Award in 2020 and 2024 and a Critics' Choice Television Award in 2020 and 2023. He returned to the West End acting in High Noon at the Harold Pinter Theatre from 2025 to 2026. He also acted in Harry Clarke at the Ambassadors Theatre for which he was nominated for the Laurence Olivier Award for Best Actor.

He took a supporting role in the Noah Baumbach directed Netflix dramedy Jay Kelly (2025) for which he earned positive reviews. Also that year he returned to the New York stage acting in an off-Broadway production of the Henrik Ibsen play Ghosts at Lincoln Center's Mitzi E. Newhouse Theatre. Crudup acted alongside Lily Rabe, Hamish Linklater, and Ella Beatty. He is set to return to the West End in a production of the Edward Albee play Who's Afraid of Virginia Woolf? opposite Gillian Anderson at the @sohoplace in 2026.

== Personal life ==
From 1996 to November 2003, Crudup was in a relationship with actress Mary-Louise Parker. She was seven months pregnant with their son, William Atticus Parker, born in January 2004, when Crudup ended their relationship and began dating actress Claire Danes. Crudup and Danes separated in 2006.

In 2017, Crudup began dating actress Naomi Watts, after the two met on the set of the Netflix drama series Gypsy. The couple married in New York City in June 2023. In June 2024, Watts and Crudup celebrated their nuptials in a second ceremony surrounded by their family in Mexico.

== Acting credits ==
=== Film ===
Year	Title	Role	Notes
1996	Sleepers	Thomas "Tommy" Marcano	
1996	Everyone Says I Love You	Ken Risley	
1997	Inventing the Abbotts	Jacey Holt	
1997	Grind	Eddie	
1998	Monument Ave.	Teddy Timmons	
1998	Without Limits	Steve Prefontaine	
1998	The Hi-Lo Country	Pete Calder	
1999	Princess Mononoke	Ashitaka (voice)	English dub
1999	Jesus' Son	F.H.	
2000	Waking the Dead	Fielding Pierce	
2000	Almost Famous	Russell Hammond	
2001	World Traveler	Cal	
2001	Charlotte Gray	Julien Levade	
2003	Big Fish	Will Bloom	
2003	Stage Beauty	Ned Kynaston	
2005	Trust the Man	Tobey	
2006	Mission: Impossible III	John Musgrave	
2006	The Good Shepherd	Arch Cummings	
2007	Dedication	Henry Roth	
2008	Pretty Bird	Curtis Prentiss	
2009	Watchmen	Jon Osterman / Dr. Manhattan	
2009	Public Enemies	J. Edgar Hoover	
2009	The Ballad of G.I. Joe	Zartan	Short
2010	Eat Pray Love	Stephen	
2011	Thin Ice	Randy Kinney	
2012	The Watch	Paul	
2013	Blood Ties	Detective Frank Pierzynski	
2014	Rudderless	Sam	
2014	The Longest Week	Dylan Tate	
2014	Glass Chin	J.J. Cook	
2015	The Stanford Prison Experiment	Dr. Philip Zimbardo	
2015	Spotlight	Eric MacLeish	
2016	Youth in Oregon	Brian Gleason	
2016	Jackie	The Journalist	
2016	20th Century Women	William	
2017	Alien: Covenant - Prologue: Last Supper	Christopher "Chris" Oram	Short
2017	1 Mile to You	Coach K	
2017	Alien: Covenant	Christopher "Chris" Oram	
2017	Justice League	Henry Allen	
2019	After the Wedding	Oscar Carlson	
2019	Where'd You Go, Bernadette	Elgie Branch	
2021	Zack Snyder's Justice League	Henry Allen	Uncredited
2021	Die in a Gunfight	Narrator	
2021	Donnybrook	Victor Roberts	Short
2025	Jay Kelly	Timothy Galligan	

=== Television ===
Year	Title	Role	Notes	Ref.
2011	Too Big to Fail	Timothy Geithner	HBO television film	
2017	Gypsy	Michael Holloway	Main role, 10 episodes	
2019	At Home with Amy Sedaris	Dr. Raddish	Episode: "Halloween"	
2019–present	The Morning Show	Cory Ellison	Main role; 5 seasons	
2022	The Last Movie Stars	James Goldstone (voice)	Docuseries	
2023	Hello Tomorrow!	Jack Billings	Main role	

=== Theater ===
Year	Play	Role	Venue	Notes	Ref.
1994	America Dreaming	Robert	Vineyard Theatre	Off-Broadway	
1995	Arcadia	Septimus Hodge	Lincoln Center Theatre	Broadway	
1996	Bus Stop	Bo Decker	Circle in the Square Theatre	Broadway	
1997	The Three Sisters	Staff Captain Solyony	Roundabout Theatre	Broadway	
1998	Oedipus	Oedipus	Blue Light Theatre Company	Off-Broadway	
2001	Measure for Measure	Angelo	Public Theatre	Shakespeare in the Park	
2002	The Resistible Rise of Arturo Ui	Flake / Defense Counsel	National Actors Theatre	Off-Broadway	
2002	The Elephant Man	John Merrick	Royale Theatre	Broadway	
2004	The 24 Hour Plays	Bobby	American Airlines Theatre	Staged reading	
2005	The Pillowman	Katurian	Edwin Booth Theatre	Broadway	
2006–2007	The Coast of Utopia: Part 1 – Voyage	Vissarion Belinsky	Lincoln Center Theatre	Broadway	
2006–2007	The Coast of Utopia: Part 2 – Shipwreck	Vissarion Belinsky	Lincoln Center Theatre	Broadway	
2009	The 24 Hour Plays	Billy	American Airlines Theatre	Staged reading	
2010	The Metal Children	Tobin Falmouth	Vineyard Theatre	Off-Broadway	
2011	Arcadia	Bernard Nightingale	Ethel Barrymore Theatre	Broadway	
2013	No Man's Land	Foster	Berkeley Repertory Theatre	California	
2013	No Man's Land	Foster	Cort Theatre	Broadway	
2013	Waiting for Godot	Lucky	Berkeley Repertory Theatre	California	
2013	Waiting for Godot	Lucky	Cort Theatre	Broadway	
2017	Harry Clarke	Various	Vineyard Theatre	Off-Broadway	
2018	Harry Clarke	Various	Minetta Lane Theatre	Off-Broadway	
2024	Harry Clarke	Various	Ambassadors Theatre	West End	
2025	Ghosts	Pastor Manders	Lincoln Center Theatre	Off-Broadway	
2025–2026	High Noon	Will Kane	Harold Pinter Theatre	West End	
2026	Who's Afraid of Virginia Woolf?	George	@sohoplace	West End	

== Awards and nominations ==
Organizations	Year	Category	Work	Result	Ref.
Actor Awards	2000	Outstanding Cast in a Motion Picture	Almost Famous	Nominated	
Actor Awards	2015	Outstanding Cast in a Motion Picture	Spotlight	Won	
Actor Awards	2020	Outstanding Actor in a Drama Series	The Morning Show (season one)	Nominated	
Actor Awards	2022	Outstanding Actor in a Drama Series	The Morning Show (season two)	Nominated	
Actor Awards	2024	Outstanding Actor in a Drama Series	The Morning Show (season three)	Nominated	
Actor Awards	2024	Outstanding Ensemble in a Drama Series	The Morning Show (season three)	Nominated	
Berlin International Film Festival	2007	Outstanding Artist Contribution	The Good Shepherd	Won	
Blockbuster Entertainment Awards	2001	Favorite Actor – Drama / Romance	Almost Famous	Nominated	
Capri Hollywood International Film Festival	2025	Best Ensemble Cast (Note: Shared with George Clooney, Laura Dern, Adam Sandler, Alba Rohrwacher and Giovanni Esposito)	Jay Kelly	Won	
Clarence Derwent Awards	1995	Best Supporting Male	—N/a	Won	
Critics' Choice Awards	2020	Best Supporting Actor in a Drama Series	The Morning Show	Won	
Critics' Choice Awards	2024	Best Supporting Actor in a Drama Series	The Morning Show	Won	
Drama Desk Awards	1997	Outstanding Featured Actor in a Play	The Three Sisters	Nominated	
Drama Desk Awards	2007	Outstanding Featured Actor in a Play	The Coast of Utopia	Nominated	
Drama Desk Awards	2018	Outstanding Solo Performance	Harry Clarke	Won	
Festival du Film de Paris	2000	Best Actor	Jesus's Son	Won	
Golden Globe Awards	2024	Best Supporting Actor – Television	The Morning Show	Nominated	
Golden Globe Awards	2026	Best Supporting Actor – Television	The Morning Show	Nominated	
Independent Spirit Awards	2001	Best Male Lead	Jesus's Son	Nominated	
Independent Spirit Awards	2015	Robert Altman Award	Spotlight	Won	
Laurence Olivier Awards	2025	Best Actor	Harry Clarke	Nominated	
MTV Movie Awards	2001	Best Line from a Movie ("I am a Golden God!")	Almost Famous	Nominated	
National Board of Review	1998	Breakthrough Performance – Male	The Hi-Lo Country	Won	
Online Film Critics Society	2000	Best Ensemble	Almost Famous	Won	
Primetime Emmy Awards	2020	Outstanding Supporting Actor in a Drama Series	The Morning Show (episode: "Chaos Is the New Cocaine")	Won	
Primetime Emmy Awards	2022	Outstanding Supporting Actor in a Drama Series	The Morning Show (episode: "My Least Favorite Year")	Nominated	
Primetime Emmy Awards	2024	Outstanding Supporting Actor in a Drama Series	The Morning Show (episode: "Ghost in the Machine")	Won	
Primetime Emmy Awards	2026	Outstanding Supporting Actor in a Drama Series	The Morning Show (episode: "The Parent Trap")	Nominated	
Satellite Awards	2002	Best Supporting Actor in a Motion Picture, Drama	Charlotte Gray	Nominated	
Theatre World Awards	1995	Best Actor	Arcadia	Won	
Tony Awards	2002	Best Actor in a Play	The Elephant Man	Nominated	
Tony Awards	2005	Best Actor in a Play	The Pillowman	Nominated	
Tony Awards	2007	Best Featured Actor in a Play	The Coast of Utopia	Won	
Tony Awards	2011	Best Featured Actor in a Play	Arcadia	Nominated	
Vancouver Film Critics Circle	2000	Best Actor	Jesus's Son / Almost Famous	Nominated	

== See also ==
- List of Primetime Emmy Award winners
