= Primetime Emmy Award for Outstanding Drama Series =

Award for outstanding television drama series

- Awarded for: Outstanding Drama Series
- Country: United States
- Presented by: Academy of Television Arts & Sciences
- First award: 1951
- Currently held by: The Pitt (2026)
- Website: emmys.com

The Primetime Emmy Award for Outstanding Drama Series is an award presented since 1951 by the Academy of Television Arts & Sciences (ATAS). The award goes to the producers of the series. The award is often cited as one of the "main awards" at the Emmys ceremonies.

== History ==
Since its institution in 1951 the award has changed names many times in its history. It was first called Best Dramatic Show from 1951 to 1954, then Best Dramatic Series in 1955 and 1956. In 1957, no specific award for drama was given, but in 1958 the category was split into two separate categories, Best Dramatic Anthology Series, and Best Dramatic Series with Continuing Characters with a winner selected from each category. The following year, the category was differently split into two separate categories, Best Dramatic Series – Less Than One Hour. In 1960, the name was changed yet again to Outstanding Program Achievement in the Field of Drama; this name was kept from 1960 to 1964. In 1966, it had its sixth name change to Outstanding Dramatic Series or Outstanding Series-Drama; this was used from 1966 until recently, when it became Outstanding Drama Series.

In 1988, Rumpole of the Bailey (PBS) was initially nominated in the Outstanding Miniseries category but the Academy ruled that the nomination was not valid a few days later and later allowed the program to compete in the Outstanding Drama Series category.

Since 2000, every single winner has been a serial drama: The West Wing (2000–2003), The Sopranos (2004, 2007), Lost (2005), 24 (2006), Mad Men (2008–2011), Homeland (2012), Breaking Bad (2013–2014), Game of Thrones (2015–2016, 2018–2019), The Handmaid's Tale (2017), Succession (2020, 2022-2023), The Crown (2021), Shōgun (2024) and The Pitt (2025-2026). Since the advent of Hill Street Blues in 1981, every winner has had some serialized arcs with the exception of Law & Order.^{[A]} The majority of these shows have won between their first and fifth seasons. Only one show have been exceeded with more than sixth seasons onwards who have won multiple times is Game of Thrones with sixth, seventh, and eighth; the remaining shows within more than sixth seasons who also won one are The Sopranos with sixth and Law & Order with seventh.

Since 1967, they are the only non-US series or television series from outside the United States to be nominated including The Avengers, The Forsyte Saga, The First Churchills, Elizabeth R, The Six Wives of Henry VIII, Upstairs, Downstairs, Rumpole of the Bailey, Downton Abbey, Bodyguard, Killing Eve, Squid Game, and Slow Horses; most non-US series are entirely United Kingdom, Squid Game is the only Asia and South Korea to do so. Elizabeth R and Upstairs, Downstairs are the only two to win, while the latter is the only one to win multiple times.

Game of Thrones, Hill Street Blues, L.A. Law, Mad Men, and The West Wing share the record for most wins in the category with four. Law & Order holds the record for most nominations in the category with eleven, while Better Call Saul holds the record for most nominations without a win with seven.

Since 2022, Squid Game (Korean) and Shōgun (Japanese) are the only non-English language series to be nominated in that category; Shōgun being the first to win.

Since 2023, The Last of Us and Fallout are the only series based on their respective video games to be nominated in that category.

== Winners and nominations ==
The following tables, divided by decade, display the winners and nominees of the "Drama Series" award, according to the Primetime Emmy Awards database:

=== 1950s ===
Year	Program	Network
Best Dramatic Show
1951 (3rd)	Pulitzer Prize Playhouse	KECA-TV
1951 (3rd)	Fireside Theatre	KTLA
1951 (3rd)	I Remember Mama	KTTV, CBS
1951 (3rd)	The Philco Television Playhouse	KNBH, NBC
1951 (3rd)	Studio One	KTTV, CBS
1952 (4th)	Studio One	CBS
1952 (4th)	Celanese Theatre	ABC
1952 (4th)	The Philco-Goodyear Television Playhouse	NBC
1952 (4th)	Pulitzer Prize Playhouse	ABC
1952 (4th)	Robert Montgomery Presents	NBC
1953 (5th) (Note: In 1953, two separate series categories existed, Best Dramatic Program and Best Mystery, Action or Adventure Program, and an award was given in each category. Robert Montgomery Presents won Best Dramatic Program, while Dragnet won Best Mystery, Action or Adventure Program.)
1953 (5th)	Best Dramatic Program	
1953 (5th)	Robert Montgomery Presents	NBC
1953 (5th)	Celanese Theatre	ABC
1953 (5th)	Kraft Television Theatre	NBC
1953 (5th)	The Philco-Goodyear Television Playhouse	NBC
1953 (5th)	Studio One	CBS
1953 (5th)	Best Mystery, Action or Adventure Program	
1953 (5th)	Dragnet	NBC
1953 (5th)	The Big Story	NBC
1953 (5th)	Foreign Intrigue	Syndicated
1953 (5th)	Martin Kane, Private Eye	NBC
1953 (5th)	Racket Squad	CBS
1954 (6th) (Note: In 1954, two separate series categories existed, Best Dramatic Program and Best Mystery, Action or Adventure Program, and an award was given in each category. The United States Steel Hour won Best Dramatic Program, while Dragnet won Best Mystery, Action or Adventure Program.)
1954 (6th)	Best Dramatic Program	
1954 (6th)	The United States Steel Hour	ABC
1954 (6th)	Kraft Television Theatre	NBC
1954 (6th)	The Philco-Goodyear Television Playhouse	NBC
1954 (6th)	Robert Montgomery Presents	NBC
1954 (6th)	Studio One	CBS
1954 (6th)	Best Mystery, Action or Adventure Program	
1954 (6th)	Dragnet	NBC
1954 (6th)	Foreign Intrigue	NBC
1954 (6th)	I Led 3 Lives	Syndicated
1954 (6th)	Suspense	CBS
1954 (6th)	The Web	CBS
1955 (7th) (Note: In 1955, three separate series categories existed, Best Dramatic Series, Best Mystery or Intrigue Series and Best Western or Adventure Series, and an award was given in each category. The United States Steel Hour won Best Dramatic Series, Dragnet won Best Mystery or Intrigue Series, while Stories of the Century won Best Action or Adventure Series.)
1955 (7th)	Best Dramatic Series	
1955 (7th)	The United States Steel Hour	ABC
1955 (7th)	Four Star Playhouse	CBS
1955 (7th)	Medic	NBC
1955 (7th)	The Philco-Goodyear Television Playhouse	NBC
1955 (7th)	Studio One	CBS
1955 (7th)	Best Mystery or Intrigue Series	
1955 (7th)	Dragnet	NBC
1955 (7th)	Foreign Intrigue	NBC
1955 (7th)	I Led 3 Lives	Syndicated
1955 (7th)	Racket Squad	Syndicated
1955 (7th)	Waterfront	Syndicated
1955 (7th)	Best Western or Adventure Series	
1955 (7th)	Stories of the Century	Syndicated
1955 (7th)	The Adventures of Wild Bill Hickok	Syndicated
1955 (7th)	Annie Oakley	Syndicated
1955 (7th)	Death Valley Days	CBS
1955 (7th)	The Roy Rogers Show	NBC
1956 (8th) (Note: In 1956, two separate series categories existed, Best Dramatic Series and Best Action or Adventure Series, and an award was given in each category. Producers' Showcase won Best Dramatic Series, while Disneyland won Best Action or Adventure Series.)
1956 (8th)	Best Dramatic Series	
1956 (8th)	Producers' Showcase	NBC
1956 (8th)	Alcoa-Goodyear Theatre	NBC
1956 (8th)	Climax!	CBS
1956 (8th)	Studio One	CBS
1956 (8th)	The United States Steel Hour	CBS
1956 (8th)	Best Action or Adventure Series	
1956 (8th)	Disneyland	ABC
1956 (8th)	Alfred Hitchcock Presents	CBS
1956 (8th)	Dragnet	NBC
1956 (8th)	Gunsmoke	CBS
1956 (8th)	The Lineup	CBS
1957 (9th) (Note: In 1957, two separate series categories existed, Best Series – Half Hour or Less and Best Series – One Hour or More, and an award was given in each category. The Phil Silvers Show, a comedy, won Best Series – Half Hour or Less, while Caesar's Hour, another comedy, won Best Series – One Hour or More. For this year (and also in 1965), dramas competed directly against comedies, musical variety, and other shows.)
1957 (9th)	Best Series – Half Hour or Less	
1957 (9th)	The Phil Silvers Show (comedy)	CBS
1957 (9th)	Alfred Hitchcock Presents (anthology)	CBS
1957 (9th)	Father Knows Best (comedy)	NBC
1957 (9th)	The Jack Benny Program (comedy)	CBS
1957 (9th)	Person to Person (interview)	CBS
1957 (9th)	Best Series – One Hour or More	
1957 (9th)	Caesar's Hour (comedy)	NBC
1957 (9th)	Climax! (drama)	CBS
1957 (9th)	The Ed Sullivan Show (musical variety)	CBS
1957 (9th)	Omnibus (educational)	CBS
1957 (9th)	The Perry Como Show (musical variety)	NBC
1958 (10th) (Note: In 1958, two separate drama series categories existed, Best Dramatic Series with Continuing Characters and Best Dramatic Anthology Series, and an award was given in each category. Gunsmoke won Best Dramatic Series with Continuing Characters, while Playhouse 90 won Best Dramatic Anthology Series.)
1958 (10th)	Best Dramatic Series with Continuing Characters	
1958 (10th)	Gunsmoke	CBS
1958 (10th)	Lassie	CBS
1958 (10th)	Maverick	ABC
1958 (10th)	Perry Mason	CBS
1958 (10th)	Wagon Train	NBC
1958 (10th)	Best Dramatic Anthology Series	
1958 (10th)	Playhouse 90	CBS
1958 (10th)	Alfred Hitchcock Presents	CBS
1958 (10th)	Climax!	CBS
1958 (10th)	Hallmark Hall of Fame	NBC
1958 (10th)	Studio One	CBS
1959 (11th) (Note: In 1959, three separate drama series categories existed, Best Dramatic Series – Less Than One Hour, Best Dramatic Series-One Hour or Longer and Best Western Series, and an award was given in each category. Alcoa-Goodyear Theatre won Best Dramatic Series-Less Than One Hour, Playhouse 90 won Best Dramatic Series – One Hour or Longer, while Maverick won Best Western Series.)
1959 (11th)	Best Dramatic Series – Less Than One Hour	
1959 (11th)	Alcoa-Goodyear Theatre	NBC
1959 (11th)	Alfred Hitchcock Presents	CBS
1959 (11th)	General Electric Theater	CBS
1959 (11th)	The Loretta Young Show	NBC
1959 (11th)	Naked City	ABC
1959 (11th)	Peter Gunn	NBC
1959 (11th)	Best Dramatic Series – One Hour or Longer	
1959 (11th)	Playhouse 90	CBS
1959 (11th)	The United States Steel Hour	CBS
1959 (11th)	Best Western Series	
1959 (11th)	Maverick	ABC
1959 (11th)	Gunsmoke	CBS
1959 (11th)	Have Gun – Will Travel	CBS
1959 (11th)	The Rifleman	ABC
1959 (11th)	Wagon Train	NBC

=== 1960s ===
Year	Program	Producers	Network
Outstanding Program Achievement in the Field of Drama
1960 (12th)
1960 (12th)	Playhouse 90 season 4		CBS
1960 (12th)	DuPont Show of the Month		CBS
1960 (12th)	The Moon and Sixpence		NBC
1960 (12th)	Ford Startime (Entire series)		NBC
1960 (12th)	The Untouchables (Season 1)		ABC
1961 (13th)
1961 (13th)	Hallmark Hall of Fame (Season 11)		NBC
1961 (13th)	Naked City (Season 2)		ABC
1961 (13th)	Sacco-Vanzetti Story		NBC
1961 (13th)	The Twilight Zone (Season 2)		CBS
1961 (13th)	The Untouchables (Season 2)		ABC
1962 (14th)
1962 (14th)	The Defenders (Season 1)		CBS
1962 (14th)	Alcoa Premiere (Season 1)		ABC
1962 (14th)	Ben Casey (Season 1)		ABC
1962 (14th)	The Dick Powell Show season 1		NBC
1962 (14th)	Hallmark Hall of Fame (Season 11)		NBC
1962 (14th)	Naked City (Season 3)		ABC
1963 (15th)
1963 (15th)	The Defenders (Season 2)		CBS
1963 (15th)	Alcoa Premiere season 2		ABC
1963 (15th)	The Dick Powell Show season 2		NBC
1963 (15th)	The Eleventh Hour season 1		NBC
1963 (15th)	Naked City (Season 4)		ABC
1964 (16th)
1964 (16th)	The Defenders (Season 3)		CBS
1964 (16th)	Bob Hope Presents the Chrysler Theatre season 1		NBC
1964 (16th)	East Side/West Side (Entire series)		CBS
1964 (16th)	Mr. Novak season 1		NBC
1964 (16th)	The Richard Boone Show (Entire series)		NBC
Outstanding Program Achievements in Entertainment
1965 (17th) (Note: For 1965 only, the Emmy Award categories were reduced so that comedy, drama, variety, and music programs competed against each other, with multiple winners possible in each category.)
1965 (17th)	The Dick Van Dyke Show (Season 4)	Carl Reiner, producer	CBS
1965 (17th)	Hallmark Hall of Fame: "The Magnificent Yankee"	George Schaefer, producer	NBC
1965 (17th)	My Name Is Barbra	Richard Lewine, producer	CBS
1965 (17th)	New York Philharmonic Young People's Concerts with Leonard Bernstein	Roger Englander, producer	CBS
1965 (17th)	The Andy Williams Show	Bob Finkel, producer	NBC
1965 (17th)	Bob Hope Presents the Chrysler Theatre season 2	Dick Berg, producer	NBC
1965 (17th)	A Carol for Another Christmas	Joseph L. Mankiewicz, producer	ABC
1965 (17th)	The Defenders (Season 4)	Bob Markell, producer	CBS
1965 (17th)	Hallmark Hall of Fame (Season 14)	George Schaefer, producer	NBC
1965 (17th)	The Man from U.N.C.L.E. (Season 1)	Sam Rolfe, producer	NBC
1965 (17th)	Mr. Novak season 2	Leonard Freeman, producer	NBC
1965 (17th)	Profiles in Courage	Robert Saudek, producer	NBC
1965 (17th)	Walt Disney's Wonderful World of Color	Walt Disney, producer	NBC
1965 (17th)	Who Has Seen the Wind?	George Sidney, producer	ABC
1965 (17th)	The Wonderful World of Burlesque	George Schaefer, producer	NBC
Outstanding Dramatic Series
1966 (18th)
1966 (18th)	The Fugitive (Season 3)	Alan A. Armer, producer	ABC
1966 (18th)	Bonanza (Season 7)	David Dortort, producer	NBC
1966 (18th)	I Spy (Season 1)	Morton Fine, producer	NBC
1966 (18th)	The Man from U.N.C.L.E. (Season 2)	Norman Felton, executive producer	NBC
1966 (18th)	Slattery's People season 2	Irving Elman, producer	CBS
1967 (19th)
1967 (19th)	Mission: Impossible (Season 1)	Joseph Gantman and Bruce Geller, producers	CBS
1967 (19th)	The Avengers (Season 4)	Julian Wintle, executive producer	ABC
1967 (19th)	I Spy (Season 2)	David Friedkin and Morton Fine, producers	NBC
1967 (19th)	Run for Your Life season 2	Jo Swerling Jr., producer	NBC
1967 (19th)	Star Trek (Season 1)	Gene Roddenberry and Gene L. Coon, producers	NBC
1968 (20th)
1968 (20th)	Mission: Impossible (Season 2)	Joseph Gantman, producer	CBS
1968 (20th)	The Avengers (Season 5)	Albert Fennell and Brian Clemens, producers	ABC
1968 (20th)	I Spy (Season 3)	David Friedkin and Morton S. Fine, producers	NBC
1968 (20th)	NET Playhouse season 2	Curtis W. Davis, executive producer	NET
1968 (20th)	Run for Your Life season 3	Roy Huggins, executive producer	NBC
1968 (20th)	Star Trek (Season 2)	Gene Roddenberry, executive producer	NBC
1969 (21st)
1969 (21st)	NET Playhouse season 3	Curtis W. Davis, executive producer	NET
1969 (21st)	The F.B.I. (Season 4)	Charles Larson, producer	ABC
1969 (21st)	Ironside (Season 2)	Cy Chermak, executive producer	NBC
1969 (21st)	Judd, for the Defense (Season 2)	Harold Gast, producer	ABC
1969 (21st)	Mission: Impossible (Season 3)	Bruce Geller, executive producer	CBS
1969 (21st)	The Name of the Game (Season 1)	Richard Irving, Leslie Stevens and David Victor, producers	NBC

=== 1970s ===
Year	Program	Producers	Network
1970 (22nd)
1970 (22nd)	Marcus Welby, M.D. (Season 1)	David Victor, executive producer; David J. O'Connell, producer	ABC
1970 (22nd)	The Forsyte Saga (Limited series)	Donald Wilson, producer	PBS
1970 (22nd)	Ironside (Season 3)	Cy Chermak, executive producer; Douglas Benton, Winston Miller, Joel Rogosin and Albert Aley, producers	NBC
1970 (22nd)	The Mod Squad (Season 2)	Danny Thomas and Aaron Spelling, executive producers; Tony Barrett and Harve Bennett, producers	ABC
1970 (22nd)	The Name of the Game (Season 2)	Richard Irving, executive producer; George Eckstein, Dean Hargrove, Norman Lloyd and Boris Sagal, producers	NBC
1970 (22nd)	NET Playhouse season 4	Jac Venza, executive producer	NET
1971 (23rd)
1971 (23rd)	The Bold Ones: The Senator (Entire series)	David Levinson, producer	NBC
1971 (23rd)	The First Churchills (Limited series)	Christopher Sarson and Donald Wilson, producers	PBS
1971 (23rd)	Ironside (Season 4)	Cy Chermak, executive producer; Douglas Benton, Winston Miller, Joel Rogosin and Albert Aley, producers	NBC
1971 (23rd)	Marcus Welby, M.D. (Season 2)	David Victor, executive producer; David J. O'Connell, producer	ABC
1971 (23rd)	NET Playhouse season 5	Jac Venza, executive producer	NET
1972 (24th)
1972 (24th)	Elizabeth R (Limited series)	Christopher Sarson, executive producer; Roderick Graham, producer	PBS
1972 (24th)	Columbo (Season 1)	Richard Levinson and William Link, executive producers; Everett Chambers, producer	NBC
1972 (24th)	Mannix (Season 5)	Bruce Geller, executive producer; Ivan Goff and Ben Roberts, producers	CBS
1972 (24th)	Marcus Welby, M.D. (Season 3)	David Victor, executive producer; David J. O'Connell, producer	ABC
1972 (24th)	The Six Wives of Henry VIII (Limited series)	Ronald Travers and Mark Shivas, producers	PBS
1973 (25th)
1973 (25th)	The Waltons (Season 1)	Lee Rich, executive producer; Robert L. Jacks, producer	CBS
1973 (25th)	Cannon (Season 2)	Quinn Martin, executive producer; Harold Gast and Adrian Samish, producers	CBS
1973 (25th)	Columbo (Season 2)	Dean Hargrove, producer	NBC
1973 (25th)	Hawaii Five-O (Season 5)	Leonard Freeman, executive producer; Bob Sweeney and Bill Finnegan, producers	CBS
1973 (25th)	Kung Fu (Season 1)	Jerry Thorpe, producer	ABC
1973 (25th)	Mannix (Season 6)	Bruce Geller, executive producer; Ivan Goff and Ben Roberts, producers	CBS
1974 (26th)
1974 (26th)	Upstairs, Downstairs (Seasons 1-2)	Rex Firkin, executive producer; John Hawkesworth, producer	PBS
1974 (26th)	Kojak (Season 1)	Abby Mann and Matthew Rapf, executive producers; James Duff McAdams, producer	CBS
1974 (26th)	Police Story (Season 1)	David Gerber, executive producer; Stanley Kallis, producer	NBC
1974 (26th)	The Streets of San Francisco (Season 2)	Quinn Martin, executive producer; John Wilder, producer	ABC
1974 (26th)	The Waltons (Season 2)	Lee Rich, executive producer; Robert L. Jacks, producer	CBS
1975 (27th)
1975 (27th)	Upstairs, Downstairs (Season 3)	Rex Firkin, executive producer; John Hawkesworth, producer	PBS
1975 (27th)	Kojak (Season 2)	Matthew Rapf, executive producer; Jack Laird and James Duff McAdams, producer	CBS
1975 (27th)	Police Story (Season 2)	David Gerber and Stanley Kallis, executive producers; Christopher Morgan, producer	NBC
1975 (27th)	The Streets of San Francisco (Season 3)	Quinn Martin, executive producer; John Wilder and William Robert Yates, producers	ABC
1975 (27th)	The Waltons (Season 3)	Lee Rich, executive producer; Robert L. Jacks, producer	CBS
1976 (28th)
1976 (28th)	Police Story (Season 3)	David Gerber and Stanley Kallis, executive producers; Liam O'Brien and Carl Pingitore, producers	NBC
1976 (28th)	Baretta (Season 2)	Bernard L. Kowalski, executive producer; Jo Swerling Jr., Robert Harris, Howie Horwitz and Robert Levin, producers	ABC
1976 (28th)	Columbo (Season 5)	Everett Chambers, producer	NBC
1976 (28th)	The Streets of San Francisco (Season 4)	Quinn Martin, executive producer; William Robert Yates, producer	ABC
1977 (29th)
1977 (29th)	Upstairs, Downstairs (Season 5)	John Hawkesworth and Joan Sullivan, producers	PBS
1977 (29th)	Baretta (Season 3)	Anthony Spinner, Bernard L. Kowalski and Leigh Vance, executive producers; Charles Dismukes, producer	ABC
1977 (29th)	Columbo (Season 6)	Everett Chambers, producer	NBC
1977 (29th)	Family (Season 2)	Aaron Spelling, Leonard Goldberg and Mike Nichols, executive producers; Nigel McKeand, producer	ABC
1977 (29th)	Police Story (Season 4)	David Gerber, executive producer; Liam O'Brien, producer; Mel Swope, co-producer	NBC
1978 (30th)
1978 (30th)	The Rockford Files (Season 4)	Meta Rosenberg, executive producer; Stephen J. Cannell, supervising producer; David Chase and Chas. Floyd Johnson, producers	NBC
1978 (30th)	Columbo (Season 7)	Richard Alan Simmons, producer	NBC
1978 (30th)	Family (Season 3)	Aaron Spelling and Leonard Goldberg, executive producers; Nigel McKeand, producer	ABC
1978 (30th)	Lou Grant (Season 1)	James L. Brooks and Allan Burns, executive producers; Gene Reynolds, producer	CBS
1978 (30th)	Quincy, M.E. (Season 3)	Glen A. Larson, Jud Kinberg and Richard Irving, executive producers; B.W. Sandefur, supervising producer; Christopher Morgan, Peter J. Thompson, Edward Montagne and Robert F. O'Neill, producers; Michael Sloan, associate executive producer	NBC
1979 (31st)
1979 (31st)	Lou Grant (Season 2)	Gene Reynolds, executive producer; Seth Freeman and Gary David Goldberg, producers	CBS
1979 (31st)	The Paper Chase (Season 1)	Robert C. Thompson, executive producer; Robert Lewin and Albert Aley, producers	CBS
1979 (31st)	The Rockford Files (Season 5)	Meta Rosenberg, executive producer; Stephen J. Cannell, supervising producer; Chas. Floyd Johnson, David Chase and Juanita Bartlett, producers	NBC

=== 1980s ===
Year	Program	Producers	Network
1980 (32nd)
1980 (32nd)	Lou Grant (Season 3)	Gene Reynolds, executive producer; Seth Freeman, producer	CBS
1980 (32nd)	Dallas (Season 3)	Philip Capice and Lee Rich executive producers; Leonard Katzman, producer	CBS
1980 (32nd)	Family (Season 5)	Leonard Goldberg and Aaron Spelling executive producers; Edward Zwick, producer	ABC
1980 (32nd)	The Rockford Files (Season 6)	Juanita Bartlett, producer	NBC
1980 (32nd)	The White Shadow (Season 2)	Bruce Paltrow, executive producer; Mark Tinker, producer	CBS
1981 (33rd)
1981 (33rd)	Hill Street Blues (Season 1)	Steven Bochco and Michael Kozoll, executive producers; Gregory Hoblit, producer	NBC
1981 (33rd)	Dallas (Season 4)	Philip Capice, executive producer; Leonard Katzman, producer	CBS
1981 (33rd)	Lou Grant (Season 4)	Gene Reynolds, executive producer; Seth Freeman, producer	CBS
1981 (33rd)	Quincy, M.E. (Season 6)	David Moessinger, executive producer; Sam Egan, producer; Lester William Berke and William O. Cairncross, supervising producers	NBC
1981 (33rd)	The White Shadow (Season 3)	Bruce Paltrow, executive producer; Mark Tinker, producer; John Masius, coordinating producer	CBS
1982 (34th)
1982 (34th)	Hill Street Blues (Season 2)	Steven Bochco, executive producer; David Anspaugh and Anthony Yerkovich, producers; Gregory Hoblit, supervising producer	NBC
1982 (34th)	Dynasty (Season 2)	Douglas S. Cramer and Aaron Spelling, executive producers; Edward Ledding and Elaine Rich, producers; E. Duke Vincent, supervising producer	ABC
1982 (34th)	Fame (Season 1)	William Blinn and Gerald I. Isenberg, executive producers; Stan Rogow and Mel Swope, producers	NBC
1982 (34th)	Lou Grant (Season 5)	Gene Reynolds, executive producer; Seth Freeman, producer	CBS
1982 (34th)	Magnum, P.I. (Season 2)	Donald P. Bellisario, executive producer; Douglas Green, Andrew Schneider and Rick Weaver, producers	CBS
1983 (35th)
1983 (35th)	Hill Street Blues (Season 3)	Steven Bochco, executive producer; Gregory Hoblit, co-executive producer; Anthony Yerkovich, supervising producer; David Anspaugh and Scott Brazil, producers	NBC
1983 (35th)	Cagney & Lacey (Season 2)	Barney Rosenzweig, executive producer; Richard M. Rosenbloom and Harry R. Sherman, supervising producers; Steve Brown, Terry Louise Fisher, April Smith and Joseph Stern, producers	CBS
1983 (35th)	Fame (Season 2)	William Blinn, executive producer; Mel Swope, producer	NBC
1983 (35th)	Magnum, P.I. (Season 3)	Donald P. Bellisario, executive producer; Douglas Green and Joel Rogosin, supervising producers; Chas. Floyd Johnson, producer; Reuben Leder and Rick Weaver, co-producers	CBS
1983 (35th)	St. Elsewhere (Season 1)	Bruce Paltrow, executive producer; Joshua Brand, John Falsey, John Masius and Mark Tinker, producers	NBC
1984 (36th)
1984 (36th)	Hill Street Blues (Season 4)	Steven Bochco, executive producer; Gregory Hoblit, co-executive producer; Scott Brazil, supervising producer; Jeff Lewis and Sascha Schneider, producers; David J. Latt, co-producer	NBC
1984 (36th)	Cagney & Lacey (Season 3)	Barney Rosenzweig, executive producer; Peter Lefcourt, producer	CBS
1984 (36th)	Fame (Season 3)	William Blinn, executive producer; Kenneth Ehrlich, producer	Syndicated
1984 (36th)	Magnum, P.I. (Season 4)	Donald P. Bellisario, executive producer; Douglas Benton and Chas. Floyd Johnson, supervising producers; Reuben Leder, producer; Nick Thiel and Rick Weaver, co-producers	CBS
1984 (36th)	St. Elsewhere (Season 2)	Bruce Paltrow, executive producer; Mark Tinker, supervising producer; Tom Fontana and John Masius, producers; Abby Singer, coordinating producer	NBC
1985 (37th)
1985 (37th)	Cagney & Lacey (Season 4)	Barney Rosenzweig, executive producer; Steve Brown, Terry Louise Fisher and Peter Lefcourt, producers	CBS
1985 (37th)	Hill Street Blues (Season 5)	Steven Bochco, executive producer; Gregory Hoblit, co-executive producer; Scott Brazil, supervising producer; Jeff Lewis, producer; David Milch, co-producer	NBC
1985 (37th)	Miami Vice (Season 1)	Michael Mann and Anthony Yerkovich, executive producers; Liam O'Brien, supervising producer; John Nicolella, producer; Mel Swope, producer; Richard Brams and George E. Crosby, co-producers	NBC
1985 (37th)	Murder, She Wrote (Season 1)	Peter S. Fischer, Richard Levinson and William Link, executive producers; Robert F. O'Neill, supervising producer/producer; Douglas Benton, producer	CBS
1985 (37th)	St. Elsewhere (Season 3)	Bruce Paltrow, executive producer; Mark Tinker, supervising producer; Tom Fontana and John Masius, producers; Abby Singer, coordinating producer	NBC
1986 (38th)
1986 (38th)	Cagney & Lacey (Season 5)	Barney Rosenzweig, executive producer; Liz Coe, supervising producer; Steve Brown, Patricia Green and Ralph S. Singleton, producers; P.K. Knelman, co-producer	CBS
1986 (38th)	Hill Street Blues (Season 6)	Jeff Lewis, executive producer; David Milch, co-executive producer; Scott Brazil, supervising producer; Michael Vittes, producer; Walon Green, co-producer; Penny Adams, coordinating producer	NBC
1986 (38th)	Moonlighting (Season 2)	Glenn Gordon Caron, executive producer; Jay Daniel, co-executive producer; Artie Mandelberg, supervising producer; Ron Osborn and Jeff Reno, producers	ABC
1986 (38th)	Murder, She Wrote (Season 2)	Peter S. Fischer, executive producer; Robert F. O'Neill, producer	CBS
1986 (38th)	St. Elsewhere (Season 4)	Bruce Paltrow, executive producer; Mark Tinker, supervising producer; Tom Fontana and John Masius, producers; Abby Singer, coordinating producer	NBC
1987 (39th)
1987 (39th)	L.A. Law (Season 1)	Steven Bochco, executive producer; Gregory Hoblit, co-executive producer; Terry Louise Fisher, supervising producer; Scott Goldstein and Ellen S. Pressman, producers; Phillip M. Goldfarb, coordinating producer	NBC
1987 (39th)	Cagney & Lacey (Season 6)	Barney Rosenzweig, executive producer; Jonathan Estrin and Shelley List, supervising producers; Georgia Jeffries and Ralph S. Singleton, producers; P.K. Knelman, co-producer	CBS
1987 (39th)	Moonlighting (Season 3)	Glenn Gordon Caron, executive producer; Jay Daniel, co-executive producer; Artie Mandelberg and Karen Hall, supervising producer; Ron Osborn, Jeff Reno and Roger Director, producers	ABC
1987 (39th)	Murder, She Wrote (Season 3)	Peter S. Fischer, executive producer; Robert F. O'Neill, producer	CBS
1987 (39th)	St. Elsewhere (Season 5)	Bruce Paltrow, executive producer; Mark Tinker, supervising producer; Tom Fontana and John Masius, producers; Abby Singer, coordinating producer	NBC
1988 (40th) (Note: In 1988, Rumpole of the Bailey was added to this category after it was nominated and disqualified in the Miniseries category.)
1988 (40th)	thirtysomething (Season 1)	Marshall Herskovitz and Edward Zwick, executive producers; Paul Haggis, supervising producer; Scott Winant, producer	ABC
1988 (40th)	Beauty and the Beast (Season 1)	Tony Thomas and Paul Junger Witt, executive producers; Ron Koslow, supervising producer; Stephen Kurzfeld, co-supervising producer; John David, Harvey Frand, Andrew Laskos, Kenneth R. Koch, George R. R. Martin and David Peckinpah, producers; Lynn Guthrie, co-producer	CBS
1988 (40th)	L.A. Law (Season 2)	Steven Bochco, executive producer; Gregory Hoblit and Rick Wallace, co-executive producers; Terry Louise Fisher, supervising producer; Scott Goldstein, producer; David E. Kelley, co-producer; Phillip M. Goldfarb, coordinating producer	NBC
1988 (40th)	Rumpole of the Bailey (Season 4)	Rebecca Eaton, series executive producer; Lloyd Shirley, executive producer; Jacqueline Davis, producer	PBS
1988 (40th)	St. Elsewhere (Season 6)	Bruce Paltrow and Mark Tinker, executive producers; John Tinker and Channing Gibson, producers; Abby Singer, coordinating producer	NBC
1989 (41st)
1989 (41st)	L.A. Law (Season 3)	Steven Bochco, executive producer; Rick Wallace, co-executive producer; David E. Kelley, supervising producer; Michele Gallery and Scott Goldstein, producers; William M. Finkelstein and Judith Parker, co-producers; Phillip M. Goldfarb and Alice West, coordinating producers	NBC
1989 (41st)	Beauty and the Beast (Season 2)	Ron Koslow, Tony Thomas and Paul Junger Witt, executive producers; Stephen Kurzfeld, supervising producer; Kenneth R. Koch and George R. R. Martin, producers; Alex Gansa, Howard Gordon and Patricia Livingston co-producers; David F. Schwartz, coordinating producer	CBS
1989 (41st)	China Beach (Season 2)	John Sacret Young, executive producer; Patricia Green, supervising producer; John Wells, producer; Geno Escarrega and Christopher Nelson; Fred Gerber, coordinating producer	ABC
1989 (41st)	thirtysomething (Season 2)	Marshall Herskovitz and Edward Zwick, executive producers; Scott Winant, supervising producer; Richard Kramer, producer; Ellen S. Pressman, co-producer; Lindsley Parsons III, coordinating producer	ABC
1989 (41st)	Wiseguy (Season 2)	Stephen J. Cannell, executive producers; Les Sheldon, co-executive producer; David J. Burke, Stephen Kronish and Jo Swerling Jr., supervising producers; Alex Beaton and Alfonse Ruggiero, producers	CBS

=== 1990s ===
Year	Program	Producers	Network
1990 (42nd)
1990 (42nd)	L.A. Law (Season 4)	David E. Kelley, executive producer; Rick Wallace, co-executive producer; William M. Finkelstein, supervising producer; Elodie Keene and Michael M. Robin, producers; Robert M. Breech, co-producer; Alice West, coordinating producer	NBC
1990 (42nd)	China Beach (Season 3)	John Sacret Young, executive producer; Georgia Jeffries and John Wells, supervising producers; Geno Escarrega, Fred Gerber and Mimi Leder, producers	ABC
1990 (42nd)	Quantum Leap (Season 2)	Donald P. Bellisario, executive producer; Deborah Pratt and Michael Zinberg, co-executive producers; Paul M. Belous, Scott Shepherd, Harker Wade and Robert Wolterstorff, supervising producers; Paul Brown, Jeff Gourson and Chris Ruppenthal, co-producers	NBC
1990 (42nd)	thirtysomething (Season 3)	Marshall Herskovitz and Edward Zwick, executive producers; Scott Winant, supervising producer; Richard Kramer, producer; Ellen S. Pressman, co-producer; Lindsley Parsons III, coordinating producer	ABC
1990 (42nd)	Twin Peaks (Season 1)	Mark Frost and David Lynch, executive producers; Gregg Fienberg and David J. Latt, producers	ABC
1991 (43rd)
1991 (43rd)	L.A. Law (Season 5)	Robert Breech, Alan Brennert, Patricia Green, James C. Hart, John Hill, Elodie Keene, David E. Kelley, Rick Wallace and Alice West	NBC
1991 (43rd)	China Beach (Season 4)	Geno Escarrega, Carol Flint, Mimi Leder, John Wells, Lydia Woodward and John Sacret Young	ABC
1991 (43rd)	Northern Exposure (Seasons 1–2)	Cheryl Bloch, Joshua Brand, John Falsey, Diane Frolov, Robin Green, Matthew Nodella, Charles Rosin, Andrew Schneider and Robert T. Skodis	CBS
1991 (43rd)	Quantum Leap (Season 3)	Donald P. Bellisario, Paul Brown, Jeff Gourson, Deborah Pratt, Chris Ruppenthal, Harker Wade, Robert Wolterstorff and Michael Zinberg	NBC
1991 (43rd)	thirtysomething (Season 4)	Joseph Dougherty, Ann Lewis Hamilton, Marshall Herskovitz, Richard Kramer, Lindsley Parsons III, Ellen S. Pressman, Scott Winant and Edward Zwick	ABC
1992 (44th)
1992 (44th)	Northern Exposure (Season 3)	Cheryl Bloch, Joshua Brand, John Falsey, Diane Frolov, Robin Green, Jeff Melvoin, Matthew Nodella, Andrew Schneider and Rob Thompson	CBS
1992 (44th)	I'll Fly Away (Season 1)	Joshua Brand, David Chase, John Falsey, Barbara Hall, John Forrest Niss and Ian Sander	NBC
1992 (44th)	L.A. Law (Season 6)	Don Behrns, Steven Bochco, Robert Breech, Alan Brennert, Carol Flint, Patricia Green, James C. Hart, Elodie Keene and Rick Wallace	NBC
1992 (44th)	Law & Order (Season 2)	David Black, Michael Duggan, Jeffrey Hayes, Robert Stuart Nathan, Robert Palm, Daniel Sackheim, Joseph Stern and Dick Wolf	NBC
1992 (44th)	Quantum Leap (Season 4)	Donald P. Bellisario, David Bellisario, Paul Brown, Jeff Gourson, Deborah Pratt, Chris Ruppenthal, Tommy Thompson, Harker Wade and Michael Zinberg	NBC
1993 (45th)
1993 (45th)	Picket Fences (Season 1)	Robert Breech, David E. Kelley, Mark B. Perry, Jonathan Pontell, Michael Pressman and Alice West	CBS
1993 (45th)	Homefront (Season 2)	Christopher Chulack, David Jacobs, Lynn Marie Latham, Bernard Lechowick, Dianne Massock and Jim Stanley	ABC
1993 (45th)	I'll Fly Away (Season 2)	Joshua Brand, Henry Bromell, David Chase, John Falsey, Barbara Hall, John Forrest Niss and Ian Sander	NBC
1993 (45th)	Law & Order (Season 3)	Michael S. Chernuchin, Arthur Forney, Walon Green, Jeffrey Hayes, Robert Stuart Nathan, Joseph Stern and Dick Wolf	NBC
1993 (45th)	Northern Exposure (Season 4)	Cheryl Bloch, Joshua Brand, Martin Bruestle, John Falsey, Diane Frolov, Robin Green, Jeff Melvoin, Andrew Schneider, Rob Thompson and Michael Vittes	CBS
1994 (46th)
1994 (46th)	Picket Fences (Season 2)	Robert Breech, Ann Donahue, David E. Kelley, Geoffrey Neigher, Jack Philbrick, Jonathan Pontell, Michael Pressman and Alice West	CBS
1994 (46th)	Law & Order (Season 4)	René Balcer, Michael S. Chernuchin, Arthur Forney, Lew Gould, Walon Green, Jeffrey Hayes, Robert Stuart Nathan, Edwin Sherin and Dick Wolf	NBC
1994 (46th)	Northern Exposure (Season 5)	Cheryl Bloch, Martin Bruestle, David Chase, Michael Fresco, Diane Frolov, Robin Green, Barbara Hall, Jeff Melvoin, Andrew Schneider and Michael Vittes	CBS
1994 (46th)	NYPD Blue (Season 1)	Burton Armus, Steven Bochco, Steven DePaul, Robert J. Doherty, Gregory Hoblit, Ted Mann, David Milch, Michael M. Robin and Gardner Stern	ABC
1994 (46th)	Star Trek: The Next Generation (Season 7)	Rick Berman, Brannon Braga, Merri Howard, Peter Lauritson, David Livingston, Ronald D. Moore, Wendy Neuss, Michael Piller and Jeri Taylor	Syndicated
1995 (47th)
1995 (47th)	NYPD Blue (Season 2)	Burton Armus, Steven Bochco, Bill Clark, Steven DePaul, Robert J. Doherty, Charles H. Eglee, Channing Gibson, Walon Green, Gregory Hoblit, Ted Mann, David Milch, Michael M. Robin, Gardner Stern and Mark Tinker	ABC
1995 (47th)	Chicago Hope (Season 1)	Michael Braverman, Dennis Cooper, Rob Corn, Michael Dinner, David E. Kelley, James C. Hart, John Heath, Michael Pressman and John Tinker	CBS
1995 (47th)	ER (Season 1)	Christopher Chulack, Michael Crichton, Mimi Leder, Paul Manning, Dennis Murphy, Robert Stuart Nathan, John Wells and Lydia Woodward	NBC
1995 (47th)	Law & Order (Season 5)	René Balcer, Michael S. Chernuchin, Arthur Forney, Lew Gould, Jeffrey Hayes, Mark B. Perry, Edwin Sherin, Dick Wolf and Ed Zuckerman	NBC
1995 (47th)	The X-Files (Season 2)	Chris Carter, executive producer; R. W. Goodwin, Glen Morgan and James Wong, co-executive producers; Howard Gordon, supervising producer; Rob Bowman, Joseph Patrick Finn, Kim Manners and David Nutter, producers; Paul Rabwin, co-producer	Fox
1996 (48th)
1996 (48th)	ER (Season 2)	Christopher Chulack, Michael Crichton, Carol Flint, Mimi Leder, Paul Manning, Wendy Spence, John Wells and Lydia Woodward	NBC
1996 (48th)	Chicago Hope (Season 2)	Kevin Arkadie, Rob Corn, Bill D'Elia, Michael Dinner, Patricia Green, James C. Hart, David E. Kelley and John Tinker	CBS
1996 (48th)	Law & Order (Season 6)	René Balcer, Michael S. Chernuchin, Arthur Forney, Billy Fox, Morgan Gendel, Lew Gould, Jeffrey Hayes, Edwin Sherin, Dick Wolf and Ed Zuckerman	NBC
1996 (48th)	NYPD Blue (Season 3)	Steven Bochco, Bill Clark, Steven DePaul, Robert Doherty, David Milch, Theresa Rebeck, Michael M. Robin, Gardner Stern and Mark Tinker	ABC
1996 (48th)	The X-Files (Season 3)	Rob Bowman, Chris Carter, Joseph Patrick Finn, R. W. Goodwin, Howard Gordon, Kim Manners and Paul Rabwin	Fox
1997 (49th)
1997 (49th)	Law & Order (Season 7)	René Balcer, Arthur Forney, Billy Fox, Lewis H. Gould, Jeffrey Hayes, Edwin Sherin, Gardner Stern, Dick Wolf, Ed Zuckerman and Jeremy R. Littman	NBC
1997 (49th)	Chicago Hope (Season 3)	Rob Corn, Bill D'Elia, James C. Hart, John Heath, Tim Kring, Dawn Prestwich, John Tinker and Nicole Yorkin	CBS
1997 (49th)	ER (Season 3)	Penny Adams, Neal Baer, Christopher Chulack, Michael Crichton, Carol Flint, Lance Gentile, Paul Manning, Wendy Spence, John Wells and Lydia Woodward	NBC
1997 (49th)	NYPD Blue (Season 4)	Steven Bochco, Bill Clark, Steven DePaul, Robert Doherty, David Milch, David Mills, Theresa Rebeck, Michael M. Robin, Mark Tinker and Michael W. Watkins	ABC
1997 (49th)	The X-Files (Season 4)	Chris Carter, R. W. Goodwin and Howard Gordon, executive producers; Rob Bowman, Joseph Patrick Finn and Kim Manners, producers; Vince Gilligan, Paul Rabwin and Frank Spotnitz, co-producers; Lori Jo Nemhauser, associate producer; Ken Horton, Glen Morgan and James Wong, consulting producers	Fox
1998 (50th)
1998 (50th)	The Practice (Season 2)	Robert Breech, David E. Kelley, Jeffrey Kramer, Christina Musrey, Jonathan Pontell, Ed Redlich, Gary Strangis, Alice West and Pam Wisne	ABC
1998 (50th)	ER (Season 4)	Penny Adams, Neal Baer, Christopher Chulack, Michael Crichton, Carol Flint, Lance Gentile, Walon Green, David Mills, Jack Orman, Tom Park, Wendy Spence Rosato, John Wells and Lydia Woodward	NBC
1998 (50th)	Law & Order (Season 8)	René Balcer, David Black, William N. Fordes, Arthur Forney, Billy Fox, Lewis H. Gould, Jeffrey Hayes, Kathy McCormick, I. C. Rapoport, Edwin Sherin, David Shore, Richard Sweren and Dick Wolf	NBC
1998 (50th)	NYPD Blue (Season 5)	Kevin Arkadie, Paris Barclay, Steven Bochco, Bill Clark, Steven DePaul, Robert Doherty, David Milch and Mark Tinker	ABC
1998 (50th)	The X-Files (Season 5)	Chris Carter and R. W. Goodwin, executive producers; Frank Spotnitz, co-executive producer; Vince Gilligan, supervising producer; Rob Bowman, Joseph Patrick Finn and Kim Manners, producers; Lori Jo Nemhauser, co-producer; Ken Horton, consulting producer; Paul Rabwin and John Shiban	Fox
1999 (51st)
1999 (51st)	The Practice (Season 3)	Robert Breech, David E. Kelley, Jeffrey Kramer, Christina Musrey, Gary Strangis and Pamela Wisne	ABC
1999 (51st)	ER (Season 5)	Penny Adams, Neal Baer, Christopher Chulack, Michael Crichton, Carol Flint, Jonathan Kaplan, Jack Orman, Wendy Spence Rosato, John Wells and Lydia Woodward	NBC
1999 (51st)	Law & Order (Season 9)	René Balcer, William N. Fordes, Billy Fox, Lewis H. Gould, Jeffrey Hayes, Kathy McCormick, Edwin Sherin, David Shore, Richard Sweren, Dick Wolf and Ed Zuckerman	NBC
1999 (51st)	NYPD Blue (Season 6)	Paris Barclay, Steven Bochco, Bill Clark, Steven DePaul, Robert Doherty, Leonard Gardner, David Milch, Doug Palau, Meredith Stiehm, Mark Tinker and Nicholas Wootton	ABC
1999 (51st)	The Sopranos (Season 1)	Mitchell Burgess, David Chase, Allen Coulter, Robin Green, Brad Grey, Ilene S. Landress and Frank Renzulli	HBO

=== 2000s ===
Year	Program	Producers	Network
2000 (52nd)
2000 (52nd)	The West Wing (Season 1)	Kristin Harms, Thomas Schlamme, Aaron Sorkin, John Wells and Llewellyn Wells	NBC
2000 (52nd)	ER (Season 6)	Penny Adams, Neal Baer, Michael Crichton, R. Scott Gemmill, Patrick Harbinson, Jonathan Kaplan, Jack Orman, Wendy Spence Rosato, Richard Thorpe, John Wells and Lydia Woodward	NBC
2000 (52nd)	Law & Order (Season 10)	René Balcer, William N. Fordes, Billy Fox, Lewis H. Gould, Jeffrey Hayes, Lynn Mamet, Kathy McCormick, Barry Schindel, Edwin Sherin, Richard Sweren and Dick Wolf	NBC
2000 (52nd)	The Practice (Season 4)	Robert Breech, David E. Kelley, Jeffrey Kramer, Christina Musrey, Gary Strangis and Pamela Wisne	ABC
2000 (52nd)	The Sopranos (Season 2)	Mitchell Burgess, David Chase, Allen Coulter, Robin Green, Brad Grey, Todd A. Kessler, Ilene S. Landress, Frank Renzulli and Terence Winter	HBO
2001 (53rd)
2001 (53rd)	The West Wing (Season 2)	Thomas Schlamme, Aaron Sorkin and John Wells, executive producers; Kevin Falls, co-executive producer; Kristin Harms, Michael Hissrich and Lawrence O'Donnell, Jr., producers; Llewellyn Wells, produced by	NBC
2001 (53rd)	ER (Season 7)	Neal Baer, Michael Crichton, Jack Orman and John Wells, executive producers; Meredith Stiehm, co-executive producer; R. Scott Gemmill and Dee Johnson, supervising producers; Jonathan Kaplan, Christopher Misiano, Wendy Rosato and Joe Sachs, producers; Richard Thorpe, produced by	NBC
2001 (53rd)	Law & Order (Season 11)	William M. Finkelstein, Jeffrey Hayes, Arthur Penn, Barry Schindel and Dick Wolf, executive producers; Arthur Forney, Kathy McCormick and Richard Sweren, co-executive producers; William Fordes and Lynn Mamet, supervising producers; Lewis H. Gould, Kati Johnston and Gary Karr, producers	NBC
2001 (53rd)	The Practice (Season 5)	Robert Breech and David E. Kelley, executive producers; Christina Musrey, supervising producer; Joseph Berger-Davis, Todd Ellis Kessler, Gary Strangis and Pamela Wisne, producers	ABC
2001 (53rd)	The Sopranos (Season 3)	Mitchell Burgess, David Chase, Robin Green and Brad Grey, executive producers; Ilene S. Landress, co-executive producer; Terence Winter, supervising producer; Henry Bronchtein, Martin Bruestle and Todd A. Kessler, producers	HBO
2002 (54th)
2002 (54th)	The West Wing (Season 3)	Thomas Schlamme, Aaron Sorkin and John Wells, executive producers; Kevin Falls, co-executive producer; Alex Graves and Christopher Misiano, supervising producers; Kristin Harms, Michael Hissrich and Llewellyn Wells, producers	NBC
2002 (54th)	CSI: Crime Scene Investigation (Season 2)	Jerry Bruckheimer, Ann Donahue, Carol Mendelsohn and Anthony E. Zuiker, executive producers; Jonathan Littman and Sam Strangis, co-executive producers; Danny Cannon, Cindy Chvatal and William Petersen, supervising producers	CBS
2002 (54th)	Law & Order (Season 12)	Jeffrey Hayes, Peter Jankowski, Barry Schindel and Dick Wolf, executive producers; Arthur Forney, Lewis H. Gould, Eric Overmyer and Richard Sweren, co-executive producers; William N. Fordes, supervising producer; Wendy Battles, Gary Karr and Roz Weinman, producers; Kati Johnston, produced by	NBC
2002 (54th)	Six Feet Under (Seasons 1–2)	Alan Ball, Robert Greenblatt, David Janollari and Alan Poul, executive producers; Bruce Eric Kaplan and Christian Williams, co-executive producers; Laurence Andries, Scott Buck and Rick Cleveland, supervising producers; Joey Soloway (as Jill Soloway) and Christian Taylor, producers	HBO
2002 (54th)	24 (Season 1)	Robert Cochran, Brian Grazer, Tony Krantz and Joel Surnow, executive producers; Howard Gordon and Stephen Hopkins, co-executive producers; Cyrus Yavneh, produced by	Fox
2003 (55th)
2003 (55th)	The West Wing (Season 4)	Thomas Schlamme, Aaron Sorkin and John Wells, executive producers; Kevin Falls, Alex Graves, Christopher Misiano and Llewellyn Wells, co-executive producers; Paul Redford, supervising producer; Neal Ahern Jr. and Kristin Harms, producers	NBC
2003 (55th)	CSI: Crime Scene Investigation (Season 3)	Jerry Bruckheimer, Danny Cannon, Ann Donahue, Carol Mendelsohn and Anthony E. Zuiker, executive producers; Cindy Chvatal, Jonathan Littman, William Petersen and Naren Shankar, co-executive producers; Andrew Lipsitz, supervising producer; Josh Berman, Kenneth Fink, Richard J. Lewis and Louis Milito, producers	CBS
2003 (55th)	Six Feet Under (Season 3)	Alan Ball, Robert Greenblatt, David Janollari and Alan Poul, executive producers; Bruce Eric Kaplan, co-executive producers; Scott Buck, Rick Cleveland and Joey Soloway (as Jill Soloway), supervising producers; Robert Del Valle, Lori Jo Nemhauser and Kate Robin, producers	HBO
2003 (55th)	The Sopranos (Season 4)	Mitchell Burgess, David Chase, Robin Green, Brad Grey and Ilene S. Landress, executive producers; Terence Winter, co-executive producer; Henry Bronchtein and Martin Bruestle, producers	HBO
2003 (55th)	24 (Season 2)	Robert Cochran, Howard Gordon, Brian Grazer, Tony Krantz and Joel Surnow, executive producers; Jon Cassar, Michael Loceff, Norman Powell and Kiefer Sutherland, producers	Fox
2004 (56th)
2004 (56th)	The Sopranos (Season 5)	Mitchell Burgess, David Chase, Robin Green, Brad Grey, Ilene S. Landress and Terence Winter, executive producers; Henry Bronchtein, co-executive producer; Matthew Weiner, supervising producer; Martin Bruestle, producer	HBO
2004 (56th)	CSI: Crime Scene Investigation (Season 4)	Jerry Bruckheimer, Danny Cannon, Cindy Chvatal, Ann Donahue, Jonathan Littman, Carol Mendelsohn, William Petersen and Anthony E. Zuiker, executive producers; Andrew Lipsitz and Naren Shankar, co-executive producers; Josh Berman, supervising producer; Elizabeth Devine, Kenneth Fink, Bruce Golin, Richard J. Lewis and Louis Milito, producers	CBS
2004 (56th)	Joan of Arcadia (Season 1)	Barbara Hall and James Hayman, executive producers; Randy Anderson and Peter Schindler, co-executive producers; Tom Garrigus, producer	CBS
2004 (56th)	24 (Season 3)	Robert Cochran, Howard Gordon, Brian Grazer, Tony Krantz and Joel Surnow, executive producers; Evan Katz and Kiefer Sutherland, co-executive producers; Michael Loceff, supervising producer; Jon Cassar, Tim Iacofano and Stephen Kronish, producers	Fox
2004 (56th)	The West Wing (Season 5)	John Wells, executive producer; Alex Graves, Christopher Misiano and Llewellyn Wells, co-executive producers; Carol Flint, Alexa Junge, Peter Noah, Paul Redford and John Sacret Young, supervising producers; Eli Attie, Kristin Harms and Andrew Stearn, producers	NBC
2005 (57th)
2005 (57th)	Lost (Season 1)	J. J. Abrams, Jack Bender, Bryan Burk, Carlton Cuse and Damon Lindelof, executive producers; Jesse Alexander and David Fury, co-executive producers; Javier Grillo-Marxuach, supervising producer; Sarah Caplan and Leonard Dick, producers; Jean Higgins, produced by	ABC
2005 (57th)	Deadwood (Season 2)	Gregg Fienberg and David Milch, executive producers; Scott Stephens and Jody Worth, supervising producers; Ed Bianchi, Ted Mann and Elizabeth Sarnoff, producers	HBO
2005 (57th)	Six Feet Under (Season 4)	Alan Ball, Robert Greenblatt, David Janollari, Bruce Eric Kaplan and Alan Poul, executive producers; Scott Buck and Rick Cleveland, co-executive producers; Joey Soloway (as Jill Soloway), supervising producer; Robert Del Valle, Lori Jo Nemhauser and Kate Robin, producers	HBO
2005 (57th)	24 (Season 4)	Robert Cochran, Howard Gordon, Brian Grazer, Evan Katz and Joel Surnow, executive producers; Jon Cassar, Stephen Kronish, Peter M. Lenkov, Michael Loceff and Kiefer Sutherland, co-executive producers; Tim Iacofano, producer	Fox
2005 (57th)	The West Wing (Season 6)	Alex Graves, Christopher Misiano and John Wells, executive producers; Carol Flint, Peter Noah and John Sacret Young, supervising producers; Eli Attie, Kristin Harms and Andrew Stearn, producers; Michael Hissrich, produced by	NBC
2006 (58th)
2006 (58th)	24 (Season 5)	Robert Cochran, Howard Gordon, Brian Grazer, Evan Katz and Joel Surnow, executive producers; Jon Cassar, Manny Coto, David Fury, Stephen Kronish, Michael Loceff and Kiefer Sutherland, co-executive producers; Michael Klick and Brad Turner, producers	Fox
2006 (58th)	Grey's Anatomy (Season 2)	Betsy Beers, Mark Gordon, James D. Parriott and Shonda Rhimes, executive producers; Peter Horton, Krista Vernoff and Mark Wilding, co-executive producers; Kip Koenig, Mimi Schmir, Gabrielle Stanton and Harry Werksman, supervising producers; Tony Phelan and Joan Rater, producers; Rob Corn, produced by	ABC
2006 (58th)	House (Season 2)	Paul Attanasio, Katie Jacobs, David Shore and Bryan Singer, executive producers; Doris Egan, Russel Friend, Garrett Lerner, Thomas L. Moran and David Semel, co-executive producers; Matt Witten, supervising producer; Lawrence Kaplow and Gerrit van der Meer, producers	Fox
2006 (58th)	The Sopranos (Season 6 Part 1) ^{[B]}	David Chase, Brad Grey, Ilene S. Landress and Terence Winter, executive producers; Henry Bronchtein and Matthew Weiner, co-executive producers; Diane Frolov and Andrew Schneider, supervising producers; Martin Bruestle and Gianna Maria Smart, producers	HBO
2006 (58th)	The West Wing (Season 7)	Alex Graves, Christopher Misiano, Peter Noah, Lawrence O'Donnell, Jr. and John Wells, executive producers; Eli Attie, supervising producer; Debora Cahn, Kristin Harms, Andrew Stearn and Patrick Ward, producers; Michael Hissrich, produced by	NBC
2007 (59th)
2007 (59th)	The Sopranos (Season 6 Part 2) ^{[B]}	David Chase, Brad Grey, Ilene S. Landress, Terence Winter and Matthew Weiner, executive producers; Henry Bronchtein, co-executive producer; Diane Frolov and Andrew Schneider, supervising producers; Martin Bruestle and Gianna Maria Smart, producers	HBO
2007 (59th)	Boston Legal (Season 3)	David E. Kelley, Bill D'Elia and Janet Leahy, executive producers; Mike Listo, co-executive producer; Steve Robin, supervising producer; Janet Knutsen McCann, producer	ABC
2007 (59th)	Grey's Anatomy (Season 3)	Shonda Rhimes, Betsy Beers, Mark Gordon, Peter Horton and Krista Vernoff, executive producers; Mark Wilding, Allan Heinberg and Tony Phelan, co-executive producers; Joan Rater, Debora Cahn and Kip Koenig, supervising producers; Linda Klein, producer; Rob Corn, produced by	ABC
2007 (59th)	Heroes (Season 1)	Tim Kring, Dennis Hammer and Allan Arkush, executive producers; Greg Beeman, Jesse Alexander, Jeph Loeb, Michael Green, Bryan Fuller and Natalie Chaidez, co-executive producers; Adam Armus and Kay Foster, supervising producers; Jim Chory, produced by	NBC
2007 (59th)	House (Season 3)	David Shore, Katie Jacobs, Paul Attanasio, Bryan Singer and Daniel Sackheim, executive producers; Russel Friend, Garrett Lerner, Thomas L. Moran and Doris Egan, co-executive producers; Peter Blake and Leonard Dick, supervising producers; Lawrence Kaplow and Gerrit van der Meer, producers	Fox
2008 (60th)
2008 (60th)	Mad Men (Season 1)	Matthew Weiner, executive producer; Tom Palmer, co-executive producer; Scott Hornbacher, Lisa Albert, Andre Jacquemetton and Maria Jacquemetton, producers	AMC
2008 (60th)	Boston Legal (Season 4)	David E. Kelley and Bill D'Elia, executive producers; Mike Listo and Lawrence Broch, co-executive producers; Steve Robin, supervising producer; Janet Knutsen, producer	ABC
2008 (60th)	Damages (Season 1)	Todd A. Kessler, Glenn Kessler, Daniel Zelman and Mark Baker, executive producers	FX
2008 (60th)	Dexter (Season 2)	John Goldwyn, Sara Colleton, Clyde Phillips and Daniel Cerone, executive producers; Melissa Rosenberg and Scott Buck, co-executive producers; Robert Lloyd Lewis, produced by	Showtime
2008 (60th)	House (Season 4)	Paul Attanasio, Katie Jacobs, David Shore, Bryan Singer, Russel Friend, Garrett Lerner and Thomas L. Moran, executive producers; Gerrit van der Meer, Peter Blake, Eli Attie, Doris Egan and Deran Sarafian, co-executive producers; Leonard Dick, supervising producer; Marcy G. Kaplan, producer	Fox
2008 (60th)	Lost (Season 4)	J. J. Abrams, Damon Lindelof, Carlton Cuse, Bryan Burk and Jack Bender, executive producers; Edward Kitsis, Adam Horowitz, Drew Goddard, Stephen Williams and Jean Higgins, co-executive producers; Elizabeth Sarnoff, supervising producer; Patricia Churchill and Ra'uf Glasgow, producers	ABC
2009 (61st)
2009 (61st)	Mad Men (Season 2)	Matthew Weiner, executive producer; Scott Hornbacher, co-executive producer; Andre Jacquemetton, Maria Jacquemetton and Lisa Albert, supervising producers	AMC
2009 (61st)	Big Love (Season 3)	Mark V. Olsen, Will Scheffer, Tom Hanks, Gary Goetzman and David Knoller, executive producers; Bernadette Caulfield, co-executive producer; Steve Turner, producer	HBO
2009 (61st)	Breaking Bad (Season 2)	Vince Gilligan and Mark Johnson, executive producers; Melissa Bernstein and Stewart A. Lyons, producers; Karen Moore, produced by	AMC
2009 (61st)	Damages (Season 2)	Todd A. Kessler, Glenn Kessler and Daniel Zelman, executive producers; Aaron Zelman, co-executive producer; Mark Baker, producer	FX
2009 (61st)	Dexter (Season 3)	John Goldwyn, Sara Colleton, Clyde Phillips and Charles H. Eglee, executive producers; Melissa Rosenberg and Scott Buck, co-executive producers; Tim Schlattmann, producer; Robert Lloyd Lewis, produced by	Showtime
2009 (61st)	House (Season 5)	Paul Attanasio, Katie Jacobs, David Shore, Bryan Singer, Thomas L. Moran, Russel Friend, Garrett Lerner and Hugh Laurie, executive producers; Gerrit van der Meer, Deran Sarafian, Doris Egan, Eli Attie, Peter Blake, Leonard Dick and Lawrence Kaplow, co-executive producers; Liz Friedman, supervising producer; David Foster, David Hoselton and Marcy G. Kaplan, producers	Fox
2009 (61st)	Lost (Season 5)	J. J. Abrams, Jack Bender, Bryan Burk, Carlton Cuse, Adam Horowitz, Edward Kitsis and Damon Lindelof, executive producers; Jean Higgins, Elizabeth Sarnoff and Stephen Williams, co-executive producers; Paul Zbyszewski, supervising producer; Patricia Churchill, Ra'uf Glasgow and Brian K. Vaughan, producers	ABC

=== 2010s ===
Year	Program	Producers	Network
2010 (62nd)
2010 (62nd)	Mad Men (Season 3)	Matthew Weiner and Scott Hornbacher, executive producers; Lisa Albert, supervising producer; Blake McCormick and Dwayne Shattuck, producers	AMC
2010 (62nd)	Breaking Bad (Season 3)	Vince Gilligan and Mark Johnson, executive producers; Michelle MacLaren, co-executive producer; Sam Catlin, supervising producer; Melissa Bernstein, Peter Gould, George Mastras and Thomas Schnauz, producers; Stewart A. Lyons, produced by	AMC
2010 (62nd)	Dexter (Season 4)	John Goldwyn, Sara Colleton, Clyde Phillips, Charles H. Eglee, Melissa Rosenberg and Scott Buck, executive producers; Tim Schlattmann and Wendy West, supervising producers; Lauren Gussis, producer; Robert Lloyd Lewis, produced by	Showtime
2010 (62nd)	The Good Wife (Season 1)	Robert King, Michelle King, Ridley Scott, Tony Scott, David W. Zucker and Brooke Kennedy, executive producers; Todd Ellis Kessler and Ted Humphrey, co-executive producers	CBS
2010 (62nd)	Lost (Season 6)	Damon Lindelof, J. J. Abrams, Carlton Cuse, Edward Kitsis, Adam Horowitz, Elizabeth Sarnoff, Jack Bender, Bryan Burk, and Jean Higgins, executive producers; Paul Zbyszewski, co-executive producer; Melinda Hsu Taylor and Ra'uf Glasgow, producers	ABC
2010 (62nd)	True Blood (Season 2)	Alan Ball and Gregg Fienberg, executive producers; Brian Buckner and Nancy Oliver, co-executive producers; Alexander Woo, supervising producer; Raelle Tucker and Mark McNair, producers	HBO
2011 (63rd)
2011 (63rd)	Mad Men (Season 4)	Matthew Weiner and Scott Hornbacher, executive producers; Andre Jacquemetton and Maria Jacquemetton, co-executive producers; Dahvi Waller, Jonathan Abrahams, Dwayne Shattuck and Blake McCormick, producers	AMC
2011 (63rd)	Boardwalk Empire (Season 1)	Terence Winter, Martin Scorsese, Mark Wahlberg, Stephen Levinson and Tim Van Patten, executive producers; Eugene Kelly and Lawrence Konner, co-executive producers; Howard Korder and Margaret Nagle, supervising producers; Rick Yorn and Rudd Simmons, producers	HBO
2011 (63rd)	Dexter (Season 5)	John Goldwyn, Sara Colleton, Chip Johannessen, Manny Coto, Scott Buck and Michael C. Hall, executive producers; Tim Schlattmann and Wendy West, co-executive producers; Lauren Gussis, supervising producer; Robert Lloyd Lewis, produced by	Showtime
2011 (63rd)	Friday Night Lights (Season 5)	Brian Grazer, David Nevins, Peter Berg, Sarah Aubrey, David Hudgins and Jason Katims, executive producers; John Cameron, Patrick Massett, John Zinman and Bridget Carpenter, co-executive producers; Rolin Jones, supervising producer; Ron Fitzgerald, Michael Waxman and Kerry Ehrin, producers; Nan Bernstein Freed, produced by	DirecTV
2011 (63rd)	Game of Thrones (Season 1)	David Benioff and D. B. Weiss, executive producers; George R. R. Martin, Vince Gerardis, Ralph Vicinanza, Guymon Casady and Carolyn Strauss, co-executive producers; Frank Doelger and Mark Huffam, producers	HBO
2011 (63rd)	The Good Wife (Season 2)	Ridley Scott, Tony Scott, Robert King, Michelle King, David W. Zucker and Brooke Kennedy, executive producers; Ted Humphrey, Leonard Dick and Keith Eisner, co-executive producers; Courtney A. Kemp and Corinne Brinkerhoff, producers	CBS
2012 (64th)
2012 (64th)	Homeland (Season 1)	Alex Gansa, Howard Gordon, Michael Cuesta, Gideon Raff, Avi Nir and Ran Tellem, executive producers; Chip Johannessen and Alexander Cary, co-executive producers; Michael Klick, producer; Henry Bromell and Meredith Stiehm, consulting producers	Showtime
2012 (64th)	Boardwalk Empire (Season 2)	Terence Winter, Martin Scorsese, Mark Wahlberg, Stephen Levinson and Tim Van Patten, executive producers; Eugene Kelly and Howard Korder, co-executive producers; Rick Yorn and Joe Iberti, producers	HBO
2012 (64th)	Breaking Bad (Season 4)	Vince Gilligan, Mark Johnson and Michelle MacLaren, executive producers; Melissa Bernstein and Sam Catlin, co-executive producers; Peter Gould, George Mastras and Thomas Schnauz, supervising producers; Moira Walley-Beckett, Bryan Cranston and Diane Mercer, producers; Stewart A. Lyons, produced by	AMC
2012 (64th)	Downton Abbey (Season 2)	Gareth Neame, Julian Fellowes and Rebecca Eaton, executive producers; Liz Trubridge, producer	PBS
2012 (64th)	Game of Thrones (Season 2)	David Benioff, D. B. Weiss, Frank Doelger and Carolyn Strauss, executive producers; George R. R. Martin, Vanessa Taylor, Alan Taylor, Guymon Casady and Vince Gerardis, co-executive producers; Bernadette Caulfield, producer by	HBO
2012 (64th)	Mad Men (Season 5)	Matthew Weiner, Scott Hornbacher, Andre Jacquemetton and Maria Jacquemetton, executive producers; Victor Levin, co-executive producer; Jon Hamm and Blake McCormick, producers	AMC
2013 (65th)
2013 (65th)	Breaking Bad (Season 5 Part 1)^{[C]}	Vince Gilligan, Mark Johnson and Michelle MacLaren, executive producers; Melissa Bernstein, Sam Catlin, Peter Gould, George Mastras and Thomas Schnauz, co-executive producers; Moira Walley-Beckett, supervising producer; Bryan Cranston and Diane Mercer, producers; Stewart A. Lyons, produced by	AMC
2013 (65th)	Downton Abbey (Season 3)	Gareth Neame and Julian Fellowes, executive producers; Nigel Marchant, co-executive producer; Liz Trubridge, producer	PBS
2013 (65th)	Game of Thrones (Season 3)	David Benioff, D. B. Weiss, Carolyn Strauss, Frank Doelger and Bernadette Caulfield, executive producers; Guymon Casady, Vince Gerardis, George R. R. Martin and Vanessa Taylor, co-executive producers; Chris Newman and Greg Spence, producers	HBO
2013 (65th)	Homeland (Season 2)	Alex Gansa, Howard Gordon, Michael Cuesta, Gideon Raff, Avi Nir, Ran Tellem, Meredith Stiehm, Chip Johannessen, Alexander Cary and Henry Bromell, executive producers; Michael Klick, producer	Showtime
2013 (65th)	House of Cards (Season 1)	David Fincher, Joshua Donen, Eric Roth, Beau Willimon, John Melfi, Kevin Spacey, Dana Brunetti, Michael Dobbs and Andrew Davies, executive producers; Rick Cleveland, Sarah Treem and Robert Zotnowski, co-executive producers; Keith Huff and Karyn McCarthy, producers	Netflix
2013 (65th)	Mad Men (Season 6)	Matthew Weiner, Scott Hornbacher, Andre Jacquemetton, Maria Jacquemetton and Janet Leahy, executive producers; Semi Chellas, supervising producer; Jon Hamm, Blake McCormick and Erin Levy, producers	AMC
2014 (66th)
2014 (66th)	Breaking Bad (Season 5 Part 2)^{[C]}	Vince Gilligan, Mark Johnson and Michelle MacLaren, executive producers; Melissa Bernstein, Sam Catlin, Peter Gould, George Mastras, Thomas Schnauz and Moira Walley-Beckett, co-executive producers; Bryan Cranston and Diane Mercer, producers; Stewart A. Lyons, produced by	AMC
2014 (66th)	Downton Abbey (Season 4)	Gareth Neame, Julian Fellowes and Liz Trubridge, executive producers; Nigel Marchant, co-executive producer; Rupert Ryle-Hodges, producer	PBS
2014 (66th)	Game of Thrones (Season 4)	David Benioff, D. B. Weiss, Carolyn Strauss, Frank Doelger and Bernadette Caulfield, executive producers; Vince Gerardis, Guymon Casady and George R. R. Martin, co-executive producers; Chris Newman and Greg Spence, producers	HBO
2014 (66th)	House of Cards (Season 2)	Beau Willimon, Joshua Donen, Eric Roth, David Fincher, Kevin Spacey, Dana Brunetti, Andrew Davies, Michael Dobbs and David Manson, executive producers; John Mankiewicz and Robert Zotnowski, co-executive producers; Iain Paterson, produced by	Netflix
2014 (66th)	Mad Men (Season 7 Part 1)^{[D]}	Matthew Weiner, Scott Hornbacher and Janet Leahy, executive producers; Semi Chellas, co-executive producer; Erin Levy, supervising producer; Jon Hamm, Blake McCormick and Tom Smuts, producers	AMC
2014 (66th)	True Detective (Season 1)	Nic Pizzolatto, Cary Joji Fukunaga, Scott Stephens, Steve Golin, Woody Harrelson, Matthew McConaughey and Richard Brown, executive producers; Carol Cuddy, producer	HBO
2015 (67th)
2015 (67th)	Game of Thrones (Season 5)	David Benioff, D. B. Weiss, Carolyn Strauss, Frank Doelger and Bernadette Caulfield, executive producers; Vince Gerardis, Guymon Casady and George R. R. Martin, co-executive producers; Chris Newman, Greg Spence, Lisa McAtackney and Bryan Cogman, producers	HBO
2015 (67th)	Better Call Saul (Season 1)	Vince Gilligan, Peter Gould, Mark Johnson and Melissa Bernstein, executive producers; Thomas Schnauz and Stewart A. Lyons, co-executive producers; Gennifer Hutchison, supervising producer; Diane Mercer, Nina Jack and Bob Odenkirk, producers	AMC
2015 (67th)	Downton Abbey (Season 5)	Gareth Neame, Nigel Marchant, Julian Fellowes and Liz Trubridge, executive producers; Chris Croucher, producer	PBS
2015 (67th)	Homeland (Season 4)	Alex Gansa, Howard Gordon, Alexander Cary, Chip Johannessen, Lesli Linka Glatter, Meredith Stiehm, Gideon Raff, Avi Nir and Ran Telem, executive producers; Patrick Harbinson and Michael Klick, co-executive producers; Claire Danes and Lauren White, producers	Showtime
2015 (67th)	House of Cards (Season 3)	Beau Willimon, Andrew Davies, Michael Dobbs, Kevin Spacey, Dana Brunetti, Joshua Donen, Eric Roth, David Fincher and John David Coles, executive producers; John Mankiewicz and Robert Zotnowski, co-executive producers; Frank Pugliese, supervising producer; Jay Carson, producer; Karen Moore, produced by	Netflix
2015 (67th)	Mad Men (Season 7 Part 2)^{[D]}	Matthew Weiner, Scott Hornbacher and Janet Leahy, executive producers; Semi Chellas, co-executive producer; Erin Levy, supervising producer; Jon Hamm, Blake McCormick and Tom Smuts, producers	AMC
2015 (67th)	Orange Is the New Black (Season 2)	Jenji Kohan, executive producer; Mark A. Burley, Stephen Falk, Sara Hess and Lisa I. Vinnecour, co-executive producers; Tara Herrmann, producer; Neri Kyle Tannenbaum, produced by	Netflix
2016 (68th)
2016 (68th)	Game of Thrones (Season 6)	David Benioff, D. B. Weiss, Carolyn Strauss, Frank Doelger and Bernadette Caulfield, executive producers; Vince Gerardis, Guymon Casady and George R. R. Martin, co-executive producers; Bryan Cogman, supervising producer; Chris Newman, Greg Spence and Lisa McAtackney, producers	HBO
2016 (68th)	The Americans (Season 4)	Joe Weisberg, Joel Fields, Graham Yost, Darryl Frank, Justin Falvey and Chris Long, executive producers; Stephen Schiff, co-executive producer; Mary Rae Thewlis, produced by; Joshua Brand, consulting producer	FX
2016 (68th)	Better Call Saul (Season 2)	Vince Gilligan, Peter Gould, Mark Johnson, Melissa Bernstein and Thomas Schnauz, executive producers; Gennifer Hutchison, co-executive producer; Nina Jack, supervising producer; Diane Mercer and Bob Odenkirk, producers; Robin Sweet, produced by	AMC
2016 (68th)	Downton Abbey (Season 6)	Gareth Neame, Julian Fellowes, Liz Trubridge and Nigel Marchant, executive producers; Chris Croucher, producer	PBS
2016 (68th)	Homeland (Season 5)	Alex Gansa, Howard Gordon, Chip Johannessen, Lesli Linka Glatter, Meredith Stiehm, Avi Nir, Ran Telem, Gideon Raff and Patrick Harbinson, executive producers; Michael Klick, Claire Danes, Ron Nyswaner, Ted Mann and Benjamin Cavell, co-executive producers; Lauren White and Katie O'Hara, producers	Showtime
2016 (68th)	House of Cards (Season 4)	Beau Willimon, Andrew Davies, Michael Dobbs, Robin Wright, Kevin Spacey, Dana Brunetti, Joshua Donen, Eric Roth and David Fincher, executive producers; John Mankiewicz and Robert Zotnowski, co-executive producers; Jay Carson and Frank Pugliese, supervising producers; Hameed Shaukat, producer; Boris Malden, produced by	Netflix
2016 (68th)	Mr. Robot (Season 1)	Sam Esmail, Chad Hamilton and Steve Golin, executive producers; Kyle Bradstreet and David Iserson, supervising producers; Margo Myers Massey, produced by	USA
2017 (69th)
2017 (69th)	The Handmaid's Tale (Season 1)	Bruce Miller, Warren Littlefield, Daniel Wilson, Fran Sears and Ilene Chaiken, executive producers; Sheila Hockin, Eric Tuchman, Frank Siracusa and John Weber, co-executive producers; Kira Snyder, supervising producer; Elisabeth Moss, producer; Joseph Boccia, produced by; Leila Gerstein, consulting producer	Hulu
2017 (69th)	Better Call Saul (Season 3)	Vince Gilligan, Peter Gould, Mark Johnson, Melissa Bernstein, Thomas Schnauz and Gennifer Hutchison, executive producers; Nina Jack and Diane Mercer, co-executive producers; Bob Odenkirk, Jonathan Glatzer and Gordon Smith, producers; Robin Sweet, produced by	AMC
2017 (69th)	The Crown (Season 1)	Peter Morgan, Stephen Daldry, Andy Harries, Philip Martin, Suzanne Mackie, Matthew Byam-Shaw, Robert Fox and Tanya Seghatchian, executive producers; Andrew Eaton, producer	Netflix
2017 (69th)	House of Cards (Season 5)	Melissa James Gibson, Frank Pugliese, Andrew Davies, Michael Dobbs, Robin Wright, Kevin Spacey, Dana Brunetti, Joshua Donen, Eric Roth, David Fincher, Daniel Minahan and John Mankiewicz, executive producers; Robert Zotnowski, co-executive producer; Kenneth Lin and Hameed Shaukat, supervising producers; Laura Eason and Bill Kennedy, producers; Boris Malden, produced by	Netflix
2017 (69th)	Stranger Things (Season 1)	The Duffer Brothers, Dan Cohen and Shawn Levy, executive producers; Iain Paterson, co-executive producer	Netflix
2017 (69th)	This Is Us (Season 1)	Dan Fogelman, Jess Rosenthal, John Requa, Glenn Ficarra, Ken Olin, Donald Todd and Charles Gogolak, executive producers; KJ Steinberg, Isaac Aptaker, Elizabeth Berger, Joe Lawson and Steve Beers, co-executive producers; Vera Herbert and Bekah Brunstetter, producers	NBC
2017 (69th)	Westworld (Season 1)	J. J. Abrams, Jonathan Nolan, Lisa Joy and Bryan Burk, executive producers; Athena Wickham, Kathy Lingg, Richard J. Lewis, Roberto Patino and Katherine Lingenfelter, co-executive producers; Cherylanne Martin, producer	HBO
2018 (70th)
2018 (70th)	Game of Thrones (Season 7)	David Benioff, D. B. Weiss, Carolyn Strauss, Frank Doelger and Bernadette Caulfield, executive producers; George R. R. Martin, Guymon Casady, Vince Gerardis and Bryan Cogman, co-executive producers; Chris Newman, Lisa McAtackney and Greg Spence, producers	HBO
2018 (70th)	The Americans (Season 6)	Joe Weisberg, Joel Fields, Chris Long, Graham Yost, Justin Falvey, Darryl Frank, Stephen Schiff and Mary Rae Thewlis, executive producers; Tracey Scott Wilson and Peter Ackerman, co-executive producers; Joshua Brand, consulting producer	FX
2018 (70th)	The Crown (Season 2)	Peter Morgan, Stephen Daldry, Andy Harries, Philip Martin, Suzanne Mackie, Matthew Byam Shaw and Robert Fox, executive producers; Andy Stebbing and Martin Harrison, producers	Netflix
2018 (70th)	The Handmaid's Tale (Season 2)	Bruce Miller, Warren Littlefield, Elisabeth Moss, Daniel Wilson and Fran Sears, executive producers; Mike Barker, Sheila Hockin, Eric Tuchman, Kira Snyder, Yahlin Chang, Frank Siracusa and John Weber, co-executive producers; Dorothy Fortenberry, producer; Joseph Boccia, produced by; Margaret Atwood and Ron Milbauer, consulting producers	Hulu
2018 (70th)	Stranger Things (Season 2)	Iain Paterson, Shawn Levy, Dan Cohen and The Duffer Brothers, executive producers; Rand Geiger and Justin Doble, producers	Netflix
2018 (70th)	This Is Us (Season 2)	Dan Fogelman, Jess Rosenthal, Isaac Aptaker, Elizabeth Berger, John Requa, Glenn Ficarra, Ken Olin and Charles Gogolak, executive producers; KJ Steinberg, Steve Beers, Don Roos and Tyler Bensinger, co-executive producers; Vera Herbert, supervising producer; Bekah Brunstetter, Cathy Mickel Gibson and Nick Pavonetti, producers	NBC
2018 (70th)	Westworld (Season 2)	Jonathan Nolan, Lisa Joy, J. J. Abrams, Athena Wickham, Richard J. Lewis, Roberto Patino and Ben Stephenson, executive producers; Eugene Kelly, Ron Fitzgerald, Frederick E.O. Toye and Michael Polaire, co-executive producers; Carly Wray, Dan Dietz and Stephen Semel, producers; Jordan Goldberg, consulting producer	HBO
2019 (71st)
2019 (71st)	Game of Thrones (Season 8)	David Benioff, D. B. Weiss, Carolyn Strauss, Bernadette Caulfield, Frank Doelger, David Nutter and Miguel Sapochnik, executive producers; Vince Gerardis, Guymon Casady, George R. R. Martin and Bryan Cogman, co-executive producers; Chris Newman, Greg Spence, Lisa McAtackney and Duncan Muggoch, producers	HBO
2019 (71st)	Better Call Saul (Season 4)	Vince Gilligan, Peter Gould, Mark Johnson, Melissa Bernstein, Thomas Schnauz and Gennifer Hutchison, executive producers; Nina Jack and Diane Mercer, co-executive producers; Gordon Smith and Alison Tatlock, supervising producers; Ann Cherkis and Bob Odenkirk, producers; Robin Sweet, produced by	AMC
2019 (71st)	Bodyguard (Season 1)	Jed Mercurio, Simon Heath, Elizabeth Kilgarriff and Roderick Seligman, executive producers; Priscilla Parish and Eric Coulter, produced by	Netflix
2019 (71st)	Killing Eve (Season 2)	Sally Woodward Gentle, Lee Morris, Phoebe Waller-Bridge, Emerald Fennell, Gina Mingacci and Damon Thomas, executive producers; Francesca Gardiner and Sandra Oh, co-executive producers; Elinor Day, Morenike Williams and Andy Noble, produced by	BBC America
2019 (71st)	Ozark (Season 2)	Jason Bateman, Chris Mundy, Bill Dubuque, Mark Williams and David Manson, executive producers; Alyson Feltes, Ryan Farley and Patrick Markey, co-executive producers; Erin Mitchell, producer; Matthew Spiegel, produced by	Netflix
2019 (71st)	Pose (Season 1)	Ryan Murphy, Brad Falchuk, Nina Jacobson, Brad Simpson, Alexis Martin Woodall and Sherry Marsh, executive producers; Steven Canals and Silas Howard, co-executive producers; Janet Mock, Our Lady J and Lou Eyrich, producers; Erica Kay, produced by	FX
2019 (71st)	Succession (Season 1)	Jesse Armstrong, Adam McKay, Will Ferrell, Frank Rich, Kevin Messick, Mark Mylod and Jane Tranter, executive producers; Tony Roche, Lucy Prebble and Georgia Pritchett, co-executive producers; Jonathan Glatzer and Jon Brown, supervising producers; Dara Schnapper, producer; Jonathan Filley, produced by	HBO
2019 (71st)	This Is Us (Season 3)	Dan Fogelman, Jess Rosenthal, Isaac Aptaker, Elizabeth Berger, Ken Olin, John Requa, Glenn Ficarra and Charles Gogolak, executive producers; Steve Beers, KJ Steinberg, Kevin Falls and Julia Brownell, co-executive producers; Vera Herbert and Bekah Brunstetter, supervising producers; Shukree Hassan Tilghman, Nicholas Pavonetti and Cathy Mickel Gibson, producers	NBC

=== 2020s ===
Year	Program	Producers	Network
2020 (72nd)
2020 (72nd)	Succession (Season 2)	Jesse Armstrong, Adam McKay, Will Ferrell, Frank Rich, Kevin Messick, Mark Mylod, Jane Tranter, Tony Roche and Scott Ferguson, executive producers; Jon Brown and Georgia Pritchett, co-executive producers; Jonathan Glatzer, supervising producer; Will Tracy, Dara Schnapper and Gabrielle Mahon, producers; Lucy Prebble, consulting producer	HBO
2020 (72nd)	Better Call Saul (Season 5)	Peter Gould, Vince Gilligan, Mark Johnson, Melissa Bernstein and Thomas Schnauz, executive producers; Diane Mercer, Gordon Smith and Alison Tatlock, co-executive producers; Ann Cherkis, supervising producer; Bob Odenkirk, producer; Princess Nash, produced by	AMC
2020 (72nd)	The Crown (Season 3)	Peter Morgan, Suzanne Mackie, Stephen Daldry, Andy Harries, Benjamin Caron, Matthew Byam Shaw and Robert Fox, executive producers; Michael Casey, Andy Stebbing, Martin Harrison and Oona O'Beirn, producers	Netflix
2020 (72nd)	The Handmaid's Tale (Season 3)	Bruce Miller, Warren Littlefield, Elisabeth Moss, Daniel Wilson, Fran Sears, Mike Barker, Eric Tuchman, Sheila Hockin, John Weber and Frank Siracusa, executive producers; Kira Snyder, Yahlin Chang and Margaret Atwood, co-executive producers; Dorothy Fortenberry and Marissa Jo Cerar, supervising producers; Nina Fiore and John Herrera, producers; Kim Todd, produced by	Hulu
2020 (72nd)	Killing Eve (Season 3)	Sally Woodward Gentle, Lee Morris, Phoebe Waller-Bridge, Gina Mingacci, Sandra Oh, Damon Thomas, Suzanne Heathcote and Jeff Melvoin, executive producers; Lynn Horsford, co-executive producer; Nige Watson, produced by	BBC America
2020 (72nd)	The Mandalorian (Season 1)	Jon Favreau, Dave Filoni, Kathleen Kennedy and Colin Wilson, executive producers; Karen Gilchrist, co-executive producer	Disney+
2020 (72nd)	Ozark (Season 3)	Jason Bateman, Chris Mundy, Bill Dubuque, Mark Williams, Patrick Markey and John Shiban, executive producers; Miki Johnson, supervising producer; Erin Mitchell, Martin Zimmerman and Peter Thorell, producers; Matthew Spiegel, produced by	Netflix
2020 (72nd)	Stranger Things (Season 3)	Iain Paterson, Shawn Levy, Dan Cohen and The Duffer Brothers, executive producers; Curtis Gwinn, co-executive producer; Rand Geiger, producer	Netflix
2021 (73rd)
2021 (73rd)	The Crown (Season 4)	Peter Morgan, Suzanne Mackie, Stephen Daldry, Andy Harries, Benjamin Caron, Matthew Byam Shaw and Robert Fox, executive producers; Michael Casey, Andy Stebbing, Martin Harrison and Oona O'Beirn, producers	Netflix
2021 (73rd)	The Boys (Season 2)	Eric Kripke, Seth Rogen, Evan Goldberg, James Weaver, Neal H. Moritz, Pavun Shetty, Craig Rosenberg, Phil Sgriccia, Rebecca Sonnenshine, Ken F. Levin and Jason Netter, executive producers; Garth Ennis, Darick Robertson and Michael Saltzman, co-executive producers; Michaela Starr, supervising producer; Gabriel Garcia, producer; Hartley Gorenstein, produced by	Prime Video
2021 (73rd)	Bridgerton (Season 1)	Chris Van Dusen, Shonda Rhimes and Betsy Beers, executive producers; Scott Collins, Alison Eakle, Sara Fischer, Julia Quinn, Leila Cohan-Miccio, Jonathan Igla and Janet Lin, co-executive producers; Holden Chang and Sarah Dollard, producers; Sarada McDermott, produced by	Netflix
2021 (73rd)	The Handmaid's Tale (Season 4)	Bruce Miller, Warren Littlefield, Elisabeth Moss, Daniel Wilson, Fran Sears, Eric Tuchman, Sheila Hockin, John Weber, Frank Siracusa, Kira Snyder and Yahlin Chang, executive producers; Dorothy Fortenberry, Margaret Atwood, Kim Todd and Matt Hastings, co-executive producers; Nina Fiore and John Herrera, supervising producers	Hulu
2021 (73rd)	Lovecraft Country (Season 1)	Misha Green, J. J. Abrams, Jordan Peele, Bill Carraro, Yann Demange and Ben Stephenson, executive producers; Rachel Rusch Rich, Jonathan I. Kidd, Sonya Winton-Odamtten and Matt King, co-executive producers; Dana Robin, produced by	HBO
2021 (73rd)	The Mandalorian (Season 2)	Jon Favreau, Dave Filoni, Kathleen Kennedy and Colin Wilson, executive producers; Karen Gilchrist and Carrie Beck, co-executive producers; John Bartnicki, producer	Disney+
2021 (73rd)	Pose (Season 3)	Ryan Murphy, Brad Falchuk, Nina Jacobson, Brad Simpson, Alexis Martin Woodall, Sherry Marsh, Steven Canals and Janet Mock, executive producers; Our Lady J, co-executive producer; Tanase Popa, supervising producer; Lou Eyrich, Jeff Dickerson and Todd Nenninger, producers; Kip Davis Myers, produced by	FX
2021 (73rd)	This Is Us (Season 5)	John Requa, Glenn Ficarra, Charles Gogolak, Ken Olin, Isaac Aptaker, Elizabeth Berger, Dan Fogelman and Jess Rosenthal, executive producers; Kay Oyegun, Casey Johnson, David Windsor, Vera Herbert, Julia Brownell, Kevin Falls, K.J. Steinberg and Steve Beers, co-executive producers; Elan Mastai, supervising producer; Nick Pavonetti, producer; Cathy Mickel Gibson, produced by	NBC
2022 (74th)
2022 (74th)	Succession (Season 3)	Jesse Armstrong, Adam McKay, Will Ferrell, Frank Rich, Kevin Messick, Mark Mylod, Jane Tranter, Tony Roche, Scott Ferguson, Jon Brown, Lucy Prebble and Will Tracy, executive producers; Georgia Pritchett and Ted Cohen, co-executive producers; Susan Soon He Stanton and Dara Schnapper, supervising producers; Gabrielle Mahon, produced by; Francesca Gardiner, consulting producer	HBO
2022 (74th)	Better Call Saul (Season 6, Part 1)^{[E]}	Vince Gilligan, Peter Gould, Mark Johnson, Melissa Bernstein, Thomas Schnauz, Gordon Smith, Alison Tatlock, Diane Mercer and Michael Morris, executive producers; Ann Cherkis, co-executive producer; Trina Siopy, supervising producer; Bob Odenkirk and Jenn Carroll, producers; Jim Powers, produced by	AMC
2022 (74th)	Euphoria (Season 2)	Sam Levinson, Kevin Turen, Ravi Nandan, Drake, Adel "Future" Nur, Zendaya, Will Greenfield, Ashley Levinson, Hadas Mozes Lichtenstein, Ron Leshem and Tmira Yardeni, executive producers; Kenneth Yu and Harrison Kreiss, producers	HBO
2022 (74th)	Ozark (Season 4)	Jason Bateman, Chris Mundy, Bill Dubuque, Mark Williams, Patrick Markey and John Shiban, executive producers; Miki Johnson and Laura Linney, co-executive producers; Erin Mitchell and Martin Zimmerman, supervising producers; Paul Kolsby and Laura Deeley, producers; Dana Scott, produced by	Netflix
2022 (74th)	Severance (Season 1)	Ben Stiller, Nicholas Weinstock, Jackie Cohn, Mark Friedman, Dan Erickson, Andrew Colville, Chris Black and John Cameron, executive producers; Jill Footlick and Kari Drake, co-executive producers; Adam Scott, Patricia Arquette, Aoife McArdle, Amanda Overton and Gerry Robert Byrne, producers	Apple TV+
2022 (74th)	Squid Game (Season 1)	Kim Ji-yeon and Hwang Dong-hyuk, executive producers	Netflix
2022 (74th)	Stranger Things (Season 4 Part 1)	The Duffer Brothers, Dan Cohen, Shawn Levy, Curtis Gwinn and Iain Paterson, executive producers; Rand Geiger, Kate Trefry and Paul Dichter, producers; Lampton Enochs, produced by	Netflix
2022 (74th)	Yellowjackets (Season 1)	Jonathan Lisco, Ashley Lyle, Bart Nickerson, Drew Comins and Karyn Kusama, executive producers; Liz Phang, Jamie Travis, Brad Van Arragon, Sarah L. Thompson and Ameni Rozsa, co-executive producers; Chantelle M. Wells, supervising producer	Showtime
2023 (75th)
2023 (75th)	Succession (Season 4)	Jesse Armstrong, Adam McKay, Will Ferrell, Frank Rich, Kevin Messick, Mark Mylod, Jane Tranter, Tony Roche, Scott Ferguson, Jon Brown, Lucy Prebble and Will Tracy, executive producers; Dara Schnapper, Georgia Pritchett and Ted Cohen, co-executive producers; Susan Soon He Stanton, supervising producer; Gabrielle Mahon, produced by; Francesca Gardiner, consulting producer	HBO
2023 (75th)	Andor (Season 1)	Sanne Wohlenberg, Tony Gilroy, Kathleen Kennedy, Diego Luna, Toby Haynes and Michelle Rejwan, executive producers; Kate Hazell and David Meanti, producers	Disney+
2023 (75th)	Better Call Saul (Season 6, Part 2)^{[E]}	Vince Gilligan, Peter Gould, Mark Johnson, Melissa Bernstein, Thomas Schnauz, Gordon Smith, Alison Tatlock, Diane Mercer and Michael Morris, executive producers; Ann Cherkis, co-executive producer; Trina Siopy, supervising producer; Bob Odenkirk and Jenn Carroll, producers; James Powers, produced by	AMC
2023 (75th)	The Crown (Season 5)	Peter Morgan, Suzanne Mackie, Stephen Daldry, Andy Harries, Jessica Hobbs, Matthew Byam Shaw and Robert Fox, executive producers; Michael Casey, Andy Stebbing, Martin Harrison and Oona O'Beirn, producers	Netflix
2023 (75th)	House of the Dragon (Season 1)	Ryan Condal, Miguel Sapochnik, George R. R. Martin, Ron Schmidt, Jocelyn Diaz, Sara Hess and Vince Gerardis, executive producers; Greg Yaitanes and David Hancock, co-executive producers; Karen Wacker, producer; Richard Sharkey, consulting producer	HBO
2023 (75th)	The Last of Us (Season 1)	Craig Mazin, Neil Druckmann, Carolyn Strauss, Rose Lam, Asad Qizilbash, Carter Swan and Evan Wells, executive producers; Jacqueline Lesko, co-executive producer; Greg Spence, producer; Cecil O'Connor, produced by	HBO
2023 (75th)	The White Lotus (Season 2)	Mike White, David Bernad and Mark Kamine, executive producers; Heather Persons and John M. Valerio, producers	HBO
2023 (75th)	Yellowjackets (Season 2)	Jonathan Lisco, Ashley Lyle, Bart Nickerson, Drew Comins, Karyn Kusama, Sarah L. Thompson and Ameni Rozsa, executive producers; Liz Phang, Julia Bicknell and Jeff W. Byrd, co-executive producers; Tayah Geist, producer; Kathy Gilroy, produced by	Showtime
2024 (76th)
2024 (76th)	Shōgun (Season 1)	Justin Marks, Michaela Clavell, Edward L. McDonnell, Michael De Luca and Rachel Kondo, executive producers; Shannon Goss and Jamie Vega Wheeler, co-executive producers; Hiroyuki Sanada and Eriko Miyagawa, producers; Erin Smith, produced by; Matt Lambert, consulting producer	FX
2024 (76th)	The Crown (Season 6)	Peter Morgan, Suzanne Mackie, Stephen Daldry, Andy Harries, Christian Schwochow, Matthew Byam Shaw and Robert Fox, executive producers; Michael Casey, Andy Stebbing, Martin Harrison and Oona O'Beirn, producers	Netflix
2024 (76th)	Fallout (Season 1)	Jonathan Nolan, Lisa Joy, Geneva Robertson-Dworet, Graham Wagner, Athena Wickham, Todd Howard, James Altman, Margot Lulick and James W. Skotchdopole, executive producers; Stephen Semel, Karey Dornetto, Carson Mell, Kieran Fitzgerald and Jill Footlick, co-executive producers; Noreen O'Toole and Jay Worth, supervising producers; Crystal Whelan, Halle Phillips and Gursimran Sandhu, producers; Skye Wathen, produced by	Prime Video
2024 (76th)	The Gilded Age (Season 2)	Julian Fellowes, Gareth Neame, David Crockett, Michael Engler, Sonja Warfield, Salli Richardson Whitfield and Robert Greenblatt, executive producers; Erica Armstrong Dunbar, co-executive producer; Claire M. Shanley, producer; Holly Rymon, produced by	HBO
2024 (76th)	The Morning Show (Season 3)	Charlotte Stoudt, Mimi Leder, Michael Ellenberg, Reese Witherspoon, Jennifer Aniston, Kristin Hahn and Lauren Neustadter, executive producers; Joshua Allen, Zander Lehmann, Torrey Speer, David Auge and Lindsey Springer, co-executive producers; Bill Kennedy, Mallory Schwartz and Emily Ferenbach, supervising producers; Brian Stelter and John Blair, producers; Ronald Cosmo Vecchiarelli, produced by	Apple TV+
2024 (76th)	Mr. & Mrs. Smith (Season 1)	Donald Glover, Francesca Sloane, Stephen Glover, Hiro Murai, Nate Matteson, Anthony Katagas, Arnon Milchan, Yariv Milchan and Michael Schaefer, executive producers; Carla Ching, co-executive producer; Christian Sprenger, Fam Udeorji and Kaitlin Waldron, producers	Prime Video
2024 (76th)	Slow Horses (Season 3)	Graham Yost, Will Smith, Douglas Urbanski, Gail Mutrux, Iain Canning, Emile Sherman, Jane Robertson, Jamie Laurenson and Hakan Kousetta, executive producers; Julian Stevens and Simon Gillis, co-executive producers	Apple TV+
2024 (76th)	3 Body Problem (Season 1)	D. B. Weiss, David Benioff, Alexander Woo, Bernadette Caulfield, Nena Rodrigue, Ram Bergman, Rian Johnson, Dede Gardner, Jeremy Kleiner, Brad Pitt, Xiaosong Gao, Lauren Ma, Jilong Zhao, Qi Lin, Robie Uniacke and Rosamund Pike, executive producers; Duncan Muggoch, Andrew Stanton and Derek Tsang, co-executive producers; Hameed Shaukat and Steve Kullback, producers	Netflix
2025 (77th)
2025 (77th)	The Pitt (Season 1)	R. Scott Gemmill, John Wells, Noah Wyle, Michael Hissrich, Erin Jontow and Simran Baidwan, executive producers; Joe Sachs, Terri Murphy, Amanda Marsalis and Damian Marcano, co-executive producers; Cynthia Adarkwa, producer; Michelle Lankwarden, produced by	HBO Max
2025 (77th)	Andor (Season 2)	Sanne Wohlenberg, Tony Gilroy, Kathleen Kennedy, Diego Luna, Luke Hull and John Gilroy, executive producers; David Meanti, producer	Disney+
2025 (77th)	The Diplomat (Season 2)	Debora Cahn, Janice Williams, Keri Russell, Alex Graves and Peter Noah, executive producers; Peter Ackerman, co-executive producer; Brad Carpenter and Chris Arruda, producers; Pam Roberts, produced by	Netflix
2025 (77th)	The Last of Us (Season 2)	Craig Mazin, Neil Druckmann, Carolyn Strauss, Jacqueline Lesko, Cecil O'Connor, Asad Qizilbash, Carter Swan and Evan Wells, executive producers; Halley Gross, co-executive producer; Allen Marshall Palmer, producer; Julie Herrin, produced by	HBO
2025 (77th)	Paradise (Season 1)	Dan Fogelman, Jess Rosenthal, John Hoberg, Sterling K. Brown, Steve Beers, Glenn Ficarra and John Requa, executive producers; Gina Lucita Monreal, Jason Wilborn and Scott Weinger, co-executive producers; Chris Nguyen-Gia, producer	Hulu
2025 (77th)	Severance (Season 2)	Ben Stiller, Jackie Cohn, John Lesher, Richard Schwartz, Nicholas Weinstock, Mark Friedman, Dan Erickson, Beau Willimon, Jordan Tappis, Sam Donovan, Caroline Baron, Adam Scott and Patricia Arquette, executive producers; Mohamad El Masri and Adam Countee, co-executive producers; Anna Ouyang Moench, supervising producer; Jessica Lee Gagné and Wei-Ning Yu, producers; Sean Fogel, produced by; Erin Wagoner and K.C. Perry, consulting producers	Apple TV
2025 (77th)	Slow Horses (Season 4)	Jamie Laurenson, Hakan Kousetta, Iain Canning, Emile Sherman, Jane Robertson, Julian Stevens, Douglas Urbanski, Gail Mutrux, Will Smith and Graham Yost, executive producers; Simon Gillis, co-executive producer	Apple TV
2025 (77th)	The White Lotus (Season 3)	Mike White, David Bernad and Mark Kamine, executive producers; Nicholas Simon, co-executive producer; John M. Valerio and Todd Brown, producers	HBO
2026 (78th)
2026 (78th)	The Pitt (Season 2)	R. Scott Gemmill, John Wells, Noah Wyle, Michael Hissrich, Erin Jontow, Simran Baidwan and Joe Sachs, executive producers; Terri Murphy, Damian Marcano and Uta Briesewitz, co-executive producers; Cynthia Adarkwa, supervising producer; Michelle Lankwarden, produced by	HBO Max
2026 (78th)	The Diplomat (Season 3)	Debora Cahn, Janice Williams, Keri Russell, Alex Graves, Peter Noah and Eli Attie, executive producers; Peter Ackerman and Jessica Brickman, co-executive producers; Pam Roberts and Brad Carpenter, producers; Melissa Gelernter, produced by	Netflix
2026 (78th)	The Gilded Age (Season 3)	Julian Fellowes, Gareth Neame, David Crockett, Michael Engler, Sonja Warfield, Salli Richardson-Whitfield and Robert Greenblatt, executive producers; Erica Armstrong Dunbar, co-executive producer; Claire M. Shanley and Luke Harlan, producers; Holly Rymon, produced by	HBO
2026 (78th)	A Knight of the Seven Kingdoms (Season 1)	Ira Parker, George R. R. Martin, Sarah Bradshaw, Ryan Condal, Owen Harris and Vince Gerardis, executive producers; Aziza Barnes, Hiram Martinez, Annie Julia Wyman and Sarah Adina Smith, co-executive producers; Layla Blackman, producer; Lisa Byrne, produced by	HBO
2026 (78th)	Paradise (Season 2)	Dan Fogelman, Jess Rosenthal, John Hoberg, Sterling K. Brown, Steve Beers, Glenn Ficarra and John Requa, executive producers; Jason Wilborn, Scott Weinger and Melissa Glenn, co-executive producers; Chris Nguyen-Gia, producer; Randol Perelman-Taylor, produced by	Hulu
2026 (78th)	Pluribus (Season 1)	Vince Gilligan, Jeff Frost, Gordon Smith, Alison Tatlock and Diane Mercer, executive producers; Jenn Carroll and Trina Siopy, co-executive producers; Julie Hartley, producer; Chris Smirnoff, produced by	Apple TV
2026 (78th)	Slow Horses (Season 5)	Will Smith, Jamie Laurenson, Hakan Kousetta, Julian Stevens, Iain Canning, Emile Sherman, Douglas Urbanski, Gail Mutrux and Graham Yost, executive producers; Simon Gillis, co-executive producer	Apple TV
2026 (78th)	Your Friends & Neighbors (Season 2)	Jonathan Tropper, Craig Gillespie, Stephanie Laing, Lori Keith Douglas, Jamie Rosengard, Jon Hamm and Connie Tavel, executive producers; Chris Arruda, producer	Apple TV

== Programs with multiple wins ==
4 wins

- Game of Thrones (2 consecutive, twice)
- Hill Street Blues (consecutive)
- L.A. Law (3 consecutive)
- Mad Men (consecutive)
- The West Wing (consecutive)

3 wins

- The Defenders (consecutive)
- Dragnet (consecutive)
- Playhouse 90 (consecutive)
- Succession (2 consecutive)
- Upstairs, Downstairs (2 consecutive)

2 wins

- Breaking Bad (consecutive)
- Cagney & Lacey (consecutive)
- Lou Grant (consecutive)
- Mission: Impossible (consecutive)
- Picket Fences (consecutive)
- The Pitt (consecutive)
- The Practice (consecutive)
- The Sopranos
- The United States Steel Hour (consecutive)

== Producers with multiple wins ==
7 wins

- Steven Bochco
- David E. Kelley

6 wins

- Robert Breech
- Gregory Hoblit
- Matthew Weiner
- John Wells
- Alice West

4 wins

- David Benioff
- Guymon Casady
- Bernadette Caulfield
- Bryan Cogman
- Frank Doelger
- Vince Gerardis
- Kristin Harms
- Michael Hissrich
- Scott Hornbacher
- George R. R. Martin
- Lisa McAtackney
- Chris Newman
- Thomas Schlamme
- Aaron Sorkin
- Greg Spence
- Carolyn Strauss
- D. B. Weiss
- Llewellyn Wells

3 wins

- Lisa Albert
- Jesse Armstrong
- Jon Brown
- David Chase
- Kevin Falls
- Scott Ferguson
- Will Ferrell
- John Hawkesworth
- Andre Jacquemetton
- Maria Jacquemetton
- Gabrielle Mahon
- Adam McKay
- Kevin Messick
- Mark Mylod
- Jonathan Pontell
- Lucy Prebble
- Georgia Pritchett
- Frank Rich
- Tony Roche
- Dara Schnapper
- Will Tracy
- Jane Tranter
- Rick Wallace

2 wins

- David Anspaugh
- Melissa Bernstein
- Scott Brazil
- Henry Bronchtein
- Steve Brown
- Martin Bruestle
- Sam Catlin
- Ted Cohen
- Bryan Cranston
- William M. Finkelstein
- Rex Firkin
- Terry Louise Fisher
- Seth Freeman
- Diane Frolov
- David Fury
- Joseph Gantman
- Francesca Gardiner
- Vince Gilligan
- Phillip M. Goldfarb
- Scott Goldstein
- Howard Gordon
- Peter Gould
- Alex Graves
- Patricia Green
- Brad Grey
- Mark Johnson
- Elodie Keene
- Michael Klick
- Jeffrey Kramer
- Ilene S. Landress
- Stewart A. Lyons
- Michelle MacLaren
- George Mastras
- Blake McCormick
- Diane Mercer
- Christopher Misiano
- Christina Musrey
- Michael Pressman
- Gene Reynolds
- Michael M. Robin
- Barney Rosenzweig
- Thomas Schnauz
- Andrew Schneider
- Dwayne Shattuck
- Susan Soon He Stanton
- Gardner Stern
- Gary Strangis
- Moira Walley-Beckett
- Terence Winter
- Pamela Wisne
- Noah Wyle
- Anthony Yerkovich

== Programs with multiple nominations ==
11 nominations

- Law & Order (NBC)

8 nominations

- Game of Thrones (HBO)
- Mad Men (AMC)

7 nominations

- Better Call Saul (AMC)
- ER (NBC)
- The Sopranos (HBO)
- Studio One (CBS)
- The West Wing (NBC)

6 nominations

- The Crown (Netflix)
- Hill Street Blues (NBC)
- L.A. Law (NBC)
- NYPD Blue (ABC)
- St. Elsewhere (NBC)

5 nominations

- 24 (Fox)
- Breaking Bad (AMC)
- Downton Abbey (PBS)
- Cagney & Lacey (CBS)
- Columbo (NBC)
- House of Cards (Netflix)
- Lou Grant (CBS)

4 nominations

- Alfred Hitchcock Presents (CBS)
- Dexter (Showtime)
- Dragnet (NBC)
- The Handmaid's Tale (Hulu)
- Homeland (Showtime)
- House (Fox)
- Lost (ABC)
- Northern Exposure (CBS)
- The Philco-Goodyear Television Playhouse (NBC)
- The Practice (ABC)
- Stranger Things (Netflix)
- Succession (HBO)
- Thirtysomething (ABC)
- This Is Us (NBC)
- The X-Files (Fox)

3 nominations

- Chicago Hope (CBS)
- China Beach (ABC)
- Climax! (CBS)
- CSI: Crime Scene Investigation (CBS)
- The Defenders (CBS)
- Fame (NBC/Syndicated)
- Family (ABC)
- Foreign Intrigue (Syndicated)
- Gunsmoke (CBS)
- I Spy (NBC)
- Ironside (NBC)
- Magnum, P.I. (CBS)
- Marcus Welby, M.D. (ABC)
- Mission: Impossible (CBS)
- Murder, She Wrote (CBS)
- Naked City (ABC)
- Ozark (Netflix)
- Playhouse 90 (CBS)
- Police Story (NBC)
- Quantum Leap (NBC)
- Robert Montgomery Presents (NBC)
- The Rockford Files (NBC)
- Six Feet Under (HBO)
- Slow Horses (Apple TV+)
- The Streets of San Francisco (ABC)
- The United States Steel Hour (ABC/CBS)
- Upstairs, Downstairs (PBS)
- The Waltons (CBS)

2 nominations

- The Americans (FX)
- Andor (Disney+)
- The Avengers (ABC)
- Baretta (ABC)
- Beauty and the Beast (CBS)
- Boardwalk Empire (HBO)
- Boston Legal (ABC)
- Celanese Theatre (ABC)
- Dallas (CBS)
- Damages (FX)
- The Dick Powell Show (NBC)
- The Diplomat (Netflix)
- The Gilded Age (HBO)
- The Good Wife (CBS)
- Grey's Anatomy (ABC)
- I'll Fly Away (NBC)
- Killing Eve (BBC America)
- Kojak (CBS)
- Kraft Television Theatre (NBC)
- The Last of Us (HBO)
- The Mandalorian (Disney+)
- Maverick (ABC)
- Moonlighting (ABC)
- Paradise (Hulu)
- Picket Fences (CBS)
- The Pitt (HBO Max)
- Pose (FX)
- Pulitzer Prize Playhouse (ABC)
- Quincy, M.E. (NBC)
- Racket Squad (CBS)
- Severance (Apple TV+)
- Star Trek (NBC)
- The Untouchables (ABC)
- Wagon Train (NBC)
- Westworld (HBO)
- The White Lotus (HBO)
- The White Shadow (CBS)
- Yellowjackets (Showtime)

== Producers with multiple nominations ==
4 nominations

- Douglas Benton
- Bruce Geller
- John Mankiewicz
- David Victor

3 nominations

- Albert Aley
- Cy Chermak
- Morton Fine
- Richard Irving
- David J. O'Connell
- Joel Rogosin
- George Schaefer
- Jo Swerling Jr.

2 nominations

- Curtis W. Davis
- Leonard Freeman
- David Friedkin
- Joseph Gantman
- Harold Gast
- Winston Miller
- Gene Roddenberry
- Donald Wilson

== Total awards by network ==
- NBC – 21
- CBS – 18
- HBO/HBO Max - 11
- ABC – 9
- AMC – 6
- PBS – 4
- Fox – 1
- FX – 1
- Hulu – 1
- KECA-TV – 1
- NET – 1
- Showtime – 1
- Netflix – 1

== Notes ==
- A : While Law & Order is primarily a procedural, its Emmy-winning seventh season had a three-episode arc, while the episode "Entrapment" was a sequel to season 3's "Conspiracy" .
- B : The sixth season of The Sopranos was split into two parts. They are both considered season 6.
- C : The fifth season of Breaking Bad was split into two parts. They are both considered season 5.
- D : The seventh season of Mad Men was split into two parts. They are both considered season 7.
- E : The sixth season of Better Call Saul was split into two parts. They are both considered season 6.

== See also ==
- Primetime Emmy Award for Outstanding Comedy Series
- Golden Globe Award for Best Television Series – Drama
- Screen Actors Guild Award for Outstanding Performance by an Ensemble in a Drama Series
- Critics' Choice Television Award for Best Drama Series
