= Procedural drama =

Genre of television programming

A procedural drama or procedural is a cross-genre type of literature, film, or television program that places emphasis on technical detail. A documentary film may also be written in a procedural style to heighten narrative. A popular subgenre is the police procedural. Some dramas include a lab or high-tech conference room where the main characters meet to work out the problem. Television shows usually have an episodic TV format that does not necessarily require the viewer to have seen previous episodes. Each episode typically has a self-contained, stand-alone plot that is introduced, developed, and resolved in one episode.

The procedural format is popular around the world. In 2011, the director of a TV consultancy said, "The continuing trend is for procedurals because they use a predictable structure". Due to their stand-alone episodic nature, they are more accessible to new viewers than serials. Self-contained episodes also make it easier for viewers to return to a show if they have missed some episodes. In general, procedural dramas can usually be re-run with little concern for episode order. Procedurals are often criticized for being formulaic. Procedurals are also generally less character-driven than serialized shows; however, some procedurals have more character emphasis than is typical of the format. Some may occasionally feature a storyline stretching over several episodes (often called a story arc).

== Types of media ==
=== Television ===
==== Fiction ====
The priority, therefore, is for some central character or group of characters around whom incidents can be created week after week after week. Marcus Welby, M.D., the most successful show on American television in 1970-1, fitted this bill perfectly. Dr Welby is a general practitioner and the trials and tribulations of his patients revolve around him. "The concept is very simple," said Dick O'Connell, co-producer with David Victor, "Dr Welby is a nice man. He is presented with a problem each week and he accomplishes it. The general practitioner is the ideal format." So, too, are policemen, lawyers, surgeons and cowboys.

In television, "procedural" specifically refers to a genre of programs in which a problem is introduced, investigated, and solved all within the same episode. These shows tend to be hour-long dramas and are often (though not always) police or crime-related. The general formula for a police procedural involves the commission or discovery of a crime at the beginning of the episode, the ensuing investigation, and the arrest or conviction of a perpetrator at the end of the episode. Modern examples of this genre are the Law & Order, CSI & NCIS franchises. House is an example of a non-crime-related procedural.

- Procedural dramas are generally very popular in broadcast syndication because the lack of long-term storylines makes it easier for viewers to tune in for just one episode without feeling lost.
- Procedurals are sometimes noted for their lack of character development, with little attention being paid to the lives of the recurring characters outside of their jobs.

==== Non-fiction ====
- Non-fiction science procedurals such as the PBS Secrets of the Dead series and Court TV's Forensic Files take a viewer step-by-step through an investigation, much like a fictional procedural.

=== Film ===
There are examples of movie procedurals, such as The Void (2001). Another is the film The Dam Busters, 1955, which was called a war procedural by Richard Gilliam in Allmovie.

=== Literature ===
- Police procedural: the best-known variety, a large subgenre of mystery fiction. Lawrence Treat's 1945 novel V as in Victim is cited as perhaps the first "true" police procedural.
- Military procedural: a term used by Publishers Weekly in 1989, referring to Ralph Peters' novel Red Army

== Television examples ==
- 9-1-1 (2018–present)
- 9-1-1 Lone Star (2020–2025)
- Adam-12 (1968–1975)
- Alert: Missing Persons Unit (2023–2025)
- Battle Creek (2015)
- Bosch (2014–2021)
- Bosch: Legacy (2022–2025)
- Beauty & the Beast (2012–2016)
- Blindspot (2015–2020)
- Bull (2016–2022)
- Blue Bloods (2010–2024)
- Body of Proof (2011–2013)
- Bones (2005–2017)
- Castle (2009–2016)
- Charlie's Angels (1976–1981)
- Chicago Fire (2012–present)
- Chicago Med (2015–present)
- Chicago P.D. (2014–present)
- Chicago Justice (2017)
- The Closer (2005–2012)
- Cold Case (2003–2010)
- Columbo (1968–1978; 1989–2003)
- Common Law (2012)
- Conviction (2006)
- Criminal Minds (2005–2020; 2022–present)
- Criminal Minds: Beyond Borders (2016–2017)
- Criminal Minds: Suspect Behavior (2011)
- CSI: Crime Scene Investigation (2000–2015)
- CSI: Cyber (2015–2016)
- CSI: Miami (2002–2012)
- CSI: NY (2004–2013)
- CSI: Vegas (2021–2024)
- Deadline (2000–2001)
- Dragnet (1951–1959; 1967–1970)
- Elementary (2012–2019)
- Elsbeth (2024–present)
- Emergency! (1972–1979)
- The Equalizer (2021–2025)
- FBI (2018–present)
- FBI: Most Wanted (2020–2025)
- FBI: International (2021–2025)
- Fire Country (2022–present)
- Found (2023–2025)
- The Good Doctor (2017–2024)
- Hawaii Five-O (1968–1980)
- Hawaii Five-0 (2010–2020)
- Homicide: Life on the Street (1993–1999)
- House (2004–2012; medical procedural drama)
- Hill Street Blues (1981–1987)
- In Plain Sight (2008–2012)
- Instinct (2018–2019)
- In the Heat of the Night (1988–1995)
- Ironside (1967–1975)
- iZombie (2015–2019)
- JAG (1995–2005)
- Jo (2013)
- Law & Order (1990–2010; 2022–present)
- Law & Order: Special Victims Unit (1999–present)
- Law & Order: Organized Crime (2021–present)
- Law & Order: Criminal Intent (2001–2011)
- Law & Order: Trial by Jury (2005–2006)
- Law & Order: UK (2009–2014)
- Law & Order: LA (2010–2011)
- Law & Order Toronto: Criminal Intent (2024–present)
- Lie to Me (2009–2011)
- Lucifer (2016–2021)
- Major Crimes (2012–2018)
- Matlock (1986–1995)
- Miami Vice (1984–1990)
- Midsomer Murders (1997–present)
- McCallum (1995–1998)
- The Mentalist (2008–2015)
- Monk (2002–2009)
- Murder, She Wrote (1984–1996)
- Naked City (1958–1963)
- Nash Bridges (1996–2001)
- NCIS (2003–present)
- NCIS: Los Angeles (2009–2023)
- NCIS: New Orleans (2014–2021)
- NCIS: Hawaiʻi (2021–2024)
- NCIS: Sydney (2023–present)
- New Tricks (2003–2015)
- New York Undercover (1994–1998)
- Numb3rs (2005–2010)
- NYPD Blue (1993–2005)
- Perception (2012–2015)
- Perry Mason (1957–1966)
- Person of Interest (2011–2016)
- The Practice (1997–2004)
- Prodigal Son (2019–2021)
- Psych (2006–2014)
- Quincy, M.E. (1976–1983)
- Rebus (2000–2007)
- Rizzoli & Isles (2010–2016)
- The Rookie (2018–present)
- The Rookie: Feds (2022–2023)
- Silent Witness (1996–present)
- So Help Me Todd (2022–2024)
- Southland (2009–2013)
- Suits (2011–2019)
- S.W.A.T. (2017–2025)
- Taggart (1983–2010)
- Taxi Brooklyn (2014)
- Third Watch (1999–2005)
- The Unit (2006–2009)
- White Collar (2009−2014)
- Without a Trace (2002–2009)
- Wild Cards (2024–present)
- Will Trent (2023–present)

== See also ==
- Crime fiction
- Hard science fiction
- Legal drama
- Murder mystery
- Police procedural
- Serial (literature)
- Serial (radio and television)
