= Joseph Gantman =

American television producer

- Born: Joseph E. Gantman; April 5, 1922; Santa Ana, California, U.S.
- Died: December 26, 2017 (aged 95); Santa Monica, California, U.S.
- Occupation: Television producer
- Children: 3

Joseph E. Gantman (April 5, 1922 – December 26, 2017) was an American television producer. He produced television programs including Hawaii Five-O, Mission: Impossible, Movin' On, The Dukes of Hazzard, Young Dr. Kildare and Voyage to the Bottom of the Sea.

In 1967 and 1968 Gantman won Primetime Emmy Awards in the category Outstanding Drama Series for the series Mission: Impossible He died in December 2017 in Santa Monica, California, at the age of 95.
