= David Victor (screenwriter) =

Russian-born American producer and screenwriter

- Born: David Vikodetz; August 22, 1910; Odessa, Russian Empire
- Died: October 18, 1989 (aged 79); Virginia, U.S.
- Occupations: Producer, screenwriter
- Spouse: Florence Victor
- Children: 2

David Vikodetz (August 22, 1910 – October 18, 1989) was a Russian-born American producer and screenwriter. He won a Primetime Emmy Award and was nominated for four more in the categories Outstanding Drama Series and Outstanding Single Program for his work on the television programs The Name of the Game, Marcus Welby, M.D. and also the television film Vanished.

Victor died on October 18, 1989, of a heart attack in Virginia, at the age of 79.
