= Lou Grant season 1 =

Lou Grant
- Season 1
- No. of episodes: 22

Release
- Original network: CBS
- Original release: September 20, 1977 – March 20, 1978

Season chronology
- Next → Season 2

This is a list of episodes for the first season of Lou Grant.

== Episodes ==
No. overall	No. in season	Title	Directed by	Written by	Original release date	Prod. code
1	1	"Cophouse"	Gene Reynolds	Leon Tokatyan	September 20, 1977	7501
Lou Grant is hired as an editor for the Los Angeles Tribune and gets involved with an allegation that the police reporter for the paper is covering up a scandal.
2	2	"Hostages"	Charles Dubin	Seth Freeman	September 27, 1977	7510
A gunman (John Rubinstein) takes hostages in the newsroom after reading about how his brother was supposedly killed during a robbery.
3	3	"Hoax"	Jay Sandrich	Gordon Dawson	October 4, 1977	7503
A maverick journalist, Jack Riley, (Eugene Roche) gives Lou a tip regarding the disappearance of a rich Angelo. Note: Final appearance of Rebecca Balding as Carla Mardigian. The character Jack Riley appears again in the second season episode 'Convention' but played by Kenneth McMillan.
4	4	"Henhouse"	Richard Crenna	Leonora Thuna	October 11, 1977	7509
Lou gets into a turf war with the editor of the "women's section" (Claudette Nevins) over a story. Note: First appearance of Linda Kelsey as Billie Newman
5	5	"Nazi"	Alexander Singer	Robert Schlitt	October 18, 1977	7505
Billie discovers the subject of her story about a neo-Nazi (Peter Weller) is an Orthodox Jew. Brian Dennehy plays another neo-Nazi.
6	6	"Aftershock"	Jud Taylor	Del Reisman	October 25, 1977	7506
In addition to dealing with an earthquake, Lou has the widow (Joyce Van Patten) of a deceased reporter constantly depending on him, all while the Tribune does a story about a man (Clyde Kusatsu) claiming his insects can predict earthquakes.
7	7	"Barrio"	Mel Damski	Seth Freeman	November 1, 1977	7504
Billie is assigned to do a story about the shooting of a young mother and discovers rival gangs on the east side of Los Angeles, which leads to her involvement with a teenager facing the consequences of being a gang member.
8	8	"Scoop"	Harry Falk	Gene Kearney	November 8, 1977	7502
Billie tries to get a bigger story out of a kidnapping, while Rossi discovers something that could be big as well when he's sent to report an unimportant photo opportunity.
9	9	"Judge"	Irving Moore	Leon Tokatyan	November 15, 1977	7508
Lou is held in contempt of court when he goes to confirm a judge (Barnard Hughes)'s erratic behavior.
10	10	"Psych-Out"	Alexander Singer	Seth Freeman	November 22, 1977	7515
Rossi checks into a mental hospital after Lou encourages him to get more involved in the stories he finds, but getting out will not be easy. Sandy Martin plays a Psych-tech, Larry Hankin plays his second role in the series as a hospital patient. Reflecting the high profile of All the President's Men, Rossi uses the fake name Carl Woodward when checking into the mental hospital.
11	11	"Housewarming"	Mel Damski	Leonora Thuna	November 29, 1977	7512
While Lou holds a housewarming party, Rossi goes on a ride-along with the police that leads to a battered wife (Julie Kavner) and Billie finds another batterer (Edward Winter) close to home.
12	12	"Takeover"	Gene Reynolds	Leon Tokatyan	December 6, 1977	7513
A media mogul (John Anderson) tries to persuade Mrs. Pynchon to sell the Tribune, but Lou and Charlie have their suspicions.
13	13	"Christmas"	James Burrows	David Lloyd	December 13, 1977	7507
The public sends a lot of money to the Tribune at Christmastime thanks to Billie's story about a homeless family. Rossi, given a routine story about a DMV bureaucrat (Tim O'Connor) as a punishment, finds something much more interesting.
14	14	"Airliner"	Mel Damski	Charles Einstein	January 3, 1978	7514
The Tribune prepares for a big story as a plane bound for Los Angeles faces potential catastrophe, which gets personal upon the revelation of a connection between someone in the city room and one of the endangered airline passengers.
15	15	"Sports"	Harvey Laidman	Bud Freeman	January 10, 1978	7516
Lou is accused of personal criticism due to the city room's aggressive coverage by the athletic department of a local college.
16	16	"Hero"	Mel Damski	Seth Freeman	January 17, 1978	7518
The Tribune identifies the man who thwarted an assassination attempt on a judge, but the alleged hero turns out to be an ex-offender who never told anyone about his past.
17	17	"Renewal"	Gene Reynolds	Ken Travey	January 30, 1978	7511
An urban renewal project in the ghetto could destroy the murals an old man (Robert Earl Jones) painted by which to remember his deceased wife.
18	18	"Sect"	Alexander Singer	Michele Gallery	February 6, 1978	7517
Charlie and Marian (Peggy McCay) consider taking extreme measures to reverse their son's conversion into Hare Krishna.
19	19	"Scandal"	Mel Damski	Seth Freeman	February 13, 1978	7520
Rossi is replaced in the covering of a political campaign by a new reporter (Gail Strickland), who's involved in a nursing-home scandal with the politician (James Olson).
20	20	"Spies"	Charles Dubin	Leon Tokatyan	February 27, 1978	7519
The editors of the city room suspect someone of being a paid informant for the CIA.
21	21	"Poison"	Gene Reynolds	Michele Gallery	March 6, 1978	7521
Rossi continues an investigation started by a friend of his (Guy Boyd) involving the safety of the nuclear power industry.
22	22	"Physical"	Charles Dubin	David Lloyd	March 20, 1978	7522
A routine medical exam reveals that Lou has a serious condition which requires immediate surgery.

== Ratings ==
The show ranked 41st out of 104 shows airing during the 1977-78 season, with an average 18.7 rating.
