= David J. O'Connell (producer) =

American editor, producer and production manager

- Born: August 21, 1916; Brightwaters, New York, U.S.
- Died: January 16, 1996 (aged 79); Santa Monica, California, U.S.
- Occupations: Editor, producer, production manager
- Spouse: Jean O'Connell
- Children: 2

David J. O'Connell (August 21, 1916 – January 16, 1996) was an American editor, producer and production manager. He won a Primetime Emmy Award and was nominated for three more in the categories Outstanding Drama Series and Outstanding Single Program for his work on the television program Marcus Welby, M.D. and also the television film Vanished.

O'Connell died in January 1996 of a lung disease and emphysema in Santa Monica, California, at the age of 79.
