= Lou Grant season 4 =

Lou Grant
- Season 4
- No. of episodes: 20

Release
- Original network: CBS
- Original release: September 22, 1980 – May 4, 1981

Season chronology
- ← Previous; Season 3 Next → Season 5

This is a list of episodes for the fourth season of Lou Grant.

== Episodes ==
No. overall	No. in season	Title	Directed by	Written by	Original release date	Prod. code
71	1	"Nightside"	Gene Reynolds	Michele Gallery	September 22, 1980	0504
While taking his turn on the night shift, Lou sees an article about a wrecked yacht and sends Rossi and Billie to investigate. David Paymer plays Roy, a night reporter.
72	2	"Harassment"	Roger Young	April Smith	September 29, 1980	0501
Lou gives Billie permission to do a story on sexual harassment at a big company and is shocked at the company she's chosen to expose.
73	3	"Pack"	Burt Brinckerhoff	Steve Kline	October 27, 1980	0502
Billie follows a senate candidate and struggles to deal with the pack mentality of the other journalists. Lou meets up with his old friend, Flo (Eileen Heckart). John Hillerman plays a New York Times reporter; Joe Regalbuto plays the press secretary to the senate candidate.
74	4	"Sting"	Peter Levin	Patt Shea & Harriet Weiss	November 17, 1980	0503
Charlie and Marian rent out their house to get a taste of living in an urban apartment, but the renter's (Larry Linville) unorthodox uses of the house surprises Charlie when the Tribune investigates.
75	5	"Goop"	Alexander Singer	Seth Freeman	November 24, 1980	0507
Rossi and Billie reluctantly agree that Billie must go undercover as an employee of a chemical company to get the scoop on their illegal dumping. Dominique Dunne plays a co-worker.
76	6	"Libel"	Burt Brinckerhoff	William Hopkins	December 8, 1980	0506
A supermarket tabloid sues the Tribune for libel.
77	7	"Streets"	Donald A. Baer	Bud Freeman	December 15, 1980	0505
Rossi clashes with a black reporter as they investigate a murder in the ghetto, while the Tribune comes up with a new section to make them more appealing.
78	8	"Catch"	Roger Young	Michele Gallery	January 5, 1981	0511
Billie gets close to baseball player Ted McCovey during her investigation of a financial scandal and the Tribune deals with computer troubles.
79	9	"Rape"	Seth Freeman	Seth Freeman	January 12, 1981	0516
A reporter (Lynne Moody) for the Tribune is robbed and raped in her own home. Jonathan Banks plays the rapist; Kurtwood Smith plays a policeman; Julia Duffy plays a fast-food server.
80	10	"Boomerang"	Alexander Singer	Steve Kline	January 19, 1981	0512
Rossi and Billie investigate the exporting of illegal goods in America and instead of taking Lou's advice on how to handle the story, they side with a visiting star reporter. Meshach Taylor plays Kinsasha, a member of an African trade delegation.
81	11	"Generations"	Harvey Laidman	Johnny Dawkins	January 26, 1981	0514
Charlie and Marian struggle to deal with Charlie's father when he moves in with him, while Lou tries to help an elderly neighbor being picked on by teenagers (one played by Matthew Broderick).
82	12	"Search"	Allen Williams	Everett Greenbaum & Elliott Reid	February 9, 1981	0515
Rossi assists an adopted photographer (Alley Mills) for the Tribune on a search for her birth parents, while Lou finds it difficult to enjoy his favorite restaurant after Corrine writes a review about it.
83	13	"Strike"	Gene Reynolds	April Smith	February 16, 1981	0510
The editorial staff of the Tribune goes on strike. Ray Wise plays a consultant for management.
84	14	"Survival"	Burt Brinckerhoff	April Smith	February 23, 1981	0517
Rossi's investigation of survivalists (led by Ed Harris) gets him and Lou stranded in the forest during a rainstorm.
85	15	"Venice"	Paul Stanley	Patt Shea & Harriet Weiss	March 9, 1981	0509
Animal struggles to understand a woman's suicide at Venice Beach. Trinidad Silva, another future Hill Street Blues regular, plays a friendly gang leader.
86	16	"Campesinos"	Peter Levin	Michael Vittes	March 16, 1981	0513
Rossi does a report on a migrant workers' strike in Central Valley.
87	17	"Business"	Alan Cooke	Steve Kline	March 23, 1981	0518
The Tribune's investigation of a company's dishonesty leads to bad publicity with investors. Kenneth Tigar plays a TV interviewer.
88	18	"Violence"	Georg Stanford Brown	Johnny Dawkins	April 6, 1981	0519
Rossi and Billie do a story about a brutal football player (played by Fred Williamson) and the man he crippled, while Lou disagrees with a film critic (Tyne Daly) over the use of violence in movies. Fred Dryer plays a teammate.
89	19	"Depression"	Peter Levin	Gene Reynolds	April 13, 1981	0508
Lou tries to help when a depressed Tribune reporter attempts suicide.
90	20	"Stroke"	Roger Young	April Smith	May 4, 1981	0520
Mrs. Pynchon has a stroke, leading her nephews to try taking over the paper.
