= Lou Grant season 3 =

Lou Grant
- Season 3
- No. of episodes: 24

Release
- Original network: CBS
- Original release: September 17, 1979 – March 24, 1980

Season chronology
- ← Previous; Season 2 Next → Season 4

This is a list of episodes for the third season of Lou Grant.

== Episodes ==
No. overall	No. in season	Title	Directed by	Written by	Original release date	Prod. code
47	1	"Cop"	Roger Young	Seth Freeman	September 17, 1979	9504
Lou becomes suspicious when a patrol officer is assigned to investigate a murder that's happened on Lou's block, while the Tribune faces the ethics of naming five people who were killed in a fire at a gay bar.
48	2	"Expose"	Gene Reynolds	David Lloyd	September 24, 1979	9506
The Tribune's coverage of a politician's marriage problems with a rogue husband (William Schallert) is called into question when a magazine does a story about the Tribune newsroom. Ed Asner replaced William Schallert as President of the Screen Actors Guild in 1981.
49	3	"Slammer"	Alexander Singer	Johnny Dawkins	October 1, 1979	9501
Lou becomes an advisor to a group of prisoners trying to do a newspaper in the prison, while Mrs. Pynchon is called for jury duty. Danny Glover and Robert Davi play two of the prisoners.
50	4	"Charlatan"	Roger Young	Michael Vittes	October 15, 1979	9505
The Tribune's religious editor (Meshach Taylor) interferes with their investigation of possible financial misdeeds in a church, while Lou is summoned to testify on behalf of a pornographer trying to publish the identities of drug enforcement agents.
51	5	"Frame-Up"	Burt Brinckerhoff	Steve Kline	October 22, 1979	9507
Billie is set up after she exposes a manufacturing company's efforts to win government concessions.
52	6	"Hype"	Peter Levin	Michele Gallery	October 29, 1979	9503
Lou uncovers a scandal at a university where he volunteers as a subject in a medical study. Harold Gould plays the head of the medical center.
53	7	"Gambling"	Alexander Singer	Bud Freeman	November 5, 1979	9510
The staff of the Tribune look at the world of gambling from different perspectives.
54	8	"Witness"	Peter Levin	Gary David Goldberg	November 12, 1979	9502
Billie must go into protective custody when her investigation of a celebrity's murder leading to another celebrity makes her the best witness in the state.
55	9	"Kidnap"	Alan Cooke	Bud Freeman	November 26, 1979	9514
The Tribune investigates the disappearance of a chartered plane loaded with high-school athletes, while Mrs. Pynchon considers selling the paper again. Jonathan Banks plays a local who puts the Tribune team up, Stanley Kamel plays a literary agent. Dominique Dunne plays '2nd girl', a classmate.
56	10	"Andrew: Part 1 - Premonition"	Roger Young	Seth Freeman	December 3, 1979	9508
Donovan's cousin Andrew (Bruce Davison) is revealed to be seriously disturbed when he's released from a mental institute, leading Donovan and his aunt (Barbara Barrie) to worry about Andrew's perilous situation. Robert Hirschfeld, another future Hill Street Blues regular, plays a computer technician.
57	11	"Andrew: Part 2 - Trial"	Peter Levin	Seth Freeman	December 10, 1979	9509
Donovan's cousin Andrew is tried for murdering a young woman, and Donovan fears that the Tribune's coverage of the case might ruin Andrew's chances at freedom.
58	12	"Hollywood"	Burt Brinckerhoff	Michele Gallery	December 17, 1979	9513
Lou uncovers a 30-year-old murder at a Hollywood nightclub, while Rossi tries to gain the confidence of the reclusive owner.
59	13	"Kids"	Alexander Singer	Michael Vittes & Shep Greene	December 24, 1979	9511
The staffers of the Tribune look for stories on children's issues. Michael J. Fox plays Paul Stone, a child attending a children's rights center. Matthew Labyorteaux (credited as Laborteaux) plays a child on Lou's baseball team. Nicholas Pryor plays the father of a child actress.
60	14	"Brushfire"	Donald A. Baer	Allan Burns & Gene Reynolds	January 7, 1980	9516
A brush fire in the foothills of the Santa Monica mountains affects some staffers of the Tribune personally. Kurtwood Smith plays a Fire Captain.
61	15	"Indians"	Ralph Senensky	April Smith	January 14, 1980	9512
The Tribune focuses on American Indians facing various problems in Los Angeles.
62	16	"Cover-Up"	Gerald Mayer	Paul Ehrmann	January 21, 1980	9517
A teacher from a private school where Mrs. Pynchon serves on the board is wrongly accused of sexual misconduct with a student, while other wrong accusations thwart an investigation of corruption within the film industry.
63	17	"Inheritance"	Roger Young	April Smith	January 28, 1980	9518
As Billie wonders if her mother took a discredited hormone treatment, Rossi gets involved with an Armenian woman who was disinherited from her father's will because she married a Turk and her family still blames the Turks for committing genocide against the Armenians.
64	18	"Censored"	Alexander Singer	Joanne Pagliaro	February 4, 1980	9515
Lou learns the source of widespread censorship and intimidation in a small town where Rossi investigates it, while the Tribune considers removing a controversial comic strip. Richard Dysart plays the small town's newspaper editor.
65	19	"Lou"	Roger Young	Michele Gallery	February 11, 1980	9519
The staffers of the Tribune are concerned about Lou when he has a bad day. Rae Dawn Chong plays Adrienne, a student journalist.
66	20	"Blackout"	Allen Williams	Steve Kline	February 18, 1980	9520
The Tribune tries to get an issue out during a blackout in Los Angeles and Charlie offends the person most likely to help them.
67	21	"Dogs"	Burt Brinckerhoff	Seth Freeman	March 3, 1980	9521
Rossi investigates a dog-fighting ring when he investigates the disappearance of Mrs. Pynchon's beloved Yorkie. Michael Jeter plays a member of the ring; Geoffrey Lewis plays a Humane Society investigator.
68	22	"Influence"	Gene Reynolds	April Smith	March 10, 1980	9522
Mrs. Pynchon attends meetings of business insiders interested in an air project, while Adam's drinking problem worries everyone in the city room.
69	23	"Guns"	Bob Sweeney	Seth Freeman	March 17, 1980	9524
Lou is stunned that a man appreciated at McKenna's is accused of delivering stolen guns to terrorists in the Emerald Isle. Rue McClanahan plays Maggie McKenna, the owner of the bar; Kurtwood Smith plays DeRopp.
70	24	"Hazard"	Burt Brinckerhoff	Michele Gallery	March 24, 1980	9523
Rossi thinks about paying off a source for an exclusive story about a company trying to ignore the safety failures of their cheap motorcycles. Ed Harris plays the editor of a motorcycle magazine; Carl Lumbly plays the owner of the motorcycle company.
