= Lou Grant season 5 =

Lou Grant
- Season 5
- No. of episodes: 24

Release
- Original network: CBS
- Original release: November 2, 1981 – September 13, 1982

Season chronology
- ← Previous; Season 4

This is a list of episodes for the fifth and final season of Lou Grant.

== Episodes ==
No. overall	No. in season	Title	Directed by	Written by	Original release date	Prod. code
91	1	"Wedding"	Alexander Singer	Seth Freeman	November 2, 1981	1501
After much worry about the conflicting demands of her career, Billie has decided to marry baseball player Ted McCovey in a ceremony at the home of Charlie Hume. Lou, too, feels the strain of his work in his relationships with his daughters, particularly Janie, and has to cancel a planned reunion in Chicago when a computer crash forces everyone at the Trib to redo the entire day's work.
92	2	"Execution"	Burt Brinckerhoff	April Smith	November 9, 1981	1502
Rossi develops a personal relationship with a woman on death row, who killed 4 people in a holdup, after she asks him to tell the world her story.
93	3	"Reckless"	Alexander Singer	Steve Kline	November 16, 1981	1503
Charlie Hume has second thoughts after starting a crime hotline that rewards people for making anonymous accusations. Meanwhile, Lou is arrested for drunk driving.
94	4	"Hometown"	Gene Reynolds	Michele Gallery	November 23, 1981	1504
Because of the death of his aunt, Lou makes a visit to his hometown of Goshen, Michigan. He has a reunion with an old girlfriend and writes a piece about the shutdown of one of the town's main employers, a glass factory that is now owned by a corporation back in Los Angeles.
95	5	"Risk"	Allen Williams	Seth Freeman	November 30, 1981	0521
For a story on purveyors of pornography, reporter Sharon McNeil has promised anonymity to her source, a mother who to pay the rent has allowed her daughter to appear illegally in such films. Lou and Mrs. Pynchon reluctantly support their reporter's refusal to reveal the mother's identity to the police.
96	6	"Double-Cross"	Roger Young	Michele Gallery	December 7, 1981	0522
Billie works with a local historian to discover the truth about a valuable gold cross, retrieved from a time capsule, which has become the pawn in a game between two feuding sides of the Matheson family.
97	7	"Drifters"	Peter Levin	Bud Freeman	December 14, 1981	1505
Charlie tries to help his nephew, a young man recovering from a nervous breakdown. The reporters at The Tribune become obsessed with the story of Ziggy, the bear who escaped from Los Angeles Zoo.
98	8	"Friends"	Seth Freeman	Seth Freeman	December 28, 1981	1510
Rossi has a crisis of conscience when he discovers that his good friend and jogging partner Burt Cary may be smearing a political opponent to win election to the city board of supervisors.
99	9	"Jazz"	Burt Brinckerhoff	Rogers Turrentine	January 4, 1982	1506
After a visit to a jazz club, Rossi tries to reunite a legendary group of musicians. Meanwhile, another investigative reporter at the Tribune tries to adjust to losing his long-time writing partner.
100	10	"Ghosts"	Roger Young	April Smith	January 11, 1982	1507
Billie looks into the history of a supposedly haunted house after a woman dies there and her husband claims a poltergeist is responsible.
101	11	"Cameras"	Peter Levin	David Lloyd	January 25, 1982	1509
Watching a hostage crisis unfold on TV, the Tribune staff bemoan the advantage television coverage of an event has in immediacy. Later, they debate the use of live cameras in the courtroom, and a mother is accused of putting her child in front of the cameras for monetary gain.
102	12	"Review"	Neil Cox	Jeffrey B. Lane	February 8, 1982	1512
When a complaint against The Tribune is judged by the News Council, a moment from Margaret Pynchon's past influences the final verdict.
103	13	"Immigrants"	Alexander Singer	Steve Kline	February 15, 1982	1511
The Tribune's new photographer, a Vietnamese refugee, encounters some difficulties at work and in his new community. A criminal gang puts pressure on him to commit fraud, the immigration services cannot handle the influx of new arrivals and the locals are upset about the changes in the neighborhood.
104	14	"Hunger"	Peter Levin	Gene Reynolds	March 1, 1982	1508
As a result of a bet, Rossi writes a story about a nun who operates a soup kitchen and a meal service for shut-ins. But when he wants to expand his investigation to the problem of hunger in a Central American nation, the Tribune editors tell him that he doesn't understand the economic realities and that the story isn't worth the time it would take.
105	15	"Recovery"	Roger Young	Michele Gallery	March 8, 1982	1513
Rossi discovers that Mrs. Pynchon's husband was one of the shady entrepreneurs who swindled Japanese-Americans out of their land when they were sent to internment camps during World War II. Meanwhile, Billie writes a story about a woman recently appointed to the police review board, who was tainted with suspicion after her doctor husband fled the country in the wake of a Medicaid scandal.
106	16	"Obituary"	Paul Stanley	April Smith	March 22, 1982	1514
Billie, Rossi and Lou struggle to write obituaries for three journalists who died in a plane crash, while Animal struggles to photograph an endangered species of moth without having the publicity endanger it further at the hands of eager collectors.
107	17	"Blacklist"	Burt Brinckerhoff	Seth Freeman	April 5, 1982	1515
Rossi learns that his girlfriend's father was one of those blacklisted because of their political leanings during the 1950s, and that another reporter at the Trib is one of those who saved himself in those dark days by becoming an FBI informant. Meanwhile, the Trib gets protests about its new column advising teens about sex, and there are threats of a boycott.
108	18	"Law"	Burt Brinckerhoff	Steve Kline	April 12, 1982	1516
Is everyone turning to lawsuits to solve their disputes? When some of a politician's disgruntled constituents petition to have him recalled, he sues them. When Lou is dissatisfied with a plumber's work, he sues the man. But then Lou is counter-sued, and faces the prospect of ruinous legal fees.
109	19	"Fireworks"	Jeff Bleckner	Michele Gallery	April 19, 1982	1517
Billie goes to the state capitol to investigate attempts to weaken fireworks regulations by industry lobbyists, one of whom is her ex-husband. Meanwhile, the Tribune staff is in conflict over Charlie's recommendation that they go after an award by the Greenwood Foundation, which has a record of disregarding the environment and selling products overseas after they have been banned in the U.S.
110	20	"Unthinkable"	Allen Williams	April Smith	May 3, 1982	1519
Tribune staff members confront the real possibility of having to cover the start of World War III, as tensions grow between the United States and the Soviet Union over a crisis in the Middle East. Meanwhile, Billie covers a young girl's struggle to recover from extensive burns suffered in the crash of a school bus.
111	21	"Suspect"	Alan Cooke	Seth Freeman	May 17, 1982	1522
An eager young reporter goes all-out to prove his theory that an environmental activist's death at the hands of a hit-and-run driver was not an accident.
112	22	"Beachhead"	Roy Campanella	Gene Reynolds	May 24, 1982	1520
After Lou witnesses their bad behavior at the beach, surfer gangs are the subject of a front page story by Rossi which is then criticized by the city council for stirring up gang warfare. Meanwhile, Billie and her husband Ted argue over the desirability of a new halfway house opening in their neighborhood for the mentally ill.
113	23	"Victims"	Peter Bogart	Steve Kline	August 30, 1982	1521
Two shootings have a big impact at the Tribune. First, Lou is shot by a robber in the parking lot after work. Then a police officer shoots and kills a man trying to rob a liquor store, but subsequently becomes depressed and abusive, and eventually joins a therapy group of fellow officers who have been forced to kill in the line of duty.
114	24	"Charlie"	Seth Freeman	Michele Gallery	September 13, 1982	1523
This episode covers a day in the life of managing editor Charlie Hume, who tries to fire two employees but is overruled by Mrs. Pynchon. He then counsels Art on a personal matter, and confronts the possibility of losing ace reporter Billie, who is talking about moving to Sacramento.
