= Lou Grant season 2 =

Lou Grant
- Season 2
- No. of episodes: 24

Release
- Original network: CBS
- Original release: September 25, 1978 (Note: That season was supposed to debut on September 18, 1978, but was postponed to the following week due to news coverage of Camp David Accords.) – May 7, 1979

Season chronology
- ← Previous; Season 1 Next → Season 3

This is a list of episodes for the second season of Lou Grant.

== Episodes ==
No. overall	No. in season	Title	Directed by	Written by	Original release date	Prod. code
23	1	"Pills"	Jay Sandrich	Michele Gallery	September 25, 1978	8502
Rossi investigates an amoral doctor who overprescribes pills for his patients, then faces a moral dilemma when he's offered stolen medical records.
24	2	"Prisoner"	Gene Reynolds	Seth Freeman	October 2, 1978	8501
Mrs. Pynchon tries to reconcile Charlie and the wife of a dictator who once had him imprisoned.
25	3	"Hooker"	Alexander Singer	Seth Freeman	October 16, 1978	8508
While investigating a prostitute's murder, Billie does a profile of a hooker (Dee Wallace) who wants out of the business. Earl Boen plays a vice-cop.
26	4	"Mob"	Corey Allen	Leon Tokatyan	October 23, 1978	8505
As Lou makes plans for the paper's annual tennis tournament, he discovers that the resort venue is being occupied by a mob meeting (one played by Nicholas Colasanto).
27	5	"Murder"	Mel Damski	Gary David Goldberg	October 30, 1978 (Note: This episode was originally scheduled to air as the season premiere on September 18, 1978, but was preempted due to news coverage of Camp David Accords.)	8504
Rossi's story about an old woman fighting a home invader (Jane Rose) is getting more coverage than Billie's story about a young ghetto mother's murder.
28	6	"Dying"	Alexander Singer	Michele Gallery	November 6, 1978	8509
Donovan goes into denial about his mother (Geraldine Fitzgerald)'s terminal illness and Billie does a story about it.
29	7	"Schools"	Burt Brinckerhoff	Gary David Goldberg	November 20, 1978	8510
The Tribune does a coverage about the issue of violence in an inner-city high school and Lou works to get a student from that school a scholarship. Special Appearance by the Rev. Jesse Jackson. Dennis Haysbert plays Victor, one of the students.
30	8	"Slaughter"	Roger Young	Bud Freeman	November 27, 1978	8503
While on a fishing trip with his old boss (Stephen Elliot), Lou discovers a mysterious illness plaguing a small town. Sally Kirkland plays a vet.
31	9	"Singles"	Michael Zinberg	Gina Frederica Goldman & Sally Robinson	December 4, 1978	8506
Rossi and Billie do a series of stories about singles in Los Angeles to make the Tribune appealing to younger readers, while Lou clashes with a newspaper consultant (Peter Donat).
32	10	"Babies"	Alexander Singer	David Lloyd	December 11, 1978	8512
Rossi and Billie pose as husband and wife in an undercover sting operation investigating a baby-selling syndicate.
33	11	"Conflict"	Mel Damski	Michele Gallery	December 18, 1978	8513
Rossi causes discord in the Tribune when he finds conflicts of interest as a newly-appointed in-house ethics czar.
34	12	"Denial"	Charles Dubin	Leonora Thuna	January 1, 1979	8507
Lou's daughter refuses to accept the fact that her son (Meeno Peluce) is deaf. Robert Pine plays Lou's son-in-law.
35	13	"Fire"	Roger Young	Seth Freeman	January 8, 1979	8514
The Tribune uncovers a scandal in a suburban fire department while investigating a series of apartment building fires.
36	14	"Vet"	Alexander Singer	Leon Tokatyan	January 15, 1979	8511
Lou tries to help an unemployed vet find work, while Animal deals with the fallout from his service in the Vietnam War. Joe Spano plays a Vietnam vet.
37	15	"Scam"	Gerald Mayer	Gary David Goldberg	January 22, 1979	8515
Lou discovers $15,000, which becomes part of an investigation regarding the intentions of Charlie's financial advisor (John Considine).
38	16	"Sweep"	Charles Dubin	Steve Kline	February 5, 1979	8517
The Tribune does a story about illegal immigration in Los Angeles, while Lou discovers the secret of Mrs. Pynchon's college-aged niece (Maureen McCormick), whom he hires as a flunky. Jonathan Banks makes his first appearance of three in the series, as a US Border Patrol officer. René Enríquez plays the owner of a cafe the Tribune staff visit.
39	17	"Samaritan"	Paul Leaf	Elliot West	February 12, 1979	8516
A psychopathic serial killer still on the loose gets the Tribune hopping.
40	18	"Hit"	Peter Levin	Michele Gallery	February 19, 1979	8519
Rossi gets personally involved with a woman (Allyn Ann McLerie) searching for her son's hit-and-run killer, while Lou becomes offended at the increasing violence in society. Ed Harris plays a car impound worker, his first appearance of three in the series.
41	19	"Home"	Alexander Singer	Gary David Goldberg	February 26, 1979	8520
Billie goes undercover to investigate a nursing home that just kicked out an old woman, while Lou interviews an involuntarily retired old man (Jack Gilford) to examine the plight of the elderly. Meshach Taylor plays a kind janitor in a badly run nursing home.
42	20	"Convention"	Charles Dubin	David Lloyd	March 5, 1979	8522
Lou, Charlie and Mrs. Pynchon attend a newspaper convention where a rumor spreads about a potential kidnapping, while Billie looks up an old college acquaintance who's now a suspected terrorist. The character Jack Riley, played by Kenneth McMillan appeared also in the first season episode 'Hoax' where he was played by Eugene Roche.
43	21	"Marathon"	Alexander Singer	Gene Reynolds	March 19, 1979	8518
As the Tribune does a story about a tunnel collapse at an excavation, Donovan considers a job offer from the governor. Michael Warren plays a journalism intern, the third main cast member from Hill Street Blues this season.
44	22	"Bomb"	Gene Reynolds	Seth Freeman	March 26, 1979	8521
A group of terrorists (supposedly Croatian) has threatened to blow up Los Angeles with a nuclear bomb, so the Tribune races to find out who came up with the plans. Rossi dates Hume's daughter (Dinah Manoff). Joe Spano makes his second appearance this season as a physicist.
45	23	"Skids"	Burt Brinckerhoff	Steve Kline	April 2, 1979	8523
Lou reunites with his old doctor (Andrew Duggan) when the Tribune investigates the murders of alcoholic bums, while Rossi worries about his father(Al Ruscio)'s new sobriety.
46	24	"Romance"	Roger Young	Michele Gallery	May 7, 1979	8524
As Billie gets involved with a story about a high-school girl trying to get pregnant on purpose, Rossi interviews a rock star being sued for "palimony" by a figure skater and Lou talks about moving in together with his girlfriend (Frances Lee McCain).

== Ratings ==
The show ranked 33rd out of 114 shows airing during the 1978-79 season, with an average 19.6/31 rating/share.
