= List of Thirtysomething episodes =

This is a list of episodes for the television series Thirtysomething.

== Series overview ==
| Season | Episodes | Originally released | |
| Season | Episodes | First released | Last released |
|---|---|---|---|
| 1 | 21 | September 29, 1987 | May 10, 1988 |
| 2 | 17 | December 6, 1988 | May 16, 1989 |
| 3 | 24 | September 19, 1989 | May 22, 1990 |
| 4 | 23 | September 25, 1990 | May 28, 1991 |

== Episodes ==
=== Season 1 (1987–88) ===
| No. overall | No. in season | Title | Directed by | Written by | Original release date | Rating/share (households) |
|---|---|---|---|---|---|---|
| 1 | 1 | "Pilot" | Marshall Herskovitz | Marshall Herskovitz & Edward Zwick | September 29, 1987 | 16.7/30 |
Hope and Michael Steadman adjust to parenthood while dealing with money problems and crises involving their best friends.
| 2 | 2 | "The Parents Are Coming, the Parents Are Coming" | Edward Zwick | Marshall Herskovitz & Edward Zwick | October 6, 1987 | 15.9/38 |
Hope's hostility towards her mother mars her parents' visit.
| 3 | 3 | "Housewarming" | John Pasquin | Edward Zwick & Marshall Herskovitz | October 13, 1987 | 13.3/23 |
As the Steadmans prepare for a housewarming, Michael feels guilty for living a yuppie lifestyle and the carpenter flirts with Hope.
| 4 | 4 | "Couples" | Marshall Herskovitz | Edward Zwick & Marshall Herskovitz | October 27, 1987 | 14.9/27 |
Hope and Michael compare their marriage to Elliot and Nancy's.
| 5 | 5 | "But Not for Me" | Tom Moore | Richard Kramer | November 3, 1987 | 13.0/24 |
Hope and Michael have a night on the town that doesn't go well, while Gary and Melissa save each other from romantic self-pity.
| 6 | 6 | "We Gather Together" | Mark Cullingham | T : Richard Kramer & Edward Zwick; S/T : Susan Miller | November 17, 1987 | 11.6/20 |
The gang celebrates a Thanksgiving they'll never forget.
| 7 | 7 | "Nice Work If You Can Get It" | Claudia Weill | S : Jean Vallely; T : Paul Haggis | December 1, 1987 | 14.7/26 |
Ellyn gives Michael and Elliot a tough account as she considers a romantic relationship with her boss.
| 8 | 8 | "Weaning" | John Pasquin | Liberty Godshall | December 8, 1987 | 12.9/25 |
Hope has mixed feelings when she returns to work after weaning Janey.
| 9 | 9 | "I'll Be Home for Christmas" | Robert Lieberman | S : Susan Monsky; T : Richard Kramer | December 15, 1987 | 12.5/22 |
Hope and Michael argue over whether to have a Christmas tree or a menorah, while a famous photographer takes an interest in Melissa.
| 10 | 10 | "South by Southeast" | Dan Lerner | Paul Haggis | January 5, 1988 | 13.9/24 |
In an homage to Alfred Hitchcock, Gary falls for a woman with past indiscretions.
| 11 | 11 | "Therapy" | Marshall Herskovitz | Susan Shilliday | January 12, 1988 | 13.5/24 |
Nancy talks Elliot into seeing a marriage counselor and Michael reveals Ellyn's tattoo.
| 12 | 12 | "Competition" | Rob Cohen | Joseph Dougherty | January 19, 1988 | 13.8/24 |
Michael thinks he's being replaced when Elliot spends more time with a new client. In the meantime, Hope and Nancy try to bond with Mr. Computer.
| 13 | 13 | "Separation" | Peter Horton | Susan Shilliday | January 26, 1988 | 13.9/22 |
Hope and Michael take up Elliot following his separation from Nancy.
| 14 | 14 | "I'm in Love, I'm in Love, I'm in Love with a Wonderful Gynecologist" | Scott Winant | T : Richard Kramer; S/T : Ann Lewis Hamilton | February 2, 1988 | 15.3/26 |
Ellyn and Melissa compete for a gynecologist's attention.
| 15 | 15 | "Business as Usual" | Claudia Weill | Paul Haggis & Marshal Herskovitz | February 9, 1988 | 14.9/24 |
Michael's father arrives with a surprise announcement that tests the family during a celebration.
| 16 | 16 | "Accounts Receivable" | Edward Zwick | Richard Kramer | March 1, 1988 | 12.7/21 |
Leo Steadman dies from cancer, leaving Michael to deal with death on his own when unfinished business between him and his brother comes to a head over money.
| 17 | 17 | "Whose Forest is This?" | Peter Horton | S : Kathleen Tolan; T : Richard Kramer | March 15, 1988 | 12.8/23 |
As Ethan frets over his parents' separation, Elliot worries about a blind date.
| 18 | 18 | "Nancy's First Date" | Ron Lagomarsino | Susan Shilliday | March 22, 1988 | 15.1/27 |
Nancy has her first date since the separation, while Melissa and Dr. Bob have a disagreement over whether to have kids.
| 19 | 19 | "Undone" | Dan Lerner | Joseph Dougherty | April 12, 1988 | 13.3/23 |
Michael's college friend comes to visit, leading him to face his past as she makes an impact on his loved ones.
| 20 | 20 | "Tenure" | Ken Gilbert | S : John Olive; T : Ann Lewis Hamilton | May 3, 1988 | 11.2/19 |
Gary is up for tenure and Ellyn is thinking of buying her co-op apartment.
| 21 | 21 | "Born to Be Mild" | Ron Lagomarsino | Jerry Stahl | May 10, 1988 | 12.6/22 |
Ellyn and Woodman are left with the baby as Michael and Hope go off on a romantic weekend.

=== Season 2 (1988–89) ===
| No. overall | No. in season | Title | Directed by | Written by | Original release date | U.S. viewers (millions) |
|---|---|---|---|---|---|---|
| 22 | 1 | "We'll Meet Again" | Scott Winant | Richard Kramer | December 6, 1988 | 20.2 |
Hope discovers World War II mementos belonging to a woman who once lived in their house as she struggles with her decision to have another baby.
| 23 | 2 | "In Re: The Marriage of Weston" | Peter Horton | Susan Shilliday | December 13, 1988 | 21.2 |
Nancy and Elliot each find new significant others while submitting to a divorce arbitrator's indignities.
| 24 | 3 | "The Mike Van Dyke Show" | Ron Lagomarsino | Marshal Herskovitz & Edward Zwick | December 20, 1988 | 18.9 |
With the holidays around the corner, the Steadman home endures more religious uncertainty as Michael prepares for a trip to Chicago for the unveiling of his father's headstone.
| 25 | 4 | "Trust Me" | Steve Robman | Richard Kramer | January 3, 1989 | 24.6 |
Melissa considers having a baby with Gary and seeks further counseling from a new friend.
| 26 | 5 | "No Promises" | Ken Olin | Liberty Godshall | January 10, 1989 | 19.9 |
Ellyn learns of her parents' divorce as she begins her relationship with Woodman.
| 27 | 6 | "Politics" | Claudia Weill | S : Jerry Stahl; T : Susan Shilliday | January 17, 1989 | 15.7 |
Gary tries to determine his relationship with Susannah, while Michael agrees to handle a dubious candidate's ad campaign.
| 28 | 7 | "Success" | Ron Lagomarsino | Edward Zwick & Marshall Herskovitz | January 31, 1989 | 21.2 |
Melissa is hired to shoot Carly Simon's album cover and Michael and Elliot hit a roadblock on the path to success.
| 29 | 8 | "First Day/Last Day" | Peter Horton | Joseph Dougherty | February 7, 1989 | 16.3 |
Michael and Elliot's partnership falls apart as Michael interviews for a new job and Elliot seems determined to go down with the ship.
| 30 | 9 | "About Last Night" | Gary Sinise | S : Tammy Ader; T : Ann Lewis Hamilton | February 14, 1989 | N/A |
The love-hate relationship between Gary and Susannah takes an unexpected turn when they take their conflict into the bedroom and Nancy tries to meet the deadline for her book.
| 31 | 10 | "Elliot's Dad" | Dan Lerner | Joseph Dougherty | February 28, 1989 | 17.6 |
Elliot tries to win his son's affection, but seems destined to follow in the footsteps of his divorced father.
| 32 | 11 | "Payment Due" | Ron Lagomarsino | Cynthia Saunders | March 7, 1989 | 21.6 |
Ellyn gets an ulcer when stress leads her to lash out at Hope and Woodman and find nourishment from another man.
| 33 | 12 | "Deliverance" | Peter Horton | Ann Lewis Hamilton | March 21, 1989 | 22.0 |
The women face some past demons on a camping trip, while the men call a truce to keep the home fires burning.
| 34 | 13 | "Michael Writes a Story" | Tim Moore | Joseph Dougherty | April 4, 1989 | 18.0 |
When Michael ends up in the same writing workshop with Nancy, he learns truth about fiction as he uses her life for a book. Meanwhile, he and Elliot consider a job offer.
| 35 | 14 | "New Job" | Joshua Brand | Ann Lewis Hamilton | April 11, 1989 | 16.7 |
Michael tries to keep it together at his new job while he and Hope try to deal with a devastating loss without dealing with each other.
| 36 | 15 | "Be a Good Girl" | Richard Kramer | Richard Kramer | April 25, 1989 | 18.3 |
Although Melissa is a good girl for her grandmother, she tries not to feel guilty when she receives an offer from Rose.
| 37 | 16 | "Courting Nancy" | Ken Olin | Susan Shilliday | May 2, 1989 | 18.0 |
Elliot tries to talk Nancy out of ending their marriage as they enter a new chapter of their relationship.
| 38 | 17 | "Best of Enemies" | Joseph Dougherty | Joseph Dougherty | May 16, 1989 | 16.3 |
Hope discovers that Susannah has diverted funds at the Race Street project, but Gary asks her not to write about it.

=== Season 3 (1989–90) ===
| No. overall | No. in season | Title | Directed by | Written by | Original release date | U.S. viewers (millions) |
|---|---|---|---|---|---|---|
| 39 | 1 | "Nancy's Mom" | Ron Lagomarsino | Ann Lewis Hamilton | September 19, 1989 | 18.1 |
Nancy's mom visits just as she's about to settle with Elliot.
| 40 | 2 | "Love and Sex" | Marshall Herskovitz | Liberty Godshall | October 3, 1989 | 19.1 |
Michael and Hope see their babysitter in the joys of young love when they lose sexual attraction to each other.
| 41 | 3 | "Mr. Right" | Scott Winant | Jill Gordon | October 10, 1989 | 19.4 |
Melissa and Ellyn decide to take a shot at video dating to find the right men.
| 42 | 4 | "New Baby" | Marshall Herskovitz | Ann Lewis Hamilton | October 24, 1989 | 20.3 |
Susannah seems reluctant to take on the responsibility of motherhood as Gary helps her go through labor.
| 43 | 5 | "Legacy" | Scott Winant | Joseph Dougherty | October 31, 1989 | 16.3 |
Michael and Elliot's near-death experience leads the Steadmans to write a will and the Westons to further their reconciliation.
| 44 | 6 | "Strangers" | Peter O'Fallon | Richard Kramer | November 7, 1989 | 15.9 |
Melissa isn't sure about her feelings for a younger man and Russell isn't sure about a new man he's just met.
| 45 | 7 | "Pilgrims" | Ken Olin | Richard Kramer | November 21, 1989 | 17.7 |
With Thanksgiving around the corner, Elliot moves back in and a rash of neighborhood robberies frightens Ethan.
| 46 | 8 | "The Burning Bush" | Mary Beth Fielder | Susan Shilliday | November 28, 1989 | 18.5 |
Ellyn thinks about seeing a married man, putting her long-time friendship with Hope in jeopardy.
| 47 | 9 | "New Parents" | Gary Sinise | Ann Lewis Hamilton | December 5, 1989 | 16.8 |
Gary decides to stay home with the baby while Susannah goes back to work, only for his mother to show up and make things difficult.
| 48 | 10 | "Michael's Campaign" | Joseph Dougherty | Joseph Dougherty | December 12, 1989 | 17.0 |
In his fight over a campaign with the creative director, Michael creates a strategy taken from a similar incident in his adolescent years.
| 49 | 11 | "Pulling Away" | Rob Cohen | Joseph Dougherty | January 9, 1990 | 15.7 |
Michael puts a strain on his relationship with Elliot when he becomes the agency's "temporary" creative director and Hope's increased workload puts a strain on their marriage.
| 50 | 12 | "Another Country" | Ron Lagomarsino | Richard Kramer | January 16, 1990 | 18.8 |
An unexpected occurrence puts an end to Nancy and Ethan's excitement over their book being published.
| 51 | 13 | "Post-Op" | Peter Horton | Susan Shilliday | January 23, 1990 | 21.4 |
Nancy is pushed to the breaking point by her sister's good intentions, Elliot's coddling and her friends' awkward reactions.
| 52 | 14 | "Once a Mermaid" | Ellen S. Pressman | S : Ellen Simon; T : Ann Lewis Hamilton | February 6, 1990 | 16.0 |
Ellyn has a secret relationship with Jeffrey.
| 53 | 15 | "Fathers and Lovers" | Peter O'Fallon | T : Winnie Holzman; S/T : Ramsey Fadiman | February 13, 1990 | 13.1 |
Melissa thinks she's created a monster when she talks Lee into getting a job at DAA, then realizes she's inherited her mad-scientist manipulations from her father.
| 54 | 16 | "Her Cup Runneth Over" | Timothy Busfield | Winnie Holzman | February 20, 1990 | 17.1 |
Ellyn feels like she's stolen Jeffrey when he leaves his wife.
| 55 | 17 | "Good Sex, Bad Sex, What Sex, No Sex" | Scott Winant | Jill Gordon | February 27, 1990 | 16.4 |
Melissa has too much sex, Gary and Susannah don't have enough and it becomes a point of disagreement between Elliot and Nancy.
| 56 | 18 | "The Other Shoe" | Ken Olin | Joseph Dougherty | March 20, 1990 | 17.7 |
A fellow cancer patient offers Nancy advice that further separates her from her family and friends.
| 57 | 19 | "Three Year Itch" | Victor DuBois | Ann Lewis Hamilton | April 3, 1990 | 15.4 |
Although the incinerator project has come to an end, Hope's relationship with John seems to linger and Michael feels guilty about keeping his own secret from Elliot.
| 58 | 20 | "I'm Nobody, Who Are You?" | Richard Kramer | Winnie Holzman | April 10, 1990 | 15.7 |
Gary and Susannah want a taste of the good life, while Michael and Hope are envious of their work lives.
| 59 | 21 | "Arizona" | Edward Zwick | Susan Shilliday | April 17, 1990 | 18.1 |
Hope and Michael travel to Arizona for the 40th anniversary of Hope's parents, only for tensions between them to erupt in the desert.
| 60 | 22 | "Going Limp" | Melanie Mayron | Hugh O'Neill | May 1, 1990 | 15.2 |
Elliot talks Michael and Ellyn into letting him shoot his first commercial for the city.
| 61 | 23 | "The Go Between" "The Towers of Zenith: Part 1" | Scott Winant | Joseph Dougherty | May 15, 1990 | 13.7 |
Michael suspects a change in the air at DAA thanks to their biggest client, while Miles wants Elliot out. In 1997, TV Guide ranked this episode (along with part 2) #22 on its list of the 100 Greatest Episodes.
| 62 | 24 | "Samurai Ad Man" "The Towers of Zenith: Part 2" | Joseph Dougherty | Joseph Dougherty | May 22, 1990 | 15.7 |
As a corporate mole, Michael tries to figure out Miles' behavior in order to stop the takeover attempt. In 1997, TV Guide ranked this episode (along with part 1) #22 on its list of the 100 Greatest Episodes.

=== Season 4 (1990–91) ===
| No. overall | No. in season | Title | Directed by | Written by | Original release date | U.S. viewers (millions) |
|---|---|---|---|---|---|---|
| 63 | 1 | "Prelude to a Bris" | Richard Kramer | Richard Kramer | September 25, 1990 | 14.6 |
The Steadmans have a son, but are unsure about the bris and Michael resents his mother's boyfriend.
| 64 | 2 | "Life Class" | Scott Winant | Winnie Holzman | October 2, 1990 | 16.5 |
Nancy is told by her doctors that her lack of desire is all in her head, but she has a different theory when she fantasizes about an art student.
| 65 | 3 | "Control" | Ellen S. Pressman | Ann Lewis Hamilton | October 9, 1990 | 14.9 |
Melissa treads on thin ice with Miles while Jeffrey and Ellyn aren't so sure about living together.
| 66 | 4 | "The Distance" | Melanie Mayron | Joseph Dougherty | October 16, 1990 | 13.1 |
A job in New York leads Susannah and Gary to consider a two-city relationship and Jeffrey chooses the long-distance without Ellyn.
| 67 | 5 | "The Haunting of DAA" | Joseph Dougherty | Ann Lewis Hamilton | October 30, 1990 | 13.8 |
With Halloween around the corner, Miles assigns Michael the task of firing people.
| 68 | 6 | "The Guilty Party" | Norman Seeff | Winnie Holzman | November 13, 1990 | 13.3 |
Hope's inadequacies seem to overwhelm her as she prepares for Michael's surprise birthday party.
| 69 | 7 | "Photo Opportunity" | Ellen S. Pressman | Racelle Rossett Schaefer | November 27, 1990 | 12.7 |
Melissa tries to focus on a possible photo assignment for a magazine, but the situation with her mother could make it difficult.
| 70 | 8 | "Never Better" | Ann Lewis Hamilton | Joseph Dougherty | December 4, 1990 | 14.5 |
Ellyn and Gary are still adjusting to being friends as they face the temptation of seeing other people.
| 71 | 9 | "Guns and Roses" | Ken Olin | Liberty Godshall | December 11, 1990 | 16.4 |
Nancy's chemotherapy takes its toll and Ethan keeps coming home with bruises.
| 72 | 10 | "Happy New Year" | Victor Du Bois | Richard Kramer | December 18, 1990 | 14.8 |
The group gathers at the Steadmans' home for New Year's Eve, but Hope is unable to forget the death of an old acquaintance.
| 73 | 11 | "Melissa and Men" | Randall Miller | Winnie Holzman | January 8, 1991 | 14.0 |
While organizing her first gallery show, Melissa discovers that her work seems to express her inhibitions about men.
| 74 | 12 | "Advanced Beginners" | Deborah Reinisch | Liberty Godshall and Winnie Holzman | January 22, 1991 | 14.2 |
Just as Billy's relationship with Ellyn is heating up, his ex-girlfriend pays a visit.
| 75 | 13 | "Sifting the Ashes" | Martin Nicholson | W.H. Macy & Steven Schachter and Joseph Dougherty | February 5, 1991 | 14.7 |
As Nancy begins her final round of chemotherapy, Ethan looks for something to believe in and Elliot's mother brings him face-to-face with his religious upbringing.
| 76 | 14 | "Second Look" | Ken Olin | Ann Lewis Hamilton | February 12, 1991 | 17.2 |
Nancy goes through her second-look surgery, then she and Elliot wait for the results. In 2009, TV Guide ranked this episode #34 on its list of the 100 Greatest Episodes.
| 77 | 15 | "Fighting the Cold" | Joseph Dougherty | Joseph Dougherty | February 19, 1991 | 17.2 |
Recent events bring out strong emotions in the Steadman home.
| 78 | 16 | "The Difference Between Men and Women" | Timothy Busfield | Winnie Holzman | February 26, 1991 | 15.9 |
Melissa sets off a battle of the sexes that culminates in Billy and Ellyn throwing night-out parties.
| 79 | 17 | "The Wedding" | Scott Winant | Jill Gordon | April 9, 1991 | 18.7 |
As the wedding day approaches, Ellyn isn't sure her marriage will be stable, while Melissa and Lee take a step toward reconciliation.
| 80 | 18 | "Closing the Circle" | Richard Kramer | Paul Monette and Richard Kramer | April 16, 1991 | 16.9 |
Michael searches for Gary's ghost on how to help another friend who's decided to get tested for AIDS.
| 81 | 19 | "Out the Door" | Mel Harris | Ann Lewis Hamilton | April 30, 1991 | 12.9 |
Tough times at DAA lead Miles to make Michael an offer and Elliot to consider quitting.
| 82 | 20 | "Hopeless" | Mark Harris | Liberty Godshall | May 7, 1991 | 14.1 |
Hope tries to help the homeless mother and children she met at the shelter where she's doing volunteer work.
| 83 | 21 | "A Stop at Willoughby" | Timothy Busfield | Joseph Dougherty | May 14, 1991 | 12.4 |
Michael fights with Miles over an actor-spokesman's unpopular opinion on the war.
| 84 | 22 | "Melissa in Wonderland" | Ellen S. Pressman | Winnie Holzman | May 21, 1991 | 12.8 |
Melissa goes to Hollywood to shoot a sitcom star who incorporates Melissa's character into her own.
| 85 | 23 | "California" | Scott Winant | Marshall Herskovitz & Edward Zwick & Liberty Godshall & Susan Shilliday & Joseph Dougherty & Winnie Holzman & Richard Kramer & Ann Lewis Hamilton | May 28, 1991 | 18.4 |
When Michael considers moving to California, he and Hope reach a crossroads in their marriage.
