= Primetime Emmy Award for Outstanding Original Music and Lyrics =

Annual TV award

- Awarded for: Outstanding Original Music and Lyrics
- Country: United States
- Presented by: Academy of Television Arts & Sciences
- First award: 1970
- Currently held by: The Pitt, "Need Someone" (2026)
- Website: emmys.com

The Primetime Emmy Award for Outstanding Original Music and Lyrics is an award presented annually by the Academy of Television Arts & Sciences. It is awarded to the best original song or score created specifically for a television program.

The award has gone by several names:

- Outstanding Achievement in Music, Lyrics and Special Material (1970–1973)
- Best Song or Theme (1974)
- Outstanding Achievement in Special Musical Material (1975–1978)
- Outstanding Achievement in Music and Lyrics (1981–1991)
- Outstanding Individual Achievement in Music and Lyrics (1992–1995)
- Outstanding Music and Lyrics (1996–2005)
- Outstanding Original Music and Lyrics (2006–present)

== Winners and nominations ==
=== 1970s ===
Year	Program	Song	Composer / Lyricist	Network
1970	Love, American Style		Charles Fox & Arnold Margolin (music & lyrics)	ABC
1970	Rowan & Martin's Laugh-In ("Carol Channing")		Billy Barnes (music & lyrics)	NBC
1970	Spoon River		Charles Aidman & Naomi C. Hirshhorn (music & lyrics)	CBS
1971	The First Nine Months Are the Hardest		Ray Charles (music & lyrics)	NBC
1971	The Dean Martin Show		Lee Hale (music & lyrics)	NBC
1971	The Name of the Game		Billy Goldenberg & David Wilson (music & lyrics)	NBC
1971	Pure Goldie		Billy Barnes (music & lyrics)	NBC
1972	The Funny Side ("The Funny Side of Marriage")		Ray Charles (music & lyrics)	NBC
1972	Rowan & Martin's Laugh-In ("Liza Minnelli")		Billy Barnes (music & lyrics)	CBS
1972	The Sonny & Cher Comedy Hour		Earl Brown (music & lyrics)	CBS
1973	Liza with a Z		Fred Ebb & John Kander (music & lyrics)	NBC
1973	The Marcus-Nelson Murders (The CBS Thursday Night Movie)	"Don't Give Me a Road I Can't Walk"	Billy Goldenberg & Bobby Russell (music & lyrics)	CBS
1973	The Sonny & Cher Comedy Hour ("Lyle Waggoner & Jean Stapleton")	"The Gloria Majestic Story"	Earl Brown (music & lyrics)	CBS
1974	Ironside ("Once More For Joey")	"Light My Way"	David & Marty Paich (music & lyrics)	NBC
1974	The Autobiography of Miss Jane Pittman	"The Love That Lights Our Way"	Fred Karlin (music & lyrics)	CBS
1974	Kojak		Billy Goldenberg (music & lyrics)	CBS
1975	Queen of the Stardust Ballroom		Alan & Marilyn Bergman & Billy Goldenberg (music & lyrics)	CBS
1975	Cher ("Bette Midler, Flip Wilson & Elton John")		Billy Barnes & Earl Brown (music & lyrics)	CBS
1975	Chico and the Man	Theme	Janna Merlyn & José Feliciano (music & lyrics)	NBC
1975	Police Woman	Theme	Morton Stevens (music & lyrics)	NBC
1975	Shirley MacLaine: If They Could See Me Now		Cy Coleman & Bob Wells (music & lyrics)	CBS
1976	The Carol Burnett Show ("The Pointer Sisters")	"Cinderella Gets It On!"	Artie Malvin, Ken & Mitzie Welch (music & lyrics)	CBS
1976	Gypsy in My Soul		Cy Coleman & Fred Ebb (music & lyrics)	CBS
1977 (Note: As a juried award, nominees had to garner 50% approval to win the award. The benchmark was not met and no award was given.)	America Salutes Richard Rodgers: The Sound of His Music		Larry Grossman (music & lyrics)	CBS
1977	An Evening with Diana Ross		Bill Dyer & Billy Goldenberg (music & lyrics)	NBC
1977	How the West Was Won	Theme	Jerrold Immel (music & lyrics)	ABC
1977	Minstrel Man	"Early in the Morning"	Fred Karlin (music); Meg Karlin (lyrics)	CBS
1977	Police Woman ("Killer Cowboys")	"Leave Me Tomorrow"	Morton Stevens (music); Hermine Hilton (lyrics)	NBC
1978	Outstanding Achievement in Special Music Material			
1978	The Carol Burnett Show ("Steve Lawrence")	"Hi-Hat"	Stan Freeman & Arthur Malvin (music & lyrics)	CBS
1978	The Sentry Collection Presents Ben Vereen: His Roots	"See You Tomorrow in Class"	Ken & Mitzie Welch (music & lyrics)	ABC
1978	Donny & Marie ("Ray Bolger")	"Leading Lady"	Earl Brown (music & lyrics)	ABC
1978	Poldark (Masterpiece Theatre)	Theme	Kenyon Emrys-Roberts (music & lyrics)	PBS
1978	Ziegfeld: The Man and His Women	"Until the Music Ends"	Dick DeBenedictis (music); Bill Dyer (lyrics)	NBC
1978	Outstanding Achievement in Coverage of Special Events - Individuals (Note: As a juried award, nominees had to garner 50% approval to win the award. The nominee did not meet the benchmark and no award was given.)			
1978	The 50th Annual Academy Awards	"Look How Far We've Come"	Buz Kohan (music & lyrics)	ABC

=== 1980s ===
Year	Program	Song	Composer / Lyricist	Network
1980	Outstanding Individual Achievement - Special Events (Note: As a juried award, nominees had to garner 50% approval to win the award. The nominees did not meet the benchmark and no award was given.)			
1980	The 52nd Annual Academy Awards	"Dancin' on the Silver Screen"	Larry Grossman (music); Buz Kohan (lyrics)	ABC
1981	Linda in Wonderland	"This Is My Night"	Ken & Mitzie Welch (music & lyrics)	CBS
1981	All Commercials... A Steve Martin Special	"Truman Capote Jeans"	Earl Brown (music & lyrics)	NBC
1981	Perry Como's Christmas in the Holy Land	"The City of Tradition"	Ray Charles (music & lyrics)	ABC
1981	Homeward Bound	"Home"	Fred Karlin (music); David Pomeranz (lyrics)	CBS
1981	The Way They Were	"In the Beginning"	Larry Grossman (music); Sheldon Harnick (lyrics)	Syndicated
1982	Shirley MacLaine... Illusions	"On the Outside Looking In"	Larry Grossman (music); Buz Kohan (lyrics)	CBS
1982	Advice to the Lovelorn	"If This is Love"	James Di Pasquale (music); Carol Connors (lyrics)	NBC
1982	The Gift of Life	"Just a Little More Love"	Billy Goldenberg (music); Harry Shannon (lyrics)	CBS
1982	The Greatest American Hero ("Dreams")	"Dreams"	Stephen Geyer (music & lyrics)	ABC
1982	Night of 100 Stars	"What's Your Line?"	Kohan (music & lyrics)	ABC
1982	Walt Disney... One Man's Dream	"Marceline"	Ken & Mitzie Welch (music & lyrics)	CBS
1983	Two of a Kind (GE Theater)	"We'll Win This World"	James Di Pasquale (music); Dory Previn (lyrics)	CBS
1983	The 55th Annual Academy Awards	"And It All Comes Down to This"	Larry Grossman (music); Buz Kohan (lyrics)	ABC
1983	Bare Essence	"In Finding You, I Found Love"	Carol Connors & Billy Goldenberg (music & lyrics)	CBS
1983	Cheers ("Give Me a Ring Sometime")	"Where Everybody Knows Your Name"	Judy Hart-Angelo & Gary Portnoy (music & lyrics)	NBC
1983	Happy Endings	Theme Song	William Goldstein (music); Molly-Ann Leikin (lyrics)	CBS
1983	Quincy, M.E. ("Quincy's Wedding, Part 2")	"Quincy's Wedding Song"	Bruce Broughton (music); Mark Mueller (lyrics)	NBC
1983	Suzanne Somers... and 10,000 G.I.'s	"We're Not So Dumb"	Earl Brown & Artie Butler (music & lyrics)	CBS
1984	Here's Television Entertainment	"Gone Too Soon"	Larry Grossman (music); Buz Kohan (lyrics)	NBC
1984	Burnett Discovers Domingo	"No Time Now"	Ken & Mitzie Welch (music & lyrics)	CBS
1984	Fame ("Break Dance")	"I Still Believe In Me"	Gary Portnoy & Susan Sheridan (music & lyrics)	Syndicated
1984	Fame ("Catch a Falling Star")	"Whatever Happened to the Heroes?"	Earl Brown (music); Brown & Jean-Pierre Philippe (lyrics)	Syndicated
1984	Two Marriages	"Home Here"	Bruce Broughton (music); Dory Previn (lyrics)	ABC
1985	Love Lives On	"Wildflower" & "Lullaby"	James Di Pasquale (music); Douglas Brayfield (lyrics)	NBC
1985	Disneyland's 30th Anniversary Celebration	"Thank You (For Thirty Happy Years)"	Ken & Mitzie Welch (music & lyrics)	NBC
1985	Moonlighting ("Pilot")	"Moonlighting"	Lee Holdridge (music); Al Jarreau (lyrics)	ABC
1985	Motown Returns to the Apollo	"Tall, Tan, and Teasing"	Earl Brown (music); Brown & Debbie Allen (lyrics)	NBC
1986	Andy Williams and the NBC Kids Search for Santa	"My Christmas Wish"	Larry Grossman (music); Buz Kohan (lyrics)	NBC
1986	All-Star Party for "Dutch" Reagan	"America Is Changing Back to What She Used to Be"	Earl Brown (music); Brown & Toby Martin (lyrics)	CBS
1986	America Picks the #1 Song	"Take It to the People"	Ray Charles (music & lyrics)	ABC
1986	Growing Pains	"As Long As We Got Each Other"	Steve Dorff (music); John Bettis (lyrics)	ABC
1986	The Third Annual NBC All-Star Hour	"One Big Happy Family"	Ken & Mitzie Welch (music & lyrics)	NBC
1986	The 12th People's Choice Awards	"The People's Choice"	Brown (music & lyrics)	CBS
1987	Liberty Weekend: Opening Ceremonies	"Welcome to Liberty"	Larry Grossman (music); Buz Kohan (lyrics)	ABC
1987	The 59th Annual Academy Awards	"Sing Me the Song, the Song from the Movie"	Ken & Mitzie Welch (music & lyrics)	ABC
1987	Jack and Mike ("Fire and Ice")	"This Love's for Real"	Nan Schwartz (music & lyrics)	ABC
1987	Liberty Weekend: Closing Ceremonies	"Liberty! Remember, Rejoice, Renew"	Earl Brown (music & lyrics)	ABC
1988	Julie Andrews: The Sound of Christmas	"The Sound of Christmas"	Larry Grossman (music); Buz Kohan (lyrics)	ABC
1988	Growing Pains ("Aloha")	"Swept Away"	Steve Dorff (music); John Bettis & Christopher Cross (lyrics)	ABC
1988	Happy Birthday, Bob: 50 Stars Salute Your 50 Years with NBC	"Comedy Ain't No Joke"	Cy Coleman & James Lipton (music & lyrics)	NBC
1988	NBC Investigates Bob Hope	"A Man Is Innocent/Until Proven Guilty"	Bob Alberti (music); Martha Bolton & Gene Perret (lyrics)	NBC
1989	Beauty and the Beast ("A Distant Shore")	"The First Time I Loved Forever"	Lee Holdridge (music); Melanie (lyricist)	CBS
1989	Dadah Is Death ("Part 1")	"In The Light of Our Love"	Fred Karlin (music); John Milligan (lyrics)	CBS
1989	Roseanne ("Radio Days")	"I'll Never Change My Mind"	Dan Foliart & Howard Pearl (music); Foliart (lyrics)	ABC
1989	Sesame Street… 20 Years & Still Counting	"Look Through the Window"	Joe Raposo (music & lyrics)	NBC
1989	Shining Time Station ("A Place Unlike Any Other")	"Start Where You Are"	Larry Grossman (music); Ellen Fitzhugh (lyrics)	PBS

=== 1990s ===
Year	Program	Song	Composer / Lyricist	Network
1990	From the Heart... The First International Very Special Arts Festival		Larry Grossman (music); Buz Kohan (lyrics)	NBC
1990	Perry Mason: The Case of the Silenced Singer	""I'll Be the One"	Dick DeBenedictis (music & lyrics)	NBC
1990	Sammy Davis Jr.'s 60th Anniversary Celebration	"You Were There"	Kohan & Michael Jackson (music & lyrics)	ABC
1990	Twin Peaks ("Episode 5")	"Into the Night"	Angelo Badalamenti (music); David Lynch (lyrics)	ABC
1991	Cop Rock ("Pilot")	"He's Guilty!"	Randy Newman (music & lyrics)	ABC
1991	Cop Rock ("Oil of Ol'Lay")	"Nowhere to Go, Nothin' to Do"	Ron Boustead & Greg Edmonson (music & lyrics)	ABC
1991	Life Goes On ("Corky's Travels")	"Bittersweet Waltz"	Craig Safan (music); Mark Mueller (lyrics)	ABC
1991	The Lost Capone	"I Didn't Hear You"	Mark Snow (music); Glynn Snow (lyrics)	TNT
1991	Matlock ("The Critic")	"Love and Justice"	Dick DeBenedictis (music & lyrics)	NBC
1992	Cast a Deadly Spell	"Why Do I Lie?"	Curt Sobel (music); Dennis Spiegel (lyrics)	HBO
1992	The Carol Burnett Show ("404")	"Rock Out of That Rockin' Chair"	Ken & Mitzie Welch (music & lyrics)	CBS
1992	A Salute to America's Pets	"Love Without Strings"	Carol Connors & Jimmie Haskell (music & lyrics)	ABC
1992	The Walt Disney Company Presents the American Teacher Awards	"We Have Come to Learn"	Larry Grossman (music); Buz Kohan (lyrics)	Disney
1993	Liza Minnelli Live from Radio City Music Hall	"Sorry I Asked"	John Kander (music); Fred Ebb (lyrics)	NPT
1993	Blind Spot	"Good Things Grow"	Patrick Williams (music); Arthur Hamilton (lyrics)	CBS
1993	Bob Hope: The First 90 Years	"Where There's Life, There's Hope"	Ray Charles (music); Buz Kohan (lyrics)	NBC
1993	The Heights	"How Do You Talk to an Angel"	Barry Coffing & Steve Tyrell (music); Stephanie Tyrell (lyrics)	Fox
1993	I'll Fly Away	"State Until You Come Home"	Stephen James Taylor	NBC
1994	Trisha Yearwood: The Song Remembers When	"The Song Remembers When"	Hugh Prestwood (music & lyrics)	Disney
1994	Carol Burnett: The Special Years	"One Lucky Lady"	Ken & Mitzie Welch (music & lyrics)	CBS
1994	The Corpse Had a Familiar Face	"Something Is Out There"	Patrick Williams (music); Arthur Hamilton (lyrics)	CBS
1994	Murder, She Wrote ("A Death in Hong Kong")	"The Game's Not the Same"	Bruce Babcock (music); Tom Sawyer (lyrics)	CBS
1994	The Simpsons ("Homer and Apu")	"Who Needs the Kwik-E-Mart?"	Alf Clausen (music); Greg Daniels (lyrics)	Fox
1994	The Tony Awards	"Celebrate Broadway"	Larry Grossman (music); Buz Kohan (lyrics)	CBS
1995	Barbra Streisand: The Concert	"Ordinary Miracles"	Marvin Hamlisch (music); Alan & Marilyn Bergman (lyrics)	HBO
1995	Cagney & Lacey: Together Again	"All the Days aka Rooftop Source"	Nan Schwartz Mishkin (music & lyrics)	CBS
1995	Robbie Robertson: Going Home	"Pray"	Robbie Robertson (music & lyrics)	Disney
1995	A Season of Hope	"For a Love Like You"	Ken Thorne (music); Dennis Spiegel (lyrics)	CBS
1995	The Simpsons ("Homer the Great")	"We Do (The Stonecutters Song)"	Alf Clausen (music); John Swartzwelder (lyrics)	Fox
1996	Bye Bye Birdie	"Let's Settle Down"	Charles Strouse (music); Lee Adams (lyrics)	ABC
1996	Mr. Willowby's Christmas Tree	"The Perfect Tree"	Michael & Patty Silversher (music & lyrics)	CBS
1996	People: A Musical Celebration	"Children of the World"	Nona Hendryx & Jason Miles (music & lyrics)	Disney
1996	The Simpsons ("Who Shot Mr. Burns?, Part 2")	"Señor Burns"	Alf Clausen (music); Bill Oakley & Josh Weinstein (lyrics)	Fox
1996	The Walt Disney Company and McDonald's Present the American Teacher Awards	"Come on In"	Larry Grossman (music); Buz Kohan (lyrics)	Disney
1997	The Simpsons ("Bart After Dark")	"We Put the Spring in Springfield"	Alf Clausen (music); Ken Keeler (lyrics)	Fox
1997	Boo to You Too! Winnie the Pooh	"I Wanna Scare Myself"	Michael & Patty Silversher (music & lyrics)	CBS
1997	Centennial Olympic Games: Opening Ceremonies	"The Power of the Dream"	Babyface & David Foster (music); Linda Thompson (lyrics)	NBC
1997	Centennial Olympic Games: Opening Ceremonies	"Faster, Higher, Stronger"	Mark Watters (music); Lorraine Feather (lyrics)	NBC
1997	Mrs. Santa Claus	"Mrs. Santa Claus"	Jerry Herman (music & lyrics)	CBS
1998	The Simpsons ("The City of New York vs. Homer Simpson")	"You're Checkin' In (A Musical Tribute to the Betty Ford Center)"	Alf Clausen (music); Ken Keeler (lyrics)	Fox
1998	The Closer ("Baby, It's Cold Outside")	"You Don't Know Jack"	Ed Alton (music); Ron Burch & David Kidd (lyrics)	CBS
1998	Mr. Show with Bob and David ("Peanut Butter, Eggs, and Dice")	"How High the Mountain"	David Cross, Eban Schletter & Dino Stamatopoulos (music); Cross, Bill, Bob Odenkirk & Stamatopoulos (lyrics)	HBO
1998	Xena: Warrior Princess ("The Bitter Suite")	"Hearts Are Hurting"	Joseph LoDuca (music); Dennis Spiegel (lyrics)	Syndicated
1998	Xena: Warrior Princess ("The Bitter Suite")	"The Love of Your Love"	LoDuca (music & lyrics)	Syndicated
1999	AFI's 100 Years...100 Movies: America's Greatest Movies	"A Ticket to Dream"	Marvin Hamlisch (music); Alan & Marilyn Bergman (lyrics)	CBS
1999	Home Improvement ("The Long and Winding Road (Part 2)")	"We've Got It All"	Dan Foliart (music & lyrics)	ABC
1999	Penn & Teller's Sin City Spectacular ("Episode 118")	"Freedom Dot Com"	Gary Stockdale (music); Colman deKay, Penn & Teller (lyrics)	FX
1999	Winnie the Pooh: A Valentine for You	"Places in the Heart"	Michael & Patty Silversher (music & lyrics)	ABC
1999	You Lucky Dog	"Togetherness"	David Michael Frank (music); Todd Smallwood (lyrics)	Disney

=== 2000s ===
Year	Program	Song	Composer / Lyricist	Network
2000	Nickellennium	"Up to You"	John Kimbrough (music & lyrics)	Nickelodeon
2000	The 14th Annual American Comedy Awards	"My Bill Gates"	Glen Roven & Bruce Vilanch (music & lyrics)	ABC
2000	AFI's 100 Years...100 Stars	"Without You"	Carole Bayer Sager (music); Marvin Hamlisch (lyrics)	CBS
2000	Family Guy ("Peter, Peter, Caviar Eater")	"We Only Live to Kiss Your Ass"	Ron Jones (music); Chris Sheridan (lyrics)	Fox
2000	Freedom Song	"Song of Freedom"	Carole King (music & lyrics)	TNT
2001	Yesterday's Children	"A Dream That Only I Can Know"	Patrick Williams (music & lyrics)	CBS
2001	AFI Life Achievement Award: A Tribute to Barbra Streisand	"On the Way to Becoming Me"	Marvin Hamlisch (music); Alan & Marilyn Bergman (lyrics)	Fox
2001	Dancing in September	"Welcome Back (All My Soulmates)"	Mark Sparks (music); Sy Smith (lyrics)	HBO
2001	Gary & Mike ("New York, New York")	"Mole Folks Song"	Greg O'Connor (music); Fax Bahr, Howard Gewirtz & Adam Small (lyrics)	UPN
2001	Robert Klein: Child in His 50s	"Colonoscopy"	Robert Klein & Bob Stein (music & lyrics)	HBO
2002	Family Guy ("Brian Wallows and Peter's Swallows")	"You've Got a Lot to See"	Walter Murphy (music); Seth MacFarlane (lyrics)	Fox
2002	The Carol Burnett Show: Show Stoppers	"A Mackie Rag"	Ken & Mitzie Welch (music & lyrics)	CBS
2002	The Fairly OddParents ("Christmas Every Day")	"I Wish Every Day Could Be Christmas"	Butch Hartman, Steve Marmel & Guy Moon (music & lyrics)	Nickelodeon
2002	Judging Amy ("Beating the Bounds")	"The Best Kind of Answer"	Peter Himmelman (music & lyrics)	CBS
2002	The Simpsons ("The Old Man and the Key")	"Ode to Branson"	Alf Clausen (music); Jon Vitti (lyrics)	Fox
2003	The Concert for World Children's Day	"Aren't They All Our Children"	David Foster (music); Linda Thompson (lyrics)	ABC
2003	The Fairly OddParents ("Love Struck!")	"It's Great to Be a Guy"	Guy Moon (music); Butch Hartman & Steve Marmel (lyrics)	Nickelodeon
2003	The Fairly OddParents ("Love Struck!")	"What Girls Love"	Moon (music); Scott Fellows, Hartman & Marmel (lyrics)	Nickelodeon
2003	It's a Very Merry Muppet Christmas Movie	"Everyone Matters"	Desmond Child & Davitt Sigerson (music & lyrics)	NBC
2003	The Simpsons ("Dude, Where's My Ranch?")	"Everybody Hates Ned Flanders"	Alf Clausen (music); Ken Keeler & Ian Maxtone-Graham (lyrics)	Fox
2004	Until the Violence Stops	"Because You Are Beautiful"	Toni Childs, Eddy Free & David Ricketts (music); Childs (lyrics)	Lifetime
2004	The Fairly OddParents ("Abra-Catastrophe")	"Wish Come True!"	Guy Moon (music); Butch Hartman & Steve Marmel (lyrics)	Nickelodeon
2004	Futurama ("The Devil's Hands Are Idle Playthings")	"I Want My Hands Back"	Ken Keeler (music & lyrics)	Fox
2004	Sesame Street Presents: The Street We Live On	"The Street We Live On"	Mike Renzi (music); Lou Berger (lyrics)	PBS
2004	The Simpsons ("The President Wore Pearls")	"A Vote for a Winner"	Alf Clausen (music); Dana Gould (lyrics)	Fox
2005	Reefer Madness	"Mary Jane/Mary Lane"	Dan Studney (music); Kevin Murphy (lyrics)	Showtime
2005	Malcolm in the Middle ("Dewey's Opera")	"The Marriage Bed"	Charles Sydnor (music); Eric Kaplan (lyrics)	Fox
2005	The Muppets' Wizard of Oz	"When I'm with You"	Adam Cohen & Michael Giacchino (music); Debra Frank, Steve L. Hayes & Jeannie Lurie (lyrics)	ABC
2005	The Simpsons ("A Star Is Torn")	"Always My Dad"	Alf Clausen (music); Carolyn Omine (lyrics)	Fox
2005	Terror at Home: Domestic Violence in America	"The Tears of the Angels"	Michael Bolton (music & lyrics)	Lifetime
2006	MADtv ("Episode 1111")	"A Wonderfully Normal Day"	Greg O'Connor (composer); Jim Wise (lyricist)	Fox
2006	Gideon's Daughter	"Natasha's Song"	Adrian Johnston (music); Stephen Poliakoff (lyrics)	BBC America
2006	High School Musical	"Breaking Free"	Jamie Houston (music & lyrics)	Disney
2006	High School Musical	"Get'cha Head in the Game"	Greg Cham, Ray Cham & Drew Seeley (music & lyrics)	Disney
2006	Once Upon a Mattress	"That Baby of Mine"	Ken & Mitzie Welch (music & lyrics)	ABC
2007	Saturday Night Live ("Host: Justin Timberlake")	"Dick in a Box"	Katreese Barnes, Asa Taccone, Jorma Taccone & Justin Timberlake (music); Andy Samberg, Akiva Schaffer, J. Taccone & Timberlake (lyrics)	NBC
2007	Family Guy ("Peter's Two Dads")	"My Drunken Irish Dad"	Walter Murphy (music); Danny Smith (lyric)	Fox
2007	MADtv ("Episode 1209")	"Merry Ex-Mas"	Greg O'Connor & Jim Wise (music); Bruce McCoy & Wise (lyrics)	Fox
2007	Scrubs ("My Musical")	"Everything Comes Down to Poo"	Robert Lopez & Jeff Marx (music); Debra Fordham, Lopez & Marx (lyrics)	NBC
2007	Scrubs ("My Musical")	"Guy Love"	Paul F. Perry (music); Fordham & Perry (lyrics)	NBC
2008	Jimmy Kimmel Live! ("The 5th Year Anniversary Show")	"I'm Fucking Matt Damon"	Tony Barbieri, Sal Iacono, Wayne McClammy, Sarah Silverman & Dan Warner (music & lyrics)	ABC
2008	Flight of the Conchords ("Bret Gives Up the Dream")	"Inner City Pressure"	Flight of the Conchords (music); James Bobin & Flight of the Conchords (lyrics)	HBO
2008	Flight of the Conchords ("Sally")	"The Most Beautiful Girl (In the Room)"	Flight of the Conchords (music & lyrics)	HBO
2008	MADtv ("Episode 1305")	"Sad Fitty Cent"	Greg O'Connor, Jordan Peele & Jim Wise (music); Peele (lyrics)	Fox
2008	Phineas and Ferb ("Dude, We're Gettin' the Band Back Together!")	"I Ain't Got Rhythm"	Danny Jacob (music); Robert F. Hughes, Jeff "Swampy" Marsh, Martin Olson & Dan Povenmire (lyrics)	Disney
2009	The 81st Annual Academy Awards	"Hugh Jackman Opening Number"	John Kimbrough, William Ross & Rob Schrab (music); Dan Harmon & Ben Schwartz (lyrics)	ABC
2009	A Colbert Christmas: The Greatest Gift of All!	"There Are Much Worse Things to Believe In"	Adam Schlesinger (music); David Javerbaum (lyrics)	Comedy Central
2009	The 2008 ESPY Awards	"I Love Sports"	Katreese Barnes (music); Alex Baze, Dave Drabik, Jonathan Drubner, Rachel Hamilton, Steve Higgins, Kevin Miller, Justin Timberlake (lyrics)	ESPN
2009	Flight of the Conchords ("Unnatural Love")	"Carol Brown"	James Bobin & Flight of the Conchords (music & lyrics)	HBO
2009	A Muppets Christmas: Letters to Santa	"I Wish I Could Be Santa Claus"	Paul Williams (music & lyrics)	NBC
2009	Saturday Night Live ("Host: Justin Timberlake")	"Motherlover"	Drew Campbell & Asa Taccone (music); The Lonely Island & Timberlake (lyrics)	NBC

=== 2010s ===
Year	Program	Song	Composer / Lyricist	Network
2010	Monk ("Mr. Monk and the End, Part 2")	"When I'm Gone"	Randy Newman (music & lyrics)	USA
2010	Family Guy ("Extra Large Medium")	"Down's Syndrome Girl"	Seth MacFarlane & Walter Murphy (music); MacFarlane (lyrics)	Fox
2010	How I Met Your Mother ("Girls Versus Suits")	"Nothing Suits Me Like a Suit"	Carter Bays & Craig Thomas (music & lyrics)	CBS
2010	Rescue Me ("Disease")	"How Lovely to Be a Vegetable"	Brad Hatfield & Peter Tolan (music); Tolan (lyrics)	FX
2010	Saturday Night Live ("Host: Blake Lively")	"Shy Ronnie"	Rick tha Rular (music); The Lonely Island (lyrics)	NBC
2010	Treme ("I'll Fly Away")	"This City"	Steve Earle (music & lyrics)	HBO
2011	Saturday Night Live ("Host: Justin Timberlake")	"Justin Timberlake Monologue"	Katreese Barnes (music); Seth Meyers, John Mulaney & Justin Timberlake (lyrics)	NBC
2011	Family Guy ("Road to the North Pole")	"Christmastime Is Killing Us"	Ron Jones & Seth MacFarlane (music); MacFarlane & Danny Smith (lyrics)	Fox
2011	Robert Klein: Unfair & Unbalanced	"An American Prayer – Hymn II?"	Robert Klein & Bob Stein (music & lyrics)	HBO
2011	Saturday Night Live ("Host: Jeff Bridges")	"I Just Had Sex"	Jerrod Bettis & DJ Frank E (music); The Lonely Island (lyrics)	NBC
2011	Saturday Night Live ("Host: Tina Fey")	"Jack Sparrow"	Mike Woods (music); The Lonely Island (lyrics)	NBC
2011	Saturday Night Live ("Host: Justin Timberlake")	"3-Way (The Golden Rule)"	The Lonely Island & Timberlake (music & lyrics)	NBC
2012	The 65th Annual Tony Awards	"It's Not Just for Gays Anymore"	Adam Schlesinger (music); David Javerbaum (lyrics)	CBS
2012	The Heart of Christmas	"The Heart of Christmas"	Matthew West (music & lyrics)	GMC
2012	Raising Hope ("Prodigy")	"Welcome Back to Hope"	Matthew W. Thompson (music & lyrics)	Fox
2012	Saturday Night Live ("Host: Jason Segel")	"I Can't Believe I'm Hosting"	Eli Brueggemann (music); Seth Meyers & John Mulaney (lyrics)	NBC
2012	Smash ("Pilot")	"Let Me Be Your Star"	Marc Shaiman & Scott Wittman (music & lyrics)	NBC
2013	The 66th Annual Tony Awards	"If I Had Time"	Adam Schlesinger (music); David Javerbaum (lyrics)	CBS
2013	30 Rock ("Last Lunch")	"Rural Juror"	Jeff Richmond (music); Tina Fey, Richmond & Tracey Wigfield (lyrics)	NBC
2013	Nashville ("I'll Never Get Out of This World Alive")	"Nothing in This World Will Ever Break My Heart Again"	Sarah Jane Buxton & Kate York (music & lyrics)	ABC
2013	The Neighbors ("Sing Like a Larry Bird")	"More or Less the Kind of Thing You May or May Not Possibly See on Broadway"	Alan Menken (music); Glenn Slater (lyrics)	ABC
2013	Smash ("The Bells and Whistles")	"I Heard Your Voice In a Dream"	Andrew McMahon (music & lyrics)	NBC
2013	Smash ("The Parents")	"Hang the Moon"	Marc Shaiman & Scott Wittman (music & lyrics)	NBC
2014	The 67th Annual Tony Awards	"Bigger!"	Tom Kitt (music); Lin-Manuel Miranda (lyrics)	CBS
2014	A Christmas Carol – The Concert	"No Trouble"	Bob Christenson (music); Alisa Hauser (lyrics)	PBS
2014	Key & Peele ("Substitute Teacher #3")	"Les Mis"	Joshua Funk (music); Rebecca Drysdale (lyrics)	Comedy Central
2014	Saturday Night Live ("Host: Jimmy Fallon")	"Home for the Holiday (Twin Bed)"	Eli Bruggemann (music); Aidy Bryant, Chris Kelly, Kate McKinnon & Sarah Schneider (lyrics)	NBC
2014	Sofia the First: The Floating Palace	"Merroway Cove"	John William Kavanaugh (music); Craig Gerber (lyrics)	Disney
2014	Sons of Anarchy ("A Mother's Work")	"Day Is Gone"	Noah Gundersen, Kurt Sutter & Bob Thiele (music & lyrics)	FX
2015	Inside Amy Schumer ("Cool with It")	"Girl You Don't Need Make Up"	Kyle Dunnigan & Jim Roach (music); Dunnigan (lyrics)	Comedy Central
2015	The Comedians ("Celebrity Guest")	"Kiss an Old Man"	Robert Lopez (music); Kristen Anderson-Lopez (lyrics)	FX
2015	Glee ("Dreams Come True")	"This Time"	Darren Criss (music & lyrics)	Fox
2015	How Murray Saved Christmas	"You Gotta Believe"	Walter Murphy (music); Mike Reiss (lyrics)	NBC
2015	The Oscars	"Moving Pictures"	Anderson-Lopez & Lopez (music & lyrics)	ABC
2015	Sons of Anarchy ("Papa's Goods")	"Come Join the Murder"	Bob Thiele, Kurt Sutter & The White Buffalo (music & lyrics)	FX
2016
2016	The Hunting Ground	"Til It Happens to You"	Diane Warren (music & lyrics)	CNN
2016	Crazy Ex-Girlfriend ("I'm Going on a Date with Josh's Friend!")	"Settle for Me"	Adam Schlesinger (music); Rachel Bloom, Jack Dolgen & Schlesinger (lyrics)	The CW
2016	Empire ("A Rose by Any Other Name")	"Good People"	Jim Beanz (music & lyrics)	Fox
2016	Galavant ("A New Season aka Suck It Cancellation Bear")	"A New Season"	Alan Menken (music); Glenn Slater (lyrics)	ABC
2016	Garfunkel and Oates: Trying to Be Special	"Frozen Lullaby"	Garfunkel & Oates (music & lyrics)	Vimeo
2017
2017	13th	"Letter to the Free"	Common, Robert Glasper & Karriem Riggins (music); Common (lyrics)	Netflix
2017	Crazy Ex-Girlfriend ("When Will Josh And His Friend Leave Me Alone?")	"We Tapped That Ass"	Adam Schlesinger (music); Rachel Bloom, Jack Dolgen & Schlesinger (lyrics)	The CW
2017	Duck the Halls: A Mickey Mouse Christmas Special	"Jing-A-Ling-A-Ling"	Christopher Willis (music); Darrick Bachman, Paul Rudish & Willis (lyrics)	Disney
2017	Jimmy Kimmel Live! ("Jessica Chastain/Willie Nelson/Hunter Hayes")	"The Ballad of Claus Jorstad (Devil Stool)"	Gary Greenberg & Jonathan Kimmel (music & lyrics)	ABC
2017	Saturday Night Live ("Host: Casey Affleck")	"Last Christmas"	Eli Brueggemann (music); Chance the Rapper, Will Stephen & Kenan Thompson (lyrics)	NBC
2017	Unbreakable Kimmy Schmidt ("Kimmy’s Roommate Lemonades!")	"Hell No"	Jeff Richmond (music); Tina Fey & Sam Means (lyrics)	Netflix
2018
2018	Saturday Night Live ("Host: Chance the Rapper")	"Come Back Barack"	Eli Brueggemann (music); Chris Redd, Will Stephen & Kenan Thompson (lyrics)	NBC
2018	Big Mouth ("Am I Gay?")	"Totally Gay"	Mark Rivers (music & lyrics)	Netflix
2018	A Christmas Story Live!	"In the Market for a Miracle"	Benj Pasek & Justin Paul (music & lyrics)	Fox
2018	The Good Fight ("Day 450")	"High Crimes and Misdemeanors"	Jonathan Coulton (music & lyrics)	CBS All Access
2018	If You're Not in the Obit, Eat Breakfast	"Just Getting Started"	Dave Grusin (music); Alan & Marilyn Bergman (lyrics)	HBO
2018	Steve Martin & Martin Short: An Evening You Will Forget for the Rest of Your Life	"The Buddy Song"	Steve Martin (music & lyrics)	Netflix
2019
2019	Crazy Ex-Girlfriend ("I Have To Get Out")	"Antidepressants Are So Not a Big Deal"	Rachel Bloom & Adam Schlesinger (music); Bloom, Jack Dolgen & Schlesinger (lyrics)	The CW
2019	Documentary Now! ("Original Cast Album: Co-op")	"Holiday Party (I Did a Little Cocaine Tonight)"	Eli Bolin (music); Seth Meyers & John Mulaney (lyrics)	IFC
2019	Flight of the Conchords: Live in London	"Father & Son"	Flight of the Conchords (music & lyrics)	HBO
2019	Saturday Night Live ("Host: James McAvoy")	"The Upper East Side"	Eli Brueggemann (music); Leslie Jones & Bryan Tucker (lyrics)	NBC
2019	Song of Parkland	"Beautiful Things Can Grow"	Mark Sonnenblick (music); Ashley Paseltiner & Molly Reichard (lyrics)	HBO
2019	The 72nd Annual Tony Awards	"This One's for You"	Sara Bareilles, Josh Groban & Shaina Taub (music & lyrics)	CBS

=== 2020s ===
Year	Program	Song	Composer / Lyricist	Network
2020
2020	Euphoria ("And Salt the Earth Behind You")	"All for Us"	Labrinth (music & lyrics)	HBO
2020	The Black Godfather	"Letter to My Godfather"	Chad Hugo & Pharrell Williams (music & lyrics)	Netflix
2020	Last Week Tonight with John Oliver ("Episode 629")	"Eat Shit, Bob"	David Dabbon (music); Joanna Rothkopf, Jill Twiss & Seena Vali (lyrics)	HBO
2020	Little Fires Everywhere ("Find a Way")	"Build It Up"	Ingrid Michaelson (music & lyrics)	Hulu
2020	The Marvelous Mrs. Maisel ("Strike Up the Band")	"One Less Angel"	Thomas Mizer & Curtis Moore (music & lyrics)	Prime Video
2020	This Is Us ("Strangers")	"Memorized"	Taylor Goldsmith & Siddhartha Khosla (music & lyrics)	NBC
2020	Watchmen ("This Extraordinary Being")	"The Way It Used to Be"	Trent Reznor & Atticus Ross (music & lyrics)	HBO
2021
2021	WandaVision ("Breaking the Fourth Wall")	"Agatha All Along"	Kristen Anderson-Lopez & Robert Lopez (music & lyrics)	Disney+
2021	Bo Burnham: Inside	"Comedy"	Bo Burnham (music & lyrics)	Netflix
2021	The Boys ("The Big Ride")	"Never Truly Vanish"	Christopher Lennertz (music); Lennertz & Michael Saltzman (lyrics)	Prime Video
2021	The Queen's Gambit ("Adjournment")	"I Can't Remember Love"	Anna Hauss & Robert Weinröder (music); William Horberg (lyrics)	Netflix
2021	Soundtrack of Our Lives	"The End Titles"	Marc Shaiman (music & lyrics)	YouTube
2021	Zoey's Extraordinary Playlist ("Zoey's Extraordinary Birthday")	"Crimson Love"	Andrew Hey & Harvey Mason Jr. (music); Lindsey Rosin & Austin Winsberg (lyrics)	NBC
2022
2022	Schmigadoon! ("Schmigadoon!")	"Corn Puddin'"	Cinco Paul (music & lyrics)	Apple TV+
2022	Euphoria ("You Who Cannot See, Think of Those Who Can")	"I'm Tired"	Labrinth (music); Sam Levinson & Zendaya (lyrics)	HBO
2022	Euphoria ("All My Life, My Heart Has Yearned for a Thing I Cannot Name")	"Elliot's Song"	Labrinth (music); Muz & Zendaya (lyrics)	HBO
2022	The Marvelous Mrs. Maisel ("How to Chew Quietly and Influence People")	"Maybe Monica"	Thomas Mizer & Curtis Moore (music & lyrics)	Prime Video
2022	This Is Us ("Day of the Wedding")	"The Forever Now"	Taylor Goldsmith & Siddhartha Khosla (music & lyrics)	NBC
2023
2023	Ted Lasso ("So Long, Farewell")	"A Beautiful Game"	Ed Sheeran, Foy Vance & Max Martin (music & lyrics)	Apple TV+
2023	Ginny & Georgia ("Hark! Darkness Descends!")	"Marriage Is a Dungeon"	Lili Haydn & Ben Bromfield (music & lyrics)	Netflix
2023	The L Word: Generation Q ("Questions for the Universe")	"All About Me"	Heather McIntosh, Taura Stinson & Allyson Newman (music & lyrics)	Showtime
2023	The Marvelous Mrs. Maisel ("Susan")	"Your Personal Trash Man Can"	Curtis Moore & Thomas Mizer (music & lyrics)	Prime Video
2023	Ted Lasso ("Mom City")	"Fought & Lost"	Tom Howe, Jamie Hartman & Sam Ryder (music & lyrics)	Apple TV+
2023	Weird: The Al Yankovic Story	"Now You Know"	"Weird Al" Yankovic (music & lyrics)	The Roku Channel
2024
2024	Only Murders in the Building ("Sitzprobe")	"Which of the Pickwick Triplets Did It?"	Benj Pasek, Justin Paul, Marc Shaiman & Scott Wittman (music & lyrics)	Hulu
2024	Girls5eva ("New York")	"The Medium Time"	Sara Bareilles (music & lyrics)	Netflix
2024	Saturday Night Live ("Host: Maya Rudolph")	"Maya Rudolph Mother's Day Monologue"	Eli Brueggemann (music); Mike DiCenzo, Jake Nordwind, Maya Rudolph & Auguste White (lyrics)	NBC
2024	The Tattooist of Auschwitz ("Episode 6")	"Love Will Survive"	Walter Afanasieff, Kara Talve & Hans Zimmer (music); Charlie Midnight (lyrics)	Peacock
2024	True Detective: Night Country ("Part 5")	"No Use"	John Hawkes (music & lyrics)	HBO
2025
2025	The Boys ("We'll Keep the Red Flag Flying Here")	"Let's Put the Christ Back in Christmas"	Christopher Lennertz (music & lyrics)	Prime Video
2025	Agatha All Along ("Circle Sewn with Fate / Unlock Thy Hidden Gate")	"The Ballad of the Witches' Road"	Kristen Anderson-Lopez & Robert Lopez (music & lyrics)	Disney+
2025	Andor ("Who Are You?")	"We Are the Ghor (Planetary Anthem)"	Nicholas Britell & Tony Gilroy (music & lyrics)	Disney+
2025	SNL50: The Anniversary Special	"Adam Sandler's Song: 50 Years"	Adam Sandler & Dan Bulla (music & lyrics)	NBC
2025	Will & Harper	"Harper and Will Go West"	Sean Douglas & Kristen Wiig (music); Douglas, Josh Greenbaum & Wiig (lyrics)	Netflix
2026
2026	The Pitt ("12:00 P.M.")	"Need Someone"	Andrew Bird & Gavin Brivik (music); Bird (lyrics)	HBO Max
2026	The Boys ("The Frenchman, the Female, and the Man Called Mother's Milk")	"Raise Him Up"	Christopher Lennertz (music); Daveed Diggs & Lennertz (lyrics)	Prime Video
2026	Hacks ("EGOT")	"Mis Figuritas"	Carlos Rafael Rivera & David Stal (music & lyrics)	HBO Max
2026	South Park ("The Crap Out")	"Christian Woman"	Trey Parker (music & lyrics)	Comedy Central
2026	Spider-Noir ("A Mistake I'll Never Make Again")	"The Devil You Know"	Warren Oak Felder, Sebastian Kole & Daniel Pemberton (music & lyrics)	MGM+ / Prime Video
2026	Wednesday ("Woe Me the Money")	"The Dead Dance"	Lady Gaga, Henry Russell Walter & Andrew Watt (music & lyrics)	Netflix

== Multiple wins ==
6 wins

- Larry Grossman
- Buz Kohan

3 wins

- Alan & Marilyn Bergman
- Adam Schlesinger
- Ken Welch
- Mitzie Welch

2 wins

- Katreese Barnes
- Ray Charles
- Alf Clausen
- James Di Pasquale
- Fred Ebb
- Marvin Hamlisch
- David Javerbaum
- John Kander
- Ken Keeler
- John Kimbrough
- Artie Malvin
- Randy Newman
- Justin Timberlake

== Multiple nominations ==
15 nominations

- Buz Kohan

12 nominations

- Earl Brown
- Larry Grossman
- Ken Welch
- Mitzie Welch

9 nominations

- Alf Clausen

7 nominations

- Billy Goldenberg

6 nominations

- Eli Brueggemann
- The Lonely Island
- Adam Schlesinger

5 nominations

- Alan & Marilyn Bergman
- Ray Charles
- Robert Lopez
- Justin Timberlake

4 nominations

- Kristen Anderson-Lopez
- Billy Barnes
- Flight of the Conchords
- Marvin Hamlisch
- Butch Hartman
- Fred Karlin
- Ken Keeler
- Steve Marmel
- Guy Moon
- Walter Murphy
- Greg O'Connor
- Marc Shaiman

3 nominations

- Katreese Barnes
- Rachel Bloom
- Cy Coleman
- Carol Connors
- Dick DeBenedictis
- James Di Pasquale
- Jack Dolgen
- Fred Ebb
- David Javerbaum
- Labrinth
- Christopher Lennertz
- Seth MacFarlane
- Seth Meyers
- Thomas Mizer
- Curtis Moore
- John Mulaney
- Michael Silversher
- Patty Silversher
- Dennis Spiegel
- Patrick Williams
- Jim Wise
- Scott Wittman

2 nominations

- Sara Bareilles
- John Bettis
- James Bobin
- Bruce Broughton
- Steve Dorff
- Bill Dyer
- Tina Fey
- Debra Fordham
- David Foster
- Taylor Goldsmith
- Arthur Hamilton
- Ron Jones
- John Kander
- Siddhartha Khosla
- John Kimbrough
- Robert Klein
- Joseph LoDuca
- Artie Malvin
- Alan Menken
- Nan Schwartz Mishkin
- Mark Mueller
- Randy Newman
- Benj Pasek
- Justin Paul
- Gary Portnoy
- Dory Previn
- Jeff Richmond
- Glenn Slater
- Danny Smith
- Bob Stein
- Will Stephen
- Morton Stevens
- Kurt Sutter
- Asa Taccone
- Bob Thiele
- Kenan Thompson
- Linda Thompson
- Zendaya

== Programs with multiple awards ==
3 wins

- Saturday Night Live

2 wins

- The Carol Burnett Show
- The Simpsons

== Programs with multiple nominations ==
12 nominations

- Saturday Night Live

9 nominations

- The Simpsons

5 nominations

- Family Guy

4 nominations

- The Fairly OddParents

3 nominations

- The Boys
- The Carol Burnett Show
- Crazy Ex-Girlfriend
- Euphoria
- Flight of the Conchords
- MADtv
- The Marvelous Mrs. Maisel
- Smash

2 nominations

- Centennial Olympic Games: Opening Ceremonies
- Cop Rock
- Fame
- Growing Pains
- High School Musical
- Jimmy Kimmel Live!
- Kojak
- Police Woman
- Rowan & Martin's Laugh-In
- Scrubs
- The Sonny & Cher Comedy Hour
- Sons of Anarchy
- Ted Lasso
- This Is Us
- Xena: Warrior Princess
