= Joseph Dougherty =

American television producer

- Born: United States
- Occupations: Producer, writer, director

Joseph Dougherty is an American television producer, writer, and director. He has written for such television series as Thirtysomething, for which he won an Emmy Award and a Humanitas Prize.

Dougherty has also written for Judging Amy, Saving Grace, Pretty Little Liars, and the HBO film Cast a Deadly Spell.

== Stage works ==
- 1971 – Goodbye Bob and Ray – Unproduced
- 1972 – Reading or The Midnight Horror Show – Lolly's Theatre Club, NYC
- 1977 – Denouement – produced under the title Murder for Pleasure – Arena Players Repertory – East Farmingdale, NY
- 1985 – Digby
- 1992–93 – My Favorite Year – Book – Lincoln Center Theater

== Filmography ==
- Zoe Busiek: Wild Card
- Once and Again
- Cast a Deadly Spell (TV movie)
- Steel and Lace
- Tales of the Unexpected (aka Roald Dahl's Tales of the Unexpected)
- Saving Grace (consulting producer)
- Saved (co-executive producer)
- Clubhouse
- Presidio Med
- Georgetown
- Judging Amy (consulting producer)
- Pirates of Silicon Valley
- Hyperion Bay (executive producer)
- Harvey (1996) (TV movie)
- Abandoned and Deceived
- Witch Hunt (1994) (TV film)
- Attack of the 50 Ft. Woman (1953(
- Thirtysomething
- Pretty Little Liars
- Ravenswood
- Belanida (1970, Unproduced)

== Awards and nominations ==
Year	Awarding body	Category	Result	Work	Notes
1991	Emmy Award	Outstanding Drama Series	Nominated	Thirtysomething	Shared with Edward Zwick, Marshall Herskovitz, Scott Winant, Ellen S. Pressman, Richard Kramer, Ann Lewis Hamilton, Lindsley Parsons III
1991	Humanitas Prize	60 Minute Category	Nominated	Thirtysomething episode "Fighting The Cold"	
1990	Emmy Award	Outstanding Writing for a Drama Series	Nominated	Thirtysomething episode "The Go-Between"	
1990	Humanitas Prize	60 Minute Category	Won	Thirtysomething	
1989	Emmy Award	Outstanding Writing for a Drama Series	Won	Thirtysomething episode "First Day/Last Day"	
1989	Humanitas Prize	60 Minute Category	Nominated	Thirtysomething episode "Elliot's Dad"	
