= Ann Lewis Hamilton =

American television producer and writer

Ann Lewis Hamilton is an American television producer and writer. She worked in both capacities on Thirtysomething. She was nominated for two Emmy Awards in 1991 for her work on the show; one for Outstanding Drama Series and one for Outstanding Writing for a Drama Series for her episode "Second Look". She was awarded a Humanitas Prize for her work on the show that year. She went on to work on Party of Five and One Tree Hill. She wrote for Providence and co-wrote episodes of the series with Jennifer M. Johnson. She eventually became a consulting producer for the first season of Grey's Anatomy and won a WGA Award for best new series for her work on the show.

== Television credits ==
- Saved (TV series) (executive consultant - 12 episodes)
- thirtysomething
- The Dead Zone
- Providence (TV series) (executive producer)
- One Tree Hill (TV series) (executive producer)
- C-16: FBI (TV series) (consulting producer)
- Party of Five (TV series) (co-executive producer - 22 episodes)
- Haven (TV series)
- Grey's Anatomy (TV series)
- L.A. Firefighters (TV series)
- The Equalizer (TV series)
- Hard Copy (TV series)

== Awards and nominations ==
Year	Awarding body	Category	Result	Work	Notes
2006	WGA Award	Best Drama Series	Nominated	Grey's Anatomy	Shared with fellow producers Zoanne Clack, Kip Koenig, Stacy McKee, James D. Parriott, Tony Phelan, Joan Rater, Shonda Rhimes, Mimi Schmir, Gabrielle G. Stanton, Krista Vernoff, Harry Werksman and Mark Wilding
2006	WGA Award	Best New Series	Won	Grey's Anatomy	Shared with fellow producers Zoanne Clack, Kip Koenig, Stacy McKee, James D. Parriott, Tony Phelan, Joan Rater, Shonda Rhimes, Mimi Schmir, Gabrielle G. Stanton, Krista Vernoff, Harry Werksman and Mark Wilding
1991	Emmy Award	Outstanding Drama Series	Nominated	Thirtysomething	Shared with fellow producers Edward Zwick, Marshall Herskovitz, Scott Winant, Ellen S. Pressman, Richard Kramer, Joseph Dougherty and Lindsley Parsons
1991	Emmy Award	Outstanding Writing for a Drama Series	Nominated	Thirtysomething episode "Second Look"	
1991	Humanitas Prize	60 Minute Category	Won	Thirtysomething episode "Second Look"	
