= Dennis Spiegel =

American lyricist

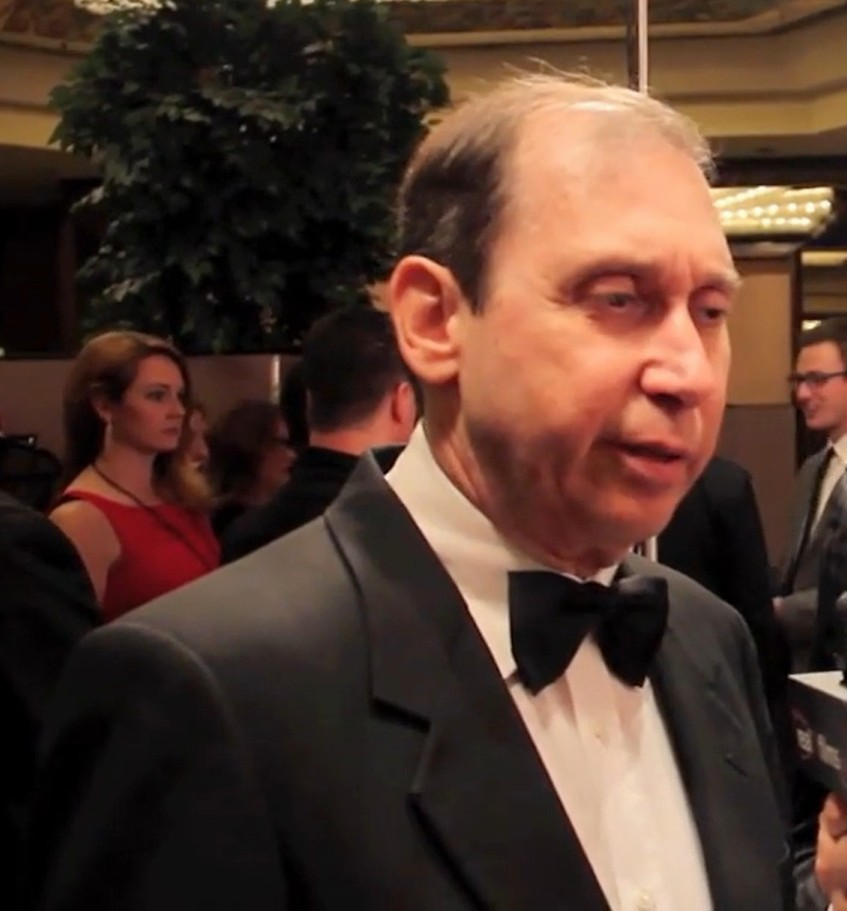
Spiegel in 2014

Dennis Spiegel is an American lyricist. At the 44th Primetime Emmy Awards Spiegel won the award for Outstanding Original Music and Lyrics (shared with composer Curt Sobel) for the song "Why Do I Lie?" from the HBO movie Cast a Deadly Spell. He is a three time Emmy nominee. His film work includes the Michael Caine movie "Blame it on Rio" for which he wrote the lyrics for the song score.

== Academy Award controversy ==
Spiegel's song "Alone yet Not Alone" from the 2013 film of the same name was nominated for an Academy Award for Best Original Song at the 86th Academy Awards, but the nomination was rescinded on January 29, 2014, after the Academy of Motion Picture Arts and Sciences found that the song's co-writer Bruce Broughton, a former governor and current executive committee member of the music branch of the academy, had improperly contacted other branch members. "No matter how well-intentioned the communication, using one's position as a former governor and current executive committee member to personally promote one’s own Oscar submission creates the appearance of an unfair advantage,” said Cheryl Boone Isaacs, Academy President. Not everyone agreed with the academy's actions.
