= Thirtysomething =

American drama television series (1987–1991)

- Main cast
- Genre: Drama
- Created by: Edward Zwick; Marshall Herskovitz
- Showrunners: Edward Zwick; Marshall Herskovitz
- Starring: Ken Olin; Mel Harris; Melanie Mayron; Timothy Busfield; Patricia Wettig; Peter Horton; Polly Draper
- Composers: W. G. Snuffy Walden; Stewart Levin; Jay Gruska
- Country of origin: United States
- Original language: English
- No. of seasons: 4
- No. of episodes: 85 (list of episodes)

Production
- Executive producers: Edward Zwick; Marshall Herskovitz
- Producers: Ann Lewis Hamilton; Joseph Dougherty; Richard Kramer
- Running time: 60 minutes
- Production companies: The Bedford Falls Company; MGM/UA Television Productions

Original release
- Network: ABC
- Release: September 29, 1987 – May 28, 1991

Related
- Once and Again

Thirtysomething is an American drama television series created by Edward Zwick and Marshall Herskovitz for United Artists Television (under MGM/UA Television) and aired on ABC from September 29, 1987, to May 28, 1991.

The series focuses on a group of baby boomers in their thirties who live in Philadelphia, and how they handle the lifestyle that dominated American culture during the 1980s given their involvement in the early 1970s counterculture as young adults. It premiered in the United States on September 29, 1987, and lasted four seasons. It was canceled in May 1991 by mutual agreement between the producers and the network. Zwick and Herskovitz moved on to other projects. The series won 13 Primetime Emmy Awards, out of 41 nominations, and two Golden Globe Awards.

On January 8, 2020, ABC confirmed that a television pilot, which would serve as a sequel to the series, had been ordered. The pilot was never filmed, but was set to be directed by Zwick, written by Zwick and Herskovitz, and have four members of the original cast (Ken Olin, Mel Harris, Timothy Busfield and Patricia Wettig) reprising their roles. In June 2020, ABC passed on the series.

== Plot ==
An ensemble drama, the series revolves around a married couple, Michael Steadman and Hope Murdoch, and their baby, Janie. Michael's cousin is photographer Melissa Steadman, who used to date his college friend Gary Shepherd. Gary eventually marries Susannah. Michael's business partner is Elliot Weston, who has a troubled marriage with his wife Nancy, a painter. Hope's childhood friend is local politician Ellyn Warren.

== Characters ==
- Michael Steadman (Ken Olin) and Hope Murdoch Steadman (Mel Harris): Hope is from Philadelphia, and Michael is from Chicago but remained in the Philadelphia area after graduating from the University of Pennsylvania. Hope is a graduate of Princeton and a consumer affairs writer. After having their daughter Janie, Hope becomes a stay-at-home mother and initially gives up her writing. Later, she returns to work but struggles with her role as a mother in the process. During a difficult period in her marriage when she is pregnant with her second child, Leo, Hope contemplates having an affair with environmentalist John Dunaway (JD Souther). Michael's confrontation with her over this leads them to resolve their problems and rekindle their marriage. Michael is Jewish, and Hope is Christian, and complications from their interfaith marriage recur throughout the series. Michael's original ambition was to be a writer, but he works in advertising with graphic designer Elliot. The men first meet at the Bernstein Fox ad agency and then leave to form The Michael and Elliot Company. When their company goes bankrupt, Michael and Elliot join the advertising corporation DAA, run by Miles Drentell. Michael's relationship with Miles erodes his marriage with Hope, who finally decides to accept a job in Washington, D.C. By the time the show was canceled, Michael had decided to quit work altogether so that Hope could pursue her own interests.
- Elliot Weston (Timothy Busfield) and Nancy Krieger Weston (Patricia Wettig): Elliot studied graphic design at Rhode Island School of Design (RISD). His father Charlie (Eddie Albert) is divorced from Elliot's mother and now lives in California. Elliot's sister Ruthie (played by Meagen Fay), who lives in Philadelphia and is married with two children, has not forgiven their father for leaving them. Elliot works in the advertising business with Michael (initially in their own business, but later for DAA). Nancy was also an art major and is a stay-at-home mother to Ethan and Brittany. Like Hope, she initially feels bored and unhappy in her role as a homemaker. After Elliot has an affair which leads to divorce proceedings, Nancy develops a career as a children's book illustrator and author, and begins teaching at a local art center. Elliot becomes jealous after she also begins to date and finds himself once again attracted to her. Eventually, they rekindle their relationship and stop divorce proceedings. During the final two seasons, Nancy struggles with, but ultimately overcomes, ovarian cancer, which deepens their relationship. Always a rebel, Elliot can never reconcile himself to Miles' preference for Michael and his own loss of creative work at DAA, and eventually quits DAA in a fit of rage against both Miles and Michael. He and Nancy move to California, where he finds his passion in directing and eventually makes up with Michael when they accidentally bump into each other during Michael's job interview at TBWA\Chiat\Day. Michael does not accept the job but briefly entertains the possibility of working again with Elliot to make commercials (and turns again to Miles for help in this endeavor). At the time the show was canceled, it is implied that this venture will not happen after Michael tells Hope that he will stop working so that she can pursue her own interests.
- Melissa Steadman (Melanie Mayron): Michael's cousin and Gary's former girlfriend, who studied photography at New York University (NYU). Her work as a photographer includes the cover of a Carly Simon album and photos in Vanity Fair. Melissa has a complicated relationship with Michael, who is frequently jealous of her career path. She has an equally complicated relationship with her mother, Elaine (Phyllis Newman), and grandmother, Rose (Sylvia Sidney). Her free-spirited sister, budding actress Jill, lives in New York (and is portrayed by Mayron's sister Gale Mayron). In the first season, Melissa dates a divorced gynecologist who has a daughter (played by Kellie Martin) who does not want more children. Melissa later briefly dates Michael's boss Miles; this relationship ends when his intense attraction to her nearly evolves into date rape, which she prevents and for which he apologizes. Miles never really recovers from his infatuation, but Melissa works to avoid him thereafter. Art school-dropout house painter and twenty-something Lee Owens (Corey Parker) becomes the primary focus of her romantic yearnings. They are drawn to each other, but their relationship is fraught with problems, mostly due to the age difference. After Melissa convinces Michael and Elliot to find Lee a job at DAA, the couple begins to drift apart and eventually breaks up. At the time of the show's cancellation, they are on friendly terms again, and Gary's "ghost" (as he recently died in a car accident) tells Michael that Lee and Melissa will marry and have a child.
- Ellyn Warren (Polly Draper): Hope's childhood friend. Ellyn is an important local politician who works at City Hall. Initially dating her co-worker Steve Woodman (Terry Kinney), she later becomes involved with a married man, Jeffrey Milgrom (Richard Gilliland), who leaves his second wife for her but eventually abandons her and goes back to his first wife. After the breakup, Ellyn develops a new friendship with Gary, whom she used to dislike. Annoyed by Michael and Hope's perpetual interference in their lives, Gary and Ellyn play a practical joke on them, implying that they are having an affair. The joke ends when Ellyn reveals she is once again involved with Billy Sidel (Erich Anderson), a comics artist and friend of Michael and Hope's, who set them up on a blind date. Ellyn had dumped him while still seeing Jeffrey, but after they break up she bumps into Billy, and they begin to spend time together. Initially unsettled by Billy's genuine and straightforward manner, Ellyn grows to love him. Afraid of his growing feelings for Ellyn, Billy has a one-night stand with a former girlfriend that temporarily damages his relationship with Ellyn. They eventually work through issues related to fear and trust, and marry in a ceremony at Michael and Hope's house, held after Gary's death.
- Gary Shepherd (Peter Horton) and Susannah Hart (Patricia Kalember): Gary, who first met Michael when they were in the same freshman dorm at University of Pennsylvania, is a free-spirited, womanizing professor of medieval literature at a Philadelphia college, and Melissa's ex-boyfriend. When denied tenure, he thinks about becoming a social worker and meets Susannah, who works for a social welfare nonprofit. Susannah, who later admits to being shy and introverted, is initially an outcast among Gary's friends but develops a working relationship with the group to make Gary happy. Susannah and Gary move in together after she becomes pregnant with Emma and then marry before Susannah moves to New York for a new job. Gary stays in Philadelphia as he has found a new teaching position there that he does not want to give up, even though it requires him to teach American poetry. He falls into the role of a stay-at-home dad after the move and becomes more deeply involved in his new teaching position. He turns to Nancy for help when he is assigned a course in children's literature and does not know what to teach. Among the books Nancy recommends is Through the Looking-Glass, but she no longer owns a copy of it. Gary is on his way to visit Nancy in the hospital with a copy of the book as a gift when he is killed in a car accident. Michael, who initially cannot let go of Gary, is "haunted" by his ghost, who comes back to Michael through a mirror (looking glass). Michael learns to respect Susannah (who stands up to his controlling nature) as they turn to each other to cope with Gary's passing.
- Miles Drentell (David Clennon): Michael and Elliot's corrupt boss at DAA who styles himself as a type of Zen master. Miles is a Vietnam veteran who was once a photographer passionate about art but eventually sold out. By the time Eliot and Michael meet him, Miles is a ruthless and extremely powerful businessman whose complete lack of ethics propels Michael into periods of self-reflection and depression. Michael's internal conflict deepens after Miles promotes him, forcing Michael to also sell out. Clennon reprised this role in the series Once and Again (1999–2002).
- Russell Weller (David Marshall Grant) is a gay friend of Melissa's who met her while she was photographing a wedding. They became fast friends due to their mutual interest in art. His relationship with Peter Montefiore (Peter Frechette) in the 1989 episode "Strangers" was the subject of controversy as five of the show's regular sponsors pulled out of the episode, costing the network approximately $1.5 million in advertising revenue. It eventually led producers to refrain from sexualizing their gay characters.

== History ==
=== Episodes ===
| Season | Episodes | Originally released | |
| Season | Episodes | First released | Last released |
|---|---|---|---|
| 1 | 21 | September 29, 1987 | May 10, 1988 |
| 2 | 17 | December 6, 1988 | May 16, 1989 |
| 3 | 24 | September 19, 1989 | May 22, 1990 |
| 4 | 23 | September 25, 1990 | May 28, 1991 |

=== Nielsen ratings/broadcast history ===
| Season | Timeslot | Rank | Rating |
|---|---|---|---|
| 1) 1987–1988 | Tuesday night at 10:00 pm | #49 | 12.1 |
| 2) 1988–1989 | Tuesday night at 10:00 pm | #41 | 13.9 |
| 3) 1989–1990 | Tuesday night at 10:00 pm | #43 | 12.4 |
| 4) 1990–1991 | Tuesday night at 10:00 pm | #54 | 11.2 |

=== Home media ===
Shout! Factory (under license from MGM) has released all four seasons of Thirtysomething on DVD in Region 1.

Mill Creek Entertainment has rereleased the first season on DVD in two volumes. On January 18, 2011, it released Season One, Volume One, which contains the first 10 episodes of the season. Season One, Volume Two, which contains the remaining 11 episodes, was released on January 10, 2012.

In Region 2, Revelation Films released the first two seasons on DVD in the UK. Season 3 was briefly released in 2014, but was almost immediately withdrawn from sale for unspecified "contractual reasons" and has, to date, not been rereleased, nor has Season 4.

In Region 4, Shock Entertainment has released all 4 seasons on DVD in Australia.

| DVD Name | Ep# | Release dates | | |
| DVD Name | Ep# | Region 1 | Region 2 | Region 4 |
|---|---|---|---|---|
| The Complete First Season | 21 | August 25, 2009 | November 26, 2012 | September 18, 2013 |
| The Complete Second Season | 17 | January 19, 2010 | March 18, 2013 | September 18, 2013 |
| The Complete Third Season | 24 | May 11, 2010 | - | September 18, 2013 |
| The Complete Fourth Season | 23 | November 9, 2010 | - | September 18, 2013 |

== Influences and cultural impact ==
Thirtysomething was influenced by the films Return of the Secaucus 7 (1980) and The Big Chill (1983). The show reflected the angst felt by baby boomers and yuppies in the United States during the 1980s, such as the changing expectations related to masculinity and femininity introduced during the era of second-wave feminism. It also introduced "a new kind of hour-long drama, a series that focused on the domestic and professional lives of a group of young urban professionals, a socio-economic category of increasing interest to the television industry [...] its stylistic and story-line innovations led critics to respect it for being 'as close to the level of an art form as weekly television ever gets,' as the New York Times put it." During its four-year run, Thirtysomething "attracted a cult audience of viewers who strongly identified with one or more of its eight central characters, a circle of friends living in Philadelphia." Even after its cancellation in 1991, it continued to influence television programming, "in everything from the look and sound of certain TV advertisements, to other series with feminine sensibilities and preoccupations with the transition from childhood to maturity (Sisters), to situation comedies about groups of friends who talk all the time (Seinfeld)." The show also influenced the British television series Cold Feet, which featured similar storylines and character types. The creator of Cold Feet wanted his show to be in the mould of successful American TV series like Thirtysomething and Frasier.

Susan Faludi, in her bestseller Backlash (1991), argues that Thirtysomething often reinforced, rather than dismantled, gender stereotypes. She suggests that it exhibited a disdainful attitude toward single, working, and feminist women (Melissa, Ellyn, and Susannah) while at the same time "exalting homemakers" (Hope and Nancy). In this manner, the series was seen as "seemingly progressive but substantially conservative in its construction of reality."

=== Oxford English Dictionary ===
Almost immediately after the introduction of the show, the term "Thirtysomething" became a catchphrase used to designate baby boomers in their thirties. This cultural shift was reinforced by the Oxford English Dictionary, which added "Thirtysomething" in 1993 (under the word "thirty") and defined the term as follows:

Draft additions 1993 - n. [popularized as a catch-phrase by the U.S. television programme thirtysomething, first broadcast in 1987] colloq. (orig. U.S.) an undetermined age between thirty and forty; spec. applied to members of the ‘baby boom’ generation entering their thirties in the mid-1980s; also attrib. or as adj. phr. (hence, characteristic of the tastes and lifestyle of this group).

== Honors and awards ==
While it aired, Thirtysomething was nominated for 41 Primetime Emmy Awards, winning 13. It also won two Golden Globe awards. Later, by 1997, "The Go Between" and "Samurai Ad Man" were listed as number 22 on TV Guide's 100 Greatest Episodes of All Time. Thirtysomething then placed the number 19 spot on TV Guide′s 50 Greatest TV Shows of All Time in 2002, and in 2013, TV Guide placed it as No. 10 in its list of The 60 Greatest Dramas of All Time.

| Year | Association | Category | Recipient | Results | Ref |
|---|---|---|---|---|---|
| 1988 | Casting Society of America | Best Casting for a TV, Dramatic Episodic | (casting director) Judith Holstra (casting director) Marcia Ross | Won | |
| 1988 | Directors Guild of America | Outstanding Directorial Achievement in Dramatic Series – Night | for episode "Pilot" (director) Marshall Herskovitz (unit production manager) Stephen McEveety (first assistant director) Peter Gries (second assistant director) Dawn Easterling | Won | |
| 1988 | Creative Arts Emmy Awards | Outstanding Achievement in Costuming for a Series | for episode "Whose Forest is This?" (men's costume supervisor) Patrick R. Norris (women's costume supervisor) Marjorie K. Chan (men's costumer) Anne Hartley (women's costumer) Julie Glick | Nominated | |
| 1988 | Creative Arts Emmy Awards | Outstanding Achievement in Costuming for a Series | for episode "Pilot" (costume supervisor) Marilyn Matthews (costumer) Patrick R. Norris | Nominated | |
| 1988 | Creative Arts Emmy Awards | Outstanding Achievement in Main Title Theme Music | Stewart Levin; W.G. Snuffy Walden | Nominated | |
| 1988 | Creative Arts Emmy Awards | Outstanding Editing for a Series – Single Camera Production | for episode "Therapy" (editor) Victor Du Bois (editor) Richard Freeman | Nominated | |
| 1988 | Creative Arts Emmy Awards | Outstanding Guest Actress in a Drama Series | for episode "The Parents Are Coming"; Shirley Knight | Won | |
| 1988 | Golden Globes | Best Television Series — Drama | thirtysomething | Nominated | |
| 1988 | Humanitas Prize Awards | 60 Minute Category | Paul Haggis; Marshall Herskovitz | Won | |
| 1988 | People's Choice Awards | Favorite New Television Program — Dramatic | thirtysomething | Won | |
| 1988 | Primetime Emmy Awards | Outstanding Drama Series | (producer) Scott Winant (supervising producer) Paul Haggis (executive producer) Marshall Herskovitz (executive producer) Edward Zwick | Won | |
| 1988 | Primetime Emmy Awards | Outstanding Writing in a Drama Series | for episode "Business as Usual (aka Michael's Father's Death" (writer) Paul Haggis (writer) Marshall Herskovitz | Won | |
| 1988 | Primetime Emmy Awards | Outstanding Supporting Actor in a Drama Series | Timothy Busfield | Nominated | |
| 1988 | Primetime Emmy Awards | Outstanding Supporting Actress in a Drama Series | Polly Draper | Nominated | |
| 1988 | Primetime Emmy Awards | Outstanding Supporting Actress in a Drama Series | Patricia Wettig | Won | |
| 1988 | TCA Awards | Outstanding Achievement in Drama | thirtysomething | Nominated | |
| 1989 | American Cinema Editors Awards | Best Edited Episode from a Television Series | for episode "Accounts Receivable" (editor) Victor Du Bois (editor) Steven Rosenblum | Won | |
| 1989 | Creative Arts Emmy Awards | Outstanding Achievement in Costuming for a Series | for episode "We'll Meet Again" (men's costumer) Patrick R. Norris (women's costumer) Julie Glick | Won | |
| 1989 | Creative Arts Emmy Awards | Outstanding Editing for a Series – Single Camera Production | for episode "First Day/Last Day" (editor) Steven Rosebaum | Won | |
| 1989 | Creative Arts Emmy Awards | Outstanding Achievement in Hairstyling for a Series | for episode "We'll Meet Again" (hairstylist) Carol Pershing | Nominated | |
| 1989 | Creative Arts Emmy Awards | Outstanding Achievement in Special Visual Effects | for episode "Michael Writes A Story" (associate producer) Jeanne Byrd (supervising editor) Victor Du Bois (visual effects artist) Simon Holden (visual effects supervisor) Steve Wyskocil | Nominated | |
| 1989 | Creative Arts Emmy Awards | Outstanding Art Direction for a Series | for episode "Michael Writes A Story" (art director) Brandy Alexander (set director) Mary Ann Biddle | Nominated | |
| 1989 | Creative Arts Emmy Awards | Outstanding Sound Mixing for a Drama Series | for episode "Michael Writes A Story" (music re-recording mixer) Tim Philben (music re-recording mixer) Scott Millan (effects re-recording mixer) Clark Conrad (production mixer) Will Yardbrough | Nominated | |
| 1989 | Creative Arts Emmy Awards | Outstanding Guest Actor in a Drama Series | for episode "The Mike Van Dyke Show"; Jack Gilford | Nominated | |
| 1989 | Directors Guild of America | Outstanding Directorial Achievement in Drama Series – Night | for episode "Michael's Brother" (director) Edward Zwick | Nominated | |
| 1989 | Directors Guild of America | Outstanding Directorial Achievement in Drama Series – Night | for episode "Therapy" (director) Marshall Herskovitz (unit production manager) Lindsley Parsons III (first assistant director) Craig Beaudine (second assistant director) Roger E. Mills | Won | |
| 1989 | Golden Globes | Best Television Series — Drama | thirysomething | Won | |
| 1989 | Humanitas Prize Awards | 60 Minute Category | for episode "In Re: The Marriage Of Weston"; Susan Shiliday | Nominated | |
| 1989 | Humanitas Prize Awards | 60 Minute Category | for episode "Elliot's Dad"; Joseph Dougherty | Nominated | |
| 1989 | Primetime Emmy Awards | Outstanding Drama Series | (executive producer) Marshall Herskovitz (executive producer) Edward Zwick (supervising producer) Scott Winant (producer) Richard Kramer (co-producer) Ellen S. Pressman (coordinating producer) Lindsley Parsons III | Nominated | |
| 1989 | Primetime Emmy Awards | Outstanding Directing in a Drama Series | for episode "We'll Meet Again" (director) Scott Winant | Nominated | |
| 1989 | Primetime Emmy Awards | Outstanding Writing in a Drama Series | for episode "First Day/Last Day" (writer) Joseph Dougherty | Won | |
| 1989 | Primetime Emmy Awards | Outstanding Supporting Actor in a Drama Series | Timothy Busfield | Nominated | |
| 1989 | Primetime Emmy Awards | Outstanding Supporting Actress in a Drama Series | Melanie Mayron | Won | |
| 1989 | TCA Awards | Outstanding Achievement in Drama | thirtysomething | Nominated | |
| 1989 | Viewers for Quality Television Awards | Best Quality Drama Series | thirtysomething | Nominated | |
| 1989 | Writers Guild of America | Episodic Drama | for episode "Nice Work If You Can Get It" (teleplay) Paul Haggis (story) Jean Vallely | Nominated | |
| 1989 | Writers Guild of America | Episodic Drama | for episode "Therapy" (writer) Susan Shilliday | Won | |
| 1989 | Writers Guild of America | Episodic Drama | for episode "Thirtysomething" (writer) Marshall Herskovitz (writer) Edward Zwick | Won | |
| 1989 | Young Artist Awards | Best Young Actor Under Nine Years of Age | Luke Rossi | Nominated | |
| 1990 | Creative Arts Emmy Awards | Outstanding Costuming for a Series | for episode "Strangers" (supervising costumer) Patrick R. Norris (women's costumer) Julie Glick | Nominated | |
| 1990 | Creative Arts Emmy Awards | Outstanding Hairstyling for a Series | for episode "Strangers" (hairstylist) Carol Pershing | Nominated | |
| 1990 | Creative Arts Emmy Awards | Outstanding Art Direction for a Series | for episode "Michael's Campaign" (production designer) Brandy Alexander (set decorator) Mary Ann Biddle | Nominated | |
| 1990 | Creative Arts Emmy Awards | Outstanding Guest Actor in a Drama Series | for episode "Strangers"; Peter Frechette | Nominated | |
| 1990 | Creative Arts Emmy Awards | Outstanding Guest Actress in a Drama Series | for episode "Arizona"; Shirley Knight | Nominated | |
| 1990 | Directors Guild of America | Outstanding Directorial Achievement in Dramatic Series – Night | for episode "Love & Sex" (director) Michael Herskovitz | Nominated | |
| 1990 | GLAAD Media Awards | Outstanding Drama Episode | thirtysomething | Won | |
| 1990 | Golden Globes | Best Television Series — Drama | thirtysomething | Nominated | |
| 1990 | Golden Globes | Best Performance by an Actor in a Television Series — Drama | Ken Olin | Nominated | |
| 1990 | Golden Globes | Best Performance by an Actress in a Television Series — Drama | Mel Harris | Nominated | |
| 1990 | Humanitas Prize Awards | 60 Minute Category | Joseph Dougherty | Won | |
| 1990 | Primetime Emmy Awards | Outstanding Drama Series | (executive producer) Edward Zwick (executive producer) Marshall Herskovitz (supervising producer) Scott Winant (producer) Richard Kramer (co-producer) Ellen S. Pressman (coordinating producer) Lindsley Parsons III | Nominated | |
| 1990 | Primetime Emmy Awards | Outstanding Directing in a Drama Series | for episode "The Go-Between" (director) Scott Winant | Won | |
| 1990 | Primetime Emmy Awards | Outstanding Writing in a Drama Series | for episode "The Go-Between" (writer) Joseph Dougherty | Nominated | |
| 1990 | Primetime Emmy Awards | Outstanding Lead Actress in a Drama Series | Patricia Wettig | Won | |
| 1990 | Primetime Emmy Awards | Outstanding Supporting Actor in a Drama Series | Timothy Busfield | Nominated | |
| 1990 | Primetime Emmy Awards | Outstanding Supporting Actress in a Drama Series | Melanie Mayron | Nominated | |
| 1990 | TCA Awards | Outstanding Achievement in Drama | thirtysomething | Nominated | |
| 1990 | Viewers for Quality Television Awards | Best Quality Drama Series | thirtysomething | Nominated | |
| 1990 | Viewers for Quality Television Awards | Best Actress in a Quality Drama Series | Mel Harris | Nominated | |
| 1990 | Viewers for Quality Television Awards | Best Supporting Actor in a Quality Drama Series | Timothy Busfield | Nominated | |
| 1990 | Viewers for Quality Television Awards | Best Supporting Actress in a Quality Drama Series | Patricia Wettig | Nominated | |
| 1990 | Young Artists Awards | Best Young Actor Supporting Role in a Television Series | Luke Rossi | Nominated | |
| 1991 | American Society of Cinematographers | Outstanding Achievement in Cinematography in Regular Series | for episode "The Go-Between" (cinematographer) Kenneth Zunder | Nominated | |
| 1991 | Creative Arts Emmy Awards | Outstanding Achievement in Costuming for a Series | for episode "A Wedding" (costume supervisor) Patrick R. Norris (women's costume supervisor) Linda Serijan | Won | |
| 1991 | Creative Arts Emmy Awards | Outstanding Guest Actress in a Drama Series | for episode "Sifting The Ashes"; Eileen Brennan | Nominated | |
| 1991 | Directors Guild of America | Outstanding Directorial Achievement in Dramatic Series – Night | for episode "The Go-Between" (director) Scott Winant | Nominated | |
| 1991 | Golden Globes | Best Television Series — Drama | thirtysomething | Nominated | |
| 1991 | Golden Globes | Best Performance by an Actress in a Television Series — Drama | Patricia Wettig | Won | |
| 1991 | Humanitas Prize Awards | 60 Minute Catgegory | for episode "Fighting The Cold"; Joseph Doughterty | Nominated | |
| 1991 | Humanitas Prize Awards | 60 Minute Category | Ann Lewis Hamilton | Won | |
| 1991 | Primetime Emmy Awards | Outstanding Drama Series | (executive producer) Edward Zwick (executive producer) Marshall Herskovitz (supervising producer) Scott Winant (producer) Ellen S. Pressman (producer) Richard Kramer (producer) Ann Lewis Hamilton (producer) Joseph Dougherty (co-producer) Lindsley Parsons III | Nominated | |
| 1991 | Primetime Emmy Awards | Outstanding Writing in a Drama Series | for episode "Second Look" (writer) Ann Lewis Hamilton | Nominated | |
| 1991 | Primetime Emmy Awards | Outstanding Lead Actress in a Drama Series | Patricia Wettig | Won | |
| 1991 | Primetime Emmy Awards | Outstanding Supporting Actor in a Drama Series | Timothy Busfield | Won | |
| 1991 | Primetime Emmy Awards | Outstanding Supporting Actor in a Drama Series | David Clennon | Nominated | |
| 1991 | Primetime Emmy Awards | Outstanding Supporting Actress in a Drama Series | Melanie Mayron | Nominated | |
| 1991 | TCA Awards | Outstanding Achievement in Drama | thirtysomething | Won | |
| 1991 | Viewers for Quality Television Awards | Best Quality Drama Series | thirtysomething | Nominated | |
| 1991 | Viewers for Quality Television Awards | Best Writing in a Quality Drama Series | writers | Nominated | |
| 1991 | Viewers for Quality Television Awards | Best Actor in a Quality Drama Series | Ken Olin | Nominated | |
| 1991 | Viewers for Quality Television Awards | Best Actress in a Quality Drama Series | Patricia Wettig | Nominated | |
| 1991 | Viewers for Quality Television Awards | Best Supporting Actor in a Quality Drama Series | Timothy Busfield | Nominated | |
| 1991 | Viewers for Quality Television Awards | Best Supporting Actress in a Quality Drama Series | Melanie Mayron | Nominated | |
| 1991 | Viewers for Quality Television Awards | Specialty Player | David Clennon | Nominated | |
| 1991 | Writers Guild of America | Episodic Drama | for episode "I'm Nobody, Who Are You?" (writer) Winnie Holzman | Nominated | |
| 1991 | Writers Guild of America | Episodic Drama | for episode "Strangers" (writer) Richard Kramer | Nominated | |
| 1991 | Young Artists Awards | Best Young Actor Starring in a Television Series | Luke Rossi | Nominated | |
| 1992 | Writers Guild of America | Episodic Drama | for episode "Photo Opportunity" (writer) Racelle Rosett Schaefer | Won | |
| 1992 | Writers Guild of America | Episodic Drama | for episode "Guns and Roses" (writer) Liberty Godshall | Nominated | |

== Canceled sequel ==
A sequel to the series, thirtysomething(else), was pitched in September 2019. The pilot was a co-production between MGM Television and Bedford Falls Productions, which was behind the original series, and ABC Studios, and producers were casting its four original main roles at the time of the announcement.

In February 2020, Chris Wood was cast as Leo Steadman, the show's male lead. Over the next few weeks, Odette Annable was cast as Janey Steadman and Patrick Fugit and Auden Thornton as Ethan and Brittany Weston. Melanie Mayron and Polly Draper agreed to appear as Melissa Steadman and Ellyn Warren. On June 29, ABC decided not to move forward with the sequel.
