= Witch Hunt (1994 film) =

1994 film by Paul Schrader

- VHS cover
- Genre: Crime; Fantasy; Mystery
- Written by: Joseph Dougherty
- Directed by: Paul Schrader
- Starring: Dennis Hopper; Penelope Ann Miller; Eric Bogosian; Debi Mazar
- Music by: Angelo Badalamenti
- Country of origin: United States
- Original language: English

Production
- Producers: Gale Anne Hurd; Michael R. Joyce
- Cinematography: Jean-Yves Escoffier
- Editor: Kristina Boden
- Running time: 100 minutes
- Production companies: HBO Pictures; Pacific Western
- Budget: $7 million

Original release
- Network: HBO
- Release: December 10, 1994

Witch Hunt is a 1994 HBO fantasy detective television film directed by Paul Schrader and starring Dennis Hopper, Penelope Ann Miller and Eric Bogosian. The film, written by Joseph Dougherty, is a sequel to the 1991 film Cast a Deadly Spell, with Hopper playing private detective H. Phillip Lovecraft and replacing Fred Ward. Additionally, many characters have different backstories than in Cast a Deadly Spell. For example, Lovecraft refuses to use magic in Cast a Deadly Spell on principle, but in Witch Hunt he refuses because of a bad experience which he has had. The original music score was composed by Angelo Badalamenti.

== Plot ==
In 1953, (Note: This story takes place some five years after the events of Cast a Deadly Spell.) Senator Larson Crockett has led a campaign that managed to make the majority of the country afraid of magic and even outlaw its use. In Los Angeles, private investigator H. Philip Lovecraft is hired by film star Kim Hudson to dig up dirt on her husband, producer N.J. Gotlieb. Gotlieb is about to replace her on his latest film with a young starlet with whom he may be having an affair. In secret, Hypolita Kropotkin (Lovecraft's landlady) works for Gotlieb's film studio as a witch, transporting famous writers from history to the present to improve scripts.

Always beside Gotlieb is warlock Finn Macha, a former private investigator whom Lovecraft knows. When Crocket, Gotlieb, and Macha leave the studio, Lovecraft follows them to a mansion in Los Feliz. Before he can learn what is going on there, an enchanted raven makes him fall asleep with magic. When he wakes up the next morning, everybody seems to be gone.

At the studio, Gotlieb fires Kim, whom he feels only married him because of his wealth and power. Gotlieb is then murdered by magic. The main suspect is Kim. Distressed, she hires Lovecraft to find the killer and prove her innocence.

Lovecraft asks Hypolita for help. She, in turn, recruits two magic users from her coven. One of them senses some of Gotlieb's old memories, which leads them to a beach house. Gotlieb owns the house, and someone used magic to cleanse it of all evidence. Lovecraft returns alone to the Los Feliz mansion, which turns out to be a whorehouse where prostitutes use magic to transform into whatever each client wants.

Lovecraft goes to talk to Kim. He unknowingly interrupts a meeting between her and one of the mansion's sex workers. Startled by Lovecraft, the prostitute uses magic to steal Kim's car and flee. Later, the same woman is found in the river, dead and turned into a mannequin.

While going to see Kim again, Lovecraft stops her from committing suicide. She has been using a charm like the one the sex workers have to become more conventionally attractive and have a better shot at becoming a major movie star. Lovecraft confesses he used magic precisely once: he hid a bottle on a suspect's boat and later retrieved it and "poured" out a conversation that enabled him to close his case. However, his target - Macha - believed the evidence was provided by a woman who had been present and killed her to eliminate her as a witness.

Senator Crockett uses the recent murders to scapegoat Kropotkin in his Anti-Magic crusade. Thanks to newly passed congressional legislation, she is sentenced to death by public burning.

Lovecraft confronts Crockett, who brags about being behind the murders with Macha. Knowing one needs to have a cause to gain attention and political power, and knowing that he could not go against corporations, Crockett had decided to attack the magical community. Now a serious candidate for president, Crockett orders the arrest of both Lovecraft and Macha (whom he no longer needs). Enraged at this double-cross, Macha puts a curse on Crockett.

Before he can set Hypolita on fire, Crockett starts spitting out frogs. His true inner self then bursts out from inside his body, exposing his real intentions and his disdain for his supporters. During the ensuing chaos (in which both Crocketts are arrested), Lovecraft frees Hypolita and they escape, while Macha is nowhere to be found.

Lovecraft then goes to Kim's but finds Macha instead. Macha claims to have kidnapped her, wanting Lovecraft to join him. Macha knows that Lovecraft has the potential to be a powerful warlock. To tempt Lovecraft into using magic, Macha presents a threat: Kim will die if Lovecraft does not use magic to stop him. Hypolita sends her own magic through Lovecraft to incapacitate Macha. Taking advantage of the opportunity, Lovecraft kicks the fallen Macha off a balcony into the sea, where he drowns.

Coming to terms with not becoming a superstar, Kim stops using magic to alter her appearance and decides to leave Hollywood. Before she boards the train for home, Lovecraft kisses her goodbye.

== Cast ==
- Dennis Hopper as Harry Phillip Lovecraft (same initials as Howard Phillips Lovecraft)
- Penelope Ann Miller as Kim Hudson
- Eric Bogosian as Senator Larson Crockett
- Sheryl Lee Ralph as Hypolita Laveau Kropotkin
- Julian Sands as Finn Macha
- Valerie Mahaffey as Trudy
- John Epperson as Vivian Dart (credited as Lypsinka)
- Debi Mazar as The Manicurist
- Alan Rosenberg as N.J. Gotlieb
- Clifton Collins Jr. as Tyrone
- Terry Camilleri as Minister

== Release ==
Witch Hunt had its premiere Locarno International Film Festival in August of 1995. Afterwards, it was broadcast on HBO on December 10, 1994 followed by a home video release on May 9, 1995.

== Reception ==
John J. O'Connor of The New York Times was lukewarm in his response. He wrote, "At the heart of this just about incomprehensible movie is an evil United States Senator (Eric Bogosian) who is campaigning to rid the nation of magic and its practitioners. Somewhere lurks a fuzzy metaphor about McCarthyism," but followed up with "Wonderfully festooned with special effects, "Witch Hunt," directed by Paul Schrader, depicts a Hollywood that is perfectly tawdry and supernatural... As the persistent detective, Mr. Hopper wanders through the film conveying the unmistakable impression that he doesn't have a clue."

== Follow-up ==
Gale Anne Hurd has voiced interest in reviving the character of private detective Harry Philip Lovecraft for a new project, possibly a TV series, and has pitched the idea a number of times. So far, no new Lovecraft film or series has been produced.
