= Strangers (Thirtysomething) =

- Thirtysomething episode
- Russell and Peter after sex
- Episode no.: Season 3 Episode 6
- Directed by: Peter O'Fallon
- Written by: Richard Kramer
- Original air date: November 7, 1989

Episode chronology
← Previous "Legacy"	Next → "Pilgrims"

"Strangers" is a 1989 episode of the television series thirtysomething. The episode contrasts two relationships, one between Melissa Steadman (Melanie Mayron) and Lee Owens (Corey Parker) and the other between Russell Weller (David Marshall Grant) and Peter Montefiore (Peter Frechette). Melissa worries about the age difference between herself and Lee as she is several years older. Russell and Peter are in the very early stages of their relationship and are unsure whether even to attempt to build it. "Strangers" was the sixth episode of season three and originally aired on ABC on November 7, 1989.

"Strangers" generated a great deal of controversy because it depicted two men, Russell and Peter, in bed together after having had sex. Even though the actors were forbidden to touch each other while in bed together, the controversy proved too much for a number of advertisers, who pulled their commercials from the episode. ABC withdrew the episode from rotation for rebroadcast.

In 2005, TV Land included this episode as part of its "Top 100 Most Unexpected Moments in TV History", ranking it #27.

== Plot ==
Melissa and Lee have been seeing each other since Lee painted the interior of Melissa's home. Melissa is nervous about introducing him to her friends because of the several year gap in their ages. Lee is beginning to get upset about not meeting her friends. Hope (Mel Harris) and Michael (Ken Olin) invite the couple for dinner. Melissa accepts, thinking it will be just the four of them. However, all of her friends are there and meet Lee. Melissa has flights of imagination at the party, envisioning her friends gossiping about her with Lee and Lee becoming ever more immature, to the point of imagining him in a baby's bib. She begins to distance herself from Lee, using work as an excuse. Eventually she invites Lee for dinner and contemplates breaking up with him. Lee pre-empts her and breaks up with her first. After several days, Melissa stops by the condominium that Lee is painting. She gives him a set of keys to her place and expresses her concerns about their relationship but tells him that whatever happens, she loves him. Lee tells her that he loves her too and, as she is about to leave, accepts her keys.

Also in this episode, Russell, an artist, is preparing for his first solo gallery show. He meets Peter at the advertising agency that is designing the catalog for the show. They get together at Russell's for dinner and end up sleeping together. In the days following, Russell hesitates to call Peter. Melissa asks him why, and Russell says that (because of the AIDS epidemic), this is a bad time to start forming attachments. Melissa convinces him that there's never a "right time" to start forming attachments. Russell drops off a copy of the catalog for Peter and invites him to the opening.

== Production ==
Openly gay screenwriter Richard Kramer wrote "Strangers", originally including hugging and kissing between Peter and Russell. ABC and the producers agreed to eliminate the physical contact between the men in negotiations. Episode director Peter O'Fallon recalled that the cast and crew anticipated controversy and took pains "to rehearse [the scene] in a normal way, to not make it too provocative or, honestly, too sexual". David Marshall Grant concurred: "We were told that if we touched each other in any way under the covers, that it wouldn't go on the air. Watching the scene, all I see is how completely stiff we were. We were so afraid we might actually touch. But other than that, it was a very typical day. We shot it; it went fine."

== Controversy ==
There was no public outcry about the episode before it aired. Following the broadcast, ABC received around 400 telephone calls with about 90% of them being negative. TV Guide in its "Cheers & Jeers" column gave the episode a "Jeer", saying that having the men have sex on the first date perpetuated negative stereotypes about the promiscuity of gay men. Five of the show's regular sponsors pulled out of the episode, costing the network approximately $1.5 million in advertising revenue. ABC removed the episode from the summer rerun schedule out of fear for additional losses. The controversy surrounding "Strangers" in the late 1980s, along with similar controversies relating to early 1990s episodes of such shows as Picket Fences ("Sugar & Spice") and Roseanne ("Don't Ask, Don't Tell"), led producers to refrain from presenting sexualization of their gay and lesbian characters. As noted by author Ron Becker,

"So viewers got to see Carol and Susan wed on Friends, but they didn't get to see them kiss. And fans of NYPD Blue could hear male hustlers talk about their johns, but the only sex they got to see involved the precinct's straight cops—naked butts and all. Clearly, chastity was the price gay characters paid for admission to prime-time television in the 1990s."

== See also ==
- List of 1980s American television episodes with LGBT themes
