= Curt Sobel =

American composer and music editor (born 1953)

- Birth name: Curt Elliot Sobel
- Born: October 26, 1953 (age 71); Detroit, Michigan, United States
- Genres: Film Score
- Occupation(s): Composer; Music Editor

Curt Elliot Sobel (born October 26, 1953, in Detroit, Michigan) is an American composer and music editor. He won the Primetime Emmy Award for Outstanding Original Music and Lyrics (shared with lyricist Dennis Spiegel) for the song “Why Do I Lie?” from the film by HBO, Cast a Deadly Spell, in August 1992.

His film scores currently include The Flamingo Kid (1984), Alien Nation (1988), Catchfire (1990), Defenseless (1991), A Cool, Dry Place (1998), Body Count (1998), and Tiptoes (2003).

Sobel is a graduate of the University of Michigan and the Berklee College of Music.
