= List of The Carol Burnett Show characters and sketches =

The following is a list of recurring characters and sketches as well as other featured sketches from the CBS comedy and variety show The Carol Burnett Show starring Carol Burnett, Harvey Korman, Vicki Lawrence, Lyle Waggoner and Tim Conway.

== Characters and sketches ==
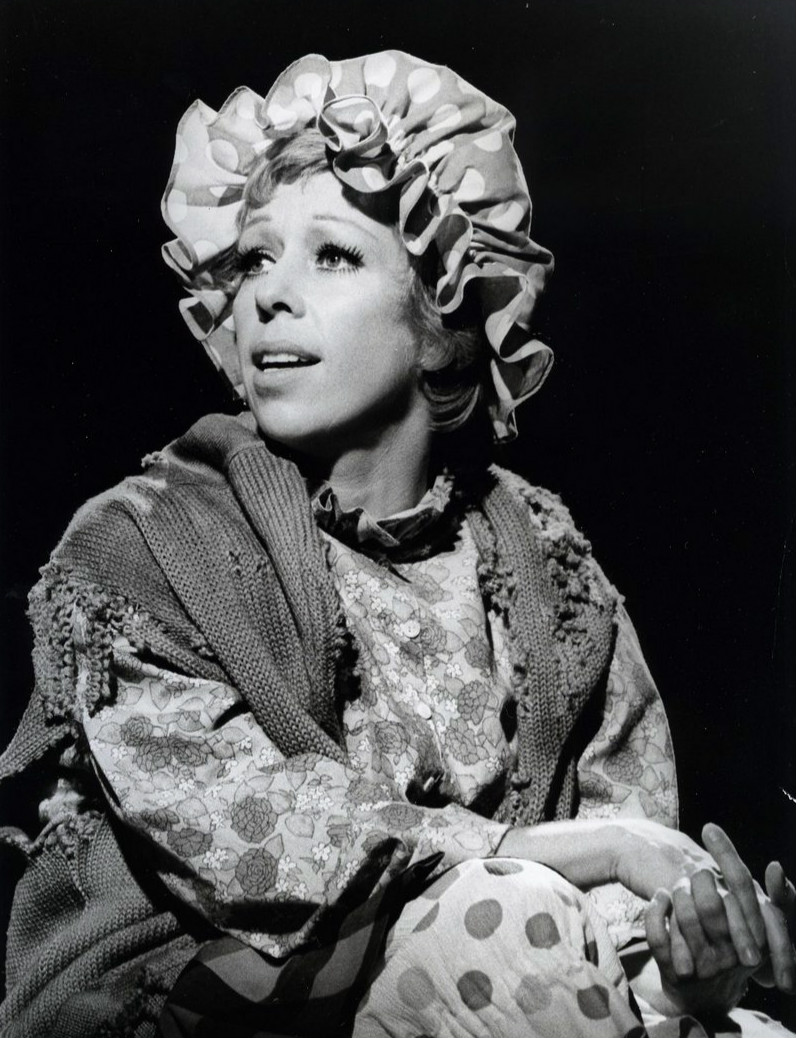
Burnett as the Charwoman

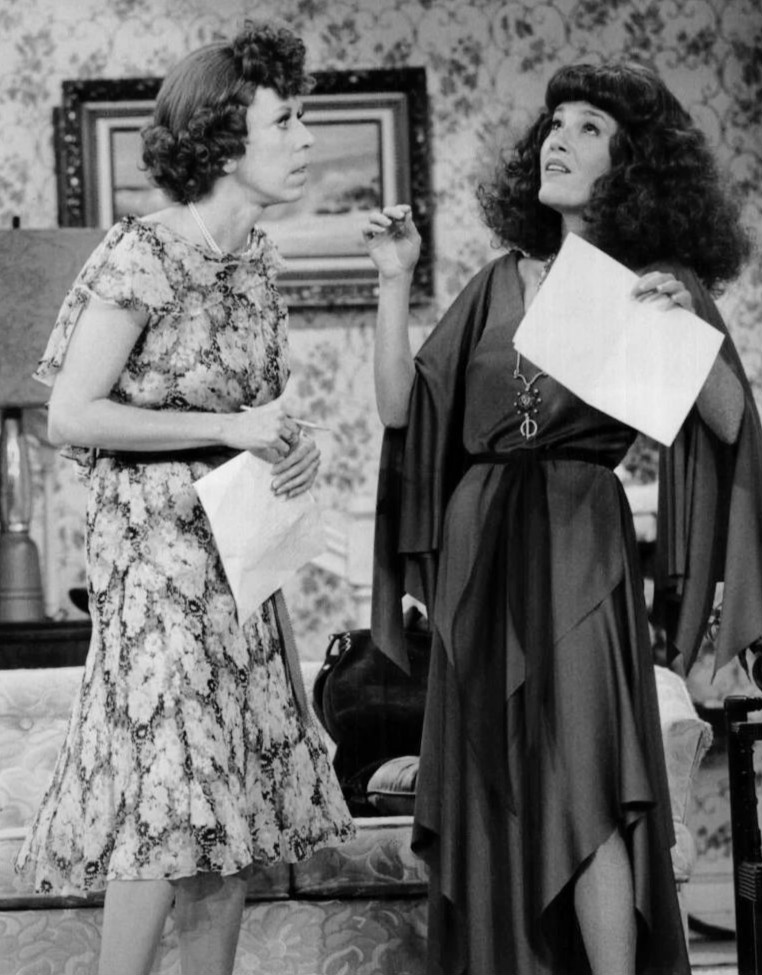
Burnett as Eunice with Madeline Kahn in "The Family" sketch

=== Alice Portnoy ===
Burnett as a little girl who is a member of the Fireside Girls of America, a Girl Scout-type of organization, always trying to blackmail adults into making a contribution to her troop. Lawrence has played her sister Cecily.

=== As the Stomach Turns ===
A soap opera parody taking place in the fictional town of Canoga Falls with Burnett as the main character Marian Clayton. Other recurring residents of Canoga Falls include Conway as different variations of the Oldest Man, Korman as Mother Marcus and Lawrence as Marian's daughter, who always comes home with a baby and hands it over to Marian, who shortly thereafter almost always ensconces it in her umbrella stand. Curiously, the first skit was presented as the final episode of the fictional TV series. The skit frequently parodied shows like The Bionic Woman and movies such as The Godfather, Shampoo, and Close Encounters of the Third Kind.

=== Carol and Sis ===
Burnett as Carol and Lawrence as her sister Chris with Korman as Carol's husband Roger; the sketch was based on Burnett's life in New York raising her kid sister in New York with her first husband, and Lawrence was originally hired just for this sketch. Roger's doting sister Mimi appeared in three installments, each time played by a different actress; the three Mimis were Alice Ghostley, Kay Medford, and Pat Carroll.

=== Charwoman ===
Burnett's signature character, an unnamed charwoman, most often in a musical number, whose animated image has been used in the opening credits, and also in the opening and closing credits of Carol Burnett and Friends.

=== Chiquita/Chiuango ===
Burnett's parody of Charo. In one sketch, Charo herself played Chiquita and Burnett played her mother.

=== The Family ===
Burnett and Korman as Eunice and Ed Higgins, a married couple, with Lawrence portraying Eunice's very difficult mother "Mama" Thelma Harper in the southern city of Raytown. The sketch's original premise featured Eunice's brother Phillip, played by Roddy McDowall, being visited by the family. Later on, other children of Mama's were introduced, including Betty White as Ellen, Alan Alda as Larry and Tommy Smothers as Jack. In addition, Conway played Mickey Hart, Ed's hard-of-hearing business partner. In the eleventh season, after Ed divorced Eunice owing to Korman's departure, Dick van Dyke was introduced as Dan Fogarty, an old friend of Ed's.

=== Fireside Chat ===
Korman and Burnett as the President of the United States and the First Lady (or other political figures), with Lawrence as their daughter. The premise was to parody a "perfect" First Family speaking to the American people, and also included their maid, usually Minerva (played by Isabel Sanford). The skit was dropped when they realized that it was alienating half of the potential audience.

=== George and Zelda ===
Burnett as Zelda, a whiny, nasal-voiced woman and Korman as her husband George. The sketch was inspired by the roles of Montgomery Clift and Shelley Winters in A Place in the Sun Lawrence has occasionally played Zelda's mother.

=== The Ham Actors ===
Having gone through a number of names, the characters eventually became known as "Funt and Mundane," with Korman as Alfred Funt and Burnett as Mundane, two over-the-top actors who run into mishaps on the stage. The sketch started off with Korman as Funt and Burnett as different types of partners. The names Funt and Mundane are take-offs of legendary acting couple Alfred Lunt and Lynn Fontanne.

=== Kitchen Commercials ===
Burnett as a woman who is tortured by television commercial mascots come to life.

=== Mother Marcus ===
Korman as a full-figured, Yiddish grandmother who was based on his own real-life grandmother. She was usually featured in "As the Stomach Turns", but has also been in other sketches such as the grandmother in "La Caperucita Roja", the Mexican version of "Little Red Riding Hood", the fairy godmother in "Cinderella Gets It On!", the disco version of "Cinderella", and the first Mrs. de Wintry in "Rebecky", the take-off of the 1940 film Rebecca.

=== Nora Desmond ===
Burnett as a has-been silent film actress and Korman as her bald, dutiful butler Max. It started with "Sunnyset Boulevard", the take-off of the 1950 film Sunset Boulevard, then continued as its own series of sketches. Gloria Swanson has praised Burnett for the character.

=== The Old Folks ===
Burnett and Korman as Molly and Bert, an elderly couple who sit in rocking chairs on a porch talking about their lives.

=== The Oldest Man ===
Conway as a character introduced as "Gramps," who was given several names, but is best remembered as Duane Toddleberry. He is an old, slow-moving man, usually in various situations involving Korman being annoyed with his lack of speed.

=== The Queen ===
Burnett's parody of Queen Elizabeth II, who made her debut on the interview sketch "V.I.P." Later on she appeared with Korman as her consort, Lawrence turning up various times as both her sister and her daughter, and mostly with Conway as Private Arthur Newberry, a soldier who is completely hollow due to having swallowed a live hand grenade. The premise with Private Newberry was his ridiculous requests, such as asking for animal-flavored ice cream or calling a ship dedicated to him as "HMS Stinky". Lawrence as the princess was once engaged to the hollowed-out private. In time, the Queen and her "King" were rewritten as the rulers of "Freedonia."

=== Shirley Dimple (occasionally Rhoda Dimple) ===
Burnett's parody of Shirley Temple.

=== Stella Toddler ===
Burnett as an elderly woman who always ends up in unfortunate accidents.

=== 10th Avenue Family ===
Burnett and Korman as Stella and Harry, an unemployed and very scruffy married couple, with Waggoner as their 15-year-old biker son Brewster and Lawrence as their overdeveloped 12-year-old daughter Dulcie.

=== Unforgettable Commercials ===
Parodies of well-known commercials of the time featuring the entire cast. This was an annual sketch.

=== V.I.P. ===
Korman as F. Lee Carman, who interviews famous "celebrities", parodied by Burnett, such as Julia Wild (Julia Child), Shirley Dimple (Shirley Temple) and Mae East (Mae West), as well as other guests such as a nudist.

=== Mrs. Wiggins ===
Also known as "Mr. Tudball and Mrs. Wiggins", Conway as Mr. Tudball, a businessman who speaks in a mock Romanian accent, putting up with his empty-headed secretary Mrs. Wiggins played by Burnett; Lawrence occasionally played Mrs. Tudball.

== Movie parodies ==
A regular feature of The Carol Burnett Show was its many movie parody sketches, many of which were written or co-written by Stan Hart, Arnie Kogen and Larry Siegel, all prolific contributors for Mad magazine, with each authoring dozens of the magazine's own movie satires. In the early seasons, the movie take-off would begin as a "Metro Golden Mouth" production with Burnett doing her Tarzan yell as a parody of the MGM Lion. In addition, the show featured shorter movie parody sketches as part of a tribute to a specific studio or director.

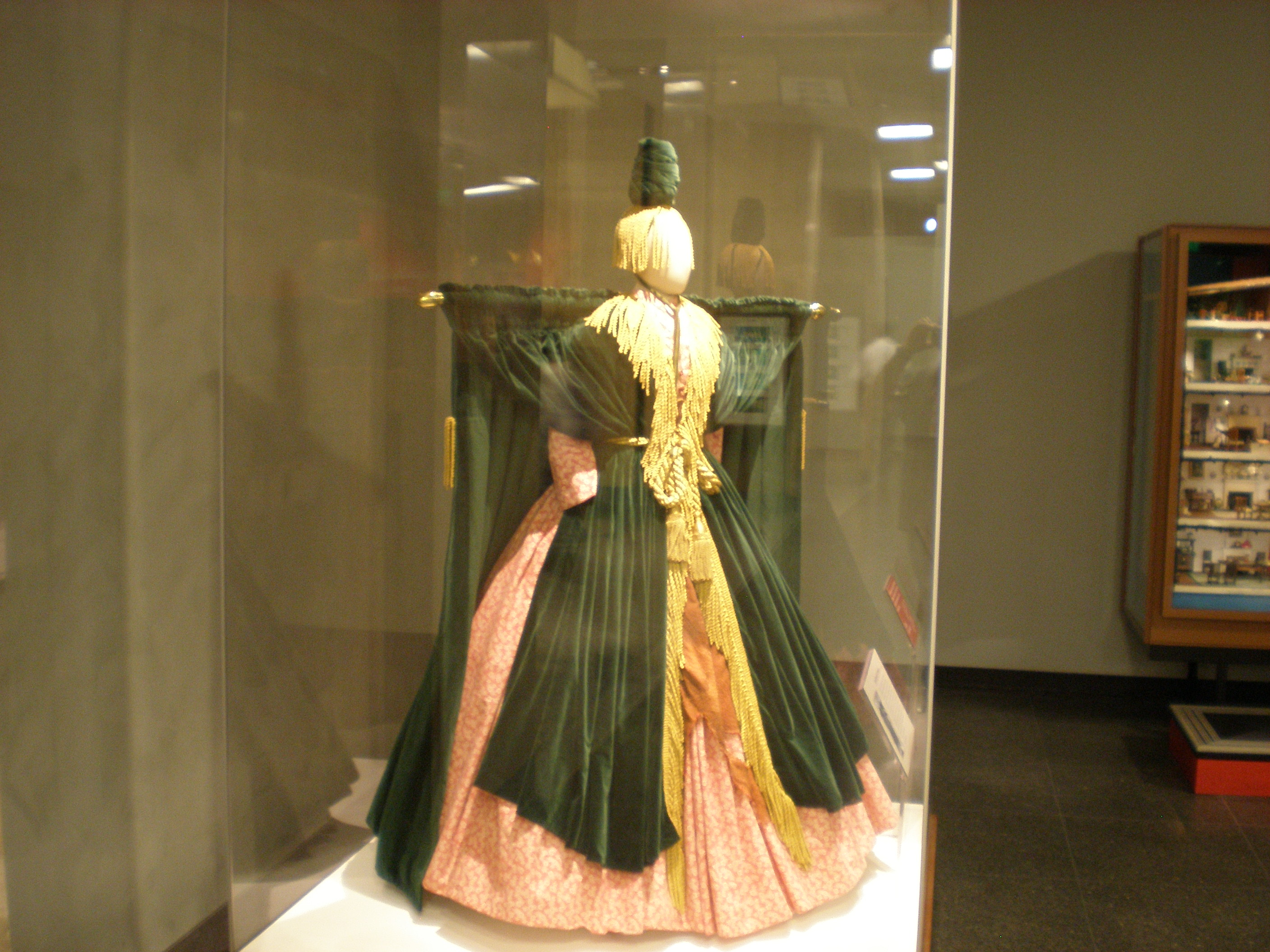
The curtain dress worn by Burnett in the Went with the Wind! sketch

=== Went with the Wind! ===
Perhaps the show's best known movie parody is the 1976 Gone with the Wind sketch entitled "Went with the Wind!" It features the famous scene in which Starlett O'Hara must fashion a gown from window curtains, and Burnett, as Starlett, descends a long staircase wearing the green curtains complete with hanging rod. When Korman as Ratt Butler compliments her "gown", she replies, "Thank you. I saw it in the window and I just couldn't resist it." The outfit, designed by Bob Mackie, is now in the Kennedy Center Honors collection of the Smithsonian Institution's National Museum of American History.

=== Other movie parodies ===
A list of other movie parody sketches on The Carol Burnett Show include:

- "Back Alley" (Back Street)
- "Babes in Barns" (Babes in Arms)
- "Beach Blanket Boo-Boo" (Beach Blanket Bingo)
- "The Boring Twenties" (The Roaring Twenties)
- "Caged Dames" (Caged)
- "Disaster '75" (Airport)
- "Dr. Nose" (Dr. No)
- "The Doily Sisters" (The Dolly Sisters)
- "Double Calamity" (Double Indemnity)
- "The Enchanted Hovel" (The Enchanted Cottage)
- "Fran Sancisco" (San Francisco)
- "From Here to Infinity" (From Here to Eternity)
- "Jowls" (Jaws)
- "The Lady Heir" (The Heiress)
- "The Lavender Pimpernel" (The Scarlet Pimpernel)
- "The Little Foxies" (The Little Foxes)
- "Little Miss Showbiz" (Little Miss Broadway)
- "Lovely Story" (Love Story)
- "Mildred Fierce" (Mildred Pierce)
- "Mr. Schleppington" (Mr. Skeffington)
- "The Murderer Always Rings Twice" (The Postman Always Rings Twice)
- "Natural Velvet" (National Velvet)
- "Naughty Rosemarie" (Rose Marie)
- "The Putrified Forest" (The Petrified Forest)
- "Raised to Be Rotten" (Born to Be Bad)
- "Rancid Harvest" (Random Harvest)
- "Rebecky" (Rebecca)
- "Riverboat" (Show Boat)
- "The Seventh Wail" (The Seventh Veil)
- "Slippery When Wet" (Dangerous When Wet)
- "Some Like It Hotsy Totsy" (Some Like It Hot)
- "So Proudly We Heal" (So Proudly We Hail!)
- "Sunnyset Boulevard" (Sunset Boulevard)
- "A Swiped Life" (A Stolen Life)
- "Torchy Song" (Torch Song)
- "Waterloo Bilge" (Waterloo Bridge)
- "When My Baby Laughs at Me" (When My Baby Smiles at Me)
