= Saved (TV series) =

- Genre: Medical drama
- Created by: David Manson
- Starring: Tom Everett Scott; Omari Hardwick; Elizabeth Reaser; Tracy Vilar; Michael McMillian
- Country of origin: United States
- Original language: English
- No. of seasons: 1
- No. of episodes: 13

Production
- Executive producers: David Manson; David Nevins; Brian Grazer
- Producers: Matthew Carlisle; Stephen Hegyes; Shawn Williamson; Barry Pullman; Tom Everett Scott
- Cinematography: Barry Donlevy; Kramer Morgenthau
- Editors: Peter C. Frank; Lisa Bromwell; Michael Ruscio
- Running time: 44 minutes
- Production companies: Imagine Television; Sarabande Productions; Fox 21

Original release
- Network: TNT
- Release: June 12 – September 4, 2006

Saved is an American medical drama television series, which was broadcast on TNT from June 12 to September 4, 2006. The series was created by David Manson.

The series was premiered on June 12, 2006. The pilot episode, "A Day in the Life", received 5.1 million viewers. The Hollywood Reporter was the first to report that Saved would not be renewed by TNT, followed by various other sources, contradicting reports by the Internet Movie Database that Saved season 2 would begin on TNT with the episode "Epidemic" on March 5, 2007.

== Plot ==
Saved tells the story of Wyatt Cole, a Portland, Oregon, paramedic with a rough past and a history of compulsive gambling. The series follows the ups and downs of Cole's life, from the adrenaline rush he receives from his busy 24-hour shift to the chaotic personal decisions he makes.

== Cast ==
- Tom Everett Scott as Wyatt Cole
- Omari Hardwick as John "Sack" Hallon
- Elizabeth Reaser as Alice Alden, M.D.
- Tracy Vilar as Angela De La Cruz
- Michael McMillian as Harper Sims

== Music ==
The show does not have an opening theme, usually only displaying the show logo briefly a few seconds after the show starts. The rock-oriented soundtrack accompanying the show, music supervised by Gary Calamar, has been well received by critics.

=== Songs featured in TV spots ===
- The Who – "Baba O'Riley"
- Queen featuring David Bowie – "Under Pressure"
- The Fray – "How to Save a Life"
- Mat Kearney – "Nothing to Lose"

== Episodes ==
No.	Title	Directed by	Written by	Original release date
1	"A Day in the Life"	Darnell Martin	David Manson	June 12, 2006
2	"The Lady & the Tiger"	John David Coles	David Manson	June 19, 2006
3	"Living Dead"	Dean White	Joseph Dougherty	June 26, 2006
4	"Fog"	Darnell Martin	Ann Lewis Hamilton	July 3, 2006
5	"Family"	Stephen T. Kay	John Mankiewicz	July 10, 2006
6	"Cowboys & Independents"	Alex Zakrzewski	Kira Arne	July 17, 2006
7	"Who Do You Trust?"	Stephen T. Kay	Barry Pullman	July 24, 2006
8	"Secrets and Lies"	Arvin Brown	Arla Sorkin Manson	July 31, 2006
9	"Triage"	John David Coles	David Manson & John Mankiewicz	August 7, 2006
10	"A Shock to the System"	Dean White	Joseph Dougherty	August 14, 2006
11	"Code Zeros"	Stephen T. Kay	Speed Weed	August 21, 2006
12	"Tango"	John David Coles	Ann Lewis Hamilton	August 28, 2006
13	"Crossroads"	David Manson	John Mankiewicz	September 4, 2006
