= Cinderella Gets It On! =

1975 sketch on The Carol Burnett Show

- The Carol Burnett Show segment
- Episode no.: Season 9 Episode 12 (segment)
- Directed by: Dave Powers
- Written by: Gary Belkin; Roger Beatty

"Cinderella Gets It On!" is a musical comedy sketch featured on the 12th episode of the 9th season of The Carol Burnett Show. It originally aired in the United States on CBS on November 29, 1975, and is an adaptation of Charles Perrault's folk tale Cinderella that is set in the 1970s disco era. The sketch was written by Gary Belkin and Roger Beatty and featured music composed by Arthur Malvin. The sketch was directed by Dave Powers.

== Cast ==
- Carol Burnett as Cinderella
- Tim Conway as Elfin John, a parody of Elton John
- Vicki Lawrence as Cinderella's Stepmother
- Harvey Korman as Cinderella's Fairy Godmother Marcus
- June, Anita, and Ruth Pointer as Cinderella's Stepsisters
- Ernie Anderson as the Narrator and TV Broadcaster

== Plot outline ==
Carol Burnett introduces the sketch saying: "The story of Cinderella has taken many forms. It's been a motion picture by Walt Disney, an opera by Rossini, and a TV musical by Rodgers and Hammerstein. Well, tonight, we'd like to bring you our version of Cinderella: Cinderella Gets It On!"

A title card for the first act reads PLAYBILL and CINDERELLA GETS IT ON under it in the style of a Playbill as a boogie tune begins. It cuts to another card with a cutout video of the stage. The words read SCENE 1 and THE PAD under it. A Narrator introduces the audience into the magical land of the Sunset Strip where Cinderella's "groovy" stepmother and three "funky" stepsisters are singing together in their pad ("When You Got Soul"). The same Narrator then introduces Cinderella, a "square chick" who cleans and cooks for her stepfamily. She announces that she has been waiting for eighteen hours to get four tickets to Elfin John's disco rock concert that evening. Before Cinderella can get one, though, her step-family snatches all four tickets from her. Her step-family then begins to get ready for the concert, making Cinderella do various tasks to help them, while pointing out that she is square and boring ("Dancing At The Disco Tonight"). They leave for the concert and Cinderella is left alone to clean the house. After accidentally sitting on a hand mirror, she begins to wish for a better life ("I Wish"). After hearing someone echo her calls, her Fairy Godmother Marcus magically appears and announces that she is here to make "a miracle" happen for her. She wishes to be a rock superstar and she promises to grant it for her ("If You Wish It"). She creates a Japanese motorcycle for her using two forty-fives and a pumpernickel loaf and also makes a new glamorous outfit for her to wear to the rock concert. She tells her that the magic ends at noon the following day. Cinderella hugs her, and they leave for the concert. A title card reads TO BE CONTINUED.

The scene opens at the start of the rock concert where couples are boogieing to an instrumental version of "When You Got Soul." Cinderella's step-family enters and find dance partners as Elfin John enters the stage and plays the piano with his platform boots ("Dancing At The Disco Tonight (Instrumental)") before throwing the piano bench offstage. He then announces that he will be playing one of his songs "She's Yellow And Built Like A Brick Road." Cinderella enters the party and all eyes turn to her. Her three stepsisters, not realizing it's her, whisper to each other about how cool she looks ("I'm Wishing (Reprise)"). Cinderella's Stepmother goes to get Elfin John's autograph but accidentally rips her dress. Cinderella goes to mend it but is stopped by her Stepmother, asking "What are you doing down there, superstar?" She quickly makes up that she was getting ready to do the new dance, the "Shlump." Elfin John comes over, asking why no one has been listening to his music, then sees Cinderella. She panics, trying to make up the dance, but is saved by Fairy Godmother Marcus, who quickly makes up a dance for everyone to follow ("The Shlump"). They dance until noon when suddenly, Cinderella runs off, leaving her platform heel for him to find her. Back at the pad the next day, Cinderella is back to her square self again, and her step-family are icing their feet from dancing. They are interrupted by a TV newsflash telling them that Elfin John is going around all the houses to find the superstar from the previous night. He shows up at their pad and all four members of Cinderella's step-family try on the shoe, but there is no luck. And although everybody laughs at her, Cinderella goes to try on the shoe ("Ooh, Cinderella"). They suddenly realize that she was the girl from the previous night, but Elfin John is no longer interested. Once again, her Fairy Godmother Marcus saves the day by giving Cinderella a "square" version of Elfin John. Cinderella kisses him as her step-family give her all their funky accessories and do the Shlump ("When You Got Soul (Reprise)").

== Musical numbers ==
Act I

- "When You Got Soul" – Cinderella's Stepfamily
- "Dancing At The Disco Tonight" – Cinderella's Stepfamily
- "I Wish" – Cinderella, Fairy Godmother Marcus
- "If You Wish It" – Fairy Godmother Marcus, Cinderella

Act II

- "Entr'acte" – Band
- "Dancing At The Disco Tonight (Instrumental)" – Elfin John, Band
- "I Wish (Reprise)" – Cinderella's Stepsisters
- "The Shlump" – Fairy Godmother Marcus, Cinderella, Elfin John, Company
- "Ooh Cinderella" – Cinderella's Stepmother
- "When You Got Soul (Reprise)" – Cinderella, Company

== Cultural references ==
Fairy Godmother Marcus is a stereotype of an Eastern European Jewish mother noted by speaking with an accent, wearing costume jewelry, and not looking like the average "fairy godmother" type. "She's Yellow And She's Built Like A Brick Road" is a parody title of Elton John's song "Goodbye Yellow Brick Road." Bob Mackie, costume designer for the sketch, also used several ideas from iconic Elton John outfits for the fictional Elfin John.
