= Lindsley Parsons III =

American film director

- Born: October 18, 1955 (age 69); Los Angeles, California, United States
- Occupation(s): Television director, television producer, film director

Lindsley Parsons III is an American television director, television producer and film director.

Parsons is known for such television series and films as The Secret Life of the American Teenager, 7th Heaven, Thirtysomething, SeaQuest DSV, and Beyond the Poseidon Adventure.
