= Cast a Deadly Spell =

1991 American television film

- Genre: Urban fantasy Comedy thriller
- Written by: Joseph Dougherty
- Directed by: Martin Campbell
- Starring: Fred Ward; Julianne Moore; Clancy Brown; David Warner; Charles Hallahan; Alexandra Powers
- Music by: Curt Sobel
- Country of origin: United States
- Original language: English

Production
- Producers: Gale Anne Hurd; Sam Yohe
- Cinematography: Alexander Gruszynski
- Editor: Dan Rae
- Running time: 96 minutes
- Production companies: HBO Pictures; Pacific Western
- Budget: $6.2 million

Original release
- Network: HBO
- Release: September 7, 1991

Cast a Deadly Spell is a 1991 horror-fantasy detective comedy television film with Fred Ward, Julianne Moore, David Warner, and Clancy Brown. It was directed by Martin Campbell, produced by Gale Anne Hurd, and written by Joseph Dougherty. The original music score was composed by Curt Sobel.

Cast a Deadly Spell combines two disparate genres – film noir detective stories and eldritch tales of the Cthulhu Mythos. It is set in 1948 Los Angeles, in a world where magic is common. A detective is hired to locate a stolen grimoire, the Necronomicon. Several of the people searching for the book intend to use it to summon one of the Old Ones.

A sequel entitled Witch Hunt was released in 1994, with Dennis Hopper playing Ward's role of Harry Philip Lovecraft. (The character's name, as well as a number of plot elements, make reference to the work of weird fiction writer Howard Philips Lovecraft.)

== Plot ==
In an alternative 1948 Los Angeles, magic and mythological creatures are common. The protagonist, Phil Lovecraft, a detective, refuses its use. He does still accept wealthy widower Amos Hackshaw's job offer: Locate the powerful grimoire known as the Necronomicon, which Hackshaw had stolen and which had been stolen from him in turn. Lovecraft meets Hackshaw's cosseted teenage daughter Olivia, whose hobby is hunting unicorns (according to mystical lore, unicorns can only be approached by female virgins.) Hackshaw has chosen Lovecraft for the job because Phil is notorious in Los Angeles for his adamant refusal to use magic in any form.

Following a clue, Lovecraft goes to the Dunwich Nightclub and finds an old girlfriend named Connie Stone performing there as a singer. Here he also meets Harry Bordon, his corrupt former LAPD detective partner, now a cruel mobster who also covets the grimoire. Bordon has already had Mickey Locksteader, who had sold the Necronomicon to Bordon, murdered before he and his girlfriend can leave town; however, both parties had double-crossed each other: Bordon had paid Locksteader with an envelope full of blank paper before having him killed, and Bordon learns (unfortunately too late to stop Locksteader's murder) that Locksteader had given Bordon a counterfeit book full of blank pages.

The next morning, Lovecraft is having breakfast with Olivia at a diner when he is attacked by a magically summoned demon, but escapes. After being questioned and released by the police, he locates Lilly, alias Larry Willis, Locksteader's transgender ex-lover and former Hackshaw chauffeur who had stolen the Necronimicon from Hackshaw, who now has the grimoire. An animated gargoyle bursts in and kills Willis/Lilly, but Lovecraft and Connie (who had followed him) escape with the Necronomicon, only for Connie to betray Lovecraft to Bordon.

Bordon, Connie and Hackshaw (who it turns out had made a deal with Bordon) have plans to use the grimoire to summon one of the Old Ones in order to gain awesome power. The ritual requires the offering-up of a virgin: in this case, Olivia, whose father had gone to great lengths to preserve her virginity. In an unexpected double-cross, Connie shoots and kills Bordon before the ritual begins, but has her gun hand crushed by Hackshaw's zombie bodyguard. Hackshaw summons the Old One and it appears, but unexpectedly rejects Olivia and devours Hackshaw before vanishing back into the Earth. The ritual had failed because Olivia had lost her virginity a few days before to the police detective assigned to guard her.

Connie and Lovecraft share a kiss before she is arrested for murdering Bordon. He leaves with the Necronomicon, confident that the book is safe with him because not only will everyone assume that the book had been either destroyed or repossessed by the Old Ones, but also because everyone knows that he does not and will not use magic.

== Cast ==
- Fred Ward as private detective Harry Philip Lovecraft
- Julianne Moore as Connie Stone
- David Warner as Amos Hackshaw
- Alexandra Powers as Olivia Hackshaw
- Clancy Brown as Harry Bordon
- Charles Hallahan as Detective Morris Bradbury
- Arnetia Walker as Hypolite Kropotkin
- Raymond O'Connor as Tugwell
- Peter Allas as Detective Otto Grimaldi
- Ken Thorley as Mickey Locksteader
- Lee Tergesen as Larry Willis / Lilly Sirwar
- Michael Reid MacKay as Gargoyle
- Curt Sobel as Band Leader

== Production ==
Joseph Dougherty wrote the initial script under the title of Lovecraft which was intended to be filmed with $25 million budget. Once the script became available, it was acquired by HBO Pictures senior vice president Robert Cooper, who then offered it to Gale Anne Hurd to produce. Despite only being given a $6.2 million budget and a strict schedule, Hurd was confident she could get the movie made due to her experience working under Roger Corman at New World Pictures. Hurd hired Martin Campbell having met him in England during her time producing Aliens, and was impressed with his work on the British television drama serial Edge of Darkness, which, like Lovecraft, also dealt with supernatural elements in a realistic setting.

Filming took place between January 14 and March 4, 1991.

Hurd so enjoyed working with director Campbell that she would reteam with him on the 1994 film No Escape.

== Release ==
Cast a Deadly Spell was broadcast on HBO on September 7, 1991 followed by a home video release on December 4, 1991.

== Critical reception ==
In The New York Times John J. O'Connor said that the "new HBO Pictures production that can be seen tonight at 8 on the pay-cable service, gives the city a spin that should make even its most jaded observers sit up, chuckle and wince.... Mining familiar formulas, Mr. Dougherty's Cast a Deadly Spell is engagingly different and special."

In the Chicago Tribune Rick Kogan said, "I've had some very strange times in Los Angeles, spotted some very strange people. But none of what I've done or seen in that town can compare with what happens to H. Phillip Lovecraft in a special effects-filled and wildly successful original Home Box Office movie... Casting its own spell, this movie invigorates."

== Sequel ==
HBO produced a sequel, Witch Hunt, with Dennis Hopper playing Lovecraft in place of Ward. Witch Hunt takes place in the 1950s during the Second Red Scare, with magic substituted for communism. Many characters from Cast a Deadly Spell reappear with different backstories.

== Novelization ==
Rue Morgue announced an upcoming novelization of the film on March 3, 2026. Echo On Publications released a novelization of the movie on September 1, 2026. It was written by horror author Jeremiah Dylan Cook with input from original script writer Joseph Dougherty. In addition to adapting the events of the film, the novelization expands on the world, returns deleted elements, and adds new scenes and sequences.
