= Ellen S. Pressman =

- Occupation(s): Television director and producer
- Years active: 1983–present

Ellen S. Pressman is an American television director and producer.

She began her career as an associate producer on the series Hill Street Blues in 1983. She went on to win an Emmy Award as a member of the L.A. Law production team. She made her directorial debut on Thirtysomething.

Her other directorial credits include Sirens, Missing Persons, My So-Called Life, Party of Five, Arliss, Buffy the Vampire Slayer, Hyperion Bay, Charmed, Felicity, Time of Your Life, Pasadena, American Dreams, Huff, Jack & Bobby, Everwood and Windfall, Riverdale, Once Upon a Time, Life Sentence, Nashville, and ‘’Grand Hotel’’.
