= Richard Kramer (writer) =

American dramatist

Richard Kramer (born April 21, 1952) is an American film and television writer and producer, playwright and novelist. His film and television credits include thirtysomething, Family, My So-Called Life, Nothing Sacred, Once and Again, Queer as Folk and Tales of the City.

Kramer's first stage play, Theater District, was staged in 2002 in Chicago, and won a Joseph Jefferson Award. Kramer published his debut novel, These Things Happen, in 2012. The novel was nominated for a Lambda Literary Award in the Gay Fiction category at the 2013 Lambda Literary Awards.
