= List of China Beach episodes =

China Beach is an American dramatic television series set at a military evacuation hospital during the Vietnam War. The title refers to the Western nickname for My Khe beach, located on the coast of Da Nang, Vietnam. The ABC TV drama aired for four seasons over three years, from 1988 to 1991.

The show's pilot episode, "China Beach," aired on April 26, 1988. The final season was put on hiatus in fall 1990 and did not air its finale until summer 1991. The series ran for 61 episodes, concluding with a two-hour series finale on July 22, 1991.

China Beach was released on DVD in early 2013; its release had been delayed due to expensive music rights.

== Series overview ==
Season	Episodes	Originally released	
Season	Episodes	First released	Last released
Pilot	1	April 26, 1988	
1	6	April 27, 1988	June 8, 1988
2	17	November 30, 1988	May 3, 1989
3	22	September 20, 1989	April 30, 1990
4	16	September 29, 1990	July 22, 1991

== Episodes ==
=== Pilot (1988) ===
Title	Directed by	Written by	Original release date	Rating/share (households)
"China Beach"	Rod Holcomb	John Sacret Young	April 26, 1988	18.0/29
November 23, 1967. U.S. Army nurse Colleen McMurphy begins the last week of her tour of duty in Vietnam with U.S. Air Force pilot Natch Austen making sexual advances toward her. USO singers Georgia and Laurette arrive for a week of events in country. American Red Cross volunteer Cherry White also arrives, looking for her missing brother. She seeks help from a political attaché who attempts to sexually assault her, only to be rescued by Dodger, a U.S. Marine enlisted man who made her uncomfortable with his near silence in their first encounter. Laurette steps into the limelight after Georgia suffers food poisoning and departs early, asking McMurphy to fill in as Georgia’s replacement for a show at The Jet Set in China Beach. Laurette gets a first-hand experience of war triage when the base is bombed mid-show. After her living quarters and most of her possessions are destroyed in the bombing, McMurphy decides to stay at China Beach. This two-hour pilot film was split into two parts in syndication but was restored to a single two-hour episode in the DVD release.

=== Season 1 (1988) ===
No. overall	No. in season	Title	Directed by	Written by	Original release date	Prod. code	Rating/share (households)
1	1	"Home"	Rod Holcomb	William Broyles Jr.	April 27, 1988	186371	15.0/26
McMurphy struggles to overcome her anger treating a pregnant Viet Cong woman who threw a grenade in a bar, seriously injuring Sweetness and killing her friend Dewey on the eve of his departure from Vietnam. McMurphy relents when the woman goes into labor, helping deliver the baby, and the woman, a Viet Cong nurse, saves Sweetness when he struggles to breathe late at night. Meanwhile, Laurette auditions local entertainers to fill her act after she chooses to stay in China Beach and gains a new roommate in McMurphy.
2	2	"Hot Spell"	Beth Hillshafer	Susan Rhinehart	May 4, 1988	186372	12.6/22
A heatwave ripples through China Beach. K.C. agrees to help Cherry look for her brother as she prepares to purchase a priceless vase on the black market. Laurette prepares for a performance singing World War II-era music for a visiting general on Lila’s request. McMurphy shows Cherry the body of an AWOL soldier who was bound and executed in a Da Nang alley, but Cherry is relieved that is not her brother. A mortar attack forces Cherry, K.C., Laurette, Lila, and McMurphy into a bunker, where they share stories of their past and grow closer. Cherry disrupts K.C.’s buy for the vase, which turns out to be a fake.
3	3	"Somewhere Over the Radio"	Rod Holcomb	Ann Donahue	May 11, 1988	186373	14.0/24
Laurette grows closer to Boonie but does not understand his reticence to talk about his experiences in combat. Seeking to understand him better, she fills in for a Red Cross nurse on a trip with Lila and Cherry to visit a legendary Special Forces captain and his unit at a firebase. The three survive a helicopter crash and encounter the captain’s jungle-crazed Special Forces unit, now led by a radio operator who refuses access to the captain and the radio to call for help. While Lila argues with the radio operator to meet the captain, Laurette discovers that not all is as it seems. Dr. Richard, on the eve of his R&R leave, performs a touch-and-go surgical battle to remove a live mortar lodged inside a wounded soldier. He removes the mortar but suffers a head injury as he tries to dispose of the live round. Worried about the women, K.C. calls on Boonie, who musters the strength to join a rescue attempt. Richard departs for R&R with a last-minute gift from K.C.
4	4	"Waiting for Beckett"	Kevin Hooks	Terry McDonell	May 18, 1988	186375	11.9/21
A stressed Beckett tries to get some sleep. Boonie attempts to put him at ease, teaching him to surf and bringing him into town to meet Vietnamese women, but his methods don’t help. A deserter pursued by a determined CID officer tells Cherry he knows her brother and traps her into aiding his escape by securing a passport. Cherry attempts to get a passport from a deceased soldier via Beckett and purchase one on the black market but fails to do so. Beckett finds understanding in Kim, the Vietnamese barmaid at the Jet Set, who shows him her family’s burial ground just outside the base fencing. Previously warned by K.C. and McMurphy that the deserter is tricking her, Cherry traps him in a lie about her brother as the investigator closes in on him. The deserter attempts to escape the investigator but is killed as he runs through a live minefield on the edge of the base.
5	5	"Brothers"	John Sacret Young	Susan Rhinehart & Carol Flint	June 1, 1988	186376	10.5/19
Beckett trains a Black soldier demoted to Graves Registration, meeting another soldier named Fluke who preaches solidarity and brotherhood. However, he finds himself party to a drug-smuggling operation when he discovers the two soldiers are loading body bags with drugs. Dr. Richard returns from R&R despondent and convinced his wife has changed. Dodger gets a lead on locating Cherry’s brother Rick but warns Cherry about following him. She and McMurphy disregard Dodger’s warning, encountering Rick running a Da Nang opium den. He fails to recognize Cherry while in a drug-induced haze. McMurphy returns the next day and admonishes him for driving Cherry to Vietnam to find him. Laurette gets laryngitis on the eve of a big audition with a talent agent. Boonie and Lila attempt to save it by surreptitiously playing a radio recording of Laurette’s singing, only for the audition to go awry when the track slows and speeds at random. Beckett confronts Fluke and refuses to allow the drug smuggling through his morgue. Fluke accepts, as he has found a better deal with a white pilot, but his partner pays the ultimate price.
6	6	"Chao Ong"	Christopher Leitch	S : John Sacret Young; S/T : William Broyles Jr.	June 8, 1988	186374	11.1/20
McMurphy admits her feelings for Natch, and the two get together. However, she gets blamed for a body that disappears on her shift. She is suspended until the soldier reappears, explaining that he had been temporarily paralyzed after eating an exotic fish. Laurette gets a chance for a bigger USO tour when Nancy Sinatra (guest starring as herself) and Johnny Grant (guest starring as himself) come to China Beach. Ignored by Georgia Lee, now a backup singer for Sinatra, and unable to meet with Grant, Laurette plans to build a ladies-only club while McMurphy schemes to give Laurette’s tapes to Grant. Offered a spot on the USO tour, Laurette hesitates to leave Boonie and McMurphy, but she moves on from China Beach after finishing the club for Cherry, K.C., and Lila.

=== Season 2 (1988–89) ===
No. overall	No. in season	Title	Directed by	Written by	Original release date	Prod. code	Viewers (millions)
7	1	"Lost & Found: Part 1"	John Sacret Young	John Sacret Young & William Broyles Jr.	November 30, 1988	186501	19.6
During a general’s visit, Lila is promoted to command of China Beach and is asked to clean up the base and its image. In one of her first steps, she throws K.C. off the base; despite her pleas to the general, she is unable to change his mind. Airman Wayloo Marie Holmes, a former Saigon weather girl and aspiring documentarian, arrives at China Beach to handle her first journalism assignment, extolling the recreational facilities at the base. Cherry trains new American Red Cross volunteers, accompanying them and a USO trio to a firebase. Natch is grounded, leading to McMurphy visiting him at his room at Da Nang Air Force Base and admitting her feelings for him. After spending the night, she discovers Natch is married and angrily departs despite his reveal that he intends on getting a divorce to be with her. Inspired by her trip to the firebase, Cherry gives an impassioned speech about the war during a dinner with the general, causing him to admit she is right and military leadership is struggling to adjust to a new type of war. McMurphy learns that Natch was shot down and is missing in action.
8	2	"Lost & Found: Part 2"	John Sacret Young	John Sacret Young & William Broyles Jr.	December 7, 1988	186502	16.8
McMurphy struggles to hide her grief when Natch is reported MIA. Wayloo Marie is wounded during her assignment when the base is bombed at night and moves in with McMurphy. Pvt. Frankie Bunsen arrives on temporary duty at China Beach. McMurphy returns Natch’s sunglasses to his room at Da Nang Air Force Base and meets his wife, who believed Natch was growing apart from her despite her wish for them to stay together. McMurphy finds Dodger badly wounded outside the base, and she and Dr. Richard save his life. Despite Lila's effort to get rid of her, K.C. is able to stay at China Beach. Beckett leads a memorial honoring soldiers who have died at China Beach. McMurphy prays for the safety of Natch and Dodger, getting a positive sign as a heavily sedated Dodger squeezes her hand.
9	3	"Limbo"	Dan Lerner	Carol Flint	December 14, 1988	186503	16.5
Near comatose, Dodger has visions of his childhood, the moments before his injury in the bush, and McMurphy. Amid a supply shortage, Lila places a lock on the hospital’s medicine cabinet, leading to a scarcity of the penicillin Dodger needs. Lila begins a search to deliver bad news to a Karen on base that her father has died, but is unable to find the right woman. Boonie delivers medical supplies to a village that needs them, but when the shortage prevents him from delivering the penicillin they need, he strikes a deal with K.C. to build her a beauty salon if she gets him black market penicillin. Lila discovers that the Karen she is looking for is K.C., a former U.S. Army secretary who stayed in Vietnam after her tour of duty ended. K.C. is uninterested in returning to the U.S. as her father was abusive to her throughout her childhood. Boonie receives the penicillin for the village from K.C. but discovers the dark side to blackmarket profiteering when a wounded Viet Cong prisoner is brought to the hospital with U.S. penicillin in his possessions. Dodger awakes from his comatose state.
10	4	"X-Mas Chnbch VN '67"	Mimi Leder	John Wells	December 21, 1988	186504	19.1
Dr. Richard hopes to attend a hotly anticipated USO show featuring Bob Hope as Christmas preparations are underway, but he and McMurphy spend 24 hours in triage as a holiday cease-fire fails to materialize. Through a Christmas drawing from his son, he also learns that his wife is seeing another man. The doctors and nurses treat soldiers, orphaned children, a baby chimpanzee, and an armed Santa Claus during the night; a short staff presses Lila into service as a triage nurse. Frankie joins Beckett on temporary duty in Graves Registration. Cherry comforts a soldier whose squadmate dies while waiting for care. Beckett assists Mai, a Vietnamese woman, with the proper burial of her cousin, a major in the ARVN. Boonie surprises everyone with snow. McMurphy and Richard share a moment in his tent, nearly kissing before they are interrupted by the base Christmas party.
11	5	"Women in White"	Sharron Miller	Patricia Green	January 4, 1989	186506	19.8
Dodger is paralyzed by a shrapnel fragment missed during his surgery that has settled on his spine. A neurosurgeon from Johns Hopkins University on a U.S. Army research team (guest star Robin Strasser) unnerves McMurphy when she takes the lead on Dodger’s case and captures Dr. Richard’s attention. Frankie is pressed into service by Boonie as the disc jockey on China Beach’s radio station. Wayloo Marie gets a job as a TV correspondent and films a piece about the women of China Beach, only to have the station manager cut all but the segment featuring K.C. on the beach. After Dodger’s successful surgery, the neurosurgeon tells McMurphy she has the ability to become a doctor but acknowledges the personal sacrifices she had to make to reach her current position.
12	6	"All About E.E.V."	Peter Medak	Lydia Woodward	January 11, 1989	186505	16.7
Lila learns she is going through menopause and worries she’s losing her sex appeal. Seeking a harder-hitting story, Wayloo Marie interviews a Silver Star recipient, only for him to faint during filming. K.C. aspires to buy land in Vietnam for a beachfront resort but lacks the funding. A dashing lieutenant colonel named Edward E. Vincent (guest star Dennis Farina) parachutes into China Beach for some R&R and offers opportunity for all three women: love for Lila, money for K.C., and a riveting story for Wayloo Marie. Vincent, however, uses the same lines on each women and stands them up at a beachside luau. Dr. Richard and McMurphy play an innuendo-laden game of sexual brinksmanship, but McMurphy gets cold feet ahead of their date night and the pair fail to find “neutral turf” to seal the deal. Frankie falls for a soldier (guest star Stephen Baldwin) who thinks he's Chuck Berry and asks her to perform at the Jet Set. After an attempt to pick up McMurphy, Vincent beds Lila.
13	7	"Tet '68"	Steven Dubin	T : John Wells; S/T : Susan Rhinehart	January 25, 1989	186507	14.2
January 30–31, 1968. The Tet Offensive begins. Trapped at a firebase, Cherry comforts a fellow Red Cross “doughnut dolly” and bonds with the two soldiers defending their bunker. McMurphy and K.C. are locked down in the I Corps Headquarters, where McMurphy learns K.C. has been skin-popping heroin and helps her through withdrawal. Beckett visits Mai at her family’s hamlet and is attacked and held captive by Mai’s brother Tran, a Viet Cong soldier. Dr. Richard and a still-recuperating Dodger defend the barricaded hospital, but Dodger unnerves the doctor by estimating the distance of falling shells. Wayloo Marie tries to capture the combat around the base, following Boonie and other soldiers around China Beach. As morning breaks, Boonie clears the hospital barricade to reach Dr. Richard and Dodger. Beckett is released and protects Mai’s hamlet by talking down ARVN soldiers who enter her home. Cherry survives the night at the firebase, but is killed by an explosion as she exits the bunker the next morning. Note: In 1997, TV Guide ranked this episode number 87 on its '100 Greatest Episodes of All Time' list.
14	8	"Cherry"	Mimi Leder	Susan Rhinehart	February 1, 1989	186508	16.4
China Beach reacts to Cherry’s shocking death. Wayloo Marie is troubled by nightmares and her gritty footage of soldiers defending the base during the Tet Offensive is rejected by the TV station. Asked to report on heroism during Tet at a firebase, she is unable to muster the nerve to board the helicopter out. In the wake of the attack, Lila informs the women of China Beach they need to complete firearms training, which Wayloo Marie throws herself into. K.C., still battling heroin withdrawal, reveals to Lila that Cherry's parents have requested that she escort their daughter's body back to Iowa. Warned by Lila not to mar Cherry’s memory and urged by McMurphy to seek help for her addiction, she instead seeks out Cherry’s brother Rick, informing him of Cherry’s death. Rick offers her a month’s supply of heroin for her passport, which would allow him to re-enter the U.S. and escape an inevitable court-martial. Beckett delivers food to Mai’s village and helps repair her home as their relationship deepens. Dodger is scheduled to be sent to Japan to continue his recuperation; he worries he’ll be discharged and sent back to the U.S., while McMurphy tries to hide his file, concerned he’ll be sent back to Vietnam and die in combat. Dodger tells her he wants to fight because of Cherry, while McMurphy unsuccessfully pleads for him not to return. K.C. and McMurphy handle Cherry’s personal effects, and K.C. is touched to find letters where Cherry called her a sister. She decides to escort the body back to Iowa after all and refuses Rick’s deal, urging him to turn himself in and face the consequences to honor Cherry.
15	9	"Crossing the Great Water"	Mimi Leder	Carol Flint	February 8, 1989	186509	12.8
Wayloo Marie makes Dr. Richard the focus of her first “Unsung Heroes” segment, focusing on his volunteer work treating orphaned children in a nearby village. Anticipating an upcoming trip to Japan to repair his marriage, Dr. Richard is instead stunned with divorce papers. Mai informs Beckett she can no longer work at the Jet Set as her village chief requests a fee to allow her free movement. Beckett puts aside his familial reservations about gambling to win the $200 she needs by playing ping pong for cash. Frankie moderates an essay-writing competition on the radio at Boonie’s request. Richard is again pressed into service treating villagers, but a child’s case of bubonic plague proves too much for him to handle. The next day, he returns with medicine to begin treating the villagers, but he is unable to save a young girl suffering from a congenital heart defect. McMurphy tries to come to terms with Dodger’s impending departure to Japan. She accompanies him to Da Nang Air Force Base, where she finds his pistol and he expresses his fears at languishing in a U.S. VA hospital. Before Dodger leaves, McMurphy makes him a deal: she’ll hold onto his pistol while he’s in Japan, but she urges him to leave war behind and not look back.
16	10	"Psywars"	Fred Gerber	Glen Merzer	March 1, 1989	186510	14.5
McMurphy clashes with a visiting Army psychiatrist measuring stress levels in non-combatants at China Beach when she learns he’s been diagnosing injured soldiers suffering from psychosis with combat exhaustion and prescribing them Thorazine to send them back into battle. Unable to sleep for days, McMurphy is troubled by memories of her final words with Natch. With less than a month to go in his tour of duty, Beckett is approached by a recruiter offering incentives to re-up with the Army for three years. Hoping to continue his relationship with Mai after his service, he awkwardly offers to marry her and bring her and her son to the U.S., but she declines. Frankie falls for a handsome African-American soldier (guest star Mykelti Williamson) who turns out to be a womanizer. Wayloo Marie learns that Boonie was the heroic soldier in Dodger’s lost patrol and urges him to tell his story. After Dr. Richard expresses concern for McMurphy, she impulsively joins a helicopter pilot in need of a medic, only to be dropped in a remote clearing because he cannot bring her into a combat zone. Wandering the jungle in wait, she tries to come to terms with Natch’s disappearance; upon her return, Dr. Richard bans her from the hospital until she sleeps. Following a night spent atop China Beach’s water tower, she confides in K.C. her nightmares of Natch’s shootdown, and K.C. relates with the emotions and heroin withdrawal she endured while attending Cherry’s funeral in Iowa.
17	11	"Where the Boys Are"	Michael Rhodes	Alan Brennert	March 8, 1989	186512	16.7
McMurphy awakes on the beach, having slept for nearly 36 hours after Dr. Richard slipped her a sleeping pill, but is still barred from the hospital and ordered to take R&R. She spends it getting closer with 19-year-old soldier Jeff Hyers, but is shocked to learn he is a combat medic. Helping Beckett in the morgue, she discovers most of the deceased soldiers were teenagers and a prom invitation among one’s possessions. Inspired by the bloodied invitation, Boonie and Hyers conspire to throw a prom at the Jet Set. McMurphy joins Hyers at the prom. In a conversation on the beach afterward, Hyers and McMurphy discuss his role sending wounded soldiers for treatment off in medevac helicopters, and he expresses optimism with each closing of the doors; she thanks him for being her “chopper door” that night. A visiting helicopter pilot bets Boonie that Frankie won’t be able to last longer than three minutes on a thrill-inducing flight, but is proven wrong when she enjoys it. At a stopover in a restricted area, he steps on a land mine and loses his legs, devastating Frankie. Wayloo Marie approaches K.C. about Boonie’s heroism, but K.C. warns her about digging too deep into the story, then urges Boonie to take Wayloo Marie’s investigating seriously. During the prom, Boonie is ominously approached by two uniformed officers and led out.
18	12	"Vets"	John Sacret Young	John Wells & John Sacret Young	March 15, 1989	186511	14.0
Actual Vietnam War veterans, including nurses, doctors, American Red Cross and USO volunteers, soldiers, and journalists, give accounts of their experiences. Their interviews are intercut with scenes from previous episodes to show the realism of the show. Specific real-life stories from veterans recounted in the episode that were adapted for the show include Laurette’s comforting of a dying soldier with her photo ("China Beach"), ladies-only latrines at firebases and opulent dinners with womanizing generals ("Lost & Found: Part 1"), Wayloo Marie’s embarrassing injury ("Lost & Found: Part 2"), and military hospital staff treating injured children after shelling ("X-Mas Chnbch VN '67").
19	13	"Twilight"	Michael Fresco	Lydia Woodward	March 22, 1989	186513	15.4
With preparations underway for Boonie’s medal ceremony after Wayloo Marie’s reporting of his heroism, Boonie is subjected to days of questioning by military investigators on what happened during his lost patrol. Wayloo Marie’s father, a sitting Congressman (guest star Kevin McCarthy) visits China Beach, causing old resentments to rise again. K.C. gives Boonie cash and a passport, urging him to leave before the truth of his patrol is discovered. Dodger returns to China Beach after recuperating in Japan and McMurphy returns his pistol. Frankie bonds with Sweetness, brought in for the ceremony from a military jail after deserting. Flashbacks show that Boonie, Dodger, Sweetness, and radioman Whiplash were led on a covert mission along the Ho Chi Minh Trail by Bellows, a CIA agent who suffocates Whiplash when he steps on a booby trap. After telling the investigators he believed the patrol was lost, Boonie reveals to them he knew they were in Laos, not Vietnam. In his flashbacks, Boonie and the other soldiers were deeply troubled by Bellows‘s indiscriminate killing of women and children in the jungle. When Bellows tries to kill a child running from the patrol, Boonie kills Bellows, and the three surviving men decide to cover up the truth of the events. Wayloo Marie is questioned by the investigators and prods Boonie, Dodger, and Sweetness for the real story, but the men refuse to tell her and she tries to get the medal ceremony called off. Boonie learns that the investigators were only concerned about covering up the patrol’s presence in Laos and is awarded the Navy Cross, which he accepts with mixed emotions. Dodger returns to combat.
20	14	"Afterburner"	Christopher Leitch	Carol Flint	April 5, 1989	186514	16.7
McMurphy is stunned when Natch reappears six months after his shootdown with another POW, having survived and escaped a Viet Cong jungle prison camp. Natch tells her he wants to divorce his wife and continue his tour to be with McMurphy, but is shocked to discover that his wife is pregnant. He initially keeps the information from McMurphy, only for his talkative POW friend to inadvertently reveal it to her. Meanwhile, Lila cares for an injured soldier’s pet leopard cub and bonds with the animal before it is shipped to the U.S. After requesting an assistant for the Jet Set, Boonie is instead assigned a new boss, a sergeant in the employ of a mysterious black market businessman named Turner. The sergeant adds slot machines to the bar and tries to broker a deal with K.C. to run the profits through her salon. When Turner visits China Beach, Boonie informs him the sergeant is skimming profits, causing the sergeant to be transferred and Boonie to smash the slots. Turner visits K.C., who was once employed as a prostitute by his organization, and offers her a business role in Bangkok that she declines. Before Natch leaves, McMurphy tells him they can no longer speak and need to move on. Later, she and K.C. burn memories of Natch and Turner on the beach.
21	15	"Promised Land"	Michael Rhodes	Patricia Green	April 12, 1989	186515	15.7
April 4, 1968. On his last day in Vietnam, Beckett leaves a Bible with McMurphy and shares a tearful goodbye with Mai. At the airfield, he decides not to board the plane back to the U.S. and reunited with Mai at the Jet Set just as news of Martin Luther King Jr.’s murder reaches China Beach. He joins Frankie and a unit of Black soldiers on leave in mourning Dr. King. However, the Jet Set is shut down when they clash with rowdy group of racist white soldiers. The Black soldiers relocate to their own section of the base, the “Promised Land” occupied by Fluke, but they refuse to join his illicit activities when he admits he sells to white soldiers. Taunted by racist displays from the white soldiers, a brawl breaks out between units, causing Lila to end their R&R early. Still struggling with the dissolution of his marriage, Dr. Richard agrees to a date with Wayloo Marie, who is warned by McMurphy not to hurt the doctor. When one of the white soldiers is killed in combat after their early end to R&R, their unit leader personally blames Beckett. He kills Fluke and destroys the Promised Land. When the Black soldiers capture him and intend to kill him in retribution, Beckett talks them down and urges them to seek justice through the military legal system. Beckett re-enlists, joining Mai and her son at their village before he’s required to return to China Beach.
22	16	"The World: Part 1"	John Sacret Young	John Wells	April 26, 1989	186516	16.7
China Beach sends off Wayloo Marie, returning to the U.S. for a job at the ABC news network in New York City. She gets an unexpected traveling companion in McMurphy, headed home to Lawrence, Kansas for the first time in 16 months after her estranged, alcoholic father (guest star Donald Moffat) suffers a heart attack. The two leave Vietnam with declarations of love from Dr. Richard and return to a changed U.S., greeted with eggs thrown by anti-war protesters. The women share a final Vietnamese beer, smuggled in Wayloo Marie’s luggage, before going their separate ways. McMurphy returns to Lawrence and immediately clashes with her mother, who criticizes her hair and throws away her clothes from China Beach. She reconnects with brother Brendan, who is similarly estranged from their father but lacked the courage to leave Lawrence like his sister. McMurphy saves her father when he suffers a second heart attack, whispering he cannot die before she has a chance to tell him off for a difficult upbringing. The next night, when he sneaks away from the hospital, she and Brendan find him at a train station; there, he mistakes McMurphy for a daughter, Molly, who died in infancy, again despairs over McMurphy’s tour in Vietnam, and shares a final dance with her.
23	17	"The World: Part 2"	John Sacret Young	John Wells	May 3, 1989	186517	16.1
McMurphy’s father dies. At the cemetery after his funeral, McMurphy tearfully witnesses a Marine’s funeral. She has a difficult conversation with her mother, who reveals her father, never religious in adulthood, went to church daily and refused to answer the door in the year-plus McMurphy was in Vietnam, worried about the possibility of her dying. McMurphy tells her mother she was “never going to be who you want me to be” and refuses to settle for life as a nun or a conventional housewife as her mother wants. McMurphy and her brother sneak back into the cemetery that night, where she wishes that she could have her father, her sister Molly, and the dying soldiers she’s treated back from the dead. On the tarmac boarding her flight back to Vietnam, she has a change of heart and risks going AWOL to visit Jan (guest star Kathy Bates), a nurse who was stationed with her in Vietnam and is now a nurse at an Army hospital for recovering amputees in San Francisco. She joins Jan and two wheelchair-using veterans at a bar, where the two soldiers argue with two political science college students about the Vietnam War. McMurphy recalls the brutality and the camaraderie of her experiences in country before sharing an intimate dance with one of the vets. Still wavering on returning to Vietnam, McMurphy meets a wounded soldier at the hospital who recognizes her from China Beach (seen in “Psywars”). She decides to return to Vietnam and leaves with him a necklace of St. Jude her father had given her before she originally departed for her tour. The soldiers give her an ovation as she departs; upon landing at China Beach, littered with wounded troops, she immediately gets to treating one and tells him he’s going to be okay.

=== Season 3 (1989–90) ===
No. overall	No. in season	Title	Directed by	Written by	Original release date	Prod. code	Viewers (millions)
24	1	"The Unquiet Earth"	Michael Rhodes	Alan Brennert	September 20, 1989	186803	19.9
When K.C.’s living quarters in an old church aboard China Beach are bombed, she calls on a colonel to order quick repairs and wrangles McMurphy into joining her for a date with the colonel at Da Nang Air Force Base. En route to the base, their Jeep is sabotaged and the women are kidnapped by the Viet Cong and taken into underground tunnels. There, McMurphy is ordered by a VC operative and translator named Tran (Mai's brother; the same Viet Cong operative who held Beckett captive in the Season 2 episode "Tet '68") to operate on a VC elder with a sucking chest wound with crude tools fashioned from scavenged military supplies. She agrees to perform the operation as long as K.C. is kept safe, but K.C. tries to escape during a bombing and is imprisoned. McMurphy runs into further complications when power is knocked out, causing her to operate by candlelight. Reunited with K.C., she compares the spirit of the tunnel residents holding vigil over the elder with her own experience with her father’s death, admitting that he died alone when she and her mother left the hospital one night. When the elder requires a blood transfusion, McMurphy calls on universal donor K.C. to give blood. Despite the successful surgery and transfusion, the two women are led off to be executed by Tran, but he has a change of heart and does not kill the women. Another bombing opens a potential escape route and the two women swim through an underwater tunnel to freedom, exiting just outside the fencing at China Beach.
25	2	"Skin Deep"	Mimi Leder	Carol Flint	September 27, 1989	186801	19.4
When a visit by Miss America falls through, new Red Cross volunteer Holly Pelegrino coaxes the women of China Beach to participate in a beauty pageant. Frankie is reassigned to the motor pool, where she clashes with bigoted Sarge Pepper. In the ward, McMurphy and the hospital staff struggle to calm a suicidal soldier (guest star Carlos Gómez) who suffered severe facial wounds from a Bouncing Betty. When she finds out Gaspar is from Kansas City, she pays K.C. to visit him and help him adjust to his injuries. Through their conversations, K.C. learns that Gaspar is enraged to have left behind a promising baseball career stateside to enlist in the military. With little guidance from Sarge Pepper, Frankie washes the vehicles in the motor pool (to a rendition of “Don't Make Me Over”), drawing his ire as the freshly cleaned trucks make easy targets. She misses the pageant fixing her mistake and repairing a Jeep without help, but slams Sarge Pepper in a raucous stand-up set and performance of “My Guy” to signal she has no intentions of leaving her assignment. Gaspar approaches K.C. at her salon, smashing a mirror and threatening her with a shard of glass. She goads him into following through, disarming him, and the two share a moment of catharsis that ends with K.C. removing his bandages so she and Gaspar can see the full extent of his facial disfigurement.
26	3	"Dear China Beach"	Michael Rhodes	John Wells	October 4, 1989	186802	18.9
McMurphy wins a drinking contest that ends with her and her competitor eating exotic foods from a pig’s head. She and Frankie are forced to find new housing with the other women of China Beach when their living quarters are bombed in a mortar attack. Across the base, Holly farms out letters from an elementary school in Colorado, asking them to respond to the students. McMurphy contracts acute parasitic dysentery from the exotic food, leaving her bedridden in the hospital ward. To her embarrassment, she is examined by a French doctor, Gerard Bernard (guest star Derek de Lint), who she previously met briefly while treating villagers (shown in “The Unquiet Earth”). Meanwhile, Dodger returns to China Beach after an extended stay at a firebase and is approached by a Vietnamese orphan with an Amerasian baby she claims is his. Dodger refuses to acknowledge the baby might be his as he remembers going AWOL in Da Nang for one night with a local prostitute, but is troubled by the appearance of her son after he learns that the prostitute died during the childbirth. His absence forces Boonie and Hyers to take the baby to the orphanage by themselves. There, they discover the girl brought him to China Beach in the hopes he’d escape death at the orphanage, which lost several babies in an outbreak of yellow fever. McMurphy finally musters the strength to leave her hospital bed to use the latrine and is given a golden toilet seat as a milestone get-well gift. Boonie tracks down Dodger in Da Nang, where he is still unable to cope with his recent experiences in the bush and news of his son. Dodger visits the orphanage, but Dr. Bernard’s questioning about parental responsibility drives him away. He heads back to the bush but has a change of heart upon returning to China Beach, running to the orphanage to hold his son for the first time.
27	4	"Who's Happy Now?"	Fred Gerber	Lydia Woodward	October 11, 1989	186804	20.0
Dr. Richard finds a drinking buddy in a corporal who is the son of a doctor, but he is forced to perform a craniotomy on the corporal when he falls from the base’s water tower. The surgery to relieve the pressure on his brain leaves him in a childlike state behaviorally, causing Dr. Richard to feel guilty about performing the procedure and reminding him of his young son. U.S. Army Col. Darling (guest star R. Lee Ermey) visits China Beach to evaluate Lila for a potential promotion, where he is immediately enraged by a sardonic Dr. Richard. Lila apologizes for his behavior, trying to level with him by recalling service overseas during World War II, but Darling rebuffs her and tells her all of his military service to that point was spent in the U.S. During a night with K.C., he suffers a fatal heart attack, leading her, Boonie, and Hyers to scheme of ways to plant his dead body without drawing attention to K.C. Infatuated by Lila, Sarge Pepper seeks counsel from Frankie on how to catch her eye. Lila comes to him in need of a Jeep to search for Darling and stressed about the possible promotion, only for Sarge to impulsively kiss her. Lila later visits him at the motor pool, asking him not to tell anyone about the kiss, but the two end up in bed together. McMurphy is asked to dinner by Dr. Bernard, but she turns him down. Richard snaps on the corporal when he can’t find a missing body (that of Darling, who Boonie and Hyers had left in the operating room), leading McMurphy to slap him to stop his rage. Out of options to stage Darling’s death like an accident, K.C., Boonie, and Hyers finally bring his body to Beckett, where Beckett finds a letter in Darling’s possession denying him a final opportunity to serve in combat for health reasons. The four pin medals to his uniform before sending him off with a final salute. Richard returns to apologize to the corporal and instead gives a tearful speech directed to his son about the moments he’s missed while in Vietnam.
28	5	"Independence Day"	Mimi Leder	Susan Rhinehart	October 25, 1989	186806	18.0
On a rainy 4th of July 1968, McMurphy is soaked by a Jeep driven by Sgt. Vinnie Ventresca (guest star Tom Sizemore), a dog handler who harbors a huge crush for her. After her shift, she is approached by Dr. Bernard, who invites her to dinner at his home. However, she worries they are incompatible because of his disdain for American culture. She seeks out K.C. for a dress to wear to the dinner and chooses a more modest second option, but is drenched by Ventresca a second time, causing her to punch him in the face and switch back to a more revealing dress. McMurphy is surprised to find Bernard is the father of two children by two different women. The two share a kiss when they are interrupted by word that Bernard’s former wife Roxanne is in distress. They find her suicidal and holding a shard of glass; McMurphy is able to talk her down with a speech meant for her own mother. Later, Bernard shares that she was unable to handle the death of their child together and asks McMurphy to tell him about her home in Kansas. Beckett is furious with K.C. when she sets up a voter registration drive in the morgue. He trashes her decorations and discovers she registered dead men as voters. K.C. compares her poor existence in Missouri with Beckett’s upbringing under Jim Crow in North Carolina, arguing that she is taking advantage of the opportunity in a capitalist system, but he tells her he believes in a more idealistic way forward. Lila asks Sarge Pepper to light his cache of fireworks for a July 4th celebration; after refusing initially, the two spend most of the holiday in bed discussing their future together. As morale dips around China Beach from the rainy weather, Holly seeks to raise spirits by reciting the Declaration of Independence. While practicing, she is shocked to learn from Hang, a Vietnamese woman who works around the base, that much of Ho Chi Minh’s speech about Vietnam’s independence came from the American declaration. She and Boonie organize an impromptu game of softball in the rain, ending with Sarge Pepper’s cascade of fireworks.
29	6	"Ghosts"	Michael Fresco	Toni Graphia	November 8, 1989	186807	15.0
Dodger tells his unit of elite Viet Cong squads who move like ghosts, including his experiences being hunted by one such squad and early in his tour. Around China Beach, the staff and soldiers are haunted by their relationships. Dr. Richard is again despondent when he receives a wedding invitation from his ex-wife and her new lover. He organizes a “black wedding” to celebrate the end of his marriage. Mai visits Beckett, who she has grown distant from since he returned to active duty, and brings him clothes he had left in her home. Inspired by Holly, Beckett tries to pair a found ring with the deceased soldier who owned it but is unsuccessful. K.C. receives a package of her father’s remaining possessions after his death. She considers it junk and refuses to sort through it, although McMurphy encourages her to forgive her father, leading K.C. to watch one of the old home movies. On a visit to the orphanage, McMurphy and Dr. Bernard discuss Dodger, who has earned the doctor’s respect by continuing to visit his son and bringing medicine and supplies there. She turns down his advances, still unsure about his children and their differences, but is surprised by Vinnie the next day on the beach and agrees to attend the black wedding with him. Dodger seeks supplies from K.C., telling her he intends on his son bringing to the U.S., and she retorts that his son will always be a reminder of the war and their inequality. At his “bachelor party,” Richard tells Beckett about the first night spent with his wife and the moment he fell in love with her. After an argument with Bernard, McMurphy stands up Vinnie for the black wedding, where Richard leads the group in burning effigies of his ex-wife and her new husband. Beckett returns to Mai, who tells him her village is being moved and she will not see him again. Beckett proposes to her with the found ring, but she declines. McMurphy returns to Bernard, where she explains her hesitance to get close to him and the two spend the night together. In the base’s cemetery, K.C. symbolically buries the box of her father’s possessions.
30	7	"With a Little Help from My Friends"	Michael Uno	Joseph Anderson & Carol Flint	November 15, 1989	186808	16.7
As China Beach prepares for a Battle of the Bands, Holly discovers that Hang, the Vietnamese woman who works in K.C.’s salon, is a gifted musician and asks her to perform. McMurphy is exasperated to be extended in the civilian ward treating locals instead of working in triage. She is partnered with Dr. Bernard, brought on as a consultant. Holly discovers Hang being accosted by a man Hang says is her cousin, and K.C. warns the man to leave her alone. Frankie is nearly killed when a saboteur plants a grenade on her Jeep, leaving her distrustful of the Vietnamese locals working around the base. MPs shoot the saboteur and discover grenades in his possession, but Hang lies to Holly and says it was not her cousin, upsetting Holly. When some of the firebases Holly had shown Hang on her map are overrun, Holly begins to believe that Hang may be feeding information to the Viet Cong. On the way to get medical supplies, Bernard and McMurphy share a moment in the back of his truck. A jealous Vinnie searches the truck when they return to China Beach. Hang agrees to play with Holly but asks her for the used guitar strings; during practice the next day, Holly and Boonie find a grenade on the Jet Set stage rigged with a guitar string, convincing Holly that Hang is a saboteur. At the show, Hang tells Holly that the strings were taken from her by the VC whom have forced her into their service of being an informant. Holly tries to encourage her to tell the truth to the local authorities, but Hang fears her entire family being killed if she does. The two sing a duet of “Blowin' in the Wind” before Army investigators and Vietnamese military police arrive and take Hang away to an uncertain future.
31	8	"China Men"	David Burton Morris	Josef Anderson	November 22, 1989	186805	15.1
Dodger and Hyers clash after a battlefield incident where Hyers refuses to cover Dodger on his dash to reach an injured soldier. When Dodger’s unit returns to combat, he leaves Hyers on the helipad. Boonie is smitten by the singer of a band who visits the Jet Set for a casino night — much to Holly’s disappointment, as she struggles to hide her feelings for him. Boonie brings the singer back to his quarters, but severely injures his abdomen and groin during a late-night bombing. McMurphy is invited to dinner by Dr. Bernard, but she is frustrated by his high-society guests exclusively speaking French and disappointed when Bernard asks his colleague to put his son to bed, not McMurphy. She leaves to find Vinnie waiting outside for her and accepts his ride back to base. When he asks what she wishes for, she tells him fudge brownies with nuts, a bubble bath, and satin sheets to sleep on; they share a kiss as he departs. Hyers recounts a story to McMurphy from his teens about his friend running away in fear when he was beaten by a man outside a roller rink. Hyers tries to apologize to Dodger and Dodger warns him to stay out of combat. Later, while drinking with McMurphy, Hyers admits he was the one who ran away and needs to stand up to Dodger now. He tries to buy Dodger a drink and challenges him to a fight, ending with Dodger beating him easily. When the bus carrying the band hits a landmine, Boonie and the hospital staff discover the singer is trans. Boonie is embarrassed and does not know how to react, but he accepts her apology for concealing it from him. During a night bombing, Hyers reveals to McMurphy his reticence for combat: while hunting with his father as a child, he witnessed a man die from a gunshot wound. McMurphy is approached by an MP who claims she needs to speak with a colonel. There, she is surprised by Vinnie, who has followed through on her wish for brownies and a hot bath. Dodger returns from the bush with a slew of wounded soldiers. In need of a medic, he assists Hyers boarding the helicopter to head back into the field.
32	9	"How to Stay Alive in Vietnam: Part 1"	Fred Gerber	Georgia Jeffries	November 29, 1989	186809	16.9
Press photographer Cat Von Seeger (guest star Lisa Banes) draws the ire of McMurphy when she takes photos of the bloodshed at the hospital in China Beach. Beckett asks Dodger to join his patrol, as he is troubled by visions of the men in the morgue telling him he needs to experience combat to be worthy of serving in Graves Registration. Dodger turns him down. Von Seeger joins Dodger’s patrol, much to his chagrin, making quick friends with Hyers and radioman Jesus “Answer Man” Zappara (guest star Robert LaSardo). Beckett surprises Dodger at their rally point and he joins the patrol too. Dodger’s patrol catches up to a Viet Cong squad transporting a wounded prisoner. While surveilling the squad, the glare from Von Seeger’s camera gives away their position and Dodger’s patrol kills all but one of the VC soldiers, who manages to escape. The prisoner, Seak Yin (guest star Haing Ngor), tells Hyers he was seeking amnesty by defecting from the VC. Answer Man discovers the radio fried; unable to move Seak Yin with any efficiency, the patrol is forced to wait hours for its repair. Dodger reveals to Von Seeger that his tour has already ended, even as he continues to fight, and she urges him to leave Vietnam and go home. As the evac helicopter reaches their landing zone, the patrol is ambushed by VC. Beckett kills a VC soldier in hand-to-hand combat and Hyers is gravely wounded. He struggles to relay aid instructions to Von Seeger and Dodger before the helicopter returns. Rushed back to China Beach, Hyers is pronounced dead at the hospital. The episode is intercut with monologues by several characters: McMurphy on love, sex, and guilt; Holly on the unknowns of combat and The Lone Ranger; Dr. Richard on his children; Lila on optimism in war; K.C. on bad men; and in the longest, Sarge Pepper on his rules to stay alive, followed by a vivid recounting of an ambush where he had to kill another U.S. soldier to save his platoon.
33	10	"How to Stay Alive in Vietnam: Part 2"	Steven Dubin	Georgia Jeffries	December 6, 1989	186811	16.0
Lila is replaced in command of China Beach by Maj. Melvin P. Otis (guest star Dorian Harewood). He takes an immediate liking to K.C., greenlighting her plan to sell cars to servicemen in the PX, a scheme Lila had shut down. Otis asks K.C. on a date and continues to pursue her, placing an ad for her business in the military newspaper. The two fall asleep together, but K.C. reminds Otis that he offered support with no strings attached. Frankie is transferred to be Otis’s aide and annoys Lila with loud music. She drowns her sorrows at the Jet Set, where she tells a happy K.C. that no one will take her seriously because she is a woman. Angry over Dr. Bernard standing her up for a date, McMurphy strikes up a friendship with Seak Yin, the injured prisoner brought in by Dodger’s patrol. He tells McMurphy that he was taken from his village in Cambodia and forcibly conscripted into the Viet Cong, finally defecting after more than two years in combat. He is soon transferred to a Vietnamese military prison, where McMurphy discovers him beaten and denied medical care. She learns that he is a pariah in the prison, as VC soldiers believe he gave information to the U.S. military, while the MPs believe that he led an ARVN patrol into a deadly ambush. Von Seeger suggests coming along with McMurphy to document Seak Yin’s plight and McMurphy reaches out to Bernard for help. The trio is told by the commanding officer at the prison that McMurphy is not allowed to see Seak Yin again. As they are leaving, McMurphy witnesses guards dragging Seak Yin out of the prison and executing him, which Von Seeger captures on camera. Before she departs, she gives McMurphy his Buddhist prayer necklace.
34	11	"Magic"	Mimi Leder	John Wells	January 3, 1990	186810	16.6
As a traveling circus comes to China Beach, McMurphy continues her relationship with Dr. Bernard — and is warned by Lila to stop fraternizing with enlisted soldiers. However, she is surprised by Dr. Richard’s news of a party at the French embassy that Bernard did not invite her to. While drowning her sorrows at the Jet Set, Vinnie arrives and tells her he’s no longer going to pursue her. The two share a kiss and spend the night together on the beach. Bernard visits her at the hospital and the two argue, but he invites her to dinner at his house. She seeks counsel from K.C., who encourages her to keep both men pursuing her. After her night with Vinnie, McMurphy is given a formal reprimand in her record from Lila and is reassigned to the graveyard shift. She is surprised by both men at the Jet Set, leaving with Bernard to Vinnie’s dismay. Holly continues to have feelings for Boonie, meeting him at the beach and helping him prepare for the GED. When Sarge Pepper point outs that she is clearly interested in him and another soldier makes a crude comment about her size, Boonie strikes the soldier in the face, but he ultimately shares an intimate dance with Holly. At the circus, Sarge Pepper surprises Lila with a stuffed animal and tells her he loves her, but Lila (herself fraternizing with an enlisted soldier) tells him it’s not enough and walks away. Otis invites K.C. to an officers’ welcome dinner as his date and gives her a dress and pearls. With a prior engagement to grow her business, she declines, only to discover that the prior engagement was an invitation to be the prostitute at Otis’s dinner. The two have a heated confrontation the next morning, ending with Otis tearing the pearls from K.C.’s neck, the two slapping one another, and K.C. tossing the dress at him. Vinnie breaks up Bernard and McMurphy’s night together, causing her to storm out on the two. The next day, she apologizes to Vinnie and asks Bernard what their future could be together, leaving their declarations of love empty-handed; Bernard ends up bedding his French colleague and Beckett cheers a dour McMurphy with magic tricks he’s gleaned from the circus.
35	12	"Nightfall"	Christopher Leitch	Lydia Woodward	January 10, 1990	186812	16.9
Boonie discovers the battered body of a buxom Vietnamese prostitute in a black sparkling gown that was washed upon the seashore, he rushes her to McMurphy’s stretcher so she can revive the victim, but no avail. During her autopsy, McMurphy recognizes an earring she was wearing matching a pair she had borrowed from K.C. Beckett finds that someone has carved “diem,” the Vietnamese word for prostitute, on her stomach. McMurphy asks K.C. if she recognizes the earring or the woman, but she denies any knowledge. However, flashbacks show K.C. helped dress the woman for a night with officers. K.C. asks Otis about the woman’s death, which he refers to as an “extremely unfortunate accident” and says that an investigation is unlikely to happen. K.C. vows to investigate it on her own, starting with Sarge Pepper, who drove the woman to the party. He tells her that he left the woman behind with the officers, more concerned about possible damage to his Jeep, and gives her loose pearls he had found in the vehicle. She continues with Lila, asking her to intervene, but Lila declines to get involved. The woman’s teenage daughter shows up and asks to work for K.C., believing her mother has found an American soldier. Together, they visit the madame of a Da Nang brothel, who acts unconcerned about the woman’s death and refuses to give K.C. any information. Lila has a change of heart and gives K.C. the list of officers at the party, relating to being the lone woman at officers’ parties. K.C. confronts Otis and threatens to elevate the investigation, but he urges her to drop it. On a visit back to the brothel, K.C. discovers the woman’s daughter with an American soldier and intervenes, but suffers a cut on her face when the soldier strikes her back. Sarge Pepper returns an engraved lighter to K.C., a gift she had rejected from Otis, and she realizes that he was at the party and knows more than he has told her — potentially even the officer who murdered the woman. She confronts him with it and he denies killing the woman, then reveals he is transferring back to Saigon. K.C. pays the madame for the freedom of the woman’s daughter and sends her off with a nun. Shaken by the events, she gives a confessional in the church ruins. In it, she compares her life as a prostitute to the cattle slaughtered in her rough first job stateside in a meatpacking plant; while she had built up a hardened exterior, she now worries of something that could “pierce her heart.”
36	13	"Souvenirs"	John Sacret Young	John Sacret Young	January 17, 1990	186813	14.8
Dodger discovers a dead infant in a burned village and tells McMurphy he’s leaving, as his tour is long over — and surprises her with the declaration he’s bringing his son back to the U.S. with him. She warns him that parenting the baby will be difficult and getting adoption approval from the U.S. embassy and the South Vietnamese government even harder, but Dodger is set in his decision. However, he immediately hits roadblocks at both government offices, rejected by the South Vietnamese government and told the adoption process could take weeks, if not months. He also faces opposition from the nun who works at the orphanage his son lives in who believes that his son won't be accepted and face prejudice in America. But Dodger points out that his son wouldn't be accepted in Vietnam either, but in America he will at least have the love and support of Dodger and the rest of his American family, as well many opportunities in life that he wouldn't have in Vietnam. With few other options, McMurphy brings him to K.C., who requests payment to help get his baby out of the country. Dodger prepares to enter the bush again to reach a village and fulfill K.C.’s request against McMurphy’s wishes. Before he leaves, he sends away Boonie, who tries to join him on his quest. In the ashen ruins of the village, he finds a golden necklace K.C. was seeking. Exiting the bush to a lively USO show, the normally stoic Dodger gets emotional at the thought of leaving Vietnam and the memories of his time there. He returns to China Beach and finds Boonie has thrown a party to celebrate his impending departure; Boonie also gives Dodger the Navy Cross he had received for his actions on their patrol together. K.C. gives him back the necklace he had retrieved for her, having had a change of heart requesting payment for her help. While awaiting a helicopter for his departure, McMurphy urges Dodger to stay the course as he adjusts to life away from Vietnam and to not come back. McMurphy tells him she’ll visit him when she returns stateside, but he tells her not to before telling her he loves her. The two share a tearful embrace as he boards the helicopter to leave China Beach. Back in the U.S., he disembarks a train in his hometown, his son in his arms. The episode is intercut with interviews of real-life Vietnam veterans (many featured in the season 2 episode “Vets”), who discuss topics related to Dodger’s exit from Vietnam such as the bureaucracy underpinning the war, the camaraderie between soldiers, treating maimed and orphaned children, and the transition from Vietnam to civilian life in the U.S. The episode ends with Dodger and his son getting off the train at his hometown ready to start a new life.
37	14	"Holly's Choice"	Christopher Leitch	Carol Flint	January 31, 1990	186814	14.8
Told in reverse chronology, the men and women of China Beach grapple with Holly’s decision to have an abortion. (The following is a linear description of the episode’s events.) During a visit to a nearly empty firebase, Holly attempts to cheer up a sullen soldier, Zimmer, who is struggling with guilt after killing U.S. soldiers in a friendly fire artillery incident. Holly and Zimmer sleep together in a bunker. Weeks later, when several of the women are sequestered together during a night of bombing, Frankie tells a story about fearing she was pregnant as a teenager that resonates with Holly. The next day, she takes a pregnancy test and is informed by McMurphy she is pregnant. She seeks counsel from McMurphy, intimating about the possibility of getting an abortion, but McMurphy tells her that she wouldn’t consider an abortion because of her faith and her conviction as a nurse to save lives. After informing Boonie of the pregnancy, he offers to marry Holly, but she rejects his proposal and asks for a $200 loan she gives to K.C. to help her obtain an abortion. K.C. details a plan for her to travel to Japan for the procedure, but Holly lacks the leave time to travel and asks her to come up with a local option. McMurphy visits her and offers to contact her brother, who has struggled to have children with his wife and is seeking to adopt. Holly rejects her offer, set in her decision. Zimmer visits Holly at her garden, which has started to grow, but Holly withholds the news of her pregnancy. Still troubled by the friendly fire incident, he reveals to Holly he nearly wrote his girlfriend at home about Holly before deciding not to, similar to his choice to keep silent about the friendly fire. Rejected by a Vietnamese doctor and hesitant to try an office in a seedy Da Nang storefront, Holly and K.C. brew a “poison” to induce her to miscarry. Holly visits K.C. and expresses relief that the homebrew worked, but she visits again later that night and tells her she’s bleeding and suffering from a fever. K.C. rushes her to the hospital ward, where Dr. Richard treats Holly for hemorrhaging and an infection. Richard threatens to press charges against both women; K.C. refuses to leave Holly’s side, while an angered Holly orders McMurphy out of the room when she tries to assist Richard. Once Holly’s condition stabilizes, K.C. and Richard argue about Holly and the lack of then-legal options available to her, and Richard admits that he performed an illegal abortion on his wife when she contracted German measles in 1963. Her garden fully mature, Holly has a terse conversation with McMurphy, who she feels judged by deciding to proceed with the abortion. Later, as she departs the firebase on a return trip, Holly approaches Zimmer’s friend, who silently informs her that Zimmer has committed suicide over his guilt at the friendly fire incident. Holly sobs as the helicopter departs.
38	15	"A Rumor of Peace"	Neema Barnette	Josef Anderson	February 7, 1990	186815	14.1
Frankie, back working as China Beach’s radio host, is frustrated when the military bans the records of popular bands on the radio. With most of the base listening to Hanoi Hannah (and her faster reporting of college football scores), Frankie and Beckett hijack the signal and begin broadcasting pirate radio by naming themselves 'Miss Wizard' and 'Doctor Dark'. However, when the two of them broadcast that the war is over, China Beach breaks out in celebrations — and reveals some hard truths. McMurphy, filling in on the night shift, tries to save the life of a severely wounded soldier in the ward, determined not to have him be the final casualty in Vietnam. A drunk Lila reveals to McMurphy the other nurses call her “Sister McMartyr” (or Lila’s own “Our Lady of Perpetual Duty”), annoyed by her holier-than-thou attitude. Sarge Pepper declares his love for Lila; she eventually reciprocates and the two spend the night together. K.C. tries to coax Boonie into driving her to Da Nang, worried that the war’s end will scuttle her business deals. Frankie and Beckett grapple with admitting the peace announcement was a lie. Beckett is driven to his breaking point when the base lights a bonfire with the furniture from the Jet Set. He starts a final broadcast, asking listeners to keep the faith when the truth is revealed and noting the war ends every day for soldiers killed in action. McMurphy and Dr. Richard acknowledge the likely end of their complex relationship, sharing what they believe to be a final dance together. As morning breaks, the celebrations continue, but a helicopter carrying fresh wounded snaps the base out of the illusion of peace.
39	16	"Warriors"	David Soul	S : Dottie Dartland; T : Martin M. Goldstein & Neal Baer	February 14, 1990	186816	14.9
McMurphy receives a Bronze Star, earning the jealousy of Dr. Richard. To McMurphy’s shock, Vinnie is wounded and brought back to China Beach. He implores her to treat his friend Gil, but Richard discovers severe damage to his brain stem and sends him to the “checkout counter” to die. While delivering a body to Beckett, she discovers Gil still alive and struggling to breathe. She performs a tracheotomy to keep him alive, but Richard confirms he is braindead and warns McMurphy not to resuscitate him again. When Vinnie finds Gil alive, McMurphy gives him false hope that Gil may wake up. McMurphy puts Gil on a respirator when Vinnie pleads for help at night. Frankie is mistakenly given a promotion to sergeant and is sent to lead a combat squad. Unprepared for the role, she loses two weeks of meat rations in an ill-fated bet over a football game with a much larger squad. The squad tries to humiliate her by faking a live grenade being tossed at them, but are quieted when Frankie dives on it to save them instead of running away. Sarge Pepper reveals to her he ran from the grenade when the same prank was pulled on him, inspiring her to return to the squad, which has received orders to ship out. Together, they execute a heist to steal back the meat rations. When the real Sgt. Bunsen arrives, Frankie sends off the squad, their respect earned. Admitting the truth that Gil may not wake up, Vinnie questions keeping him alive in his vegetative state. Richard is irate at finding Gil on the respirator and Vinnie angrily confronts McMurphy when he finds Gil still alive the next night. McMurphy apologizes for the messy way their relationship ended, but refuses to help Gil die. The next day, Richard’s presentation of the Bronze Star and his words about the importance of her comforting dying soldiers convinces her to let Gil die; she and Vinnie keep vigil over Gil until he passes.
40	17	"The Thanks of a Grateful Nation"	Mimi Leder	John Wells	February 28, 1990	186817	15.4
McMurphy sends a letter to Dodger, hoping to hear from him since his departure from Vietnam. Dodger, real name Evan Winslow, struggles to acclimate to life back in Red Lodge, Montana. Living with his infant son, named Archie, his parents, and sister, Dodger works a dead-end job as a dishwasher at a local bar. However, true to his claims, Archie is shown to have been fully accepted into Dodger's family and is thriving. However, Dodger is clearly struggling with his civilian life and also refuses to wear his Marine dress uniform to church as his mother wishes. He reunites with Richard (guest star Doug Savant), his best friend from school. He tries to set Dodger up with Sissy (guest star Helen Hunt), who recognizes him from high school. During a game of pool, the group is shocked by Dodger’s admission that he volunteered to go to Vietnam and that he enjoyed parts of the experience. Richard reveals that his draft deferment is up because he failed to get into medical school and he plans to flee to Canada. Dodger visits Sissy and is surprised to find she is a mother of two children and estranged from her husband. While looking at their yearbook, he discovers Sissy had dreams of being a surgeon in Boston before motherhood ended them; he too admits he “got lost somewhere” and they spend the night together. Dodger’s father (guest star Tom Bower) joins Dodger in the treehouse he spends most of his time at home in. He tells Dodger he was wounded in World War II, describing it to him in vivid detail, leaving Dodger in tears. While Dodger is at work one night, a drifter and Vietnam veteran (guest star Robert Knepper) enters for a drink. The drifter wonders if their sacrifices will be acknowledged like those of the bar owner, a World War II vet, and says he’ll stop roaming once the Vietnam veterans have a monument like the Iwo Jima statue. Dodger travels to visit Sweetness, finding him tending to birds on a city rooftop. The two discuss their grief and confusion over surviving Vietnam, and they briefly consider jumping from the roof. Dodger pulls them both back from the ledge and the two soldiers tearfully express their brotherhood and love for one another. Later, Dodger gives Richard the keys to his old Chevrolet and wears his dress uniform to church. He joins Richard to “visit old friends,” traveling to a veterans’ cemetery. He stops at a grave of an unidentified soldier and admits to Richard he thought he’d recognize a name on one of the gravestones but did not, even though he remembers their faces. He vows not to forget their sacrifices.
41	18	"Skylark"	Fred Gerber	Lydia Woodward	March 14, 1990	186819	15.4
A soldier named McDonnell is wounded in action, dies while being treated by McMurphy and Dr. Richard at China Beach, and is processed through Beckett’s morgue. Soon after, a bickering McMurphy and Richard are interrupted by Ruby (guest star Ruby Dee) and Ernie (guest star Joe Seneca), who arrive to Ella Fitzgerald’s version of Skylark and claim to be a visiting USO dance troupe. Frankie and Answer Man are assigned to work in the motor pool, where they’re constantly ridiculed by Sarge Pepper with bigoted remarks. The two are surprised by Ruby and Ernie, who encourage them to work on a truck Sarge Pepper had declared them incapable of restoring, producing a needed distributor cap out of nowhere. Later, Sarge Pepper is shocked by Frankie and Answer Man’s restoration job on the pickup. McMurphy and Richard’s divide worsens; Richard finds Ruby and Ernie’s commitment heartening and asks McMurphy who she’ll be dancing with in 40 years when she makes a snide remark about Richard’s ex-wife. The base dance competition is interrupted by a bombing, and McMurphy is struck by Ruby comforting dying soldiers. Suspicious of the old couple since their arrival, she searches Ruby’s belongings, finding letters from her grandson written over a decade prior. Ruby and Ernie ask Beckett about the lost items he collects from dead soldiers. Beckett tells them that he likes to make up stories about them to continue their legacies, which causes Ernie to give him a penknife that was passed down in his family and was supposed to go to his grandson. McMurphy pulls McDonnell’s file, discovering that Ruby and Ernie are likely his grandparents — and that the records show they died in 1958, which she chalks up to an Army clerical error. K.C. finds the old couple sleeping in her bed. They encourage her to join them, and Ernie offers to tell her a bedtime story, but K.C. cannot remember being told one in her childhood. After a night of restful sleep with them, she awakes by herself. The next morning, Ernie tells Richard he hadn’t seen his grandson since he was 7 and that an “accident” had kept them apart. In conversation with Ruby, McMurphy pieces together their true identity and asks if the old couple are angels, but Ruby tells her that she, Richard, and Beckett are angels to the wounded and dying who pass through China Beach. That night, upon hearing Skylark on the helicopter pad, Richard and McMurphy share a dance.
42	19	"Phoenix"	Mimi Leder	Toni Graphia	March 21, 1990	186820	14.3
An American assassin disguised as a Vietnamese farmer shoots and kills a man outside his home, but is severely wounded when the man’s wife stabs him in the gut. K.C. holds a sale of some of her items, drawing McMurphy’s ire when she puts out for sale a crucifix McMurphy had given her; K.C. wears it for McMurphy instead. Boonie strikes up a friendship with a Vietnamese boy nicknamed GTO who claims to be 15. The wounded man (guest star Kevin Kilner), going by the names Ace and Agent 29, is taken to China Beach, where he demands not to be anesthetized during lifesaving surgery. He slips out of the ward after the procedure and finds K.C., asking her to meet with a Vietnamese contact, Truong Chinh, in Da Nang. At their meeting, Truong Chinh is shot at point-blank range by a different agent and rips the crucifix from K.C.’s neck as he falls through a window. Truong Chinh is brought to the ward for emergency surgery but is suffocated the next morning, leaving K.C. as the prime suspect. McMurphy denies K.C.’s involvement to military investigators but refuses to lie about her whereabouts on the night of the shooting, leading to K.C.’s arrest. Boonie discovers GTO is actually 18 and angrily confronts him about avoiding his duty to serve, causing GTO to leave the base. GTO returns in uniform and Boonie admits to him he remains in Vietnam because he likes it, but GTO replies that if Boonie wanted to escape war he could simply go home, while GTO does not have that option. McMurphy finds another agent rifling through the medical records for Agent 29’s file. She follows him back to the morgue, where Agent 29 is hidden in a body bag. She expresses her anger at them involving K.C. in their plan but the agent has no regrets, as they had credible evidence Truong Chinh was behind attacks on American servicemen and K.C. knew what her involvement meant — and was paid for it. After their departure, McMurphy finds K.C. at the Jet Set, her release secured by the agents’ arrangement. The two have an emotional fight; K.C. feels betrayed by McMurphy refusing to lie to save her and hurt by her remark that she doesn’t have a sister and didn’t want one, but McMurphy responds that she is in an apologetic gesture.
43	20	"F.N.G."	John Sacret Young	Carol Flint	April 16, 1990	186821	16.0
In 1966, McMurphy and her childhood friend Nellie, nurses in a Lawrence, Kansas hospital, join the U.S. Army together. McMurphy plans to join Nellie, who dreams of being stationed in Germany or Japan and meeting a doctor, in their overseas assignment. However, she is inspired by the combat medic training them at Fort Sam Houston to change her orders to Vietnam when the medic reveals he is returning to the war for a second tour. In training, the nurses are told of quickly assembled, fully air conditioned hospitals, but McMurphy arrives at China Beach that November to an unfinished ward completely exposed to the elements. She meets head nurse Jan Wyatt (guest star Debra Stricklin) and Dr. Singer (guest star Scott Jaeck), the veteran nurse and doctor at China Beach in the throes of a passionate affair. Elsewhere, K.C. (going by her middle name, Charlene) is pressured by one of her lovers, Lt. Col. “Mac” Miller (guest star Wings Hauser) to bed the base commander and protect herself from having to return to working under a pimp. Dr. Richard arrives at the same time as McMurphy, concerned with nothing but his own self-preservation. During their orientation, the two F.N.G.’s are thrust into a mass casualty incident. McMurphy is immediately overwhelmed and her first few patients die as she treats them. She meets Dodger, Boonie, and Sweetness for the first time when Dodger asks him to treat Boonie’s stab wound (suffered on their covert mission in Laos, seen in season 2’s “Twilight”) and forms a bond with a wounded soldier, Tommy (guest star Tim Griffin), who recognizes her perfume scent. McMurphy is shocked by the hospital staff partying after the hours in triage; told by the commander to keep her long hair off her collar again, she cuts most of it off with her surgical shears. She finds Tommy covered in ants in the open ward and promises to help him recover. McMurphy unsuccessfully seeks counsel from Jan about the previous day’s casualties. Instead, she warns McMurphy about beginning relationships with “geographic bachelors” like married doctors. At the beach, K.C. tries to rescue a despondent Boonie when he walks into the ocean. She is saved by him when she struggles in the waves and punches him in the face when he chastises her for following him in. The two spend the night together, interrupted by a bombing, and K.C. comforts Boonie when he has a panic attack during it. He admits that the experience in Laos has changed him and he no longer wants to return to combat; K.C. uses her new leverage with the commander to have Boonie reassigned to China Beach’s lifeguard post. The morning after the bombing, Tommy dies in McMurphy’s arms; she sobs over his body bag and records a message to Nellie in Germany where she says choosing to go to Vietnam was a mistake and she feels she isn’t cut out for it. Singer tells McMurphy that Jan had a patient like Tommy when she first arrived at China Beach who died and devastated her too. When a game of volleyball is broken up by the sound of evac helicopters, McMurphy sprays herself with perfume and heads to the ward with a newfound determination.
44	21	"The Gift"	Michael Katleman	Josef Anderson	April 23, 1990	186822	14.6
Lila is surprised when an old colleague from London and Korea, Lt. Col. Libby Heiss (guest star Barbara Babcock), visits China Beach to make a recruitment film about nurses. Libby quickly gets on Lila’s nerves, talking about her role in the Pentagon and repeatedly calling Lila “Scooter,” an old nickname from their World War II days; Lila and the nurses are also unimpressed by Libby’s clunky, reality-ignoring script for the film. McMurphy receives a $10,000 check when she is made the beneficiary of a dead soldier’s insurance policy. An Army investigator, Capt. Soubra (guest star Gerrit Graham), brings her a $20,000 check from a second life insurance policy. After questioning her (and receiving a brutal assessment of McMurphy from a drunk Dr. Richard), Soubra tells her the investigation will proceed to a full inquiry. He suggests to Lila that McMurphy be suspended until the inquiry is complete, but when she refuses, he goes over Lila’s head to do it. Lila asks Libby for help with McMurphy and is denied by Libby, obsessed with being promoted to colonel before her retirement in two years. When the base is bombed, the old colleagues are pressed into service as nurses. Libby faints, seemingly from the graphic injuries being treated, but Richard informs Lila of an untreated heart condition and Lila confronts Libby about it. Libby refuses to treat it, worried she’ll be medically retired before reaching colonel. The argument brings long-simmering tensions to the surface; Lila covered for Libby when she went AWOL in Korea to get married and took the fall for it, curtailing her opportunities for advancement over the years. At McMurphy’s inquiry, Soubra and another investigator question her about the soldiers who named her beneficiary. She cannot remember either soldier, but describes a night in triage in vivid detail — then reveals that she wasn’t talking about a specific day and that every night is virtually the same. The investigator closes the inquiry and lets McMurphy leave. Libby submits to the physical and agrees to see a specialist in Tokyo. Libby gives Lila a recommendation for Lila to succeed her at the Pentagon, but Lila tears it up, understanding her priorities now lie in commanding China Beach and being with Sarge Pepper. In the ward that night, she finally admits to the origin of her nickname: while stationed in London, she used a scooter to zip around the city and meet her male suitors.
45	22	"Strange Brew"	Michael Fresco	Georgia Jeffries	April 30, 1990	186818	12.6
McMurphy is troubled by nightmares of her and K.C. visiting a deserted, destroyed firebase. When most of the base heads to a firebase for a Cream concert and Dr. Richard takes a golfing trip, the two are left by themselves at China Beach. After a nightmare of the firebase being bombed, K.C. visits McMurphy in the ward, where she is treating a mysterious man who asks for his legs back. The two reminisce over high school and prom, with K.C. bringing up her teenage boyfriend Joey, and drink themselves into a stupor on the helicopter pad and pass out. Entering the dreamscape again, the two are guided by a Native American soldier named Dreamwalker (guest star Gary Farmer), the patient from the ward. He revives a dead soldier, K.C.’s old boyfriend Joey (guest star Clancy Brown), mystifying McMurphy. During a driving rainstorm, Dreamwalker helps McMurphy express her pain and confusion at watching her mother care for her alcoholic, increasingly abusive father over the years. Joey and K.C. reunite and discuss the breakdown of their relationship. K.C. still resents Joey for standing her up for the senior prom, revealing that he was a lifeline away from her father, who began sexually abusing her when she was 10. Joey tells K.C. not to blame herself for her father’s indiscretions. When the rain clears, McMurphy begins treating an endless line of wounded men before the soldier gives her a peace medallion and departs. She finds her mother in a cave and confronts her about failing to stop her father’s growing alcoholism and the effect it had on their family. Her mother tells her she can’t take the pain away from the soldiers she treats; understanding that her mother was fighting a losing battle much like she does in Vietnam, McMurphy tearfully tells her mother she loves her. McMurphy and K.C. are woken on the helicopter pad as news of the firebase being bombed reaches them; however, when the evac helicopter lands, McMurphy awakes in her bed, apparently all part of her dream. Katrina and the Waves and Eric Burdon appear as themselves at the concert.

=== Season 4 (1990–91) ===
No. overall	No. in season	Title	Directed by	Written by	Original release date	Prod. code	Viewers (millions)
46	1	"The Big Bang"	John Sacret Young	S : John Sacret Young & Lydia Woodward & Carol Flint; S/T : John Wells	September 29, 1990	187041	11.5
In 1985, Boonie — missing his right leg below the knee — and his family visits Dr. Richard, who is now married to another woman named Colleen. Richard reveals to Boonie that he and McMurphy have lost touch in the years since China Beach and apologizes to Boonie for his lost leg, ominously telling him there “wasn’t enough time.” Unable to sleep, Richard pulls out his photos from early in his tour in Vietnam, looking fondly at ones of McMurphy. In 1967, Richard and McMurphy have a fraught professional relationship; Richard pesters McMurphy with his camera and the two bicker over shaving the beard of an injured patient. Despite this, Dr. Singer (guest star Scott Jaeck) warns Richard — still happily married to his wife — that he will be drawn to McMurphy regardless of his marriage, just like his passionate relationship with head nurse Jan Wyatt. Tensions boil over when Richard and McMurphy operate on an injured dog and Richard insults her ability in the operating room. Boonie and K.C. grow closer, with Boonie helping her obtain an expensive bed for her quarters. However, K.C. is in a relationship with Colonel 'Mac' Miller (guest star Wings Hauser) the then commanding officer of the 510th Evac, who asks her to leave China Beach and return to the Philippines with him. Dodger visits Boonie, now painting the helicopter pad, and asks Boonie to return to combat, but Boonie refuses. At Singer’s final going-away party, Singer coaxes the medical staff to dress in gender-swapped costumes, with Richard wearing a nurse’s outfit and McMurphy wearing an MP’s uniform. Singer is stunned when an Army aide comes to gather Jan, not him, after she requested a transfer from the base with Singer’s impending departure in mind. When the base is bombed and overrun, McMurphy and Richard are attacked by a female Viet Cong soldier. Richard is saved from being stabbed by the tennis ball in his nurse outfit and McMurphy incapacitates her with an IV stand. Boonie runs to K.C., where he awkwardly finds her with Mac and K.C. informs Mac the two are lovers. After the attack, McMurphy and Richard nearly have an emotionally charged moment of passion together. Back in 1985, Richard tries to call McMurphy but is told he has the wrong number. On the other end, McMurphy hangs up. This episode is also known as History: Part I.
47	2	"She Sells More Than Sea Shells"	Mimi Leder	S : John Sacret Young & John Wells & Lydia Woodward; S/T : Carol Flint	October 6, 1990	187042	11.2
In 1967, Dr. Richard confirms K.C. is pregnant and several months along. Boonie asks K.C. if she thinks Mac is the father, but she declines to answer him. She greets Mac with the news of her pregnancy when he returns to China Beach and Mac asks her to come to the Philippines with him, but pours cold water on the idea of her running a store or business if she does. Boonie continues to help K.C., developing a rivalry with Mac after K.C. has a fainting spell. He urges her not to follow Mac and promises to always take care of K.C. and her baby. Mac is severely wounded when he is hit in the groin and abdomen by enemy fire while in a helicopter. K.C. still intends to travel with Mac on his evac flight and argues with Boonie over her future. The two share a passionate goodbye, but K.C. decides not to leave and sends Mac off. Warned by Richard she won’t be able to travel much longer without risk of premature birth and loss of the baby, she tells him that she had her first experiences with the baby moving, which has changed her perspective on her future. In 1985, Boonie’s adopted teenage daughter Karen (guest star Christine Elise) confronts Boonie that she now knows that someone, likely her mother K.C., has been sending Boonie checks over the past few years to help pay for her college studies. Karen leaves the family at a hotel and visits Richard again. She and Richard discuss K.C., Boonie, McMurphy, and memories of the past. Richard recommends she seek out McMurphy, as she knew K.C. best, but urges Karen not to shut Boonie out like K.C. did. Karen acknowledges that Boonie is afraid to let her get hurt like he was years ago. Boonie arrives at Richard’s practice and he and Karen share a tearful embrace. This episode is also known as History: Part II.
48	3	"You, Babe"	Mimi Leder	S : John Sacret Young & John Wells & Lydia Woodward & Carol Flint; T : Susan Rhinehart & Cathryn Michon	October 13, 1990	187045	11.6
In 1967, a heavily pregnant K.C. flies to Saigon to meet potential adoptive parents — against the wishes of Boonie, who again attempts to dissuade her from giving the baby away and offers to help her. She is joined by McMurphy, impersonating Dr. Richard for a doctor’s conference to meet her friend Nellie. The two discover they are staying next to one another in a hotel and have competing appointments: McMurphy, pretending to be Richard, meets with a general who seeks help treating his hemorrhoids, and K.C., pretending to be McMurphy, meets with the adoptive parents and claims she is pregnant by a deceased soldier. McMurphy balks at helping K.C. forge clean medical records for the adoptive parents, but is forced to help her when street children steal her wallet and her pass. At a Saigon flophouse, K.C. obtains the forged records before it is raided by MPs and McMurphy discovers K.C. had the children steal her wallet to ensure her participation in the scheme. Handcuffed together, the two women escape the MPs during a chase that ends at a church. K.C. and McMurphy get into a fight when K.C. reveals she took the key to their handcuffs from the MP, causing K.C.’s water to break in a Saigon alley. McMurphy helps her give birth to a healthy baby girl. In the hospital, K.C. tells McMurphy she still intends on giving the baby to the adoptive parents, but changes her mind after a night spent with her daughter. K.C. asks McMurphy to speak to the parents for her and leaves; back at China Beach, she refuses to tell Boonie and McMurphy the baby’s whereabouts. Back at her quarters on the base, she gives the baby to a Vietnamese woman, Trieu Au (guest star Kieu Chinh), to secretly raise the child away from China Beach.
49	4	"Escape"	Christopher Leitch	S : John Sacret Young & John Wells & Lydia Woodward & Carol Flint; T : Paris Qualles	October 27, 1990	187043	8.7
In 1985, at his father’s funeral in his hometown of Orchard Gap, North Carolina, Beckett reflects on attending his mother’s funeral as a young boy in 1957 and his arrival in Vietnam in 1967. Arriving aloof to combat, he is immediately ordered by Sarge Pepper — then the leader of a combat squad — to join Lynwood “Deadman” Crawford (guest star Kenneth Ransom), another African-American soldier, on R&R at China Beach. Deadman, convinced he will soon die in Vietnam, repeatedly tries to get Beckett to carry a cassette tape for his parents and his wristwatch. Upon arrival, he draws the ire of McMurphy by making a callous joke about an escape artist killed during an ill-fated fall from a helicopter. Soon after, Boonie is thrilled when the officer’s club is destroyed in a bombing, leaving the Jet Set the sole bar in China Beach. Beckett enlists Deadman in stealing the escape artist’s body from the morgue with plans to bury it on the beach to save him from an eternity inside an inescapable box. There, he tells Deadman that he’s relieved to be out of his father’s house, while Deadman tells Beckett of his father’s pride in him joining the military. The two are caught during the scheme and Beckett’s indifference gets the two assigned to China Beach’s Graves Registration Unit. Beckett is again relieved, this time to be avoiding combat, but the work unnerves Deadman. Beckett meets Dr. Richard and Dr. Singer for the first time, both impressed by his theft of the body from the morgue. After weeks of waiting, Singer finally receives his orders to return home. When Deadman is reassigned to combat, he hangs himself in the church ruins on the base. Upon the discovery, Beckett gives an angry sermon, comparing Deadman’s death to the reading he gave at his mother’s funeral as a child. McMurphy tells Beckett that Deadman’s suicide will be investigated; unwilling to allow his parents to find out, he shoots Deadman’s body with an M14 rifle to make it appear that he was killed in combat. McMurphy joins Beckett in prayer at the old church and gives him Deadman’s watch. In 1985, with Deadman’s watch still in hand, he begins his tearful eulogy for his father, recalling the words he spoke in 1957 and 1967.
50	5	"Fever"	Diane Keaton	S : John Sacret Young & John Wells & Carol Flint; S/T : Lydia Woodward	November 3, 1990	187044	10.2
In 1967, McMurphy bonds with Dodger, treats an injured Vietnamese girl with the help of Dodger and his gorilla suit, and deals with most of the base mistakenly believing it is her birthday. She tries to resist Boonie and Dodger giving her a birthday “baptism” by ocean but ends up frolicking in the water with them. That night, she surprises her friends at her birthday celebration with the gorilla costume before they serenade her with Happy Birthday to You. In 1970, a civilian McMurphy lives with her mother in Lawrence, Kansas. The two frequently clash in the empty house over her mother’s push to renovate most of the rooms and her criticism of McMurphy’s drinking and her dogtags from Vietnam. Back at work at the local hospital, she is bored by the monotony of nursing work on her quiet post-op floor and seeks a transfer to the trauma unit, but is denied by her supervisor. She is instead transferred to the maternity ward, where she works alongside a pregnant Nellie. At Nellie’s baby shower, McMurphy snaps at her mother when she begins to talk over the party about her father. She leaves the party and heads to a bar, where she gets drunk and picks up a man with the story about her mistaken birthday in 1967. She brings the man home and he is made uncomfortable by their behavior singing to Peggy Lee’s Fever and leaves. After the man leaves, McMurphy tells her mother that her father talked of dancing with her mother on his last night and that he loved her more than anything, but her mother solemnly responds that McMurphy was with him on his final night, not her. The next day, Nellie asks McMurphy to be her baby’s godmother and tries to talk to her about Vietnam. Nellie acknowledges that her experiences in Saigon removed from the most intense combat were much different than McMurphy’s at China Beach, but McMurphy shuts her down. On her way off-duty one night, she turns around to help in the emergency room involving seriously injured people from a multi-car accident, giving her flashbacks to triage at China Beach. She prays for clarity in the maternity ward, arriving home drunk in her still bloodied nurse uniform, shocking her mother. The two dance in the pouring rain together, sharing a happy moment, but McMurphy tearfully confides in her that she is unable to come to terms with her time in Vietnam and must leave Lawrence for good. At the bus station, McMurphy gives a young girl her dogtags and boards a bus, her destination unknown.
51	6	"Juice"	John Sacret Young	S : John Wells & Lydia Woodward & Carol Flint; S/T : John Sacret Young	November 10, 1990	187046	10.2
On the eve of the 1972 Republican National Convention, Dr. Richard arrives in Miami for a weekend away with Dr. Colleen Flaherty (guest star Colleen Flynn), hoping to consummate their relationship. While making a stop at a nearby convenience store, Richard is stunned to run into McMurphy, riding a motorcycle and living a hardscrabble life as a worker at an orange juice plant. He brings McMurphy back to meet the other Colleen, who is embarrassed when the pair walk in on her waiting to seduce Richard. McMurphy leaves, heading into the marshes of southern Florida to rendezvous with animal wrangler Noon Gantry (guest star Gavan O'Herlihy). Richard visits her at work the next day; while McMurphy says she and the doctor agreed not to contact one another while returning stateside, he manages to convince her to join him for a night out with Colleen. In a flashback to 1968, McMurphy and Richard are “married” by a soldier and chaplain who wanted to marry a couple with his dying wish. At their first stop of the night, Colleen reveals that Richard frequently talks about McMurphy, while McMurphy retorts that she never talks about him and has dealt with her feelings from their relationship. The hard-drinking McMurphy quickly gets Colleen drunk and the trio are picked up by Noon. Richard asks Noon if McMurphy has ever talked about him or his past, but he says no. Colleen tells McMurphy that Richard is in love with her and that she is tired of hearing about his experiences in China Beach. McMurphy ditches Noon and Colleen to take Richard to find a boat to go back to China Beach. Noon and Colleen end up at the alligator farm where he works and Colleen inadvertently reveals that McMurphy is a Vietnam veteran, shocking Noon. When Richard asks McMurphy how she ended up in Miami, McMurphy tells him that she’s made stops in multiple cities since leaving Lawrence, Miami being the latest. Richard confronts McMurphy about keeping her time at China Beach a secret from those who know her and tells her the reason he talks about it is because he loves McMurphy. In tears, she responds that she loved him and her time there as well, but the time is over and gone for them. She finishes by telling him she no longer wants to see him and that he has found “his Colleen.” The two fall asleep next to one another on the beach, but Richard wakes first and leaves without McMurphy. He apologizes to Colleen and opens up to her about his mixed emotions, and they recommit to one another. McMurphy apologizes to Noon for the previous night and for hiding her service, still unsure if she is over her time in Vietnam or Richard. She visits the veterans protest march at the RNC before getting on her motorcycle and riding off, again for parts unknown.
52	7	"One Giant Leap"	Michael Katleman	S : John Sacret Young & John Wells & Lydia Woodward & Carol Flint; T : Josef Anderson	November 17, 1990	187047	8.8
With hours to spare before the Apollo 11 mission in July 1969, Lila and Sarge Pepper leads China Beach’s effort to witness it by throwing a large celebration party. Boonie, at this point, has lost his affable demeanor and is now tired of war. He frequently smokes marijuana and provides soldiers recuperating and on R&R with drugs (mostly heroin). McMurphy is approached by an injured soldier, Everett Jr. (guest star Morgan Weisser), who asks her to lie about the extent of his injury to avoid going back into combat. She also finds herself jealous of new nurse Gloria Dawn (guest star Kathy Molter), who has caught the eye of Dr. Richard. Beckett also catches the attention of Sweet Hula (guest star Vanessa Bell Calloway), the USO singer visiting the base, and the two sleep together. McMurphy confronts Gloria Dawn about falsifying records to send soldiers home, but she checks Everett’s records and discovers he had previously been injured and sent to China Beach twice. Everett tells McMurphy the truth about his injury: He was shot by a child in the Viet Cong and has lost the stomach for war. Gloria Dawn expresses an interest in an open relationship with Richard. Sweet Hula and Beckett discuss the war’s outsized impact on African-American troops and Sweet Hula asks if he’s ever considered the white McMurphy as a romantic partner. Gloria Dawn allows a raucous party in the hospital ward, fueled by Boonie’s drug connections. The party is broken up by a pistol-wielding Everett, who threatens to shoot McMurphy and then shoot himself in the foot to end his military service. He hands over the gun and tells her it wasn’t loaded. McMurphy angrily confronts Boonie about the incident, but he tells her the war has changed him and he’s no longer interested in cheering up soldiers only for them to die in war. In the morgue, Beckett asks McMurphy to dance — and if she’s ever been interested in him before. She struggles for an answer, saying they’re just friends and that she’s never thought of them that way before, and the two share a kiss. As a rainstorm begins, the Apollo 11 astronauts begin their descent to the Moon. While driving a truck outside China Beach to return with astronaut-themed party supplies, Boonie strikes an explosive device in the road, knocking the truck off the road on its side into a rapidly rising stream and pinning his right leg beneath the truck. Sarge Pepper leads a group of men in a team effort to try and lift the waterlogged truck while Richard and McMurphy treat Boonie's leg injury, but both efforts are futile. Knowing Boonie’s injury is too serious to treat at China Beach, Richard calls for an evac helicopter. When an attempt to remove the truck sends Boonie below the water, Richard makes the split-second decision to amputate his leg with a knife underwater while McMurphy performs rescue breathing. Boonie is airlifted away for treatment, abruptly departing China Beach for good. Back at the hospital ward, McMurphy gives Everett the pistol to shoot himself in the foot and she turns away, flinching at the sound of a gunshot.
53	8	"One Small Step"	Steven Dubin	John Wells	December 1, 1990	187048	9.3
Boonie regains consciousness in the surgical unit of a Vietnam field hospital, where a surgeon and doctor examine his messy field amputation by Dr. Richard. He is flown by cargo plane to the Philippines and he informs his parents of his injury in an emotional phone call. At a Naval Hospital in Oakland, California, he bonds with a nurse, Linda Matlock (guest star Finn Carter) — first revealed to be his future wife in “The Big Bang” — who helps him adjust to his new disability. She also asks him to talk to a bedridden double amputee believed to be from Santa Cruz, but Boonie bonds with him upon discovering he actually went to a rival high school outside the city. Boonie falls out of bed one night and breaks his nose. The next day, he approaches Linda and asks about her service in Vietnam, but she avoids his questions. Boonie is informed by a doctor that he is scheduled to be placed on permanent disability and medically retired, but he requires an additional surgery to reshape the stump from his amputation so he can wear prosthetics without pain. During a “code red” situation in the bathroom, Boonie intervenes and talks down the double amputee, who threatens to kill himself with a shard of broken mirror. Soon after, he is transferred to a VA hospital in Santa Cruz, where he learns to walk with a prosthesis and avoids undergoing his necessary surgery. He is visited by Dodger with a toddler Archie in tow. Dodger suggests Boonie needs to spend a night with a woman and hires a prostitute who the two bring back to the VA hospital for a night of drinking with his friends. The prostitute swims with a paralyzed friend of Boonie’s as the others watch and reflect on returning home wounded. Later, they are deeply moved when a senile general living in the home plays the Battle Hymn of the Republic on his trumpet. Dodger drives Boonie to Linda’s home in Oakland. Boonie, afraid to have his stump revision surgery, arrives unannounced, afraid to look at his injury and seeking answers to who he is now. She invites him in but initially declines to help him, wanting to put Vietnam behind her. When Boonie asks her if he’s still a man, she leads him to the mirror in her bedroom, stripping him naked so he can see his missing leg in full view for the first time. Linda brings him to the hospital for his surgery and he tells her he’ll be okay, his confidence restored.
54	9	"The Call"	Robert Ginty	Paris Qualles & Cathryn Michon	December 8, 1990	187049	8.9
In October 1969, Frankie attends the funeral of a Black revolutionary, contrasted with McMurphy’s experience witnessing the funeral of a Marine Corps veteran after her father’s burial in Season 2’s “The World.” Now living in Chicago after her discharge from the Army, Frankie tries her hand at stand-up comedy with little to show for it. She draws the attention of two Black Panther revolutionaries and Vietnam veterans, Eddie (guest star Scott Lawrence) and Rashid (guest star Basil Wallace), who invite her to a party. She grows close to Eddie, who advocates for a nonviolent approach for change; however, she is disgusted by Rashid’s cache of weapons and his support for the Viet Cong and violent revolt in the U.S. Eddie asks her to attend the trial of Bobby Seale and support the protests for the Chicago Seven. She is horrified by the treatment of Seale in the courtroom, but refuses to support Eddie and Rashid in protesting it. Later, Rashid informs Frankie that Eddie was killed in his bed during a police raid. She attends Eddie’s funeral, witnessing as Rashid is dragged away by police when he lights an American flag on fire. At her stand-up set, Frankie struggles through her normal routine before giving an impassioned monologue on her status as an African-American Vietnam veteran. In the same time period at China Beach, McMurphy is now a captain and tracking casualty numbers in a notebook because she believes the military is downplaying the number of deaths. She receives a message from Dodger asking him to bring medical supplies for a remote Montagnard village. Arriving at the village, she finds Dodger working there as a government contractor, helping the villagers grow a resilient strain of rice while CIA and Army Ranger advisors train them to be insurgents. McMurphy is introduced to the elderly woman leading the village, Ilsa (guest star Viveca Lindfors), who warns her that the U.S. military presence in Vietnam is part of the village’s problem. Dodger asks McMurphy to stay with him in Vietnam and help build a hospital when her tour ends in a matter of weeks, bringing her to the site on a hilltop. Dodger reveals to her that he suffered nightmares about his war experiences until he returned to Vietnam as a contractor. Ilsa requests Dodger bring a nearby village rice and supplies that had been attacked, but he refuses when he finds out it is a Viet Cong village. Later that night, the village is bombed by the VC and McMurphy is whisked away by helicopter without Dodger and Ilsa. She returns to the ruins of the village the next morning, finding Dodger at the hospital site. Ilsa is also alive, helping the villagers clean up the debris. Feeling guilty about the attack, Dodger snaps at McMurphy and urges her to yell the names of casualties in her notebook. He admits to her he is not ready for a life in the U.S. yet, even with his son. He asks her to stay with him, but she declines. Back at China Beach, she begins spray-painting the names of dead soldiers from her notebook on the outside of the hospital ward.
55	10	"I Could Have Danced All Night... But Didn't"	Michael Fresco	S : Carol Flint; T : Cathryn Michon	June 4, 1991	187050	17.1
In late 1969, McMurphy auditions for Lila’s production of My Fair Lady, which stars Dr. Richard as the male lead. However, she is beaten out for the role by Gloria Dawn. Sarge Pepper approaches McMurphy with opinions on how to ask Lila to marry him. McMurphy visits Richard in his tent, where they share a drink to each having less than 100 days left in Vietnam. McMurphy tells him she doesn’t want to miss him when their tour is over, but they are interrupted by Gloria Dawn. Walking back to the base, she comes across the newly engaged Lila and Sarge Pepper, who plan a quick wedding to avoid military scrutiny. After the My Fair Lady performance, McMurphy tells off Richard, who believes she is still upset at not getting the part, and informs him she’s tired of no one knowing her true self. He wins her back with a performance of “On the Street Where You Live” and admits to her that he feared losing her as a friend if he pursued her romantically. The pair admit their love for one another and kiss, then decide to get married the next day after Lila and Sarge Pepper. The next morning, Richard receives a shocking message: His ex-wife has been critically injured in a car accident and he must return home, prematurely ending his tour in Vietnam and shelving his plan to marry McMurphy. The two attend Lila and Sarge Pepper’s wedding in the church ruins. Prior to boarding the helicopter out, Richard invites McMurphy to join him in Boston once her tour is over, but she declines. As his helicopter departs, Richard begins to sing “I've Grown Accustomed to Her Face,” as does McMurphy in the hospital ward. In 1983, McMurphy is the maid of honor at a backyard wedding in Portland, Oregon. She grouses to the drummer in the wedding band about the ostentatious changes ordered to the low-key wedding by the groom’s mother, only to discover the drummer is also the groom’s brother and best man, Joe Arneburg (guest star Adam Arkin). She flirts with Joe, who she immediately registers as a divorcee, and reveals herself to be sober when she orders a tonic water from the bar. McMurphy catches the bouquet, cutting her face and causing her to vent her frustrations at Joe. When the band begins playing an instrumental version of “I’ve Grown Accustomed to Her Face,” she asks Joe to dance, and the two formally introduce themselves.
56	11	"100 Klicks Out"	Mimi Leder	Susan Rhinehart	June 11, 1991	187051	13.1
On April 25, 1975, five days before the Fall of Saigon, K.C. — now living in Bangkok and operating a nightclub with the same name — is contacted by Trieu Au, seeking help getting eight-year-old Karen out of the country. K.C. returns to Vietnam, finding Trieu Au and Karen living in a decrepit apartment in a Saigon alley. Trieu Au, critical over K.C.’s avoidance of her and Karen for the past six years, asks for help getting Karen out of the country, worried that the city’s citizen committees will round them both up when Saigon is taken by the approaching North Vietnamese army. Intending to take them back to Bangkok, K.C. brings the two to the American embassy, where she is forced by the clerk to pay a hefty bribe for Trieu Au’s passage out of the country. However, Trieu Au is violently questioned by a citizen patrol and kidnapped. At the embassy the next day, K.C. is told her local hospital records from Karen’s birth aren’t enough to prove U.S. citizenship, requiring her to seek out a forger in Saigon to purchase them. Upon returning to the apartment, they find locals have cleaned the entire place out in their absence and K.C. finally tells a devastated Karen that she is her birth mother. The two return to the American embassy, where they wait all day and night to reach the helicopters ferrying civilians from the roof. Hoping to soothe Karen, K.C. promises to buy her a canopy bed while they wait. Finally reaching the roof, the two are refused entry to a helicopter, but K.C. begs a Marine to take Karen. She writes Boonie’s name on her dress in lipstick, then watches as the helicopter departs. Elsewhere in Vietnam, Dodger — still working as a government contractor — finds himself at the abandoned China Beach facility, on the run from approaching North Vietnamese troops. Entering the old hospital ward, he finds the Kansas flag once hanging in the ward, triggering memories of his time in China Beach. He discovers an apparent South Vietnamese soldier living in the ward and begins digging his own grave, convinced he will die at China Beach once the North Vietnamese soldiers arrive. He discovers that the apparent soldier living in the ward is a woman when two North Vietnamese soldiers try to rape her; he kills both. Dodger tells the woman to leave the base when the North Vietnamese regulars arrive, intending to make a final stand, but she convinces him to escape with him. Back in the U.S., McMurphy — now living in a trailer park on the outskirts of a Native American reservation in New Mexico — discovers alcoholic local Hector (guest star Jesse Borrego), has hit his son, giving him a black eye. Angered by the incident, McMurphy returns to the shop owner Joaquin (guest star Randolph Mantooth) and informs him that he reported Hector to the local authorities, who have no jurisdiction to investigate Hector. Joaquin admonishes McMurphy, telling her that Hector drinks to forget — much like McMurphy herself does. She confronts Hector on the side of the road, learning he too is a Vietnam veteran when he compares the effects of phosphorus to a mountain range in the distance. After an argument in Joaquin’s bar, McMurphy challenges Hector to a race: If he wins, he’ll get her car; if she wins, he must go to Santa Fe and seek help at the VA hospital for his alcoholism. McMurphy quits midway through the race, but Hector still agrees to get help and suggests that McMurphy do the same. Joaquin visits a drunk McMurphy that night, where she expresses a desire to remember, not forget, her time in Vietnam.
57	12	"The Always Goodbye"	Gary Sinise	Lydia Woodward	June 18, 1991	187052	12.0
In 1969, K.C. discovers McMurphy lounging in her Bangkok apartment, four months after K.C.’s departure from China Beach. On R&R before her tour’s impending end, McMurphy is joined by a smitten soldier, Maltby, who tells K.C. they’ve spent most of their trip drinking heavily. On their way out, the group is interrupted by Trieu Au returning with a two-year-old Karen, shocking McMurphy. At the bar she operates, K.C. is approached by Tucker, an old manager who wants to go into business with her — and bed her. He brings K.C. and McMurphy to the future site of her nightclub, where McMurphy questions the wisdom of K.C. raising her daughter and operating a nightclub in Bangkok — a sentiment shared by Trieu Au. McMurphy passes out before finishing a toast to the future and wakes K.C. with her vomiting the next morning. McMurphy confronts K.C. about leaving without saying goodbye, but K.C. snaps back that the rest of their friends at China Beach have moved on and she needs to as well. McMurphy reveals to K.C. that she fears returning to China Beach because her tour is about to end; unlike their friends, all trying to move on in the U.S., she does not want to. A resigned K.C. informs McMurphy that Trieu Au has taken Karen back to Vietnam and expresses an unwillingness to return for her or get involved in her life. Before she departs, McMurphy tells K.C. she intends to stop heavily drinking, while K.C. hopes to grow her nightclub and business interests. Struggling to find the right goodbye, the two happily recall the cheerleading sets they performed together on the first night of the Tet Offensive. In May 1975, K.C. returns to Bangkok after her ordeal in Saigon and finds her nightclub — and life — in ruins. She tells Tucker she intended on following Karen to the U.S. but now lacks the funds to purchase the plane ticket home. Tucker propositions her but K.C. declines, hoping to avoid a return to prostitution under him. Instead, she seeks out an old neighbor who sets her up with a seemingly mild customer, a computer specialist from Kansas City. However, she throws him out when he becomes aggressive. Sitting on the balcony outside her apartment (intercut throughout the episode), she grapples with her decision to put Karen on the helicopter in Saigon.
58	13	"Quest"	John Sacret Young	T : Angela Ventresca; S/T : John Sacret Young	June 25, 1991	187054	13.9
In a flashback to 1968, McMurphy is stunned when Dodger tells her he loves her before departing with baby Archie (seen in season 3’s “Souvenirs”). On Christmas Day 1976, McMurphy awakes to a phone call from K.C., an empty bottle of bourbon in her bed, and a scattering of pills and pill bottles on her bedside table. She retrieves K.C., sent back to the U.S. after a stint in a Bangkok jail, and bribes the officials for K.C.’s freedom. K.C., now penniless, promises to pay McMurphy back within a year. K.C. tells McMurphy that she was able to get Karen out of Vietnam and that she is living with Boonie; in Santa Cruz, California, the two witness Boonie picking Karen up from her school from afar. Uncertain of their next moves, the two go their separate ways, with McMurphy finally deciding to visit Dodger in Montana. She finds Dodger running a bar in his hometown, caring for Archie and his widowed father — also severely debilitated by a stroke — and converting an old school bus into a mobile ministry for veterans and refugees. She claims to him she has stopped drinking but quickly relents when he asks why she has visited. The next morning, after coming to on the bar, she is told by Archie that she reeks of alcohol. While working at the bar, McMurphy is accosted by a vet (the same drifter Dodger met in Season 3’s “The Thanks of a Grateful Nation”) who pulls a pistol; Dodger disarms him and counsels him on the loss he feels from Vietnam. McMurphy finally admits to Dodger that she too feels lost and asks to stay with him. The two finally act on their lingering feelings for one another and start a relationship. During a service in Dodger’s church bus, McMurphy admits that she had lost her way since returning from Vietnam and hit bottom the night before K.C.’s call, planning to commit suicide — thwarted when she drank her entire bottle of bourbon and passed out instead. Despite the revelation and Dodger’s companionship, her drinking continues. At Christmas 1977, McMurphy receives the promised payment and a photo from K.C., now running a successful restaurant. During the bar’s celebration, McMurphy snaps when the tree’s lights short out and tells Dodger she doesn’t fit in Montana. He chastises her for her drinking, causing her to slap him and tell him she hates him; he slaps her back and tells her loves her. When Dodger’s father has a stroke in the middle of the night, he asks McMurphy to drive the church bus to the hospital, but she dozes off and crashes the bus. Dodger’s father survives and the incident causes McMurphy to stop drinking as heavily, confirmed when Archie tells her she no longer smells of alcohol. In an emotional conversation with Dodger, she tells him she loves him, but is hurting him with her problems and she must leave to solve them on her own.
59	14	"Rewind"	Mimi Leder	John Wells & Carol Flint	July 9, 1991	187053	12.7
In 1985, Karen begins a series of man-on-the-street interviews asking strangers their opinions of the Vietnam War. While filming her bedroom (including the Snoopy stuffed animal she received in the Saigon embassy, now missing his right leg like Boonie), she recalls sleeping on the floor on her first night with Boonie in May 1975. Boonie watches one of Karen’s interviews and scoffs at the responses; put on the spot by Karen, he talks to her about his experiences in Vietnam for hours. Knowing Karen seeks answers about K.C., he puts her in touch with many of his old friends from China Beach. She starts with Beckett, now a high school teacher in North Carolina, where he describes killing the Viet Cong soldier while on patrol with Dodger (from the Season 3 episode "How To Stay Alive in Vietnam - Part 1"), shocking his students. Dodger discusses the long-lasting effects of war; Frankie thinks of her experience as a mistake, as the Army provided little clarity for her future and even less for her role in the military; Dr. Richard remembers the massive number of casualties that streamed through China Beach during the war; and Lila and Sarge Pepper talk about how the war is perceived as a loss and its effect on them. After asking Boonie about her real father, Karen seeks out Mac, now a general. Taken aback by the news that she is his daughter, he has little insight in the way of K.C., only commenting that she was “good in bed.” He offers her money to buy a car and apologizes before she departs. While asking the China Beach regulars their recollections of K.C., they encourage Karen to seek out K.C.’s family in Kansas City, Kansas. She tracks down K.C.’s younger sister, Maria (guest star Amy Steel), who reveals that from Vietnam, K.C. paid for her to attend a private school away from their abusive father — helping Maria avoid the sexual abuse that K.C. endured as a child. She visits Trieu Au, now living in the U.S. and working as a hairdresser. Trieu Au initially refuses to talk about the war but opens up to Karen and tells her she missed seeing Karen so much that she buried a jar with her picture in it to hide it from the Communist authorities. She also visits McMurphy, who struggles to tell Karen about the last time she saw K.C., in Santa Cruz watching Boonie pick up Karen. Boonie watches her interviews and is rendered speechless, but Karen tells him it is missing something. In the final scene, Karen gives a final monologue, directed at K.C., who she envisions as the audience for her project. In it, she tells K.C. she made good on her promises for a lawn and ice cream during the fall of Saigon and hopes she has found the success she was searching for.
60	15	"Through and Through"	Mimi Leder	Carol Flint	July 16, 1991	187055	11.1
In 1985, McMurphy, now married to Joe and living in Portland, Oregon, has a vivid flashback to an explosion at China Beach and its aftermath while watching Joe play racquetball at a gym. She seeks antidepressants from a therapist, disclosing that she has been sober for five years and her mother passed away two years prior. While talking to the therapist about her dog’s recent death, she conflates details about the dog’s death with the events from the explosion. After the visit with the therapist, she heads to a bar, where she orders and smells a shot of bourbon before pouring it into a pitcher but paying for it anyway—a regular agreement she has with the bartender. McMurphy visits the local VA office to join to a group for PTSD-afflicted veterans, where the counselor mistakes her for a spouse. Insulted, she leaves, but the counselor offers her a handshake apology. On a return visit to the therapist, she explains the flashback: In 1968, while moving injured soldiers with Jeff Hyers from the hospital ward to a bunker during a bombing, the bunker took a direct hit and was destroyed, killing everyone inside. However, some of the details remain murky to her. At home with Joe, she discusses her sessions with her therapist and her inability to get pregnant, concerned that due to her age and past, her window to have children has closed. In a VA session where she is the only woman in attendance, she describes the anguish she carries from lying to dying soldiers that they would pull through. Later, when the therapist asks why she is no longer attending the VA sessions, McMurphy says she believes her time in therapy is over. She argues with the therapist about Joe, revealing that due to her father’s health problems she fears him suffering an early heart attack and storms out. From a note on the fridge, McMurphy discovers that Joe — bruised and sore from a racquetball tournament — has talked with Dr. Richard. Furious that they talked, she lashes out at Joe, calling him a child and destroying his drum set. She heads to the bar, but with her usual bartender out, she relapses and begins drinking. The therapist collects her from the bar, telling her she is trying to handle too much at once but she and Joe are there to help her. At her VA physical the next day, she bonds with elderly vets who humorously preach patience for their ailments, giving her a new outlook. In a final session with her therapist, McMurphy finally remembers the rest of the flashback. She had left the bunker to find Hyers, who had run to the Jet Set to get beer for the injured; after witnessing the explosion, Hyers prevented her from returning to the bunker site until the shelling stopped, likely saving her life. After uncovering the corpse of one soldier, she blamed Hyers for their deaths, which strained their relationship to the point that she never spoke to him again before he died a few weeks later (in the Season 3 episode "How To Stay Alive in Vietnam - Part 1"). Asked by the therapist what she would say to Hyers given the chance, she says she would have told him she was sorry, then asks the therapist if her grief and guilt will ever stop.
61	16	"Hello Goodbye"	John Sacret Young	S : John Sacret Young & Lydia Woodward & Carol Flint; S/T : John Wells	July 22, 1991	187056	16.3
In February 1988, the veterans of China Beach attend a reunion in Youngstown, Ohio. The party attended by Boonie, Linda, and Karen, who conducts interviews during the reunion; McMurphy, Joe, and their two-year-old daughter Maggie; Beckett and his teenage son Malcolm; Dodger and Archie; Lila and Sarge Pepper; Frankie; Wayloo Marie, now a famous daytime talk show host; and Dr. Richard and Colleen, who tells Karen in an interview that she suspects Richard of having an affair with his receptionist. Karen is disappointed when K.C. skips the reunion, despite being invited by McMurphy. During her interview with Karen, McMurphy recalls her final day in Vietnam in late 1969, when she gathered sand from the beach and where Dr. Singer and Gloria Dawn threw her a going home costume party. The party was interrupted when a tank crashed through the front of the hospital ward. She bonds with an injured soldier nicknamed Lurch (guest star Neal McDonough), whom the medical staff determine will quickly bleed out and die once the pneumatic pants he is wearing are removed. Richard discusses his love for McMurphy and how his career feels insignificant compared to the time he saved lives in Vietnam, reminiscing to a moment when he, Beckett, and McMurphy buried unidentified body parts in a ceremony on the beach (first seen in “Juice”). Wayloo Marie says she is grateful for her experience, as it changed her for the better. Dodger, still in love with McMurphy, recalls her departure from his hometown in 1977 and joins Frankie on-stage to sing “When a Man Loves a Woman.” Sarge Pepper compares his experience in World War II among educated and well-off enlisted men to his time in Vietnam, spent entirely alongside drafted soldiers from poor and destitute backgrounds. Lila, who talks about the strength of their marriage, reveals that Sarge Pepper has terminal lung cancer. Dodger and Boonie are interviewed together, but Dodger inadvertently insults Boonie when he makes light of Boonie’s accident and his belief that there were no heroes in Vietnam. Later, he tells Boonie and McMurphy that he feared attending the reunion, worried it would stir up bad memories, but he understands now that those memories — and his friends — will always be a part of him. As the reunion ends, the group decides to travel to Washington D.C. to visit the Vietnam War memorial. While driving to Washington, Karen asks McMurphy about the soldier she treated on her final day; McMurphy recalls transcribing his emotional final letter and kissing him before he died, then departing the next day and realizing that nothing had changed. The group arrives at the Vietnam memorial, stirring deep emotions. Boonie visits K.C., now a Washington-based executive of a company with business interests in Asia. K.C. asks him if he needs money, but he says he no longer needs her help and implores her to visit Karen. K.C. tells him Karen was better off with Boonie, but he responds that it was always about what K.C. wanted, never about Karen, and he hoped she found what she had been looking for. As the group shares emotional goodbyes, K.C. appears and reunites with Karen. The two talk, with Karen asking her to keep in contact and if she got everything she wanted, to which K.C. replies that she got “most of it.” The two share a hug and K.C. departs again and promises to keep in touch. McMurphy brings Maggie to the memorial wall and pours out the sand from China Beach. Finishing her interview with Karen, she remembers the name of the dying soldier from her memory, Lawrence F. McClintock of Littleton, Colorado, just like he said she would. In her last words, she tells Karen, “I couldn’t save them all, but I saved some.” The finale is intercut with clips from previous episodes illustrating the memories and monologues of each character. The finale was split into two parts in syndication, but returned to a single episode in the 2013 DVD release.
