= Patricia Green =

American television producer and writer

Patricia Green is an American television producer and writer.

== Career ==
Green worked as a writer and producer on Cagney & Lacey and won two Emmy Awards for her work on the series. The first was in 1985 for Outstanding Writing for a Drama Series. The second was in 1986 for Outstanding Drama Series. She became a supervising producer and writer on China Beach. In 1989 she won a Humanitas Prize for her work on China Beach and was also nominated for an Emmy Award.

She moved on to become a writer and supervising producer for L.A. Law in 1990. She was promoted to executive producer after one season. She was nominated for an Emmy Award for writing in 1991 for her work on the L.A. Law episode "Mutinies On The Banzai". She then became a writer and producer for Chicago Hope and was again nominated for best drama series at the 1996 Emmy Awards. Green also developed Christy (1994–95), which included a major role for Cagney & Lacey co-star Tyne Daly.

She became a consulting producer for The District in 2002.

== Awards and nominations ==
Year	Awarding body	Category	Result	Work	Notes	Ref.
1996	Emmy Award	Outstanding Drama Series	Nominated	Chicago Hope	Shared with fellow producers David E. Kelley, John Tinker, Michael Dinner, Bill D'Elia, James C. Hart, Kevin Arkadie, John Heath, Rob Corn	
1992	Emmy Award	Outstanding Drama Series	Nominated	L.A. Law	Shared with fellow producers Rick Wallace, Steven Bochco, Alan Brennert, Carol Flint, Elodie Keene, James C. Hart, Robert Breech, Don Behrns	
1991	Emmy Award	Outstanding Drama Series	Won	L.A. Law	Shared with fellow producers Rick Wallace, David E. Kelley, John Hill, Robert Breech, James C. Hart, Elodie Keene, Alan Brennert, Alice West	
1991	Emmy Award	Outstanding Writing for a Drama Series	Nominated	L.A. Law episode "Mutinies On The Banzai"	Shared with co-writers Alan Brennert and David E. Kelley	
1989	Emmy Award	Outstanding Drama Series	Nominated	China Beach	Shared with fellow producers John Sacret Young, John Wells, Gino Escarrega, Christopher Nelson and Fred Gerber	
1989	Humanitas Prize	60 Minute Category	Won	China Beach		
1986	Emmy Award	Outstanding Drama Series	Won	Cagney & Lacey	Shared with fellow producers Barney Rozenwig, Liz Coe, Ralph S. Singleton, Steve Brown and P. K. Nelman	
1985	Emmy Award	Outstanding Writing for a Drama Series	Won	Cagney & Lacey episode "Who Said It's Fair", part II		
