= China Beach =

American television series (1988–1991)

- Genre: Medical drama; War
- Created by: William Broyles Jr.; John Sacret Young
- Inspired by: Home Before Morning by Lynda Van Devanter
- Starring: Dana Delany; Nan Woods; Michael Boatman; Marg Helgenberger; Robert Picardo; Tim Ryan; Concetta Tomei; Brian Wimmer; Jeff Kober; Chloe Webb; Megan Gallagher; Nancy Giles; Ned Vaughn; Troy Evans; Ricki Lake
- Theme music composer: Holland-Dozier-Holland
- Opening theme: "Reflections"; Performed by Diana Ross & the Supremes
- Country of origin: United States
- Original language: English
- No. of seasons: 4
- No. of episodes: 62 (list of episodes)

Production
- Executive producer: John Sacret Young
- Producers: Geno Escarrega; Mimi Leder; John Wells; Fred Gerber; Carol Flint; John Lugar; Lydia Woodward
- Running time: 47–48 minutes
- Production companies: Sacret, Inc.; Warner Bros. Television

Original release
- Network: ABC
- Release: April 27, 1988 – July 22, 1991

China Beach is an American war drama television series set at an evacuation hospital during the Vietnam War. The title refers to My Khe Beach in the city of Đà Nẵng, Vietnam, nicknamed "China Beach" in English by American and Australian soldiers during the Vietnam War. The series initially ran on ABC for four seasons from April 27, 1988, to July 22, 1991.

== Overview ==
Created by William Broyles Jr. and John Sacret Young, the series looks at the Vietnam War from the perspectives of the women, military personnel, and civilians who were present during the conflict. John Wells and Lydia Woodward joined the writing staff for China Beach beginning with the second season. Many of the show's cast members appeared later on another Wells production, ER.

Set at the fictitious 510th Evacuation Hospital and R&R facility (the "Five-and-Dime"), the series' cast of characters includes US Army doctors and nurses, officers, soldiers, Red Cross volunteers, and civilian personnel (American, French, and Vietnamese). The series also features the experiences of the characters when they return to the United States, either on leave or at the end of their tours of duty. The show does not shy away from showing the brutality of war; it provides a gritty view of the experience and its aftermath.

The show was inspired in part by the book Home Before Morning (1983) written by the former U.S. Army Nurse Lynda Van Devanter. The show's character Nurse Colleen McMurphy roughly follows Van Devanter's experiences as a nurse in Vietnam. The book relates Van Devanter's wish to serve her country, the adventure she thought her deployment to Vietnam would be, her culture shock upon returning to "the States", and her struggles with PTSD. The show was cancelled before it could fully address McMurphy's PTSD issues. Van Devanter died in 2002.

== Cast ==
Season three China Beach cast (left to right): Ned Vaughn (Jeff Hyers), Ricki Lake (Holly Pelegrino), Michael Boatman (Sam Beckett), Dana Delany (Nurse Colleen McMurphy), Brian Wimmer (Boonie Lanier), Marg Helgenberger (K.C.), Jeff Kober (Dodger), Nancy Giles (Frankie Bunsen), Concetta Tomei (Lila Garreau), and Robert Picardo (Dr. Richard)

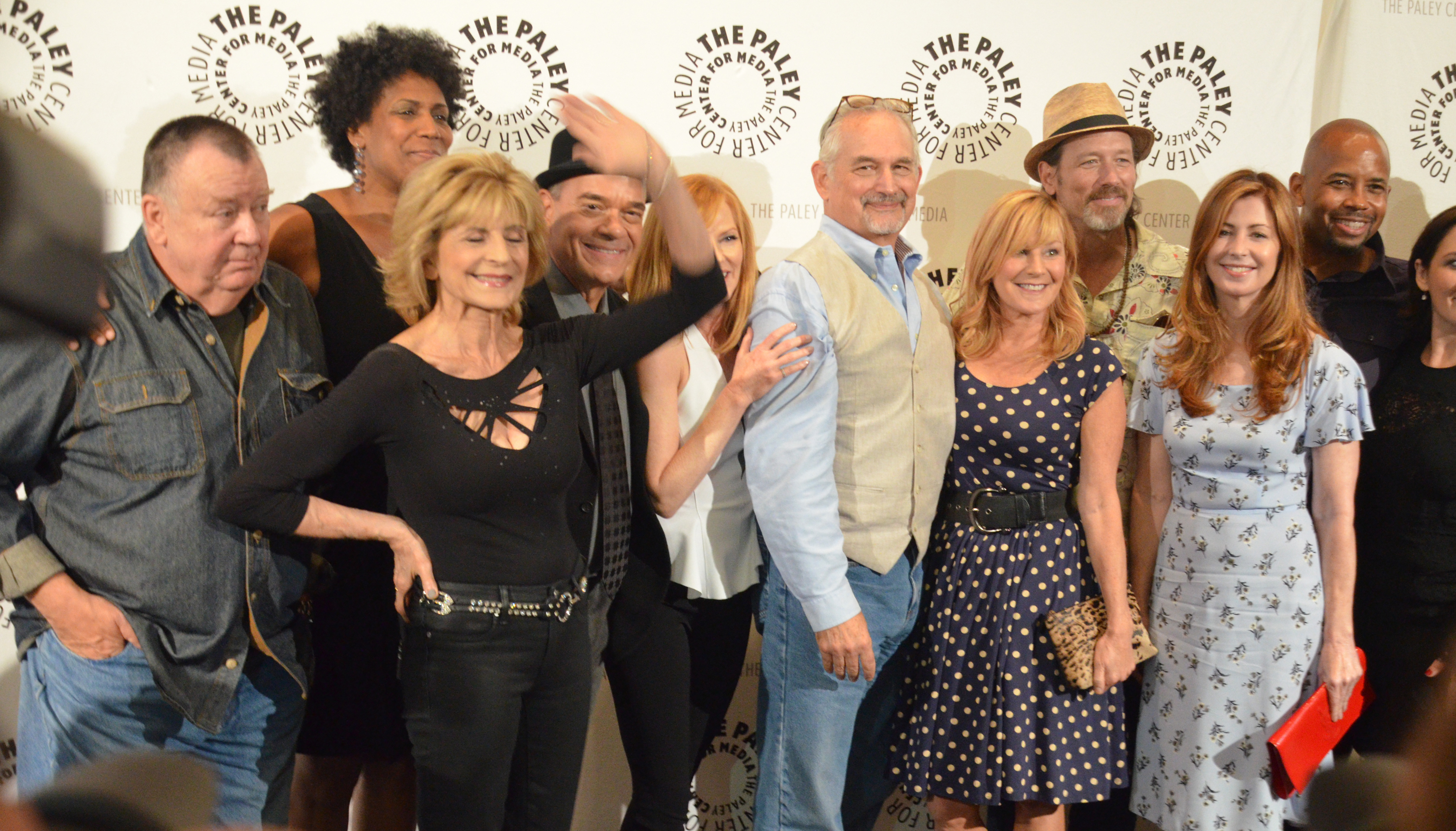
Cast of China Beach in September 2013

- Dana Delany as First Lieutenant (later Captain) Colleen McMurphy, USA – a Catholic girl from Lawrence, Kansas, and army nurse with the 510th Evac Hospital in Vietnam during the late 1960s. A composite of various real-life Vietnam War nurses, the character illustrates her courage, kindness, and sacrifices during the war, as well as the severe emotional scarring of noncombatant personnel during and following military service; several episodes feature the veterans in their own words, intercut with the storyline. Delany won two Emmy awards for the role.
- Nan Woods as Cherry White (seasons 1–2) – a naive Red Cross volunteer ("Doughnut Dolly") from Iowa, she comes to China Beach to search for her brother Rick, a Marine infantryman, who was reported missing in action (MIA). She dies midway through the second season during the Tet Offensive in January 1968.
- Michael Boatman as SP5 Samuel Beckett, USA – a draftee and a preacher's son from North Carolina, he works in the graves registration unit at China Beach. His job makes him unpopular with most of the other servicemen.
- Marg Helgenberger as Karen Charlene "K.C." Koloski – a cynical part-time prostitute and civilian volunteer, she comes to China Beach seeking to make her own wealth and fortune.
- Robert Picardo as Captain Dick Richard, USA – a head surgeon dealing with being drafted into the Army and away from his family, he worked as an OB-GYN when he was a civilian.
- Tim Ryan as Captain Bartholomew "Natch" Austen, USAF (regular in season 1; recurring in season 2) – a jet fighter pilot and McMurphy's love interest.
- Concetta Tomei as Major Lila Garreau, USA – a World War II veteran, she is the career Army commanding officer of China Beach.
- Brian Wimmer as Corporal Boonwell "Boonie" Lanier, USMC – the friendly China Beach lifeguard and manager of the Jet Set Club.
- Jeff Kober as Staff Sergeant Evan "Dodger" Winslow, USMC – a moody Marine Force Reconnaissance operative, he serves and fights in the jungle mainly to keep other servicemen in his platoon alive. He constantly displays the "thousand-yard stare", a blank facial expression common among soldiers who have seen too much death and destruction in battle. He is a friend of Boonie, McMurphy, and Cherry.
- Chloe Webb as Laurette Barber (season 1) – a USO singer from Paoli, Pennsylvania, she is determined to make it big.
- Megan Gallagher as Airman Wayloo Marie Holmes, USAF (season 2) – a reporter for the Armed Services Network, she is seeking a career as a world-famous reporter.
- Nancy Giles as Private Franklin "Frankie" Bunsen, USA (seasons 2–4) – a female private, she was assigned to the China Beach motor pool.
- Ned Vaughn as Specialist Jeff Hyers, USA (season 3; guest appearances in seasons 2 and 4) – a good-natured combat medic from Georgia, he is killed in action midway through the third season during a routine patrol.
- Troy Evans as Master Sergeant Bob Pepper, USA (seasons 3–4) – a World War II veteran, he is a driver, mechanic, and non-commissioned officer in charge of the motor pool. He becomes romantically involved with Lila Garreau, whom he later marries.
- Ricki Lake as Holly "Donut Dolly" Pelegrino (season 3) – a sharp-witted Red Cross volunteer.

== Episodes ==
Over four seasons from 1988 to 1991, the series aired 61 episodes and one pilot movie.

Season	Episodes	Originally released	
Season	Episodes	First released	Last released
Pilot	1	April 26, 1988	
1	6	April 27, 1988	June 8, 1988
2	17	November 30, 1988	May 3, 1989
3	22	September 20, 1989	April 30, 1990
4	16	September 29, 1990	July 22, 1991

== Production ==
The title sequence theme song was "Reflections" by Diana Ross and the Supremes (the episode "Phoenix" instead used "We Gotta Get Out of This Place" by Eric Burdon with Katrina and the Waves).

== Reception ==
China Beach was a critically lauded, but poorly rated series. ABC persisted with the show for four seasons, but the final season was put on hiatus in December 1990 and did not air its finale until July 22, 1991. As a result of the scheduling, Dana Delany was eligible for (and ultimately won) a Best Actress Emmy Award in August 1992, a year after the series broadcast its final episode and over a year and a half after many of the scenes were filmed.

== Awards and nominations ==
Awards and nominations for China Beach
Year	Award	Category	Recipient	Result
1989	Casting Society of America's Artios Award	Best Casting for TV, Dramatic Episodic	Phyllis Huffman and John Frank Levey	Nominated
1990	Casting Society of America's Artios Award	Best Casting for TV, Dramatic Episodic	John Frank Levey	Nominated
1991	Casting Society of America's Artios Award	Best Casting for TV, Dramatic Episodic	John Frank Levey	Nominated
1989	Directors Guild of America Award	Outstanding Directorial Achievement in Dramatic Specials	Rod Holcomb (for the pilot episode)	Nominated
1990	Golden Globe Award	Best Television Series – Drama		Won
1990	Golden Globe Award	Best Actress – Television Series Drama	Dana Delany	Nominated
1991	Golden Globe Award	Best Television Series – Drama		Nominated
1991	Golden Globe Award	Best Actress – Television Series Drama	Dana Delany	Nominated
1991	Golden Globe Award	Best Supporting Actress – Series, Miniseries or Television Film	Marg Helgenberger	Nominated
1989	Humanitas Prize	60-minute Category	Patricia Green	Won
1989	Humanitas Prize	60-minute Category	John Sacret Young and William Broyles Jr. (for episode "Lost and Found")	Nominated
1990	Humanitas Prize	60-minute Category	John Wells (for episode "Dear China Beach")	Nominated
1990	Humanitas Prize	60-minute Category	Georgia Jeffries (for episode "How to Stay Alive in Vietnam: Part I")	Nominated
1991	Humanitas Prize	60-minute Category	John Wells (for episode "One Small Step")	Nominated
1992	Humanitas Prize	90-minute Category	John Wells, John Sacret Young, Carol Flint, and Lydia Woodward	Nominated
1988	Motion Picture Sound Editors' Golden Reel Award	Best Sound Editing Television Pilots and Specials	Greg Stacy and Sync-Pop	Won
1990	Peabody Award		ABC Television and Sacret Inc., in association with Warner Bros. Television (for episode "Vets")	Won
1989	People's Choice Award	Favorite New TV Dramatic Program		Won
1988	Primetime Emmy Award	Outstanding Writing for a Drama Series	John Sacret Young (for the pilot episode)	Nominated
1988	Primetime Emmy Award	Outstanding Directing for a Drama Series	Rod Holcomb (for the pilot episode)	Nominated
1988	Primetime Emmy Award	Outstanding Editing for a Series - Single Camera Production	Erwin Dumbrille and Christopher Nelson (for the pilot episode)	Nominated
1988	Primetime Emmy Award	Outstanding Costuming for a Series	Paula Lynn Kaatz and Darryl Levine (for the pilot episode)	Won
1989	Primetime Emmy Award	Outstanding Drama Series	John Sacret Young, John Wells, Patricia Green, Geno Escarrega, Christopher Nelson, and Fred Gerber	Nominated
1989	Primetime Emmy Award	Outstanding Lead Actress in a Drama Series	Dana Delany (for episode "The World")	Won
1989	Primetime Emmy Award	Outstanding Guest Actress in a Drama Series	Chloe Webb (for episode "Chao Ong")	Nominated
1989	Primetime Emmy Award	Outstanding Editing for a Series - Single Camera Production	Randy Jon Morgan (for episode "Vets")	Nominated
1989	Primetime Emmy Award	Outstanding Achievement in Costuming for a Series	Paula Lynn Kaatz and Darryl Levine (for episode "The World: Part II")	Nominated
1989	Primetime Emmy Award	Outstanding Sound Mixing for a Drama Series	Tim Cooney, Don Cahn, Artie Torgersen, and James G. Williams (for episode "Vets")	Nominated
1990	Primetime Emmy Award	Outstanding Drama Series	John Sacret Young, John Wells, Georgia Jeffries, Mimi Leder, Fred Gerber, and Geno Escarrega	Nominated
1990	Primetime Emmy Award	Outstanding Lead Actress in a Drama Series	Dana Delany	Nominated
1990	Primetime Emmy Award	Outstanding Supporting Actress in a Drama Series	Marg Helgenberger (for episodes "The Unquiet Earth", "Skin Deep", "Nightfall")	Won
1990	Primetime Emmy Award	Outstanding Guest Actress in a Drama Series	Ruby Dee (for episode "Skylark")	Nominated
1990	Primetime Emmy Award	Outstanding Editing for a Series - Single Camera Production	Susan B. Browdy (for episode "The Unquiet Earth")	Nominated
1990	Primetime Emmy Award	Outstanding Costuming for a Series	Paula Lynn Kaatz and Le Dawson (for episode "Magic")	Nominated
1990	Primetime Emmy Award	Outstanding Sound Mixing for a Drama Series	Lowell Harris, Don Cahn, Artie Torgersen, and Jim Cook (for episode "F.N.G.")	Won
1991	Primetime Emmy Award	Outstanding Drama Series	John Sacret Young, John Wells, Mimi Leder, Lydia Woodward, Carol Flint, and Geno Escarrega	Nominated
1991	Primetime Emmy Award	Outstanding Lead Actress in a Drama Series	Dana Delany (for episode "Fever")	Nominated
1991	Primetime Emmy Award	Outstanding Supporting Actress in a Drama Series	Marg Helgenberger (for episodes "History, Part II - She Sells More Than Sea Shells", "100 Klicks Out")	Nominated
1991	Primetime Emmy Award	Outstanding Directing for a Drama Series	Mimi Leder (for episode "You, Babe")	Nominated
1991	Primetime Emmy Award	Outstanding Guest Actress in a Drama Series	Penny Fuller (for episode "Fever")	Nominated
1991	Primetime Emmy Award	Outstanding Costuming for a Series	Paula Lynn Kaatz and Le Dawson (for episode "Juice")	Nominated
1992	Primetime Emmy Award	Outstanding Lead Actress in a Drama Series	Dana Delany (for episode "Through and Through")	Won
1992	Primetime Emmy Award	Outstanding Supporting Actress in a Drama Series	Marg Helgenberger (for episodes "100 Klicks Out", "The Always Goodbye")	Nominated
1992	Primetime Emmy Award	Outstanding Writing for a Drama Series	John Wells, John Sacret Young, Carol Flint, and Lydia Woodward (for episode "Hello Goodbye")	Nominated
1992	Primetime Emmy Award	Outstanding Directing for a Drama Series	Mimi Leder (for episode "Rewind")	Nominated
1992	Primetime Emmy Award	Outstanding Costuming for a Series	Paula Lynn Kaatz and Thomas S. Dawson (for episode "Hello Goodbye")	Nominated
1992	Primetime Emmy Award	Outstanding Sound Mixing for a Drama Series	Lowell Harris, Don Cahn, Artie Torgersen, and Jim Cook (for episode "Hello Goodbye")	Nominated
1989	Television Critics Association Award	Outstanding Achievement in Drama		Nominated
1989	Viewers for Quality Television Award	Best Quality Drama Series		Won
1989	Viewers for Quality Television Award	Best Actress in a Quality Drama Series	Dana Delany	Won
1989	Viewers for Quality Television Award	Best Supporting Actress in a Quality Drama Series	Marg Helgenberger	Won
1989	Viewers for Quality Television Award	Best Writing in a Quality Drama Series		Won
1990	Viewers for Quality Television Award	Best Quality Drama Series		Won
1990	Viewers for Quality Television Award	Best Actress in a Quality Drama Series	Dana Delany	Won
1990	Viewers for Quality Television Award	Best Supporting Actor in a Quality Drama Series	Robert Picardo	Nominated
1990	Viewers for Quality Television Award	Best Supporting Actress in a Quality Drama Series	Marg Helgenberger	Won
1990	Viewers for Quality Television Award	Best Writing in a Quality Drama Series		Won
1990	Viewers for Quality Television Award	Best Directing in a Quality Drama Series		Won
1991	Viewers for Quality Television Award	Best Quality Drama Series		Won
1991	Viewers for Quality Television Award	Best Actress in a Quality Drama Series	Dana Delany	Won
1991	Viewers for Quality Television Award	Best Supporting Actress in a Quality Drama Series	Marg Helgenberger	Won
1991	Viewers for Quality Television Award	Best Writing in a Quality Drama Series		Won
1991	Viewers for Quality Television Award	Founder's Award	Robert Picardo	Won
1989	Writers Guild of America Award	Episodic Drama	William Broyles Jr. (for episode "Home")	Nominated
1990	Writers Guild of America Award	Episodic Drama	Alan Brennert (for episode "Where the Boys Are")	Nominated
1990	Writers Guild of America Award	Episodic Drama	John Wells (for episode "X-Mas Chnbch VN '67")	Nominated
1991	Writers Guild of America Award	Episodic Drama	John Sacret Young (for episode "Souvenirs")	Won
1991	Writers Guild of America Award	Episodic Drama	Martin M. Goldstein, Neal Baer, and Dottie Dartland (for episode "Warriors")	Nominated
1992	Writers Guild of America Award	Episodic Drama	Paris Qualles, John Sacret Young, John Wells, Carol Flint, and Lydia Woodward (for episode "Escape")	Nominated
1992	Writers Guild of America Award	Episodic Drama	John Wells, John Sacret Young, Carol Flint, and Lydia Woodward (for episode "Hello Goodbye")	Nominated

== Syndication ==
China Beach debuted in rerun syndication on Lifetime, on November 4, 1991.

== Home media ==
Before being released on DVD, the series's only home video release was the 97-minute pilot movie on Warner Home Video in 1990 (cat no. 11971).

Series Complete Collection Set cover

In December 2012, it was announced that the series, among the most-requested television shows not available through either VHS or DVD following its broadcast run, would be issued on DVD in a box set (including new interviews with cast members and various bonus features) and released on April 15, 2013, through StarVista Entertainment (affiliated with TimeLife). The collection includes 302 songs heard during the series. To mark the show's 25th anniversary, a 21-disc collector's set was released October 1, 2013.

Music rights long delayed the release on DVD. More than 250 songs were licensed; seventeen could not be, and were either deleted or replaced.

The complete series began streaming on some services in the mid-2020's and received a complete digital release for purchase on sites like Apple and VUDU in late August 2026. Although the episodes were remastered in HD for digital release, rights issues prevented the use of the original soundtrack, leading to much of the music being replaced with alternative period recordings from Fervor Records.

== Possible follow-up novel ==
John Sacret Young stated before the show's October 2013 DVD release that he was working on a follow-up novel, titled Reflections, in which Colleen, now in her 60s and recently widowed, returned to Vietnam and reconnected with the retired Dick Richard and venture capitalist K.C. Koloski. Young had also hoped to adapt it into a TV movie. However, the novel was never published.

== See also ==
- Tour of Duty, a similar series also set in South Vietnam during the war
