= Paula Lynn Kaatz =

American costume designer

- Born: January 19, 1946; Chicago, Illinois, U.S.
- Died: May 3, 2013 (aged 67); California, U.S.
- Education: University of California, Santa Barbara
- Occupation: Costume designer

Paula Lynn Kaatz (January 19, 1946 – May 3, 2013) was an American costume designer. She won two Primetime Emmy Awards and was nominated for three more in the category Outstanding Costumes for her work on the television program China Beach, and the television film Pancho Barnes.

Kaatz died in California on May 3, 2013, at the age of 67.
