= Home Before Morning =

1983 memoir by Lynda Van Devanter

Home Before Morning: The Story of an Army Nurse in Vietnam
- 1st US hardcover edition
- Author: Lynda Van Devanter
- Language: English
- Genre: Memoir
- Published: 1983
- Publisher: Beaufort Books
- Publication place: United States
- ISBN: 1-55849-298-4

Home Before Morning: The Story of an Army Nurse in Vietnam is a memoir written by American writer Lynda Van Devanter in 1983. The memoir, originally published by Beaufort Books, explores Van Devanter's experience as a nurse during the Vietnam War. It was adapted into a popular TV show, China Beach, which ran from 1988 to 1991.

== Background ==
Lynda Van Devanter was born on May 27, 1947, in Washington, D.C., and grew up in suburban Washington with four sisters. She spent her childhood and young adult life in a patriotic and Catholic household. She obtained a diploma in nursing at the Mercy Hospital School of Nursing in Baltimore, Maryland in 1968. Near the end of nursing school, she attended a presentation about serving in Vietnam as a nurse. She decided to serve for one year abroad in Vietnam in the name of protecting democracy. She remarks in her memoir Home Before Morning, "if our boys were being blown apart, then somebody better be over there putting them back together again. I started to think that maybe that somebody should be me".

After graduating from basic training at a Texas army base in 1969, Van Devanter traveled to serve in Vietnam. She served for a year in the province of Pleiku, a combat-heavy area, at the 71st Evacuation Hospital.

She returned to the United States in June 1970, and eventually joined the organization Vietnam Veterans of America (VVA), where she received support from others struggling to reintegrate into American society. She pursued a diploma in psychology, where she studied post-traumatic stress disorder (PTSD), a mental health condition common to veterans that arises after exposure to traumatic events. Like many veterans, she had also experienced the depression, flashbacks, night sweats, and angry outbursts described by the presentation of PTSD. She reasoned that others were likely experiencing similar effects from war exposure. In 1980, Van Devanter founded the VVA Women's Project to offer a space for women veterans to come together and support one another. Lynda Van Devanter died of systemic vascular disease at her home in Herndon, Virginia, on November 15, 2002.

== Summary ==
The book contrasts the carefree "all-American girl" who is ready to take on the world in service to her country with the Vietnam War veteran who struggles to reintegrate into an America that seems to have continued on without her. The first few chapters accompany Van Devanter in her journey to choosing nursing as a career and attending a clinically intensive program called Mercy Hospital School of Nursing. With great pride, her best friend and she enrolled in the United States Army to use their nursing skills in service of their country. Over her year-long service in Vietnam, Van Devanter's perception of the war shifted from a noble fight in the name of democracy and freedom to a senseless massacre of young soldiers and an invasion into the lives of Vietnamese people. Van Devanter was stationed at the 71st Evacuation Hospital (71st Evac) in Pleiku, Vietnam, "an area of heavy combat and the casualties were supposedly unending". She uses the letters exchanged with her family back home to tangibly capture the emotional toll of the war throughout her year-long tour in Vietnam. The majority of the memoir investigates Van Devanter's experience as a healthcare professional at one of the highest-casualty bases in the Vietnam War, detailing the carnage of war and the surgical work required to treat the injured soldiers. The final chapters close with a difficult transition back into American life marked by personal and professional barriers to living the normal life she had once dreamed about as a child.

== Themes ==
The traditional military view of nurses understood their role as affectionate caregivers who exemplify stereotypical feminine roles. Through her book, Van Devanter revealed another narrative about nurses and women who served in Vietnam, one that presented them as imperfect yet resilient, heroic, and courageous. Home Before Morning argues that only a select few return from war triumphant and victorious, while the vast majority either return broken and scarred or do not return at all.

Van Devanter dedicated her memoir to "all of the unknown women who served forgotten in their wars".

== TV series adaptation - China Beach ==
In 1988, Home Before Morning was adapted into a television series called China Beach, based on Van Devanter's experience as a nurse at an emergency hospital during the Vietnam War. The show ran for four seasons on the ABC network before being canceled in 1991.

The show's character Nurse Colleen McMurphy, played by Dana Delany, roughly follows Van Devanter's experiences as a nurse in Vietnam. The book takes the reader from Van Devanter's wish to serve her country through the adventure she thought her deployment to Vietnam would be, her culture shock upon returning to the US, and her struggles with PTSD. The show was cancelled before it could fully address McMurphy's PTSD issues. Van Devanter died in 2002.

== Reception ==
Some Americans related to Van Devanter's memoir, especially those who had served as nurses alongside her in Vietnam. Some veteran nurses and women felt encouraged to speak up about their own experiences during the war, acting to help spread a narrative of war that extended beyond soldiers and battle. An anonymous supporter of the memoir said, "she (Lynda Van Devanter) helped me see that others had experienced what I did and were hurting like I was. Her story and mine are the same and people need to hear this because war is hell". The positive reception of the book caught the attention of Sally Field's production company, Fogwood Films, under the umbrella of Columbia Pictures, which planned to portray the memoir in a feature film. With the risk of Home Before Morning becoming a blockbuster film and further shaping Americans' view of women in military service, critics became increasingly vocal against the book's portrayal of nurses.

Critics said that the book negatively represented nurses and other healthcare professionals who served in the Vietnam War and any other wars prior. Other veteran nurses criticized the book by expressing how their own experience was vastly different from that of Van Devanter and that Van Devanter exaggerated the presence of vices and the extent of casualties. One chief nurse named Catherine Betz offered her harsh critique in an interview, saying, "Van DeVanter's crazy, absolutely. She dreamed up this stuff". The US military and American veterans now struggled to define the image of military women and nurses, and Home Before Morning was to blame. Of all the critics, a nurse anesthetist named Patricia L. Walsh who served at a civilian hospital of the United States Agency for International Development in Da Nang was the loudest and most persistent.

Walsh created a small organization called Nurses Against Misrepresentation (NAM) to both deny negative portrayals of nurses in Vietnam and to prevent the motion-picture adaptation of Home Before Morning from release. In an interview for The New York Times in 1985, Walsh said that "We (NAM) didn't challenge her until the announcement was made that Sally Field was going to make it into a big picture", suggesting that NAM was not against Van Devanter's telling of her personal experience, but rather against Van Devanter's personal experience becoming the experience of all nurses who served in Vietnam. Walsh was concerned that Van Devanter's descriptions of antiwar ideals, affairs, and drug and alcohol use would taint the image of nursing. Additionally, NAM claimed that Van Devanter's descriptions of endless casualties and long hours were unrealistic. They were worried that American families who had lost their loved ones in the war would feel like their relatives died because of exhausted and intoxicated healthcare staff. This risk would be magnified if the movie portrayed scenes of healthcare professionals rushing from a party to provide medical care after drinking alcohol and smoking marihuana. NAM further argued that it would propagate the stereotype of the "drug-crazed, freaked out Viet Nam vet". A nurse named Marra Peche, who had served with Van Devanter at the 71st Evac Hospital, spoke to defend the memoir, saying that it told the truth. She says, "I know surgeons who would work stoned. It's not the fact that there was drinking on duty, but that we were on duty 24 hours a day". In protest of the book becoming a movie, Walsh encouraged NAM to send as many letters of protest as possible to Columbia Pictures to prevent filming. In 1987, Columbia Pictures dropped the film for "script problems". Though not absolutely provable, the cancelation of the film was likely influenced by NAM's persistent criticism.
