= Fred Gerber =

American film director

- Occupation(s): Film director, television director, television producer
- Years active: 1970–present

Fred Gerber is an American film and television director and television producer. Gerber has directed several popular television series which include The X-Files, Desperate Housewives and House. Gerber has also served as a producer on China Beach, Threat Matrix, Family Law and The Lying Game.

== Filmography ==
- Witches of East End (2013) TV series
  - episode 1.03 "A Few Good Talismen"
- Haven (2010–11) TV series
  - episode 1.13 "Spiral"
  - episode 2.06 "Audery Parker's Day Off"
- The Lying Game (2011–13) TV series
  - episode 1.06 "Bad Boys Break Hearts"
  - episode 1.11 "O Twin, Where Art Thou?"
  - episode 1.14 "Black and White and Green All Over"
  - episode 1.20 "Unholy Matrimony"
  - episode 2.01 "The Revengers"
  - episode 2.10 "To Lie For"
- The Inside (2005) TV series
  - episode 1.07 "Declawed"
- House (2004) TV series
  - episode 1.16 "Heavy"
  - episode 2.06 "Spin"
  - episode 2.17 "All In"
- Desperate Housewives (2004) TV series
  - episode 1.06 "Running to Stand Still"
  - episode 1.08 "Guilty"
  - episode 1.10 "Come Back to Me"
- North Shore (2004) TV series
  - episode 1.20 "Ex-Games, The"
- Threat Matrix (2003) TV Series
- Hack (2002) TV series
- Family Law (1999) TV series
  - episode 1.03 "All God's Creatures"
  - episode 1.06 "Nanny, The"
  - episode 1.09 "Holt vs. Holt"
  - episode 1.13 "Human Error"
  - episode 1.17 "Metamorphosis"
  - episode 1.19 "Playing God"
  - episode 1.21 "Second Chance"
  - episode 2.02 "One Mistake"
  - episode 2.03 "Affairs of State"
  - episode 2.04 "Going Home"
  - episode 2.10 "Generations"
  - episode 2.13 "Separation"
  - episode 2.16 "Liar's Club: Part 2"
  - episode 2.22 "Recovery"
  - episode 3.01 "Irreparable Harm"
  - episode 3.02 "Moving On"
  - episode 3.05 "Against All Odds"
  - episode 3.08 "Security"
  - episode 3.13 "To Protect and to Serve"
  - episode 3.16 "Celano v. Foster"
  - episode 3.17 "Big Brother"
  - episode 3.19 "Admissions"
  - episode 3.21 "Alienation of Affection"
- Judging Amy (1999) TV Series
  - episode 4.16 "Sixteen Going on Seventeen"
  - episode 5.20 "Slade's Chophouse"
  - episode 6.03 "Legacy"
- Coming Unglued (1999) TV film
- Total Recall 2070 (1999) TV series
- Code Name: Eternity (1999) TV series
  - episode "Ethaniel's Story"
- Family Plan (1998)
- Eerie, Indiana: The Other Dimension (1998) TV series
- Mr. Music (1998) (TV)
- Prison of Secrets (1997) TV film
- Breaking Through (1996) TV film
- Race Against Time: The Search for Sarah (1996) TV film
- Closer and Closer (1996) TV film
- Rent-a-Kid (1995) (TV)
- ER (1994) TV series
  - episode 1.21 "House of Cards"
  - episode 1.23 "Love Among the Ruins"
- Due South (1994) TV film
- The X-Files (1993) TV Series
  - episode 1.11 "Eve"
- The Adventures of Brisco County, Jr. (1993) TV series
- The Commish (1991) TV Series
- Reasonable Doubts (1991) TV series
- Law & Order (1990) TV Series
  - episode 1.21 "Sonata for a Solo Organ"
  - episode 2.01 "Confession"
  - episode 2.17 "Sisters of Mercy"
  - episode 4.09 "Born Bad"
  - episode 5.06 "Competence"
  - episode 6.06 "Paranoia"
- Gabriel's Fire (1990) TV series
  - episode "Postcards from the Faultline"
- Midnight Caller (1988) TV series
  - episode "Ryder on the Storm"
- China Beach (1988) TV series
