= John Sacret Young =

American screenwriter, producer, and director (1946–2021)

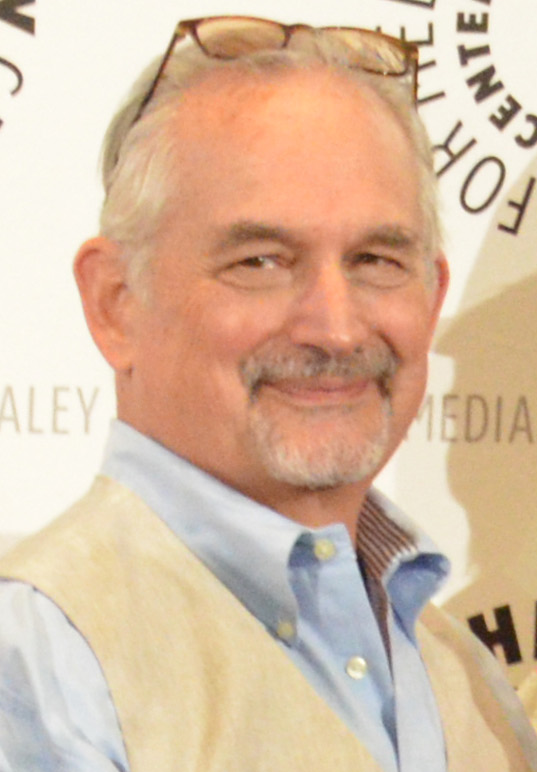
- Young in 2013
- Born: May 24, 1946; Montclair, New Jersey, U.S.
- Died: June 3, 2021 (aged 75); Los Angeles, California, U.S.
- Occupations: Screenwriter, producer, director

John Sacret Young (May 24, 1946 – June 3, 2021) was an American author, producer, director, and screenwriter primarily in television, perhaps best known for his work on the show China Beach. Young was nominated for seven Emmys and seven Writers Guild of America Awards, winning two WGA Awards.

== Life and career ==
Young co-created, along with William F. Broyles Jr., China Beach, the ABC drama series about the medics and nurses during the Vietnam War. For his work on the show, Young received five Emmy and four Writer's Guild Award nominations. The WGA honored him with the Award for an episode he also directed.The West Wing brought him two more Emmy and two more WGA nominations.

Young won his second WGA Award for the mini-series, A Rumor of War. He's also been honored with two Christopher Awards for the Academy Award-nominated feature film Testament starring Jane Alexander and the film Romero with Raul Julia. Young's the holder of a Golden Globe, a Peabody Award as well, and his original mini-series about the Gulf War, Thanks of a Grateful Nation, was honored with his fifth Humanitas Prize nomination and second win. He began his television work on the Emmy winning Best Drama series, Police Story, and has since created, written, or executive produced five additional series and multiple mini-series and movies of the week.

Young's book, Remains: Non-Viewable was a Los Angeles Times best seller. Elmore Leonard said of it: "Young writes so well his memoir works as a novel. He brings to life real people in dramatic situations, and with the added zest of suspense and a dash of Hollywood." Scott Turow wrote, "…a compelling portrait of many worlds—Yankee New England, Vietnam and Hollywood—and of high adventures, antic moments, and the cycles of love and grief. Every page is wrought with indelible grace and the restless energy of emotions that even the passage of time cannot quell." The LA Times Susan Salter Reynolds said, "Every family should be blessed by a historian as compassionate and wise as JSY." And, Steve Weinberg from The San Francisco Chronicle told his readers, "Like the rest of the memoir, the title is poignant, subtle and brilliant.... Want to study compelling prose? Read Young. Almost every sentence is perfectly crafted.... This book contains something for just about any thinking reader."

In reviewing Young's first novel The Weather Tomorrow, The New Yorker called him "a writer of effortless dexterity and a true, unaffected originality . . . The story he tells cuts right to the bone." Newsweek's Jean Strause heralded it, "...Exceptionally fine first novel." Art Seidenbaum of the Los Angeles Times said, "This is serious, touching, original fiction." And the Los Angeles Herald Examiner's Digby Diehl proclaimed, ""A brilliant debut by an L.A. novelist. Young is the first new voice in decades that might be compared to the young William Faulkner...What a rarity to discover a new Los Angeles writer whose control of language is precise and confident, whose sentences sparkle and glide and zoom."

In 2008 Young partnered as Executive Producer with Robert Redford, Young had written Generations, a pilot for TNT, which he also directed.

Young published a memoir in 2016, Pieces of Glass: An Artoire, reflecting on the visual arts and its relationship to his life. Artists discussed include Charles Burchfield, Winslow Homer, Richard Diebenkorn, John Marin, Andrew Stevovich, and many others.

In 2018, Young was honored with the prestigious Kieser Award for lifetime achievement in film and television from Humanitas Prize.

On June 3, 2021, Young died after battling brain cancer for ten months.

== Credits ==
- Generations (Writer, Executive Producer, Director, 2008)
- Quarterlife (Director, 2008)
- The West Wing (Writer, Producer: 2004–2006)
- Deceit (Writer, Executive Producer, Director, 2005)
- King of the World (Writer, Director, Executive Producer: 2000)
  Adapted from David Remnick's acclaimed New Yorker article, King of the World, examines the life of Cassius Clay, the man the world came to know and honor as Muhammad Ali.
- Sirens (Writer, Director, Executive Producer: 1999)
  A couple of cops assume a white woman making out with a black man is being raped, and they shoot to kill. The woman sets out to bring the cops to justice, but it's her word against theirs.
- Thanks of a Grateful Nation (Writer, Executive Producer: 1998)
  As thousands of Desert Storm vets develop medical problems, they discover the military has something to hide. Groups of servicemen and women, as well as members of Congress, join forces to uncover the truth.
- Keys (Writer, Director, Executive Producer: 1994)
  Police investigate the random murder/assault/child kidnapping of a seemingly average family. Marg Helgenberger, pre-CSI, seeks clues to the motive behind the crime and the whereabouts of the missing child. At the same time she is haunted by her own similar tragedy.
- Romero (Writer, executive Producer, 1990) based on the life of the martyred Salvadoran Archbishop Oscar Romero (played by Raul Julia), who in 2018 will be sainted by the Catholic Church.
- A Rumor of War (Writer: 1980)
  Adapted from Phillip Caputo’s best-selling memoirs, the award-winning film examines the tragic loss of innocence when a young Marine lieutenant is brought up on charges for giving an order, which led to the death of several Vietnamese civilians. Found innocent, but in many respects he believed himself and maybe the war itself that he was legally innocent but morally guilty.
- China Beach (Co-Creator, Writer, Director, Executive Producer: 1988–1991)
- Chandler(film) (Writer)

== Other credits ==
- Orleans (Co-creator, executive producer, writer, director) starring Larry Hagman.
- Level 9 (Co-created by Michael Connelly, executive producer, writer, director)
- VR 5 (Executive producer, writer, director)
- Fire on the Mountain, MOW from a book by Edward Abbey (Writer, executive producer) starring Buddy Ebsen and Ron Howard
- Champions: A Love Story, a GE Theater presentation (Writer, producer)
- Special Olympics (MOW, writer, also a book)
- Police Story (Writer)
- The Fitzpatricks (Creator, Writer, Executive Consultant)

== Publications ==
- John Sacret Young (1981). The Weather Tomorrow. Random House. ISBN 9780394521497.
- John Sacret Young (2005). Remains: Non-Viewable. New York: Farrar, Straus and Giroux. ISBN 9780374249038.
- John Sacret Young (2006). John Marin: The Edge of Abstraction. New York: Meredith Ward Fine Art.
- Carol Diehl, Valerie Ann Leeds, Anita Shreve, John Sacret Young (2007). Andrew Stevovich: Essential Elements. Lenox, MA: Hard Press Editions. ISBN 9781889097701.
- John Sacret Young, (2016). Pieces of Glass: An Artoire. Los Angeles: Tallfellow Press . ISBN 9781931290975
