= List of awards and nominations received by Judging Amy =

This is a list of the awards and nominations received by the American television series Judging Amy (1999–2005).

== By award ==
Award	Year	Category	Recipient	Result	Ref.
Art Directors Guild Awards	2001	Excellence in Production Design Award Television - Single-Camera Series	Michael Mayer and Scott Meehan for "Spoil the Child"	Nominated	
Emmy Awards	2000	Outstanding Lead Actress in a Drama Series	Amy Brenneman	Nominated	
Emmy Awards	2000	Outstanding Supporting Actress in a Drama Series	Tyne Daly	Nominated	
Emmy Awards	2000	Outstanding Art Direction for a Single-Camera Series	Kathy Curtis Cahill and Michael Mayer for "Spoil the Child"	Nominated	
Emmy Awards	2001	Outstanding Lead Actress in a Drama Series	Amy Brenneman	Nominated	
Emmy Awards	2001	Outstanding Supporting Actress in a Drama Series	Tyne Daly	Nominated	
Emmy Awards	2002	Outstanding Lead Actress in a Drama Series	Amy Brenneman	Nominated	
Emmy Awards	2002	Outstanding Supporting Actress in a Drama Series	Tyne Daly	Nominated	
Emmy Awards	2002	Outstanding Music and Lyrics	Peter Himmelman for "The Best Kind of Answer" in "Beating the Bounds"	Nominated	
Emmy Awards	2003	Outstanding Supporting Actress in a Drama Series	Tyne Daly	Won	
Emmy Awards	2004	Outstanding Supporting Actress in a Drama Series	Tyne Daly	Nominated	
Emmy Awards	2005	Outstanding Supporting Actress in a Drama Series	Tyne Daly	Nominated	
GLAAD Media Awards	2002	Outstanding Individual Episode (In a Series Without a Regular Gay Character)	"Between the Wanting and the Getting"	Nominated	
Golden Globe Awards	2000	Best Performance by an Actress In A Television Series - Drama	Amy Brenneman	Nominated	
Golden Globe Awards	2001	Best Performance by an Actress In A Television Series - Drama	Amy Brenneman	Nominated	
Golden Globe Awards	2002	Best Performance by an Actress In A Television Series - Drama	Amy Brenneman	Nominated	
NAACP Image Awards	2000	Outstanding Supporting Actor - Drama Series	Richard T. Jones	Nominated	
Producers Guild of America	2000	Norman Felton Producer of the Year for Episodic Television	Barbara Hall, Connie Tavel, Joseph Stern, and Amy Brenneman	Nominated	
Satellite Awards	2001	Best Actress - Television Series Drama	Tyne Daly	Nominated	
Satellite Awards	2002	Best Actress - Television Series Drama	Amy Brenneman	Nominated	
Screen Actors Guild Awards	2002	Outstanding Performance by a Female Actor in a Drama Series	Tyne Daly	Nominated	
Screen Actors Guild Awards	2003	Outstanding Performance by a Female Actor in a Drama Series	Amy Brenneman	Nominated	
Screen Actors Guild Awards	2004	Outstanding Performance by a Female Actor in a Drama Series	Tyne Daly	Nominated	
Television Critics Association Awards	2000	Outstanding New Program	Judging Amy	Nominated	
Young Artist Awards	1999	Best Performance in a TV Drama Series by an Actress Age 10 or Younger	Karle Warren	Nominated	
Young Artist Awards	1999	Best Family TV Drama Series	Judging Amy	Won	
Young Artist Awards	2000	Best Performance in a TV Series by an Actress Age 10 or Younger	Karle Warren	Won	
Young Artist Awards	2000	Best Family TV Drama Series	Judging Amy	Nominated	
Young Artist Awards	2001	Best Performance in a TV Drama Series - Supporting Young Actress	Karle Warren	Nominated	
Young Artist Awards	2002	Best Performance in a TV Series by an Actress Age 10 or Younger	Karle Warren	Nominated	
Young Artist Awards	2002	Best Performance in a TV Drama Series - Guest Starring Young Actress	Ashley Edner	Nominated	
Young Artist Awards	2002	Best Performance in a TV Series - Guest Starring Young Actor Age 10 or Younger	Tyler Patrick Jones	Nominated	
Young Artist Awards	2003	Best Performance in a TV Drama Series - Supporting Young Actress	Karle Warren	Nominated	
Young Artist Awards	2003	Best Performance in a TV Series - Guest Starring Young Actor	Miles Marsico	Nominated	
Young Artist Awards	2003	Best Performance in a TV Series - Recurring Young Actor	Crawford Wilson	Nominated	
Young Artist Awards	2004	Best Performance in a TV Series - Guest Starring Young Actor	Cameron Bowen	Nominated	
Young Artist Awards	2004	Best Performance in a TV Series - Guest Starring Young Actor	Andrew Michaelson	Nominated	
Young Artist Awards	2005	Best Performance in a TV Series - Guest Starring Young Actress	Cherrelle Noyd	Nominated	
