= Your Friends & Neighbors (TV series) =

American crime comedy-drama TV series

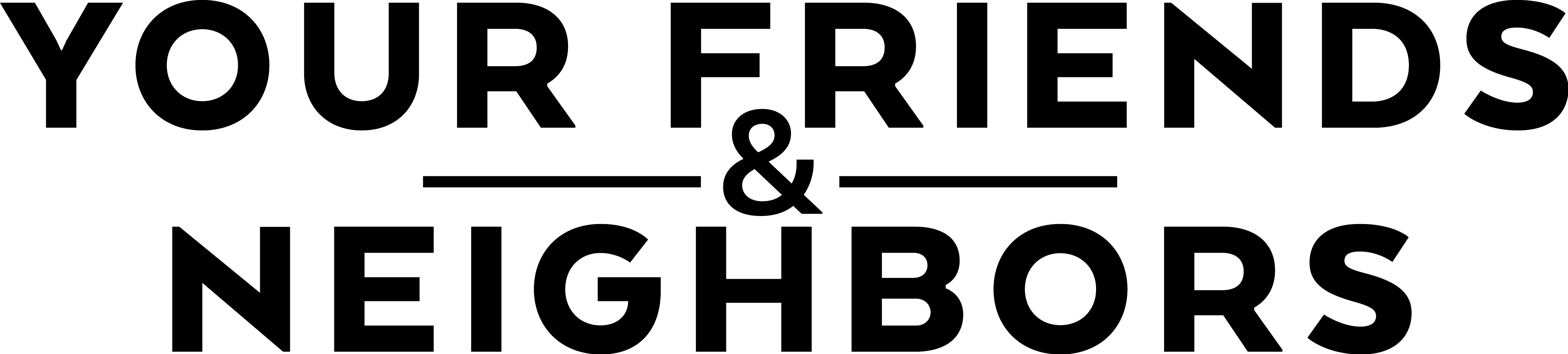
- Genre: Black comedy; Crime drama
- Created by: Jonathan Tropper
- Starring: Jon Hamm; Amanda Peet; Olivia Munn; Hoon Lee; Mark Tallman; Lena Hall; Aimee Carrero; Eunice Bae; Isabel Gravitt; Donovan Colan; James Marsden
- Music by: Dominic Lewis
- Opening theme: The Joneses by: Hamilton Leithauser; Dominic Lewis
- Country of origin: United States
- Original language: English
- No. of seasons: 2
- No. of episodes: 19

Production
- Executive producers: Jonathan Tropper; Jon Hamm; Connie Tavel; Craig Gillespie; Evan Endicott; Josh Stoddard; Jennifer Yale; Stephanie Laing; Lori Keith Douglas; Jamie Rosengard
- Cinematography: Zachary Galler; Justin Foster
- Editors: Tatiana S. Riegel; Aaron Yanes; Andy Keir; Sheri Bylander; Andrew Pang; Erica Freed
- Running time: 42–62 minutes
- Production companies: Tropper Ink; Fortunate Jack Productions; Apple Studios

Original release
- Network: Apple TV+
- Release: April 11 – May 30, 2025
- Network: Apple TV
- Release: April 3, 2026 – present

Your Friends & Neighbors is an American dark comedy crime drama television series created by Jonathan Tropper, starring Jon Hamm, Amanda Peet, Olivia Munn, Mark Tallman, Hoon Lee, Lena Hall, and Aimee Carrero. The series premiered on Apple TV+ on April 11, 2025.

The second season premiered on Apple TV on April 3, 2026. In February 2026, ahead of the second season premiere, the series was renewed for a third season. For its second season, it was nominated for the Primetime Emmy Award for Outstanding Drama Series.

== Premise ==
Coop is a New York hedge fund manager who is recently divorced and becomes unemployed. He uses criminal methods to maintain his lifestyle and keep his family living at the standard to which they have become accustomed.

== Cast and characters ==
=== Main ===
- Jon Hamm as Andrew "Coop" Cooper, a wealthy, disaffected financier who resorts to stealing from his neighbors after getting fired from his job
- Amanda Peet as Mel Cooper, Coop's ex-wife who is a therapist
- Olivia Munn as Samantha "Sam" Levitt, estranged wife of Paul Levitt and Mel's friend who is in a complicated on-and-off sexual relationship with Coop
- Hoon Lee as Barney Choi, Coop's best friend and business manager
- Mark Tallman as Nick Brandes, a former NBA player, Coop's former best friend, and Mel's new boyfriend
- Lena Hall as Allison "Ali" Cooper, Coop's free-spirited younger sister who struggles with mental illness and whom he looks after
- Aimee Carrero as Elena, Nick's housekeeper who becomes Coop's partner-in-crime
- Eunice Bae as Grace Choi, Barney's wife, who comes from money
- Isabel Gravitt as Tori Cooper, Coop's seventeen-year-old daughter
- Donovan Colan as Hunter Cooper, Coop's teenage son
- James Marsden as Owen Ashe (season 2), an eccentric billionaire shipping magnate who purchases a large home in Westmont from Sam and is a widower
- Michelle Monaghan (season 3)

=== Recurring ===
- Corbin Bernsen as Jack Bailey, Coop's former boss at Bailey Russell Capital Management
- Kitty Hawthorne as Olivia "Liv" Cross, an employee at Coop's firm with whom he had a one-night stand
- Jordan Gelber as Paul Levitt (season 1), Sam's philandering ex-husband with whom she is litigating a chaotic divorce. Found dead in the opening flashforward.
- Ramin Karimloo as Bruce Emerson, Ali's ex-fiancé from a decade ago who is now married with kids and whom Ali is still not over
- Robert Bagnell as Brad Sperling, the second neighbor that Coop robs
- Jennifer Mudge as Julie Sperling, Brad's wife and a prominent banker, making her the only female member of the men's social circle
- Anna Osceola as Maggie Haber, a friend of Mel and Suzanne's wife
- Rebecca Naomi Jones as Suzanne Haber, Maggie's wife who is also Mel's friend
- Robert Eli as Peter Miller, the first neighbor that Coop robs
- Stephanie Kurtzuba as Diane Miller, Peter's wife
- Dave Quay as Dom Resnick, Kat's husband who is unaware of her infidelity
- Heather Lind as Kat Resnick, a lawyer having an extramarital affair with her daughter's boyfriend, and the third homeowner that Coop robs
- Miriam Silverman as Gretchen Reagan, a divorcée who is friends with Mel
- Manu Narayan as Hari Sahni, Gretchen's significant other
- Matthew Rauch as Gordy Hughes, one of Coop's neighbors
- Michael O'Keefe as Ron Cooper, Coop and Ali's father
- Randy Danson as Lu Varga, a pawnshop proprietor and Coop's fence
- Elan Zafir as Rocco, a fence who works in the pawnshop and Lu's enforcer
- Daniel Dale as Jake Weston (season 1), Tori's 20-year-old boyfriend
- Lizbeth MacKay as Marley Cooper, Coop and Ali's mother
- Sandrine Holt as Detective Rebecca Lin (season 1), a Westmont PD police detective
- Ólafur Darri Ólafsson as Christian Tómasson (season 1), an underground art dealer and thug
- Arienne Mandi as Brienne Zalkin (season 2), Mel's neighbor whose dog becomes a nuisance
- Erin Robinson as Delilah Ashe (season 2), Ashe's teenage daughter who begins dating Hunter
- Bre Blair as Lisa Hughes (season 2), Gordy's wife
- Bojana Novakovic as Cricket Birch (season 2), an investor in Excelsior
- Oded Fehr as Luc DeMille (season 2), Ashe's mysterious attorney
- Joshua Jackson (season 3)
- Rick Cosnett (season 3)
- Sydney Lemmon (season 3)
- Mitchell Hoog (season 3)
- Gillian Zinser (season 3)

== Episodes ==
=== Series overview ===
Season	Episodes	Originally released		
Season	Episodes	First released	Last released	Network
1	9	April 11, 2025	May 30, 2025	Apple TV+
2	10	April 3, 2026	June 5, 2026	Apple TV

=== Season 1 (2025) ===
No. overall	No. in season	Title	Directed by	Written by	Original release date
1	1	"This Is What Happens"	Craig Gillespie	Jonathan Tropper	April 11, 2025
In a flashforward, Andrew "Coop" Cooper wakes up next to a dead body, and hastily covers his tracks. A month earlier, Coop, a wealthy hedge fund manager, is abruptly fired by his boss, Jack Bailey, over a complaint from Liv Cross, an employee he consensually slept with months prior. Blacklisted from finding another job, Coop learns Jack faked the complaint to absorb his accounts. Coop is divorced from his ex-wife Mel after catching her cheating on him with his best friend Nick, a former NBA championship winner, and has a strained relationship with his children, Tori and Hunter. Living in a rental home, Coop has an on-and-off sexual relationship with his neighbor Sam Levitt, herself going through a chaotic divorce, while supporting his wayward sister Ali. During a neighborhood party, Coop impulsively steals a roll of cash, and later returns to the house after the owners leave on vacation. Helping himself to more valuables, including a Patek Philippe watch, he considers robbing his other affluent Westmont Village neighbors to maintain his family's expensive lifestyle.
2	2	"Deuce"	Craig Gillespie	Jonathan Tropper	April 11, 2025
Without proof of ownership, Coop is forced to sell the watch for much less than it is worth to Lu, a pawnshop owner in the Bronx. Coop rubs elbows at the country club, where Mel and her friends console Sam when her ex-husband Paul flaunts his much younger girlfriend. Bringing Hunter to pick up his new drum kit, Coop takes Ali to live with their parents, but lets her move in with him instead. Spending the evening with Sam, he comforts her young son in the middle of the night. During Tori's tennis tournament, Coop robs the home of her competitor Chelsea's parents, Brad and Julie Sperling. Stealing a Richard Mille watch, he discovers the Sperlings have bought authentic SAT answers, and takes incriminating pictures. Lu refuses to buy the watch, sending Coop away after forcing another angry customer to leave at gunpoint, and runs Coop's plates.
3	3	"Theoretical Herpes"	Greg Yaitanes	Jonathan Tropper	April 18, 2025
Coop's business manager Barney Choi arranges a meeting with a lawyer to discuss suing Coop's former firm. At home, Coop finds Lu waiting; having run a background check on him, she agrees to continue fencing his stolen goods as long as he never exposes her involvement. Hunter's band plays at a house party, and he suffers a bad trip after taking psychedelic mushrooms; he calls Ali, who arrives to comfort him. Robbing his neighbors Dom and Kat Resnick, Coop witnesses Kat having sex with her daughter's boyfriend, and escapes with an expensive bottle of wine. He grudgingly joins Nick's party for the neighborhood husbands while their wives attend a self-defense course, where Mel and Sam open up to each other after sparring. The stolen bottle is broken when Coop picks a fight with Paul, and the party is cut short after a guest suffers an open fracture during a basketball game. Brad Sperling reports his missing watch to the police, but Detective Rebecca Lin is uninterested in investigating. Sneaking into Nick's house to steal his NBA championship ring, Coop is suddenly held at gunpoint.
4	4	"Literal Dragons"	Greg Yaitanes	Jamie Rosengard	April 25, 2025
Nick's housekeeper Elena has caught Coop red-handed, but proposes that they work together. With Elena as his getaway driver and Lu as their fence, Coop uses inside information from Elena's network of fellow housekeepers to carry out four more robberies. Liv warns Coop that the lawyer he met is in cahoots with Jack, and Sam is hurt to see Liv kiss Coop on the cheek. Elena enlists her cousin Hector, who works for the neighborhood's security company, to provide them with alarm codes. On his next heist, Coop disarms the alarm and attempts to steal a Birkin bag, but encounters another alarm and is forced to flee empty-handed from the owner's dog and the police. Nick throws an extravagant birthday bash for Mel, who has an existential crisis and leaves the party in dramatic fashion; Coop finds her and they share a sentimental moment, before he and Sam slip away together.
5	5	"This Tourist Has Balls"	Greg Yaitanes	Evan Endicott & Josh Stoddard	May 2, 2025
Sam ends her relationship with Coop, taking her children to visit her parents in Boston. When Hunter and his classmates are caught snorting his prescription Adderall at school, Mel agrees to donate $240,000 to save him from expulsion. Under financial pressure from home renovations and his overbearing in-laws, Barney nearly burns down the new construction while drunk. Ali finds a steady musical gig but runs into her ex-fiancé Bruce, whom she abandoned during a psychotic episode. Coop and Elena plan to steal a neighbor's Roy Lichtenstein painting, and a wary Lu sends them to Christian Tómasson, an underground art dealer. They replace the painting with a forgery, and Christian takes them to a club to celebrate with cocaine. Elena dances with Coop but is cornered and groped by Christian, who pulls a knife on Coop when he intervenes. Pepper-spraying Christian and escaping, Elena lashes out at Coop for losing the deal. A frustrated Coop attempts to rob Sam's house, where he slips on Paul's blood, regaining consciousness to find him dead. (Note: As depicted in the opening scene of "This Is What Happens") The next day, Coop and Barney each pretend nothing has happened.
6	6	"The Things You Lost Along the Way"	Stephanie Laing	Jennifer Yale	May 9, 2025
Detective Lin rules Paul's death an execution-style murder, but notices Coop's attempt to clean up and that Paul fired a gun, which is missing. Sam is questioned as the beneficiary of Paul's $20 million life insurance policy, as is Coop about his confrontation with Paul at Nick's party; (Note: As depicted in "Theoretical Herpes") they both provide alibis, but avoid mentioning their relationship, and Coop ignores Elena's and Lu's calls. The Cooper family visit Princeton University, where Coop and Mel spend the day drunkenly reminiscing while Tori and Hunter explore campus. Coop admits to Mel that he was fired, and they apologize to each other and have sex, after which Coop suggests the family start anew. Tori and Hunter are also inspired by their experiences, and the Coopers meet the Chois for dinner. In the street, Coop is jumped by Christian's thugs and Barney tries to intervene, but is hit by a car.
7	7	"The First Honest Thing"	Stephanie Laing	Danielle DiPaolo	May 16, 2025
After a surreal dream about the state of his life, Coop wakes up in the hospital, declining to cooperate with Detective Lin's investigation. Elena agrees to settle her brother Chivo's $150,000 debt to drug dealer Félix, but Hector refuses to continue aiding the robberies. Lin and her partner Hernandez discover footage of Coop on Sam's nanny cam, and bloody evidence in Coop's garbage tying him to the scene of Paul's death. Ali begins an affair with the married Bruce, while Barney angrily turns Coop away for continuing to lie to him. While the neighborhood attend Paul's funeral, the police search Coop's home, interrupting Ali's tryst with Bruce; she warns Coop, who preemptively blackmails Kat Resnick into serving as his legal representation. Lin arrests Coop for Paul's murder in front of the whole of Westmont, having found the murder weapon in his car. Coop spends the night in jail, which he reflects on as his first honest action in a long time.
8	8	"When Did We Become These People?"	Stephanie Laing	Bryan Parker	May 23, 2025
Coop pleads not guilty and his father Ron bails him out, but Mel refuses to let Coop see their children. Elena has stolen all of Coop's ill-gotten cash to pay off Chivo's debt; realizing his money is gone, Coop confronts Lu, who convinced Christian not to kill him, but warns Coop not to return to her shop. Mel and Nick encounter Sam at a coffee shop, and Sam declares Coop a murderer while Mel reveals she slept with Coop on the Princeton visit. The confrontation turns physical and video of Mel punching Sam is shared online; in the aftermath, Nick leaves Mel, who is put on leave from her job, and Bruce refuses to see Ali. Coop, Barney, and Nick drown their sorrows on a wild night out, with Coop and Barney admitting dissatisfaction with their materialistic lives; Barney passes out just as Coop attempts to admit his crimes. Hunter visits Coop to support him and Coop apologizes for their fractured relationship. Kat pleads with Coop to take a plea bargain, but he maintains his innocence.
9	9	"Everything Becomes Symbol and Irony"	Jonathan Tropper	Jonathan Tropper	May 30, 2025
Facing prison time, Coop signs over his half of the family's house to Mel and gifts Hunter his Rolex Cosmograph Daytona. Ali stops taking her medication for bipolar disorder and rants about Bruce onstage, later vandalizing his home. Mel convinces Coop to fight the charges, and he realizes Sam used a burner phone, which the police never found. Elena helps Coop search Sam's home for the phone, instead discovering Paul's suicide note, and Sam reveals the truth: a distraught Paul broke in and video-called her before shooting himself. As suicide would nullify his life insurance payout, Sam removed the note and staged Paul's murder, planting the gun to frame Coop. Desperate to keep the life she feels she has earned, Sam holds Coop at gunpoint, but is unable to shoot; she is arrested, and an exonerated Coop is welcomed back into Westmont high society. Nick accepts that Mel still loves Coop, who extorts the Sperlings to ensure Tori's place on the Princeton tennis team. Coop receives an offer to return to his old job, but instead of joining Jack and Liv on a business trip, he steals a painting from Jack's mansion, turning his back on his previous life.

=== Season 2 (2026) ===
No. overall	No. in season	Title	Directed by	Written by	Original release date
10	1	"We're Here Until We're Not"	Stephanie Laing	Jonathan Tropper	April 3, 2026
Coop maintains his luxurious lifestyle by continuing to steal, which he upscales by repairing his relationship with Lu and purchasing a New York office. He also finds comfort in coparenting and being single. Tori interviews at Princeton but declares it to be pointless given her family's donations. Sam is only sentenced for minor misdemeanors and given community service, but she is socially ostracized by the Westmont community. She becomes a realtor in an attempt to sell her house, but she instead sells a larger mansion to eccentric shipping billionaire Owen Ashe. Coop starts experiencing debilitating back spasms while trying to steal a Montblanc pen, and he and Elena are forced to call Barney for help when this occurs during a robbery. Barney thereby learns of Coop's criminal activity and realizes that the attack on them was a result of it. Barney also finds out that his wife Grace is pregnant, and his father-in-law asks him to inherit his business amidst Barney's financial pressures. Mel leaves Nick but struggles with other partners due to menopause. Ashe hosts an extravagant housewarming party for the community, which Sam briefly attends before quickly leaving. Barney asks Coop to let him take part in his heists in order to rebel against his father-in-law, which Coop reluctantly accepts.
11	2	"Lady Bits"	Stephanie Laing	Jamie Rosengard	April 10, 2026
Barney tells Coop that he needs to launder his money to avoid legal scrutiny, although Elena objects. Sam and her children continue to be excluded by the community, so she arranges dinner with Ashe. Mel struggles with further menopause symptoms, and writer's block while trying to write a book. Ali begins teaching music at Tori and Hunter's school, although Coop doubts its appropriateness amidst her needs. Mel and Coop throw a surprise party for Tori after she is accepted into Princeton, but Tori shockingly reveals that she declined the offer, stating her desire to make her own choices. Hunter, having troubles with his girlfriend Morgan, becomes close with Ashe's daughter Delilah, and the two of them join Ashe at a concert. Realizing Ashe's absence and temporary lack of security, Coop robs a valuable, first edition copy of Edith Wharton's The House of Mirth from Ashe's mansion and sells it to Lu. Ashe unexpectedly enters Coop's office and confronts him with a hidden camera video of the heist.
12	3	"We Were Never Supposed to Get This Old"	Stacie Passon	Julia Fontana	April 17, 2026
Ashe coerces Coop into recovering the Wharton book by threatening to inform the police, requiring Coop to find $200,000 to re-purchase it, but Ashe tricks Coop by buying the book himself. Ashe blackmails Coop into investing $400 million of his money into Bailey Russell's exclusive Excelsior fund, which Ashe can not do himself because he is sanctioned by OFAC and rumored to be an arms dealer. Ali finds difficulty in motivating her uninspired music students. Mel convinces a Princeton admissions tutor to annul Tori's rejection letter; this angers Tori, who moves in with Coop. Barney starts laundering Coop and Elena's money through Nick's gym franchise, and Elena celebrates becoming a US citizen. Ashe and Sam go for dinner together, and Hunter and Delilah become closer. A dog repeatedly poops in Mel's yard, causing her to hand a bag of poop to the owners Brie and Clay. Coop forms a plan to invest Ashe's money, avoids stealing in the meantime, and arouses Jack's attention after meeting with several finance contacts.
13	4	"The Bread of Affliction"	Stacie Passon	Nelson Greaves	April 24, 2026
Brie and Clay retaliate against Mel by disruptively constructing a fence. Hunter leaves Morgan and starts dating Delilah. At a Westmont Passover Seder, Ashe and Sam go together and Sam reconnects with her friends. Mel gets extremely drunk in reaction to Sam's resurgence, forcing Tori to send her home. Sam and Ashe begin a sexual relationship, causing Sam to decide against leaving Westmont. Grace's mother heavily interferes with Grace's pregnancy preparations, though Barney assertively kicks her out. Tori begins to skip activities, but Coop prevents her from intentionally missing school. Coop and Elena are suddenly forced to abort a heist when Ashe coerces Coop into visiting him to explain the investment's slow progress. Coop explains that he is courting Jack by ignoring him, so Jack sends Liv Cross to negotiate with Coop. Jack and Coop eventually meet, and Coop is accepted into Excelsior. Coop believes Ashe's blackmail to be over, but Ashe keeps the video.
14	5	"Halfway to Invisible"	Stephanie Laing	Bryan Parker	May 1, 2026
Coop and Jack travel to Greece to meet Excelsior investor Cricket Birch, who relays her suspicions about Coop's return. Cricket and Coop later admit their previous feelings for each other and sleep together, and Coop closes the Excelsior deal despite Jack embarrassing himself by overdosing on erection pills. Tori begins to doubt her decisions. Nick accepts a substantial investment from Ashe into his gym franchise against Barney's advice, and Ashe's lawyer DeMille inspects the franchise's financial records, freezing Coop and Elena's money. Meanwhile, Elena requires $50,000 to bail Chivo out of jail, but is unable to withdraw it from Nick's gym. Félix gives Elena the bail money, but Chivo runs away after disagreeing with Elena's occupation. At Nick's housewarming party, Elena is forced to leave when Félix ransacks her apartment looking for Chivo, Ashe informs Barney that the gym will be fully audited, Sam sincerely apologizes to Mel, and Coop learns of the death of his father, Ron.
15	6	"For Everything Else, There Was Bowling"	Stephanie Laing	Danielle DiPaolo	May 8, 2026
Coop, Ali and their mother, Marley, organize Ron's funeral, where Coop observes a mysterious woman mourning alone. Many of Ron's friends and Westmont attend his wake, but Coop discovers that Ron never opened an expensive gift from him. Ali, Mel and Tori smoke marijuana together to ease their nerves. Coop and Ali become frustrated at Marley's abrasiveness and insistence on giving away Ron's possessions, which boils over into an argument. Bruce comes to the wake after being invited by Marley, leading Ali to reveal their tryst, and Grace throws up from pregnancy complications. Coop leaves to visit a bowling alley frequented by Ron and himself as a child, where he meets the mourner, Elaine. Elaine reveals herself as Ron's secret lover and discloses Ron's worries about Coop even before his troubles. Marley breaks down into tears after the wake, and Ali comforts her.
16	7	"Out East"	Phil Abraham	Jessica Caldwell	May 15, 2026
Coop tells Elena that Ashe is blackmailing him and that their money is tied up in Nick's gyms, while Elena reveals Chivo fled after she borrowed bail money from Barney. Ashe hosts a party at his estate in the Hamptons and invites Coop, Hunter, Nick, Barney, Grace, and Sam. Barney worries about Ashe's audit of Nick's gyms. The FBI raid the home, which Ashe claims is routine; Ashe further alarms Sam by shooting a deer and later admitting that both the FBI and Interpol are investigating him for illegal arms dealing. He and DeMille pressure Coop into investing more money in exchange for a 5% cut. Meanwhile, Coop reconnects with Cricket and nearly sleeps with Sam after Ashe drugs the guests with MDMA. Elsewhere, Tori is arrested for drunk driving, while Mel is also arrested after vandalizing Brie and Clay's portable toilet alongside Ali, forcing Coop to return to Westmont to bail them out. Returning home, Coop finds that someone is watching his house.
17	8	"I Feel Lost Without Me"	Phil Abraham	Cara Pomanti & Drew Buchmeyer	May 22, 2026
Coop hires Kat Resnick to represent Mel and Tori, and informs Liv of Ashe's criminality, to which she refuses to help. Mel is offered a reprieve from legal action if she apologizes to Brie and Clay, but they ask her to take anger management classes and later file a restraining order. Ashe prepares a surprise dinner to apologize to Sam, but she rejects him and asks for space. Barney pleads with Coop to cut ties with Ashe, who is linked to multiple disappearances, so Coop tries to fire Barney, which Barney rejects. Félix taunts Elena over her debt and gives her a week to settle it. Coop and Elena attempt to rob vintage baseball cards, but are hindered when the house owners return early and have an extensive argument. Coop escapes with a $300,000 card without being caught and arrives at Tori's trial on time, where she is punished lightly. Mel accidentally runs over and kills Brie and Clay's dog, whose body Sam helps bury, and Mel and Sam make up. Growing frustrated at her lack of independence, Ali quits her job and moves into her own house with inheritance money from Ron. After saying his goodbyes, Coop is kidnapped by a group of masked men.
18	9	"Propaganda from the Cowardly"	Stephanie Laing	Jamie Rosengard	May 29, 2026
Coop's kidnappers threaten him not to interfere with the Excelsior investment before releasing him. At Grace's baby shower, Ashe publicly serenades Sam and invites her for dinner, which she rebuffs, then Coop confronts Ashe, although he denies any involvement in the kidnapping. Elena distances herself from Coop due to his lack of communication and delayed payment from Lu. Coop informs Jack of the investment's illegality and Jack offers to return the funds when he finds alternative investors, although Liv is fired for suggesting a cover-up. Brie and Clay cancel the construction, leading Mel to sleep with one of their foremen, Miguel. Coop, Barney and Nick meet a drug-induced Ashe for dinner, where Ashe reveals Coop and Barney's money laundering to Nick. Coop responds by revealing the return of the investment, to which Ashe threatens Coop's family and holds the group at gunpoint, with an accidental shot prompting a scuffle that leads Ashe to catch on fire and become enraged, firing chaotically while chasing the others. As the group try to escape, Ashe shoots a flower pot and slips on his head, supposedly killing him.
19	10	"The Night of the Hunter"	Stephanie Laing	Jonathan Tropper	June 5, 2026
Coop, Barney and Nick cover up Ashe's death and dispose of the evidence in his mansion. Sam arrives unexpectedly, and she agrees to the cover up due to her fear of being suspected. Ashe suddenly wakes up while Coop, Barney and Nick drive his car to a burial site, causing a struggle that ends when Nick crashes into a lake. Ashe drowns while the others survive, and they stage the crash to appear as if Ashe was driving. Two weeks later, the community presumes Ashe to be dead and Nick is overwhelmed with guilt. Delilah moves out of Westmont, which Sam also considers. Coop finds Ali with Sam's help, and they finally discuss their father's passing. During a Father's Day celebration at the country club, Nick fires Barney for his money laundering, sparking a public altercation also involving Coop, leading Grace to separate from Barney. Meanwhile, Elena settles her debts by allowing Félix to rob Nick's mansion. DeMille meets with Coop to hand over Ashe's blackmail footage, with DeMille implying that Birch orchestrated Coop's kidnapping, while Mel witnesses the discussion. Coop returns Jack's stolen painting, and Mel rewrites her book to discuss Coop's ordeals. Some time later, Ashe's car is discovered in the lake.

== Production ==
It was announced in December 2023 that Jon Hamm was set to star in and executively produce the series, which was created by Jonathan Tropper. The series is produced by Apple Studios. In February 2024, Olivia Munn joined the cast. In March 2024, Amanda Peet, Mark Tallman, Hoon Lee and Lena Hall were added to the cast, with Craig Gillespie, Greg Yaitanes and Stephanie Laing set to direct episodes of the series. In April 2024, Aimee Carrero, Isabel Gravitt, Donovan Colan, and Eunice Bae were added to the main cast, with Sandrine Holt and Corbin Bernsen cast in recurring roles. Production began in April 2024, with Tropper announcing this on his Instagram. Ahead of series premiere, in November 2024, the series was renewed for a second season.

In April 2025, James Marsden joined the cast as a series regular for the second season. In May 2025, Arienne Mandi, Erin Robinson, and Bre Blair were cast in unnamed recurring roles for the second season. In February 2026, ahead of the second season premiere, Apple TV renewed the series for a third season. In April 2026, Michelle Monaghan joined the cast as a series regular for the third season. In June 2026, Joshua Jackson, Rick Cosnett, Sydney Lemmon, Mitchell Hoog, and Gillian Zinser were cast in recurring roles for the third season. Production on the third season ended on September 29, 2026.

== Release ==
Your Friends & Neighbors was released on Apple TV+ on April 11, 2025, with its first two episodes and the rest debuting on a weekly basis. The second season premiered on Apple TV on April 3, 2026.

== Reception ==
Critical response of Your Friends & Neighbors
Season	Rotten Tomatoes	Metacritic
1	79% (61 reviews)	63 (27 reviews)
2	89% (29 reviews)	69 (11 reviews)

=== Critical response ===
On the review aggregator website Rotten Tomatoes, the first season holds an approval rating of 79%, based on 61 critic reviews, with an average rating of 7/10. The website's critics consensus reads: "An acidly witty riff on Breaking Bad, Your Friends & Neighbors' class commentary occasionally stumbles but has an endlessly watchable avatar in star Jon Hamm." On Metacritic, which uses a weighted average, it received a score of 63 out of 100, based on 27 critics, indicating "generally favorable" reviews.

The second season holds an 89% approval rating on review aggregator Rotten Tomatoes, based on 29 critic reviews, with an average rating of 7.3/10. The website's critics consensus reads: "Continuing to peek through the satirical façade of socialite life, Your Friends & Neighbors' second season digs itself into a deeper and richer character hole, where Hamm, Munn, and Marsden make like bandits and steal the show." On Metacritic, the second season received a score of 69 out of 100, based on 11 critics, signifying "generally favorable" reviews.

=== Awards and nominations ===
Season	Award	Category	Nominee(s)	Result	Ref.
Season 1	Artios Awards	Television Pilot and First Season: Drama	Cindy Tolan, Suzanne Ryan, and Nicholas Petrovich	Nominated	
Season 1	Golden Trailer Awards	Best Drama (Trailer/Teaser) – TV/Streaming Series	"Petty Crime" (Apple TV / Tiny Hero)	Nominated	
Season 1	Golden Trailer Awards	Best Sound Editing in a Trailer/Teaser – TV/Streaming Series	"Petty Crime" (Apple TV / Tiny Hero)	Nominated	
Season 1	Hollywood Music in Media Awards	Best Original Score – TV Show/Limited Series	Dominic Lewis	Nominated	
Season 1	Hollywood Music in Media Awards	Best Main Title Theme – TV Show/Limited Series	Dominic Lewis and Hamilton Leithauser	Won	
Season 1	Primetime Creative Arts Emmy Awards	Outstanding Original Main Title Theme Music	Dominic Lewis and Hamilton Leithauser	Nominated	
Season 1	Saturn Awards	Best Thriller Television Series	Your Friends & Neighbors	Nominated	
Season 1	Set Decorators Society of America Awards	Best Achievement in Décor/Design of a One Hour Contemporary Series	Philippa Culpepper and Anu Schwartz	Nominated	
Season 2	Celebración of Cinema & Television	Supporting Actress – Series	Aimee Carrero	Honored	
Season 2	Golden Trailer Awards	Best Drama TV Spot – TV/Streaming Series	"Caught" (Apple TV / Tiny Hero)	Nominated	
Season 2	Golden Trailer Awards	Best Music (Trailer/Teaser) – TV/Streaming Series	"Dangerous People" (Apple TV / Tiny Hero)	Nominated	
Season 2	Imagen Awards	Best Supporting Actress – Comedy	Aimee Carrero	Nominated	
Season 2	MacGuffin Awards	One Hour Contemporary Television Series	Jackie Wertz and Ryan Gargiulo	Nominated	
Season 2	Primetime Emmy Awards	Outstanding Drama Series	Jonathan Tropper, Craig Gillespie, Stephanie Laing, Lori Keith Douglas, Jamie Rosengard, Jon Hamm, Connie Tavel, and Chris Arruda	Nominated	

== See also ==
- Conspicuous consumption
- Diderot effect
- Keeping up with the Joneses
- Kleptomania
