= Jessica Landaw =

American film director

- Occupations: Film director, film editor, television director, television editor, television producer
- Years active: 1994–present

Jessica Landaw is an American director, editor and producer of film and television.

She has directed a number of documentaries and short films in career as well as working as an editor on the films Mighty Morphin Power Rangers: The Movie (1995), The Great White Hype (1996), The War at Home (1996) and The House of Yes (1997).

As a television director her credits are Judging Amy, Cold Case, Bones, One Tree Hill and the Web series The Booth at the End starring Xander Berkeley.
