= The Booth at the End =

- Genre: Psychological thriller
- Created by: Christopher Kubasik
- Written by: Christopher Kubasik
- Directed by: Jessica Landaw (season 1); Adam Arkin (season 2)
- Starring: Xander Berkeley
- Theme music composer: Tree Adams (season 1); John Swihart (season 2)
- Original language: English
- No. of seasons: 2
- No. of episodes: 10

Production
- Producers: Stephen A. Cohen; Noel Bright; Lou Fusaro; John H. Radulovic; Adam Arkin
- Editors: David Dawes; Jessica Landaw; Richard Choi
- Running time: 21–24 minutes
- Production company: Vuguru

Original release
- Network: City; Hulu
- Release: August 27, 2010 – September 3, 2012

The Booth at the End is a psychological thriller series created by Christopher Kubasik and starring Xander Berkeley, and was produced by Vuguru. The series premiered on August 27, 2010 on the Canadian network City. Two seasons were produced, each consisting of five 23-minute episodes. The first season was directed by Jessica Landaw, and the second by Adam Arkin.

The series follows the fates of an apparently random group of strangers who each enter into a Faustian pact with a mysterious figure, the Man (Berkeley), whom they believe possesses the power to grant any wish, in return for which they must carry out a task he assigns them – hence the series tagline, "How far would you go to get what you want?" The series is notable for its mise-en-scene, in which the dramatic action is entirely conveyed through a series of conversations between the Man and his clients, which all take place in the eponymous "booth at the end" of an archetypal American diner.

== Synopsis ==
The Man (Berkeley) is an anonymous, morally ambiguous agent who habitually occupies the booth at the end in a classic 1950s-style diner in an unnamed city. In each episode, a character enters the diner, and after giving a passphrase, begs the Man to grant a wish, typically something of a life-changing or impossible nature. The Man consults a large ledger and assigns a task. The task is non-negotiable; once completed, the wish will be fullfilled. Clients are permitted to walk away from their deal at any time, or achieve their wish through other means.

The Man requests each person regularly return to the diner, to ask questions about their progress, state of mind, and feelings, occasionally making notes in the book. The clients' tasks range from the mundane (calling a person) to the monstrous (killing a child). The characters report back on their progress to the Man, desperately attempting to bargain with or deceive him in order to receive their wish without completing their tasks.

Clients are tormented by the mysterious nature of the Man, wondering if he is a demon or somehow magic, though he appears to have little to no control over the tasks assigned or the outcomes, and they agonize over what the decisions they are making to get what they want mean about them as people.

== Cast and characters ==
- The Man (Xander Berkeley): The Man sits in the far corner booth of a diner. Characters who approach him with a specific desire are given a task. If the task is completed, the desire is fulfilled. Often, progress towards the completion of the task also results in progress towards the realization of the desire. A further requirement is to be updated on the thoughts and feelings of the characters as they progress in completing the task. The Man often emphasizes that he does not set the tasks, and it does not matter to him whether or not the task is completed, or the method of completion; the choice is always up to the other person. Therefore, any accusations of moral outrage or evil made by the characters should be reflected on themselves.

=== Season 1 ===
In season 1, the Man and his book are found at Cadillac Jack's, a diner, where he is waited on by Doris, and is seen, with moral ambiguity, to offer each of the visiting characters a deal toward her or his desire in return for the completion of a task.

- James (Matt Nolan) is in his early 30s. He has a wife and two children: a young boy and girl. His son has leukemia and is currently hospitalized. To save his son, he has to select and murder a little girl, and once chosen, he cannot pick another child. The Man tasks another client, Willem, to protect the child (Elizabeth). Eventually the two men become aware of each other and their conflicting tasks; this ultimately results in Willem kidnapping Elizabeth to keep her safe from James' attempts to kill her. When James begins tracking Willem in order to find the girl, he attacks James in his home, and James kills him in self-defense. James then follows the clues left behind to find Elizabeth, but decides not to kill her though he was prepared to. Despite not fulfilling the task, James' son is cured of leukemia. James demands answers from the Man, who simply replies that he never guaranteed a refusal to carry out the task would result in his son's death.
- Jenny (Kate Maberly) wants to be prettier, and is told to steal $101,043 from a bank or series of banks. She prepares to steal from a bank by buying a gun and scoping out possible banks. During her preparations, she meets Richard, who lives in a car and makes his living by stealing from banks. Jenny brings Richard to meet the Man, and Richard tells the Man that he wishes his father, a cop, would leave him alone. For his task, Richard is told to help Jenny rob banks. She and Richard then attempt to rob a bank, but a shootout occurs and Jenny is shot in the arm. Richard then comes to the Man without Jenny to ask that she accept herself the way she is. Richard is given a new task to call his father, the detective, and tell him he loves him. Rather than continue the task of robbing banks to make Jenny prettier, they decide to leave town.
- Willem (Matt Boren) has a friend who attributed his success to the Man at the booth at the end. He approaches the Man hoping to get a woman from the centerfold in a magazine. The Man tasks him with protecting a little girl, Elizabeth, for a period of ten weeks. In order to protect the girl, Willem takes up jobs as a janitor at Elizabeth's school and as a gardener on Elizabeth's street. After he saves her from a speeding car (driven by James), Willem is lauded as a hero by her family, but he realizes that there is a man after Elizabeth's life. He decides to kidnap Elizabeth to keep her safe under his watch, at least until his time as her protector is up. Feeling inferior, Willem wants to be a hero so he doesn't have to get his happiness from making deals. Willem soon realizes that James is following him to gain knowledge on the whereabouts of Elizabeth. Unnerved, Willem decides to kill James to protect Elizabeth. He breaks into James' house and attempts to stab James with a knife; however, James manages to take the knife away and kills Willem in self-defense.
- Mrs. Tyler (Norma Michaels), who, in order to cure her husband's Alzheimer's, is expected to kill an unmentioned number of people, which she has chosen to accomplish by building a bomb and placing it at Andy's, a popular coffee shop. She builds the bomb using information she finds on the internet. She plans to place the bomb at the coffee shop at a time when many people would frequent it. The next time she sees the Man, she claims to have set it off; however, she had been lying. The Man knew she was lying because if she had set it off, she would already have what she wanted. Mrs. Tyler wavers, unwilling to set the bomb off, yet strongly desiring to have her husband whole again. She tells the Man that she decided against detonating the bomb, and found out that her husband had been spontaneously cured: he never had Alzheimer's, but a misdiagnosis of Normal Pressure Hydrocephalus which was giving him the same symptoms.
- Melody (Jennifer Del Rosario) is a 17-year-old girl, charming and positive. She loves her father and wants him to be happy again – like he was before his business started having trouble – and the Man tells her to get a shut-in out of his home. Melody volunteers with a shut-in and slowly builds his trust. He remains unwilling to leave his house and she discovers evidence that he is actually a serial killer. When the police ignore her, she plans to drug the shut-in and drag him out of the house. While she successfully drugs the man, he is not completely unconscious and attacks her while she is dragging him. She is able to drag him out of the house, but then succumbs to her wounds and dies. However, her wish is fulfilled and her father's financial problems are resolved.
- Allen (Jack Conley), a detective in his 40s, is a hard-edged man with a violent streak he tries valiantly to control. He is expected to kill a man in order to locate the money stolen from a bank. Allen initially lies to the Man and does not receive the money, until he later kills the person in his lie. When complete he is angered that he found the money, but not the bank robber (who turns out to be his son Richard, Jenny's accomplice and also a client of the Man), leading him to ask for a second deal, for his son to come home. For this, he has to hide a fellow cop's criminal behavior. He tracks down a corrupt cop, a homicide detective who has been stealing from murder victims. However, when his son calls him and tells him he loves him, Allen realizes that he himself is a corrupt cop. He decides to turn himself in for his earlier murder.
- Sister Carmel (Sarah Clarke) is a nun in her mid-30s who is losing her faith. She says God once spoke to her but she no longer hears Him. The Man tells her to become pregnant. Sister Carmel sneaks out of the convent to start dating. Eventually she meets Simon and begins a relationship with him. In the end she happily tells the Man that she is certain she is pregnant and God is talking to her again. Simon reveals her real name is Margaret.
- Doris (Jenni Blong) is a waitress in the diner the Man operates from, observing the comings and goings of his "clients." Curious, she strikes up a conversation with the Man, trying to find out who he is and what he's doing with all these people. Unlike the other characters, she isn't looking for anything and has no need to make a deal with the Man. This throws the Man off guard, and causes him to reveal things about himself that no one else would discover. This leads to him making a request, rather than soliciting one.
- Simon (Timothy Omundson), an artist in his early 40s, has devoted his life to painting. Despite technical craftsmanship, he has yet to create paintings as beautiful as he envisions. He will do anything to finally accomplish this, and is tasked with becoming a father. He finally succeeds by painting a portrait of Sister Carmel, with whom he begins a relationship.
- Richard (Jake Richardson) is Allen's son and part of Jenny's story. He is tattooed, hotheaded and a thief. He ends up making a deal with the Man to be left alone by his father, for which he has to help Jenny rob banks. Subsequently, he wants to stop Jenny wanting what she wants, and is tasked with telling his father he loves him.
- Gerald (Anthony Wong) is Melody's father. He explains that Melody succeeded in dragging the shut-in out of his apartment, but died as a result of the injuries she received during this task. Though he is unaware of the connection to the Man in the booth, since she succeeded in her task, Gerald's money problems disappeared. He comes to the Man wanting to bring his daughter back to life, and the Man tells him, "That can happen." The episode ends before Gerald is given his task.

=== Season 2 ===
In season 2, the Man has changed his diner and left behind Doris as waitress (and, seemingly, has changed the appearance of his book and pen). He continues to offer patrons deals toward their desires, in return for the completion of tasks. The season reveals more regarding both the Man and his nature, regarding the mysterious book that is the source of the tasks, and regarding the character of Doris from season 1.

- Cheryl (Michelle Allsopp), a mother in her late 30s, has a daughter suffering from an undisclosed debilitating disorder, who asks for her daughter to be healed of her condition. The initial task given to her is to find a woman without friends or family and to torture her. Cheryl locates a potential victim but is unable to carry through with the task. Cheryl then wishes to accept her daughter as she is and is given the new task of abandoning her family for three weeks without word or warning. The Man even offers his own personal help. After the three weeks Cheryl returns to the diner fully accepting her daughter for who she is.
- Doris (Jenni Blong), featured in season 1, returns. Initially she informs the Man that Melody had survived her attack in season 1, referring to the deal struck in the close of the final episode. Doris appears to be more than a simple waitress as she knows about the book. She and the man allude to a common origin (and possible enmity). He notes that he should have noticed when they first met. She begins asking him about why he makes the deals and the book he uses. In a reversing of roles, the Man asks for her to use the book to make him a deal; he wants to understand people. He is tasked with picking a person and helping them. Subsequently, he volunteers to assist Cheryl with her task, bringing her food and supplies while she hides out. In the final segment of season 2, after debriefing him on his task and newfound understanding, she announces that she wants to make a deal herself: for him to love her.
- Conner (Keegan Boos) is brought by his friend Bobby to meet the Man. Conner's mother has thrown out his father; Conner asks for his return and for him to stop drinking. After some initial reluctance on the Man's behalf, the Man gives them the task of finding and returning a missing person home. The boys learn of Cheryl's recent disappearance and seek to find her. Conner discovers Cheryl on his own; the two talk, and though neither reveals their task or connection to the man in the booth, she agrees that when she is ready, she will let Conner be the one to "find" her. Eventually Conner is the one to bring Cheryl home.
- Jack (Dayton Callie), an elderly man, returns repeatedly to the diner to tell the man of his exploits in robbing a number of persons. This thievery is in return to "protect his grandchildren" by stopping the construction of an unnamed religious site. However his desire turns more vicious as he wants the complete eradication of all that faith's believers. To do so Jack must commit a public attack slaughtering twenty-two in broad daylight with others bearing witness. Jack begins to plan and set up for these attacks, becoming increasingly enthusiastic about it as he nears readiness. He has a chance encounter with Henry and decides that he must execute his task right away. On the day of the planned slaughter, Henry tries to stop him, inadvertently killing him.
- Melody (Jennifer Del Rosario) returns for season 2. She confronts the Man, demanding answers about what happened to her, believing that she was dead and that another woman died in her place in order to bring her back to life. She wishes for their places to be reversed. Her task is making something worth living for. She decides to start a garden giving her a chance encounter with Dillon. The pair exchange each other's pains. When sharing this with the Man, she is given one more opportunity to revoke the deal but wishes to go through with it. She dies in her sleep.
- Dillon (Noel Fisher), a young man in his early 20s, fears the entirety of death. Upon their first meeting, Dillon tells the Man that he wishes to be invulnerable and live forever without changing so that he may enjoy his life. The Man is hesitant to help, demanding that Dillon be honest with him. Dillon's finally reveals that his father died while serving in the military. It was set to be a closed casket, but Dillon removed the bolts revealing what remained of his father. Dillon is tasked with marking three people, but must determine what this means on his own in order to do so. His first attempt of breaking another man's nose in a fight is not acknowledged by the book. After a chance encounter with Melody, Dillon "marks" her by sharing his feelings, fears and experiences with her. After her death he returns to the diner and breaks off the deal, saying that she had marked him as well and deciding he doesn't want to bear such marks forever without the people who made them.
- Theresa (Abby Miller) is a plain woman, only asking to be loved. She is tasked with approaching a number of men and making sexual advances towards them. She is also struggling with being her nephew's guardian, as he struggles with anger issues which cause problems at school and at home. As she nears the end of the task his anger issues subside and he shows a newfound love towards her. She begins to fear this is the love bargained for in her deal, and considers asking for a new one specific to finding romantic love but worries that abandoning her current task will return her nephew's anger problem. While she is struggling with the decision, a stranger follows her home one night, comes to her door and tells her that she is "worth more". She leaves the diner one last time happy with herself.
- Henry (Danny Nucci), a man in his late 30s, is unhappy with his life and wishes that instead of marrying his current wife Heather, he would have instead been married to his past sweetheart Katie. Henry wants to just have been happily married for twenty years, not to have experienced those years or to relive those years, but just to wake up having been married to Katie for two decades. His task is to become a servant to a higher power. This is particularly vexing to Henry, who insists he is an atheist and finds the concept of God foolish. After some reluctance and confusion Henry crosses paths with Jack as Jack is scoping out a place for his task. On the day Jack plans to finish his task, Henry runs forward and tackles Jack. During the struggle Jack is shot and killed. Returning to the diner, Henry decides to revoke the deal and just live his life.
- Maria (Romina Peniche) is concerned about her mother, who is unhappy after the death of her husband and the institutionalization of her other daughter due to drug addiction. Maria wishes her mother to be broken free of her depression and to be filled with love for the rest of her days. In return, she is given the task of making five people cry. However she finds it quite difficult to make anyone cry, including random children at the zoo, an ex lover, and a baby. She finally is successful in helping a grieving boy finally cry after the loss of his mother. Maria tells the stories of her failed attempts to complete the task to her mother, making her laugh and bringing some joy back to her life. At this Maria has accomplished what she wanted and says farewell to the Man.
- Bobby (Brendan Chadd Thomas) is a young boy who desires to help his friend Conner. Despite the Man's initial reluctance, Bobby returns to the diner with Conner. After explaining the potential costs, the Man proceeds to offer the boys a task: find and bring home a missing person.

== Production ==
The series was created by Christopher Kubasik and was produced by the internet production company Vuguru. It was originally released in the form of 62 two-minute webisodes, which were released on Shorts in the City on citytv.com in August 2010, before being adapted to more traditional television-sized episodes. The series ran two seasons, and consisted of five twenty-three minute episodes in each season. The first season was directed by Jessica Landaw. The second season was directed by Adam Arkin. Both were also co-producers for their respective seasons.

The first season was filmed on location at Cadillac Jack's Cafe in Sun Valley, Los Angeles. The second season was filmed in the Barclay Hotel.

== Episodes ==
=== Season 1 (2010) ===
The episodes of the first season were directed by Jessica Landaw.

No. overall	No. in season	Title	Original release date
1	1	"Start. See What Happens"	August 27, 2010
2	2	"What One Begins, One Must Finish"	August 27, 2010
3	3	"How You Do It is Up to You"	August 27, 2010
4	4	"I Have My Reasons"	August 27, 2010
5	5	"Our Deal Here Is Done"	August 27, 2010

=== Season 2 (2012) ===
The episodes of the second season were directed by Adam Arkin.

No. overall	No. in season	Title	Original release date
6	1	"There Are Consequences"	August 6, 2012
7	2	"A New Reality"	August 13, 2012
8	3	"It's Not Supposed to Be Easy"	August 20, 2012
9	4	"The Rules of the Game"	August 27, 2012
10	5	"Nothing More, Nothing Less"	September 3, 2012

== Broadcast and release ==
The first season of The Booth at the End premiered on August 27, 2010, on the Canadian network City, and was released in the United States by Hulu on July 11, 2011. The show was also shown on FX in the United Kingdom in April 2011.

The second season of the series premiered on Hulu and on the citytv.com video portal on August 6, 2012, with new episodes premiering every Monday, and with the fifth and final episode of season 2 being released on September 3, 2012. It also aired on FX in the United Kingdom from November to December 2012.

== Home media ==
In the UK and Ireland, both seasons were available to be streamed via Amazon Video. However Season 1 is no longer available due to expired rights, and Season 2 is now available only as a single "movie" version on the same platform. In the United Kingdom, it was released on the online video on demand channel of walla!. Season 1 was previously available on Netflix in the United Kingdom and Ireland.

== Reception ==
Lucy Mangan of The Guardian praised Xander Berkeley's performance as "so brilliant it should be used as an acting masterclass". The series was nominated for three categories at the 3rd Streamy Awards with Berkeley winning Best Male Performance in Drama.

== Film adaptation ==
An Italian cinematographic adaptation titled The Place was directed by Paolo Genovese in 2017.
