= First Wives Club (TV series) =

2019 American television series

- Genre: Comedy
- Based on: The First Wives Club by Robert Harling
- Written by: Tracy Oliver
- Starring: Michelle Buteau; Jill Scott; Ryan Michelle Bathe; Mark Tallman; RonReaco Lee; Malik Yoba; Michelle Mitchenor
- Country of origin: United States
- Original language: English
- No. of seasons: 3
- No. of episodes: 29

Production
- Executive producers: Tracy Oliver; Karen Rosenfelt; Scott Rudin
- Camera setup: Single-camera
- Running time: 26-31 min.
- Production companies: Tracy Yvonne Productions; Jax Media; Paramount Television Studios

Original release
- Network: BET+
- Release: September 19, 2019 – December 15, 2022

First Wives Club is an American comedy television series based on the 1996 film of the same name written by Robert Harling; it premiered on September 19, 2019 on BET+. The series was renewed for a second season on November 26, 2019, premiering on July 15, 2021. On September 8, 2021, the series was renewed for a third season. Unlike the original film, the series features an entirely African-American cast.

== Premise ==
The First Wives Club is set in New York City and follows three women (Ari, Bree, and Hazel) who band together after their marriages fall apart, and who find strength in their sisterhood and revenge.

== Cast and characters ==
=== Main ===
- Michelle Buteau as Dr. Bree Washington
- Jill Scott as Hazel Rachelle
- Ryan Michelle Bathe as Ariel "Ari" Montgomery (née Carmichael) (seasons 1–2)
- Mark Tallman as David Montgomery
- RonReaco Lee as Gary Washington
- Malik Yoba as Derrick Ellsworth (season 1)
- Michelle Mitchenor as Jayla Wright (seasons 2–3)

=== Recurring ===
- Tara Pacheco as Versace Ellsworth
- Bill Barrett as Jacob Rosen
- Jordan Carlos as Curtis
- Deborah Cox as Regina
- Bailey Tippen as Megan
- Gary Dourdan as Dr. Malcolm Reynard
- Mikhail Keize as Nigel
- Jaxon Rose Moore as Imani Washington
- Auston Jon Moore as Ollie Washington
- Chase Dillon as Ollie Washington
- Naledi Murray as Imani Washington
- Tobias Truvillion as Khalil
- Raymond Greene-Joyner as Big
- Essence Atkins as Maxine

== Episodes ==
Season	Episodes	Originally released	
Season	Episodes	First released	Last released
1	9	September 19, 2019	
2	10	July 15, 2021	
3	10	November 17, 2022	December 15, 2022

=== Season 1 (2019) ===
No. overall	No. in season	Title	Directed by	Written by	Original release date	BET air date	U.S. linear viewers (millions)
1	1	"Pilot"	Jamie Babbit	Tracy Oliver	September 19, 2019	January 27, 2021	N/A
2	2	"Plan B"	Anu Valia	Tracy Oliver	September 19, 2019	February 3, 2021	N/A
3	3	"Diamonds Are Forever"	Ryan Case	Alison Brown	September 19, 2019	February 10, 2021	N/A
4	4	"Storytelling"	Ryan Case	Leila Cohan-Miccio	September 19, 2019	February 17, 2021	N/A
5	5	"What Happens Upstate"	Anu Valia	Julian Breece	September 19, 2019	February 24, 2021	0.47
6	6	"The Glow Up"	Stella Meghie	Rachelle R. Williams	September 19, 2019	March 3, 2021	0.58
7	7	"Something Blue"	Tracy Oliver	Thembi Ford	September 19, 2019	March 10, 2021	0.51
8	8	"One Night Only"	Stella Meghie	Yvette Foy	September 19, 2019	March 17, 2021	0.60
9	9	"Vengeance"	Samantha Bailey	Tracy Oliver	September 19, 2019	March 24, 2021	0.57

=== Season 2 (2021) ===
No. overall	No. in season	Title	Directed by	Written by	Original release date	BET air date	U.S. linear viewers (millions)
10	1	"Independent Women"	Stacey Muhammad	Tracy Oliver & Britt Matt	July 15, 2021	January 5, 2022	0.58
11	2	"On Bended Knee"	Stacey Muhammad	Nicole Drespel	July 15, 2021	January 12, 2022	0.59
12	3	"What About Your Friends"	Leslie Kolins Small	Yvette Foy	July 15, 2021	January 19, 2022	0.63
13	4	"Freak Like Me"	Leslie Kolins Small	Elaine Aronson	July 15, 2021	January 26, 2022	0.63
14	5	"Not Gon' Cry"	Leslie Kolins Small	Britt Matt & Aundrea Posey	July 15, 2021	February 2, 2022	0.62
15	6	"Ex-Factor"	Daniella Eisman	Nicole Drespel & Morgan Collins	July 15, 2021	February 9, 2022	0.45
16	7	"Caught Out There"	Daniella Eisman	Elaine Aronson & Yvette Foy	July 15, 2021	February 16, 2022	0.46
17	8	"This Is How We Do It"	Shea William Vanderpoort	Jordan Carlos & Nicole Drespel	July 15, 2021	February 23, 2022	0.39
18	9	"Spend My Life With You"	Shea William Vanderpoort	Britt Matt	July 15, 2021	March 2, 2022	0.53
19	10	"End of the Road"	Daniella Eisman	Tracy Oliver	July 15, 2021	March 9, 2022	0.51

=== Season 3 (2022) ===
No. overall	No. in season	Title	Directed by	Written by	Original release date	BET air date	U.S. linear viewers (millions)
20	1	"You Can't Hurry Love"	Shea William Vanderpoort	Elaine Aronson	November 17, 2022	May 31, 2023	0.42
21	2	"Stop in the Name of Love"	Shea William Vanderpoort	Britt Matt	November 17, 2022	June 7, 2023	0.46
22	3	"What Becomes of the Brokenhearted?"	Daniella Eisman	Julian Kiani	November 24, 2022	June 14, 2023	0.57
23	4	"Ain't it Peculiar"	Princess Monique Filmz	Nicole Drespel & Julian Kiani	November 24, 2022	June 21, 2023	0.45
24	5	"The Way You Do the Things You Do"	Daniella Eisman	Nicole Drespel	December 1, 2022	June 28, 2023	0.43
25	6	"Ask the Lonely"	RonReaco Lee	Aundrea Posey	December 1, 2022	July 5, 2023	0.42
26	7	"What Does It Take"	Daniella Eisman	Josephine Green Zhang	December 8, 2022	July 12, 2023	0.27
27	8	"Standing in the Shadows of Love"	Shea William Vanderpoort	Kayla Renee Brooks & Banna Desta	December 8, 2022	July 19, 2023	0.51
28	9	"I Heard It Through the Grapevine"	Princess Monique Filmz	Elaine Aronson	December 15, 2022	July 26, 2023	0.48
29	10	"Dancing in the Streets"	Daniella Eisman	Britt Matt	December 15, 2022	August 2, 2023	0.42

== Production ==
=== Development ===
On March 13, 2016, it was announced that TV Land had given a pilot order to the production. The episode was set to be written by Rebecca Adelman and executive produced by Jenny Bicks. On June 3, 2016, it was also reported that Karen Rosenfelt would executive produce the series and that Paramount Television would serve as the main production company for the project. Both Rosenfelt and Bicks had been producers on the original 1996 film. TV Land also revealed the premise of the pilot which was described as "Set in present-day San Francisco, the story revolves around three women – friends and classmates in the '90s – who reconnect after their close friend from college dies in a freak accident. When they discover that they are all at a romantic crossroads, they band together to tackle divorce, relationships and life's other annoying challenges." On November 11, 2016, it was announced that TV Land had passed on the pilot but that it was possible for it to be redeveloped.

On March 30, 2017, Kevin Kay, president of Paramount Network, TV Land, and CMT, talked about the series in an interview with Deadline Hollywood. In the interview he mentioned that the intention was for the production to move from TV Land and to be redeveloped as a new pilot at the Paramount Network. On October 2, 2017, it was announced that Tracy Oliver would write the redeveloped pilot. It was also expected that Karen Rosenfelt would executive produce this version of the project as well. On April 5, 2018, Paramount Network officially gave the production a pilot order. It was also reported that Scott Rudin, a producer of the original film, would act as executive producer for the series. On April 19, 2018, it was announced that Paramount Network had given the production a series order for a first season consisting of ten episodes. On November 27, 2018, it was reported that Paramount Network was reevaluating their plans for a night of dramedy programming and that as such the series would instead premiere on Paramount Network's sister network BET. On December 20, 2018, it was announced that the series would feature numerous easter eggs and callbacks to the original film, including a newly recorded version of the song "You Don't Own Me".

=== Casting ===
On June 3, 2016, it was announced that Alyson Hannigan and Megan Hilty had been cast as two of the three female leads in the series. Hannigan was cast as Maggie, similar to Diane Keaton's character in the film, who was described as an English professor in San Francisco who once had aspirations of being a poet. Stuck in a failing marriage, it is after her old college friend dies that she decides to make changes in her life. Hilty was cast as Kim, similar to Goldie Hawn's character in the film, who was described as previously successful who had "aged out" of Hollywood. She continues to keep herself in shape, acts in commercials, and hopes for her big break to come along. Divorced and living with her 8-year-old son, she is happy to have her old friends in her life again. Later that month, it was reported that Vanessa Lachey had been cast to round out the trio of main characters. She was cast as Sasha, a successful chef with a girlfriend she plans to marry who begins to question settling down once her friends reenter her life.

In August 2018, it was announced that Michelle Buteau, Jill Scott, and Ryan Michelle Bathe had been cast in the lead roles of the second iteration of the series. On September 24, 2018, it was reported that Mark Tallman, RonReaco Lee, and Malik Yoba had been cast in the series' lead male roles.

=== Filming ===
Principal photography for the series commenced on September 28, 2018, in New York City. Filming had concluded by the week of December 10, 2018.

Buteau had her role reduced and actually missed several episodes in season 3 because she was developing and writing her Netflix show Survival of the Thickest.

== Release ==
On December 20, 2018, a "first look" still image from the series was released featuring Michelle Buteau, Jill Scott, Ryan Michelle Bathe in character as Bree, Hazel, and Ari, respectively.
