= Mark Tallman =

American actor

- Tallman in 2026
- Education: Bucknell University
- Occupation: Actor
- Years active: 2007-present
- Television: Your Friends & Neighbors

Mark Tallman is an American television and film actor. His television roles include First Wives Club (2019-2022) and Your Friends & Neighbors (2025-present).

== Early life ==
Tallman played high school sports at Carthage Senior High School in New York State, especially American football, basketball, and baseball. He went on to attend Bucknell University in Pennsylvania, where he played as a linebacker in Division I College football for the Bucknell Bison football team.

== Career ==
After coaching football at St. Lawrence University, in Canton, New York, Tallman moved into acting and had a recurring role on the ABC soap opera All My Children as Kyle. Tallman appeared as Detrell Thorne, father of the lead character, Robbie in Rise, as well as State of Affairs, for NBC. Tallman also had television roles on AMC series Dietland and CBS series The Good Fight. His film roles included Rough Night, and he was a voice actor in the video games Grand Theft Auto V and Red Dead Redemption II.

Tallman appeared as David Montgomery in three series of First Wives Club for Netflix. In March 2024, he was cast as Nick Brandes, a former NBA All-Star and successful entrepreneur in Your Friends & Neighbors written by Jonathan Tropper for Apple TV+ alongside Amanda Peet and Jon Hamm. Broadcast in 2025, he returned for the second season in 2026, with the series renewed for a third season that year.

== Partial filmography ==
Year	Title	Role	Notes
2007-2008	All My Children	Kyle	8 episodes
2011	Damages	Robert Franks	6 episodes
2012	Single Ladies	Reggie Westfield	9 episodes
2014	State of Affairs	Aaron Payton	6 episodes
2017	Rough Night	Malcolm	Film
2018	The Good Fight	Rashid	1 episode
2018	Rise	Detrell Thorne	5 episodes
2018	Dietland	Jake	3 episodes
2019	The Last O.G.	Greg	3 episodes
2019-2022	First Wives Club	David Montgomery	29 episodes
2025	Daredevil: Born Again	Clay	1 episode
2025–present	Your Friends & Neighbors	Nick Brandes	Main cast
