= Sandra Purpuro =

American actress

Sandra Purpuro is an American film and television actress. Her most prominent roles are those of Katherine McClain on Oz, and Liz Labella on DiResta. She has also appeared in Lethal Weapon, Days of Our Lives, The Young and the Restless, and Switched at Birth. Other work include guest appearances on series like Caroline in the City, NYPD Blue, Six Feet Under, The Shield, CSI: Crime Scene Investigation, Will & Grace, Two and a Half Men, Desperate Housewives, Malcolm in the Middle, The Suite Life on Deck, House M.D., Modern Family and 24.

== Acting career ==
Purpuro played Gloria Flores in the 2003 crime series The Handler. In 2006, she starred in the short film Man vs. Monday, directed by Ian Ziering.

=== Theatre ===
In 1991, Purpuro acted in the musical comedy Prom Queens Unchained. Purpuro was praised for her role in the 1994 Broadway production of Grease directed and choreographed by Jeff Calhoun. Ben Brantley of The New York Times commented that "the liveliest bonafide dancing comes from Sandra Purpuro, as the exotic outsider at the senior prom". She also appeared in the 2009 production Red, Hot and Blue, and Douglas Green's 2010 production of Cold Lang Syne. In 2011, Purpuro played the role of Livvy in The Sonneteer, by Nick Salamone. She appeared in Kristen Lazarian's Love Like Blue.
