= DiResta =

- Genre: Sitcom
- Created by: Matt Goldman
- Starring: John DiResta; Leila Kenzle; Robert Costanzo; Karle Warren; Joe Guzaldo; Sandra Purpuro
- Composer: Marc Bonilla
- Country of origin: United States
- Original language: English
- No. of seasons: 1
- No. of episodes: 15

Production
- Camera setup: Multi-camera
- Running time: 30 minutes
- Production companies: Maple Seed; Paramount Television

Original release
- Network: UPN
- Release: October 5, 1998 – March 1, 1999

DiResta is an American sitcom which premiered on UPN on October 5, 1998, on its Monday schedule. It was cancelled after its March 1, 1999 airing. The show was named for stand-up comedian John DiResta; this was his first television venture.

The series was described by Entertainment Weekly as "A transit cop, his funny job, and his funny family." On the week of November 2–8, 1998, it was the lowest rated non-Pax TV show aired.

== Cast ==
- John Diresta as Off. John Diresta
- Leila Kenzle as Kate Diresta
- Joe Guzaldo as Sgt. Kazmerek
- Sandra Purpuro as Off. Liz Labella
- David Batiste as Cal
- Erik Palladino as Tully
- Karle Warren as Anna Diresta
- Ruairi Kenna and Sean Kenna as Dakota Diresta
- Robert Costanzo as Vic Diresta

== Episodes ==
No.	Title	Directed by	Written by	Original release date	Prod. code	Viewers (millions)
1	"Pilot"	John Tracy	Matt Goldman	October 5, 1998	001	2.10
2	"John Kisses Some Ass"	Unknown	Unknown	October 12, 1998	003	1.95
3	"Public Enema No. 1"	Unknown	Unknown	October 19, 1998	004	1.78
4	"Walk on the Feminine Side"	Unknown	Unknown	October 26, 1998	002	1.62
5	"Heavy Metal"	Unknown	Unknown	November 2, 1998	007	1.05
6	"Romeo and Juliet Were Lucky"	Unknown	Unknown	November 9, 1998	008	1.54
7	"Cookin' With Gas"	Unknown	Unknown	November 16, 1998	005	1.90
8	"Thanksgiving"	Unknown	Unknown	November 23, 1998	006	1.94
9	"The Kid"	Unknown	Unknown	December 21, 1998	009	2.26
10	"Your Daddy Don't Dance"	Unknown	Unknown	January 25, 1999	015	2.85
11	"One Wedding and a Funeral"	Unknown	Unknown	February 1, 1999	011	2.28
12	"The Torch"	Unknown	Unknown	February 8, 1999	012	1.86
13	"Viagra Falls"	Unknown	Unknown	February 15, 1999	013	1.9
14	"Half a Million Clams"	Unknown	Unknown	February 22, 1999	014	1.53
15	"Slam Dunkin Donuts"	Unknown	Unknown	March 1, 1999	010	1.76
