= Joseph Stern =

American actor (born 1940)

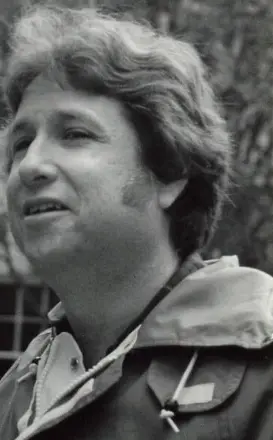
- Stern in The Big Easy, 1982
- Born: September 3, 1940 (age 85); Los Angeles, California, U.S.
- Occupations: Television producer, actor, theatrical producer
- Years active: 1967–present

Joseph Stern (born September 3, 1940) is an American television, film and theater producer and actor.

== Life and career ==
Stern was born in Los Angeles and graduated from Fairfax High School and UCLA. Aiming to become a professional Shakespearean actor, Stern auditioned at Joe Papp's Public Theatre and was hired there in his first paid acting job.

As an actor, Stern played the role of Larry Hale on the CBS soap opera Love Is a Many-Splendored Thing from 1969 to 1971. During the 1970s, he made some guest appearances on TV series' including The Rockford Files, M*A*S*H, Kojak, Family, The Feather & Father Gang and Hart to Hart.

Stern is best known for producing such films and television series as Law & Order, Cagney & Lacey, Judging Amy, Dad and No Man's Land. Overall, he has produced over 250 episodes of television, as well as numerous long form specials and films. He has had several overall deals and has worked for four studios and six networks. His development for them amounted to over twenty pilot scripts, eleven of which were shot and six that have made it to series.

Stern is also the founder of The Matrix Theatre Company.

== Filmography ==
Year	Title	Role	Notes
1972	The Irish Whiskey Rebellion	Heydt	
1974	The Lords of Flatbush	Eddie The Drug Store Clerk	
1980	Hero at Large	Assistant Director	
