= Xander Berkeley =

American actor (born 1955)

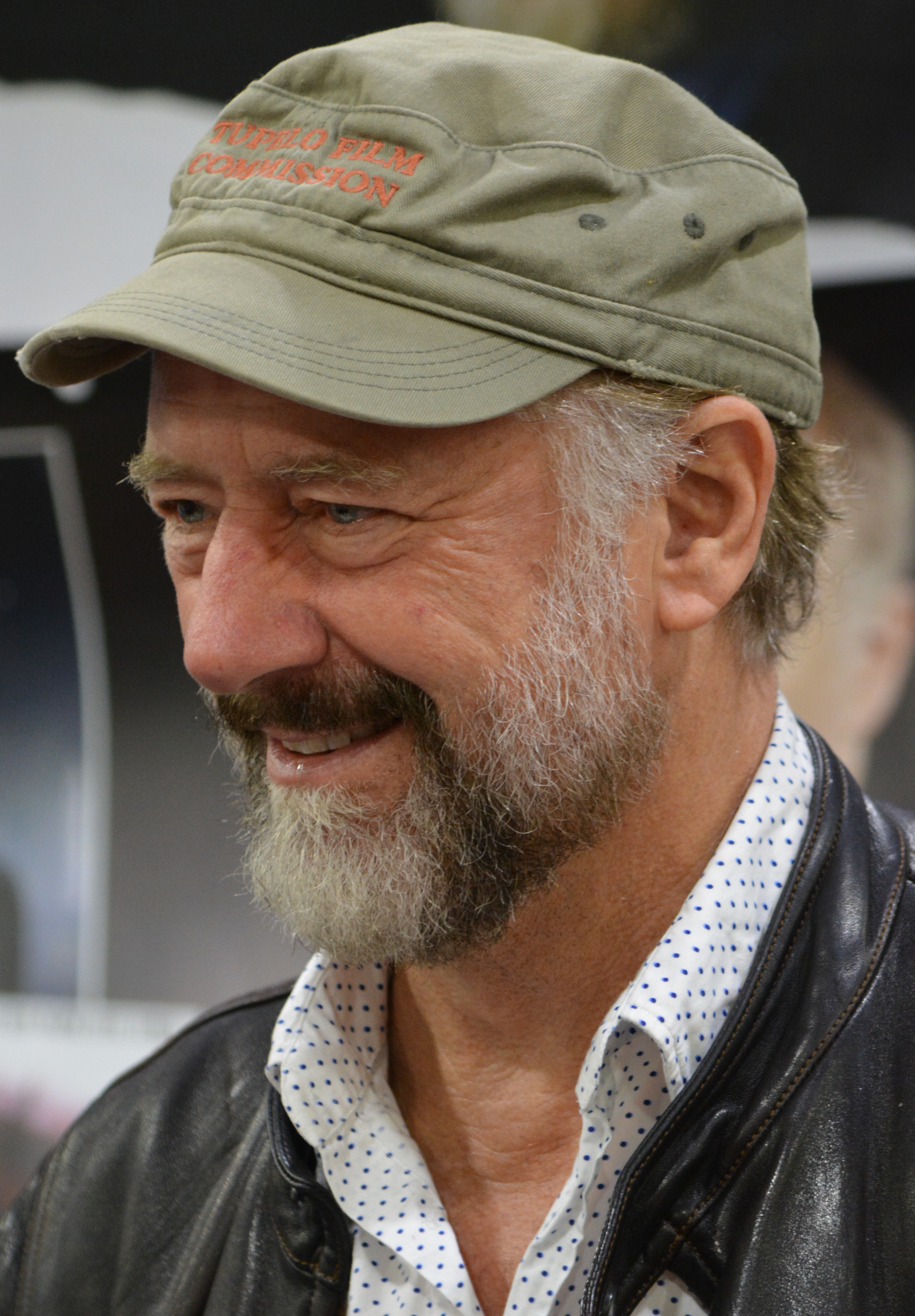
- Berkeley in October 2016
- Born: Alexander Harper Berkeley; December 16, 1955 (age 70); New York City, U.S.
- Occupation: Actor
- Years active: 1981–present
- Spouse: Sarah Clarke (m. 2002)
- Children: 2

Alexander Harper Berkeley (born December 16, 1955) is an American actor. Since beginning his career in the early 1980s, he has appeared in over 200 film and television projects. His films include Terminator 2: Judgment Day (1991), Candyman (1992), Apollo 13, Barb Wire (1996), Air Force One (1997), Gattaca (1997), and Shanghai Noon (2000). He also appeared in the crime dramas L.A. Takedown (1989) and its remake Heat (1995), although he played a different character in each film. On television, he headlined the Citytv psychological thriller The Booth at the End (2010–2012) and was a series regular on the Fox action drama 24 (2001–2003) and The CW action thriller Nikita (2010–2012). As a guest star, Berkeley portrayed Sheriff Thomas McAllister on the CBS drama The Mentalist (2008–2013). He played a major supporting role as Gregory on the AMC post-apocalyptic horror The Walking Dead (2016–2018).

== Early life and education ==
Berkeley was born in Brooklyn and raised in New Jersey. He is of English and Scottish descent. He attended Hampshire College, and worked in theaters at the Five Colleges, including Smith, Mount Holyoke, Amherst and the University of Massachusetts. He worked in regional and repertory theaters in addition to Off-Broadway in New York City. A casting agent spotted Berkeley in a play written by Reynolds Price called Early Dark and encouraged him to move to Hollywood.

== Career ==
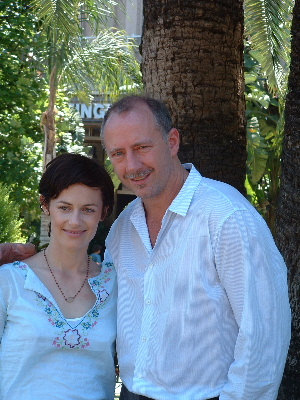
Berkeley and Sarah Clarke on the set of 24 in 2002

Berkeley began playing roles in 1981, with early appearances in M*A*S*H, Cagney & Lacey, Remington Steele, Miami Vice, Moonlighting, and The A-Team. His later television roles included The X-Files, CSI: Crime Scene Investigation, ER and Law & Order.

On screen, his first film role was as the adult version of Christopher Crawford, Christina Crawford's brother, in Mommie Dearest. He has appeared in North Country, Terminator 2: Judgment Day, Phoenix, Kick-Ass, A Few Good Men, The Rookie, Candyman, Apollo 13, Leaving Las Vegas, Gattaca, The Rock, Air Force One, Sid and Nancy, Amistad, Shanghai Noon, Barb Wire and Timecode. He appeared in the television film L.A. Takedown in 1989 and its 1995 acclaimed theatrical remake Heat, directed by Michael Mann. Several of his earlier roles were in films directed by Alex Cox.

In 2001, Berkeley became a recurring guest star (and later a series regular) on 24 in the role of George Mason, the head of the counter-terrorist unit. He portrayed the mysterious John Smith on the CBS drama Jericho.

In 2010, he received one of his best-known roles, Percy Rose on The CW action-thriller series Nikita. He portrayed the character as a series regular and de facto main antagonist of its first two seasons. He also played Sheriff Thomas McAllister on The Mentalist.

Berkeley portrayed Gregory on AMC's The Walking Dead as a guest star in season six and a series regular in seasons seven and eight, with one additional appearance in the season nine premiere.

In 2018, he portrayed Peter Lockwood, the father of Sam Lockwood on the fourth season of Supergirl.

In 2023, he made a guest appearance as Captain Pellaeon in the third season of The Mandalorian, a role he reprised a year later for the animated Tales of the Empire.

=== Voice acting ===
Berkeley provides voice-work and voice-over for several animated series, such as Aaahh!!! Real Monsters, Gargoyles and Teen Titans. He also voiced Quentin Beck / Mysterio on The Spectacular Spider-Man, Captain Atom in Superman/Batman: Public Enemies and Dr. Kirk Langstrom in Son of Batman.

=== Awards ===
In 2013, Berkeley won the Streamy Award in the category of Best Male Performance: Drama for his starring role in the acclaimed web series The Booth at the End.

== Personal life ==
Berkeley is also an accomplished make-up artist, painter, and sculptor. Berkeley met actress Sarah Clarke on the set of 24 in 2001 and married her the following year.

== Filmography ==
=== Film ===
Year	Title	Role	Notes
1981	Mommie Dearest	Christopher Crawford (Adult)	
1982	Tag: The Assassination Game	Connally	
1985	Volunteers	Kent Sutcliffe	
1986	Sid and Nancy	"Bowery Snax"	
1987	Straight to Hell	Preacher McMahon	
1987	Walker	Byron Cole	
1988	Tapeheads	Ricky Fell	
1988	Deadly Dreams	Jack Thorne	
1989	The Fabulous Baker Boys	Lloyd	
1990	Internal Affairs	Rudy Mohr	
1990	The Last of the Finest	Eddie "Fast Eddie"	
1990	The Guardian	Detective	
1990	Short Time	Carl Stark	
1990	The Grifters	Lieutenant Pierson	
1990	The Rookie	Ken Blackwell	
1991	Terminator 2: Judgment Day	Todd Voight	
1991	Billy Bathgate	Harvey Preston	
1991	For the Boys	Roberts	
1992	The Gun in Betty Lou's Handbag	Mr. Marchat	
1992	Candyman	Trevor Lyle	
1992	A Few Good Men	Captain Whitaker	
1994	Caroline at Midnight	Joey Szabo	
1995	Safe	Greg White	
1995	Apollo 13	Henry Hurt	
1995	Leaving Las Vegas	Cynical Cabbie	
1995	Heat	Ralph	
1996	Poison Ivy II: Lily	Donald Falk	
1996	A Family Thing	Sunburned Man	
1996	Barb Wire	Chief Alexander Willis	
1996	The Rock	Dr. Lonner	Uncredited
1996	Driven	J.D. Johnson	
1996	Bulletproof	FBI Agent Darryl Gentry	
1997	The Killing Jar	Danny "Figaretto" Evans	
1997	Air Force One	Secret Service Agent Gibbs	
1997	One Night Stand	Charlie's Friend	
1997	Gattaca	Dr. Lamar	
1997	Amistad	Hammond	
1997	The Truth About Juliet	George	
1998	Phoenix	Lieutenant Clyde Webber	
1999	Universal Soldier: The Return	Dr. Dylan Cotner	
1999	The Cherry Orchard	Epihodov	
2000	Timecode	Evan Wantz	
2000	Shanghai Noon	Marshal Van Cleef	
2001	Storytelling	Mr. DeMarco	Segment: "Non-Fiction"
2001	China: The Panda Adventure	Dakar Johnston	
2001	The Man from Elysian Fields	Virgil Koster	
2003	Quicksand	Joey Patterson	
2004	Human Error	Hanrahan	
2004	In Enemy Hands	Admiral Kentz	
2005	Drop Dead Sexy	Harkness	
2005	Deepwater	Gus	
2005	Standing Still	Jonathan	
2005	North Country	Arlen Pavich	
2006	The Garage	"Doc" Ruppert	
2006	Seraphim Falls	Railcrew Foreman	
2007	Fracture	Judge Moran	
2008	Taken	Stuart St. John	
2008	Cook County	"Sonny"	
2009	Women in Trouble	Mr. Frost	
2009	Year One	The King	
2009	Repo Chick	Aldrich De La Chasse	
2009	Superman/Batman: Public Enemies	Captain Atom	Voice, direct-to-video
2010	Kick-Ass	Detective Vic Gigante	
2010	Bedrooms	Harry	
2010	Faster	Sergeant Mallory	
2010	The Death of Socrates	Socrates	
2010	Luster	Detective Carter	
2011	Girl Walks into a Bar	Moe	
2011	Seeking Justice	Lieutenant Durgan	
2012	That Guy... Who Was in That Thing	Himself	Documentary film
2013	Louder Than Words	Dr. Lansen	
2013	Live at the Foxes Den	Kenneth Whitman	
2014	Transcendence	Dr. Thomas Casey	
2014	Small Time	Chick	
2014	24: Solitary	The Handler	Voice; short film
2014	Son of Batman	Dr. Kirk Langstrom	Voice, direct-to-video
2014	This Last Lonely Place	Frank Devore	
2014	Pony	Uncle Jeff	Short film
2015	Solace	Mr. Ellis	
2016	Allegiant	Phillip	
2016	Moments of Clarity	Artemis	
2017	Shot	Dr. Roberts	
2018	Proud Mary	Uncle	
2018	The Maestro	Mario Castelnuovo-Tedesco	
2018	City of Lies	Edwards	
2019	The Wall of Mexico	Michael Rand	
2019	Dark Harbor	Priest James	
2020	The Dark and the Wicked	Father Thorne	
2022	Butcher's Crossing	Charlie Hoge	
2022	Lockdown	Joel	Also known as The Audition
2024	Reagan	George Shultz	
2025	No Address	Harris	
2026	Recluse	TBA	Post-production
TBA	A Great Depression	TBA	Post-production

=== Television ===
Year	Title	Role	Notes
1981	M*A*S*H	Marine	Episode: "Give 'Em Hell, Hawkeye"
1981	Open All Night	Medfold	Episode: "Centerfold"
1982	The Incredible Hulk	Tom	Episode: "A Minor Problem"
1982	McClain's Law	Peter	Episode: "To Save the Queen"
1982	Hart to Hart	Christopher Hawks	Episode: "Harts on Their Toes"
1982	Tales of the Gold Monkey	Eric Fromby	Episode: "Escape from Death Island"
1983	Remington Steele	Dan Kowalski	Episode: "Steele Crazy After All These Years"
1983	The Renegades	Gillette	Episode: "The Big Time"
1983	Cagney & Lacey	Maurice	Episode: "The Gang's All Here"
1983, 1984	The A-Team	Baker, Sergeant Wilson	2 episodes
1984	Riptide	Taxi Driver	Episode: "The Hardcase"
1984	Falcon Crest	"Buzz" Whitehead	Episode: "Strangers"
1985	V	Isaac Henley	Episode: "Breakout"
1986	The Twilight Zone	Dave	Episode: "Take My Life... Please!/Devil's Alphabet/The Library"
1986	Moonlighting	Scalper	Episode: "Symphony in Knocked Flat"
1987, 1989	Miami Vice	Bailey, Tommy Lowell	2 episodes
1988	J.J. Starbuck	Bobby Tinch	Episode: "Rag Doll"
1988	CBS Summer Playhouse	Dr. Noah Fredericks	Episode: "Dr. Paradise"
1989	L.A. Takedown	Waingro	TV movie
1990	Father Dowling Mysteries	Carl Maxwell	Episode: "The Exotic Dancer Mystery"
1990	Wiseguy	Ray Spiotta	Episode: "Romp"
1990	Grand	Jeffrey	Episode: "The Chickens Come Home to Roost"
1991	Dillinger	Copeland	TV movie
1991	Not of This World	Bruce MacNamara	TV movie
1991	Super Force	Dr. Landru	3 episodes
1991	Murder in High Places	Wayne	TV movie
1992	A Private Matter	Peter Zenner	TV movie
1993	It's Nothing Personal	James Blakemore	TV movie
1993	Donato and Daughter	Russ Loring	TV movie
1993	The Adventures of Brisco County, Jr.	Brett Bones	Episode: "Riverboat"
1993	The X-Files	Dr. Hodge	Episode: "Ice"
1993	Attack of the 50 Ft. Woman	Second Man	TV movie
1994	Roswell	Sherman Carson	TV movie
1994	Good Advice	Bernard	Episode: "A Chance of Showers"
1994	New York Undercover	Dr. Carl Weschler	Episode: "Blondes Have More Fun"
1995	Partners	Christopher Nnngaarzh	Episode: "Why Are the Blumenthals Living in My House?"
1995	Pointman	J.W. Mainwaring	Episode: "'bout Money"
1995, 1996	Gargoyles	Iago, Coldsteel	Voice roles, 2 episodes
1995–1997	Aaahh!!! Real Monsters	Snav, Urbab, Abraham Lincoln, Manager #4	Voice roles, 12 episodes
1996	Nash Bridges	Neil Wojack	Episode: "Genesis"
1996	Within the Rock	Ryan	TV movie
1996	The Outer Limits	Terry McCammon	Episode: "Falling Star"
1996	If These Walls Could Talk	John Barrows	TV movie, segment: "1974"
1996	Mighty Ducks: The Animated Series	Phineas T. Viper	Voice, episode: "Beak to the Future"
1996	The Tick	Octopagnini	Voice, episode: "Tick vs. Europe"
1996	For Hope	Date #4	TV movie (uncredited)
1996	Apollo 11	Buzz Aldrin	TV movie
1996, 1997	Life with Louie	Pro Shop Cashier, Store Manager	Voice roles, 2 episodes
1997	High Incident	Sergeant Hackworth	Episode: "No Money Down"
1997	Duckman	Hans	Voice, episode: "Duckman and Cornfed in 'Haunted Society Plumbers'"
1997	Johnny Bravo	Melvin, Maitre D', Movie Star	Voice roles, episode: "Substitute Teacher/A Wolf in Chick's Clothing/Intensive Care"
1997	Women: Stories of Passion	Jim "Jimbo"	Episode: "Reading for Pleasure"
1997	Superman: The Animated Series	Sergeant Corey Mills	Voice, episode: "Prototype"
1997	Players	Marcus Flint	Episode: "Con Law"
1997	Extreme Ghostbusters	Additional voices	2 episodes
1997	Breast Men	Male Interviewer	TV movie
1998	Jumanji	Mr. Schreem	Voice, episode: "Return of Squint"
1998	Winchell	Gavreau	TV movie
1998	ER	Detective Wilson	Episode: "Good Luck, Ruth Johnson"
1999	NetForce	Bo Tyler	TV movie
1999	The Wild Thornberrys	Stoat, Barking Deer #2	Voice roles, 2 episodes
1999	Rocket Power	MacKenzie's Father	Voice, episode: "Hawaii Blues/Lost and Find"
2000	Three	Warden	Episode: "Break Out"
2001	Batman Beyond	Dr. Childes	Voice, episode: "Curse of the Kobra"
2001	Going to California	Clay Shelton	Episode: "Lily of the Field"
2001	Justice League	General Brak	Voice, episode: "The Enemy Below"
2001	Wolf Lake	Carl	Episode: "Unaired Pilot" (uncredited)
2001–2003	24	George Mason	Recurring role (season 1), main cast (season 2)
2002	The Court	Keith Nolan	3 episodes
2003	The Twilight Zone	Harry Kellogg	Episode: "The Pharaoh's Curse"
2003	Spider-Man: The New Animated Series	Mayor	Voice, episode: "Spider-Man Dis-Abled"
2003	Karen Sisco	Alvin Simmons	Episode: "The One That Got Away"
2003–2004	CSI: Crime Scene Investigation	Sheriff Rory Atwater	5 episodes
2004, 2005	Teen Titans	Mento, Warp, General Immortus	Voice roles, 3 episodes
2005	Law & Order	Clay Pollack	Episode: "Fluency"
2006	Magma: Volcanic Disaster	Peter Shepherd	TV movie
2006	The West Wing	Frank Hollis	Episode: "Institutional Memory"
2007	Law & Order: Criminal Intent	George Pagolis	Episode: "Albatross"
2007	The Batman	Paul Karon	Voice, episode: "Rumors"
2007	Standoff	Paul Fisk	Episode: "No Strings"
2007	Bones	Dr. Bancroft	Episode: "Intern in the Incinerator"
2008	Boston Legal	Assistant District Attorney Rex Swarthmore	Episode: "Mad About You"
2008	Jericho	John Smith	3 episodes (uncredited)
2008	Wainy Days	Cornelius	Episode: "Rebecca"
2008	Criminal Minds	Detective Hyde	Episode: "Memoriam"
2008–2009	The Spectacular Spider-Man	Quentin Beck / Mysterio	Voice, 4 episodes
2008, 2013	The Mentalist	Sheriff Thomas McAllister	Guest cast (episode 2), recurring role (season 6)
2009	Batman: The Brave and the Bold	Sinestro	Voice, episode: "The Eyes of Despero!"
2009	Medium	Mitchell Slocombe	Episode: "A Person of Interest"
2009	The Closer	Detective Curt Landry	Episode: "Waivers of Extradition"
2010	Three Rivers	Sergeant Harold Estes	Episode: "Status 1A"
2010	Ben 10: Ultimate Alien	Warden Morgg, Trukk	Voice roles, episode: "...Nor Iron Bars a Cage"
2010–2012	Nikita	Percy Rose	Main cast (seasons 1–2)
2010–2012	The Booth at the End	The Man	Lead character
2011	Five	Peter	TV movie
2012	Entanglement	Peter Keller	TV movie
2013	Being Human	Liam McLean	Recurring role (season 3)
2013	NTSF:SD:SUV	Theodore Dent	Episode: "The Great Train Stoppery"
2013, 2015	Longmire	Jeremiah Rains	2 episodes
2014	Justified	Charles Monroe	2 episodes
2014	Beware the Batman	Manhunter / Paul Kirk	Voice, episode: "Unique"
2014–2015	Salem	Magistrate Hale	Main cast (season 1), guest (season 2)
2015	Zoo	Ronnie "Dogstick" Brannigan	4 episodes
2015–2016	12 Monkeys	Colonel Jonathan Foster	3 episodes
2015–2016	Aquarius	Police Commissioner	3 episodes
2016–2018	The Walking Dead	Gregory	Guest (seasons 6), Also starring (seasons 7–9)
2018	Supergirl	Peter Lockwood	Episode: "Man of Steel"
2020	MacGyver	General John Acosta	Episode: "Red Cell + Quantum + Cold + Committed"
2020	Bull	Judge Hollingsworth	Episode: "The Sovereigns"
2020	FBI: Most Wanted	Maurice Hewitt	Episode: "Deconflict"
2022	The Republic of Sarah	Paul Cooper	Recurring role
2023	The Mandalorian	Captain Gilad Pellaeon	Episode: "Chapter 23: The Spies"
2024	Star Wars: Tales of the Empire	Captain Gilad Pellaeon	Voice, episode: "The Path of Anger"

=== Video games ===
Year	Title	Role
2003	Freelancer	Dexter Hovis
2010	Batman: The Brave and the Bold – The Videogame	Sinestro
2023	Guild Wars 2	Isgarren
