= Karle Warren =

American actress

- Born: Salinas, California, U.S.
- Occupation: Actress
- Years active: 1998–2010

Karle Warren (February 8, 1992) is an American actress, known for her portrayal as Lauren Cassidy, the daughter of Judge Amy Gray, in the CBS hit drama, Judging Amy.

== Filmography ==
Film and television
Year	Title	Role	Notes
1998–99	DiResta	Anna DiResta	Main role
1999	Frank Leaves for the Orient	Girl Scout	"Quit Your Job"
1999–05	Judging Amy	Lauren Cassidy	Main role
2000	For the Love of May	Sarah	Short
2002	Lilo & Stitch	Additional Voice	
2010	Crazy on the Outside	Alex Luboja	
