= Judging Amy =

American drama television series (1999–2005)

- Genre: Legal drama
- Created by: Amy Brenneman; Bill D'Elia; John Tinker; Connie Tavel
- Developed by: Barbara Hall
- Directed by: Nancy Malone
- Starring: Amy Brenneman; Dan Futterman; Richard T. Jones; Jessica Tuck; Marcus Giamatti; Karle Warren; Tyne Daly; Jillian Armenante; Kevin Rahm; Timothy Omundson
- Country of origin: United States
- Original language: English
- No. of seasons: 6
- No. of episodes: 138

Production
- Executive producers: Amy Brenneman; Joseph Stern; Connie Tavel; Hart Hanson; Barbara Hall; James Frawley; Alex Taub
- Producers: Natalie Chaidez; Helen Shaver; Lyla Oliver; Carol Barbee; Barry O'Brien
- Running time: 60 minutes
- Production companies: Barbara Hall/Joseph Stern Productions; CBS Productions; 20th Century Fox Television

Original release
- Network: CBS
- Release: September 19, 1999 – May 3, 2005

Judging Amy is an American legal drama television series that was telecast from September 19, 1999, through May 3, 2005, on CBS. This television series was produced by Barbara Hall/Joseph Stern Productions, CBS Productions and 20th Century Fox Television and starred Amy Brenneman and Tyne Daly. Its main character (Brenneman) is a judge who serves in a family court for the Connecticut Superior Court's Hartford district; in addition to the family-related cases that she adjudicates, many episodes focus on her experiences as a divorced mother and on the experiences of her mother, a social worker in the field of child welfare. This series was based on the life experiences of Brenneman's mother.

== Plot ==
Amy Gray, an attorney and Harvard University graduate, moves back to her hometown of Hartford, Connecticut after separating from her husband Michael in New York City. She and her six-year-old daughter Lauren move in with her widowed mother, Maxine Gray who is a caseworker for the Connecticut Department of Children and Families. The move back to Hartford also reunites Amy with her two brothers. Her older brother Peter juggles the operations of their late father's insurance company along with the struggles he and his wife Gillian are facing towards starting a family due to fertility issues. At the same time, Amy's younger brother Vincent an aspiring writer, struggles to jumpstart his career while working odd-end jobs. Later on, Amy's cousin Kyle McCarthy, a former med student, returns to help cope with the rehabilitation of his drug addiction. In her line of work Amy takes on a wide variety of challenging cases, with the assistance of her Court Services Officer Bruce van Exel and Court Clerk Donna Kozlowski both of whom she ultimately becomes good friends with. In the de facto series finale (the series was canceled after the conclusion of the season) Amy quits the judiciary to run for the U.S. Senate.

== Characters ==
Character	Actor	Season					
Character	Actor	1	2	3	4	5	6
Amy Gray	Amy Brenneman	Main	Main	Main	Main	Main	Main
Vincent Gray	Dan Futterman	Main	Main	Main		Special guest	Main
Bruce Calvin van Exel	Richard T. Jones	Main	Main	Main	Main	Main	Main
Gillian Gray	Jessica Tuck	Main	Main	Main	Main	Main	Main
Peter Gray	Marcus Giamatti	Main	Main	Main	Main	Main	Main
Lauren Cassidy	Karle Warren	Main	Main	Main	Main	Main	Main
Maxine Gray	Tyne Daly	Main	Main	Main	Main	Main	Main
Donna Kozlowski	Jillian Armenante	Recurring	Main	Main	Main	Main	Main
Kyle McCarthy	Kevin Rahm			Main	Main	Main	Special guest
Sean Potter	Timothy Omundson		Recurring	Recurring	Recurring	Recurring	Main

=== Main ===
The Cast.

- Judge Amy Madison Gray, played by Amy Brenneman: After separating from her husband, Amy Gray returns to her childhood home with her daughter, becomes a judge on Connecticut's family court, gets a divorce, and tries to get on with her life. Balancing her new job, her family, and trying to rebuild her love life is not easy, but she keeps trying. She makes a name for herself in family court for her unusual methods and sentences and her stubbornness, which sometimes gets her in trouble. She dates several men. Her longest and more serious relationships are with lawyer Stuart Collins and David McClaren. Amy and Stuart dislike each other at first, but when she asks him to be Eric Black's lawyer, they get closer and eventually get engaged. However, Amy leaves him at the altar on their wedding day, saying he has a way of always convincing her to do things she does not want to do, calling him "a bully". She meets David McClaren during her short stint in the criminal court, and things are rocky from the start. Amy becomes pregnant by him and they plan to marry, but things fall apart when she miscarries and they part ways soon thereafter. In the last episode of the series, she quits the judiciary to run for Senate, to try to prevent the passage of a law that will effectively end the juvenile justice system by allowing the State's Attorney's office to try teenagers as adults at their own discretion. Amy's often complicated and ever changing definition of a relationship with her Court Services Officer, Bruce Van Exel, whom she calls her "best friend" and with whom she's shared intimate moments – despite his refusal to date white women, ends with him coming to be with her in Washington as she testifies at a Senate Hearing.
- Maxine McCarty Gray, played by Tyne Daly: She is Amy's widowed mother. A social worker for the Department of Children and Families, she had retired, but she returns to the job at the start of the series. She is willing to do whatever it takes to help the children in her care, even bending the law. She is an opinionated, strong-willed woman, very set in her ways, and capable of holding long grudges (she has not spoken to her brother in over 12 years), but loving to her family. Her relationship with daughter Amy is often not easy, since they are so much alike. After a troubled courtship, she becomes engaged to a wealthy businessman, Jared Duff, but he dies 48 hours before their wedding (a storyline twist necessitated by the unexpected death of the actor Richard Crenna, who played the character). She later becomes involved in a very complicated, on-again off-again relationship to her landscape designer Ignacio Messina. She suffers two heart attacks in the last season and has to undergo open heart surgery, but makes certain lifestyle changes and recovers well. At the end of the series she accepts Ignacio's marriage proposal and is set to retire again, becoming a foster parent to the last child she helped.
- Vincent Gray played by Dan Futterman (seasons 1–3 & 6; special guest season 5): He is Amy's gifted younger brother, with whom she has always been closest. Vincent is the winner of a Pushcart Prize during college, but then went on a backpack tour of Europe because he was overwhelmed with the expectations for success. He later writes a novel titled A Fortunate Son, about a Rabbi and his son. He sells the rights to this book to a movie company, who he says are going to turn the Rabbi and other characters into walk-ins. He's torn about giving up his characters and turns to his sister Amy, who advises him to "take the money and run", given that he is about to move to San Francisco with his new wife. He later gets a deal for a collection of short stories, but is unable to meet the deadline after the emotional stress of his divorce and he had to give back the considerable advance ($15,000) that he was paid. At the beginning of the series, he is roommates with a man with whom he owns a dog-washing business. When his roommate gets married, he becomes roommates with Donna, with whom he later becomes best friends. As he attempts to continue his writing career, he holds a number of jobs: dogwasher, reporter, and freelancer. He eventually marries his girlfriend, Carole Tobey (Sara Mornell), who has breast cancer, and leaves with her for San Francisco. The impending move causes Amy to become angry with Vincent, but when Amy finds out about Carole's breast cancer, she makes amends with him, gives him legal advice on his movie deal – even giving him the family's good luck talisman "the Surfing Monkey" at the airport. He comes home briefly when his mother calls and asks him to come help Maxine and Amy patch things up – as a fight has resulted in Amy moving out with extreme tension existing between mother and daughter. Because of Vincent's visit, Amy buys the family home, Maxine becomes a renter, and the family is put back together. Sometime later, his cousin Kyle arranges for him to arrive as a surprise to Amy's wedding to Stuart Collins. The wedding never happens. He returns home permanently soon after, explaining that Carole has left him for her oncologist. He later explains that this was because he couldn't "be there" for her in the way that she needed him to be while her doctor could. Stuck after his book deal is canceled and he is in debt to the publishing company, he starts driving for the Department of Social Services, then gets a job at a teen center. When a teen is shot in front of him, his boss goes on a bender and realizes she's "addicted" to Vincent and gets him a job teaching writing at a Maximum Security Detention Center. Vincent seems to attract bad luck – he gets shot while helping a woman being mugged in a grocery store parking lot, then later gets blown up and loses his ability to walk and read.
- Peter Gray, played by Marcus Giamatti: He is Amy's older brother. He inherited the family business from his father and he is good at it, even if he wasn't given a choice. He is a good man who sometimes surprises people with some outbursts. He and his wife Gillian have been trying to start a family for several years, but their inability to have children of their own leads to them pursuing adoption. Through their adoption agency, they are chosen by a pregnant woman named Evie as adoptive parents to her baby. She gives birth to a boy who Peter and Gillian name Edward, after Peter's late father, but call him Ned for short. Shortly after Ned's adoption is completed, Evie returns and reclaims her son after Ned's biological father reemerges, but ends up returning him to Peter and Gillian after her arrangements don't work out. Sometime after adopting Ned, Gillian gets pregnant and gives birth to another son, Walt. Things get rocky after Walt's birth and they separate for a while, even dating other people. Peter goes through a "rebellion" phase, trying to recall his teenage dreams, until he finds out his business is almost bankrupt. Soon after, he reconciles with his wife.
- Gillian Gray, played by Jessica Tuck: She is Peter's wife. A high strung controlling woman with a good heart, she completely loves her husband. She is usually well-meaning, but also often obsessive and nerve-wracking. After being unable to get pregnant, they adopt baby Ned. Sometime later, however, she gets pregnant, but things go wrong during the delivery of Walt, and she falls into a coma for a while. She and Peter have problems soon after (and she dates another man) but they reconcile.
- Lauren Cassidy, played by Karle Warren: She is Amy's daughter, six years old at the start of the series. A mostly well-adjusted girl, she is going through the pains of childhood and preadolescence with divorced parents, but a loving family. She struggles over her father's relationship with his new girlfriend Leesha, whom she likes at first. When Lauren is 12, her uncle Peter takes her for her haircut and she returns home with her long straight hair cut into a hipper, shoulder-length cut. Her boyfriend Victor turns out to be the son of one of her mother's later boyfriends, David McClaren, which causes Lauren to feel awkward and disgusted. When Amy becomes pregnant with David's child, Lauren reveals what a total blow to her social life this will be and is furious. She later becomes accepting and supporting of her mother after she miscarries. Toward the end of the series, Lauren begins to hang out with a group of friends who embrace the straight edge culture, which puts her at odds with her mother.
- Kyle McCarty played by Kevin Rahm (seasons 3–5; special guest season 6): He is Amy's cousin, the son of Maxine's estranged brother Richard (William Devane). He is a former medical student who was expelled because he was addicted to Dilaudid. Shunning his father, he comes to his aunt Maxine for help. She gives him a home and gets him a job as a counselor at a facility for runaway teens. He later moves in to share a flat with Donna after Vincent leaves and finds a hospital willing to give him a new chance to finish his medical residency, and gets into a complicated on/off relationship with fellow doctor Heather Labonte, as well as fighting an attraction to his supervisor, Dr. Lily Reddicker. After his father dies, he quits his job and finds a new path in life as a medic with the SWAT unit. He finally decides to accompany his ex-girlfriend Heather to Minnesota and take care of their son while she is in rehabilitation.
- Bruce Calvin van Exel, played by Richard T. Jones: He is Amy's court services officer, who becomes her friend. The series addresses a number of issues of their cross-racial friendship and how each feels about it. Bruce is a stubborn man with strong convictions, whose advice Amy comes to find invaluable. He has a daughter, Rebecca, whose mother breaks up with him after he gives her an ultimatum to get married after they've lived together for a number of years. At one point, Bruce is suspended from work for punching a man. He performs community service in a soup kitchen before returning to work with Amy. He is a fairly devout Catholic and not thrilled when his sister Winnie takes Rebecca to her more traditional black church with 'more interesting prayers'. Rebecca and Lauren attend the same middle school. In the second-to-last episode, he quits his job to complete his master's degree in family counseling, something he'd always wanted to do. The attraction between Amy and him is sometimes acknowledged, but never really explored until he comes to be by her side at the end of the series. "You came" "you called" and they hold hands.
- Donna Kozlowski played by Jillian Armenante (seasons 2–6; recurring season 1): She is Amy's court clerk. An eccentric woman, she is from a wealthy family, but estranged from them. Donna is a genius (she finishes her Juris Doctor degree in one and a half years) and socially awkward. She is married to a convicted murderer, Oscar Ray Pant, and becomes roommates with Amy's brother Vincent. While living with him, she has a daughter by Oscar, Ariadne Gray Pant, to whom she gives birth in a plastic pool in Amy's living room. Her mother arrives while Donna is in the pool, but is unable to offer her support and leaves. Maxine ends up getting in the pool with Donna. Later, Oscar confesses to Donna that he is really guilty and she divorces him. Upon passing the bar examination, Amy fires her so she would go to work as a lawyer; she becomes a court-appointed minor counsel for the Hartford Youth Advocates, whose office is across the hall from Amy's.
- Sean Potter, played by Timothy Omundson (season 6; recurring seasons 2–5): He is Maxine's boss and later friend, who has his hands full dealing with Maxine's unorthodox methods. Initially a bit green in his supervisory role, he loosens up over time after his exposure to and friendship with Maxine. Sean and Bruce become friends and work together to establish alternative treatment programs for youthful offenders (such as "Gun 101"), and Sean is revealed in one episode as an avid karaoke singer, which comes in handy for entertaining the guests at Amy's and Stuart's wedding (which does not quite come off). Sean is also revealed to have come from a rich family, had attended expensive private school, and one time attempts to establish a scholarship fund in honor of his grandfather but the fundraiser doesn't work. Sean also dates Courtney Messina, the daughter of Maxine's beau, Ignacio, for a while, entertaining her elderly grandmother with a rendition of "Vaya con Dios".

=== Recurring ===
- Eric Black, played by Blake Bashoff: He is a gay teenager who had been so badly abused that he was blind for two years. When all else fails, Maxine reluctantly takes him into her home, where he rapidly bonds with the family; afterwards, Sean becomes his foster father. Eventually, Eric protectively confronts and kills a stalker after Amy and Lauren. He is tried and found not guilty, but does so by lying on the witness stand. Maxine is disappointed in him, so he decides to move to Canada with his boyfriend, Mark.
- Dr. Lily Reddicker, played by Kristin Lehman: She is the hospital chief of staff who takes a chance by hiring Amy's cousin Kyle. She is a no-nonsense supervisor who recognizes Kyle's superb medical skills and his need to return to medicine, which he tries to hide behind a sarcastic view of the world. She fights an attraction to Kyle because of their professional relationship and her fears that pursuing it create problems for Kyle because of his addiction problems. Kyle soon becomes troubled by his attraction to both Dr. Lily and a fellow resident, Heather Labonte.
- Heather Labonte, played by Sarah Danielle Madison: She is a doctor at Kyle's hospital with a substance abuse problem, who gets busted with a drug test and then gets a job as a bartender, which she says is a better job with better pay. She has an on/off relationship with Kyle, until she gets pregnant. Kyle doesn't believe she was pregnant, and claims he even visited her father who also said there was no baby. When Heather returns and tells Kyle she is going into rehab and the baby would be staying with her sister, he still doesn't believe her – until his Aunt Maxine literally beats on his chest and yells at him "don't you dare abandon your son!" and, after apologizing, reminds him that the best decisions aren't the easy ones. As a result, Kyle decides to accompany Heather to Minnesota and take care of their son while she is in rehabilitation.
- Louann "Crystal" Turner, played by Jennifer Esposito: She is a former meth addict who runs an outreach program for homeless teenagers. She had a relationship with Vincent and worked with him until they witness a young prostitute get murdered. She goes on a bender and tries to seduce Vincent. When she gets sober, she realizes they can't work together and she arranges for him to work at a youth detention center to teach a creative writing class.
- Graciela Reyes, played by Tara Correa-McMullen: She is a gang member Amy counsels. As time passes, she makes progress, though she is arrested one day for murder, as she was in the car with her cousin when she was involved in a drive-by shooting. Graciela is tried and found guilty as an adult because of a cousin's lies on the witness stand, and thus being sent to adult prison. The cousin later recants, but Graciela is murdered in a gang retaliation before Amy can get her out of prison. (See also #Murdered cast member below.)
- Rob Holbrook, played by Jim Parsons: He is a young clerk hired by Amy to replace Donna after her departure. Innocent and extremely eager to please, he proves his worth when his knowledge of Spanish comes into play in a case. Later, when Amy is banned from Graciela's trial, he goes in her stead and reports back to her all that happens. He enjoys cake and playing ball.
- Courtney Messina, played by Jossara Jinaro (died 2022): She is Ignacio Messina's (Cheech Marin) daughter and Sean Potter's (Timothy Omundson) girlfriend.

==== Amy's love interests ====
- Michael Cassidy (John Slattery, Richard Burgi): He is Amy's ex-husband. He divorced Amy and married a woman named Leesha, who was younger and blonder than Amy. Michael tried to obtain full custody of Lauren, hoping his daughter would help him to mend his second marriage. He dropped the case when Leesha left him. He told Amy, though he stood by what he said about her in court, she was still a better parent than he.
- Rob Meltzer (Tom Welling): He is Lauren's karate teacher, with whom Amy had a short fling. She dumped him for Tom Gillette, but later went back to Rob.
- Tom Gillette (Gregory Harrison): Tom left Amy so he could return to his estranged wife.
- Barry Krumble (Chris Sarandon): He is a fellow judge, whom Amy dated briefly. He "saved" her from embarrassment at her 10-year college reunion, but the relationship fizzled out when she realized they were not meant for each other because he could not "live in the moment" the way she did.
- Stuart Collins (Reed Diamond): He is a lawyer who, after several on/offs, became engaged to Amy. They rekindled their relationship when she asked him to be Eric Black's lawyer, but she ended the relationship by leaving him at the altar. Six months later, she learned he had married a 22-year-old Polynesian woman whom he met on the trip that was supposed to have been their honeymoon.
- David McClaren (Adrian Pasdar): He is a widowed assistant state's attorney and the father of Lauren's boyfriend, Victor. His relationship with Amy was rocky from the beginning, as he was still dealing with his wife's murder. He attended victims' support group meetings, one of which he asked Amy to attend. Amy became pregnant by him, and they planned to buy a house together. Amy had a miscarriage and, in her grief, kept David at a distance. This resulted in him breaking up with her.

==== Maxine's love interests ====
- Jared Duff (Richard Crenna): He is a wealthy businessman who met Maxine at a local diner, which he later purchased for her. Things between them became rocky several times, once because of his son's opposition to the relationship. They became engaged in 2003, but Jared died two days before the wedding.
- Ignacio Messina (Cheech Marin): He is the landscape designer whom Maxine hired to work on her garden. The two became close, but Maxine learned he was not legally divorced from his wife and he had two children: Courtney Messina (Jossara Jinaro) and Raul Messina (Tito Ortiz). Ignacio's mother hated Maxine, which she found extremely funny. Maxine refused to date him when she learned his divorce wasn't final. They continued their friendship bound by a complicated set of rules Maxine established to prove they weren't dating. He remained very supportive during Maxine's health problems. When his divorce became final, they began dating again in a complicated relationship. At one point Maxine thought they were getting too close and she actually gave him away to her friend Patsy. She later regretted it and asked Ignacio to dump Patsy. He refuses to live by Maxine's ever-changing rules and confronts her with a marriage proposal as a solution, which she accepts.

== Murdered cast member ==
On October 21, 2005, five months after the series ended, 16-year-old Tara Correa – who played Graciela Reyes in the final season – was shot to death outside an apartment complex in Inglewood, California, where she lived with her gang member boyfriend. A rival gang member, 20-year-old Damien Watts, was charged with her murder on March 1, 2006; he was convicted on January 23, 2009. When charged, Watts was in custody for a separate deadly shooting. Watts was sentenced on February 27, 2009 to life imprisonment, with no chance of parole.

== Production ==
Judging Amy takes place in Hartford, Connecticut. Although the show often shows the Hartford Judicial District Court as having the address of 1265 (street unknown), the actual address of the Hartford Judicial District is 95 Washington Street, family matters are heard on 90 Washington Street and the Superior Court Juvenile Matters of Hartford is in 920 Broad Street, Hartford, CT 06106.

== Episodes ==
=== Series overview ===
Season	Episodes	Originally released	
Season	Episodes	First released	Last released
1	23	September 19, 1999	May 23, 2000
2	22	October 10, 2000	May 22, 2001
3	24	September 25, 2001	May 21, 2002
4	24	October 1, 2002	May 13, 2003
5	23	September 23, 2003	May 18, 2004
6	22	September 28, 2004	May 3, 2005

=== Season 1 (1999–2000) ===
No. overall	No. in season	Title	Directed by	Written by	Original release date	Prod. code	U.S. viewers (millions)
1	1	"Pilot"	James Hayman	Story by : John Tinker & Bill D'Elia; Teleplay by : Barbara Hall & John Tinker & Bill D'Elia	September 19, 1999	1ADG01	19.57
2	2	"Short Calendar"	Jack Bender	Nicole Yorkin & Dawn Prestwich	September 21, 1999	1ADG02	13.50
3	3	"Trial by Jury"	James Hayman	Natalie Chaidez	September 28, 1999	1ADG04	15.70
4	4	"Victim Soul"	James Frawley	Barbara Hall	October 5, 1999	1ADG03	16.16
5	5	"Last Tango in Hartford"	James Frawley	Nicole Yorkin & Dawn Prestwich	October 12, 1999	1ADG05	16.46
6	6	"Witch Hunt"	Ken Olin	Paul Karon	October 19, 1999	1ADG06	15.63
7	7	"Impartial Bias"	James Hayman	David W. Zucker	November 2, 1999	1ADG07	15.62
8	8	"Near Death Experience"	Kevin Dowling	Angel Dean Lopez	November 9, 1999	1ADG08	15.91
9	9	"The Persistence of Tectonics"	Joe Ann Fogle	Randall Caldwell	November 23, 1999	1ADG09	14.35
10	10	"Crowded House"	Martha Mitchell	Lyla Oliver	November 30, 1999	1ADG10	15.56
11	11	"Presumed Innocent"	James Hayman	Natalie Chaidez	December 14, 1999	1ADG11	15.70
12	12	"Spoil the Child"	Kristoffer Tabori	Nicole Yorkin & Dawn Prestwich	January 11, 2000	1ADG12	14.91
13	13	"Zero to Sixty"	Anita W. Addison	David Silverman & Marcy Gray Rubin	January 18, 2000	1ADG13	14.45
14	14	"Shaken, Not Stirred"	David Semel	Kerry Lenhart & John J. Sakmar	February 8, 2000	1ADG14	14.58
15	15	"Culture Class"	Jack Bender	Ted Mann	February 15, 2000	1ADG15	15.23
16	16	"The Wee Hours"	James Hayman	Hart Hanson	February 22, 2000	1ADG16	14.85
17	17	"Drawing the Line"	Jack Bender	Lyla Oliver & Randall Caldwell	February 29, 2000	1ADG17	15.30
18	18	"Human Touch"	Martha Mitchell	Joshua Stern	March 21, 2000	1ADG18	14.20
19	19	"The Out-of-Towners"	Bob McCracken	Hart Hanson & David W. Zucker	April 18, 2000	1ADG19	13.57
20	20	"The God Thing"	Kevin Dowling	Karen Hall	May 2, 2000	1ADG20	14.81
21	21	"Gray vs. Gray"	James Hayman	Kerry Lenhart & John J. Sakmar	May 9, 2000	1ADG21	14.54
22	22	"Not with a Whimper"	David Platt	Nicole Yorkin & Dawn Prestwich	May 16, 2000	1ADG22	15.77
23	23	"Blast from the Past"	James Hayman	Barbara Hall	May 23, 2000	1ADG23	14.99

=== Season 2 (2000–01) ===
No. overall	No. in season	Title	Directed by	Written by	Original release date	Prod. code	U.S. viewers (millions)
24	1	"Zero Tolerance"	James Hayman	Barbara Hall	October 10, 2000	2ADG01	16.42
25	2	"You're Not the Boss of Me"	Kevin Dowling	Nicole Yorkin & Dawn Prestwich	October 24, 2000	2ADG02	14.93
26	3	"Instincts"	Martin Davidson	Lyla Oliver	October 31, 2000	2ADG03	15.02
27	4	"Convictions"	Martha Mitchell	Randall Caldwell	November 14, 2000	2ADG04	15.54
28	5	"Unnecessary Roughness"	David Platt	Hart Hanson	November 21, 2000	2ADG05	16.84
29	6	"The Burden of Perspective"	Kristoffer Tabori	Joseph Dougherty	November 28, 2000	2ADG06	15.21
30	7	"Dog Days"	James Hayman	Karen Hall	December 5, 2000	2ADG07	14.32
31	8	"Waterworld"	Bob McCracken	Nicole Yorkin & Dawn Prestwich	December 19, 2000	2ADG08	16.95
32	9	"The Undertow"	Jack Bender	Hart Hanson	January 9, 2001	2ADG09	13.86
33	10	"Adoption Day"	James Hayman	Paul Karon	January 16, 2001	2ADG10	15.43
34	11	"The Claw is Our Master"	Arvin Brown	Karen Hall	January 30, 2001	2ADG11	13.67
35	12	"8 1/2 Narrow"	Helen Shaver	Joseph Dougherty	February 6, 2001	2ADG12	14.70
36	13	"The Beginning, the End, and the Murky Middle"	Elodie Keene	Thad Mumford	February 13, 2001	2ADG13	14.70
37	14	"One For the Road"	Brad Silberling	Lyla Oliver	February 20, 2001	2ADG14	13.95
38	15	"The Treachery of Compromise"	Andrew Robinson	Randall Caldwell	February 27, 2001	2ADG15	11.26
39	16	"Everybody Falls Down"	Jack Bender	Story by : Sibyl Gardner; Teleplay by : Joseph Dougherty	March 20, 2001	2ADG16	13.35
40	17	"Romeo and Juliet Must Die—Well, Maybe Just Juliet"	Kristoffer Tabori	Hart Hanson	April 10, 2001	2ADG17	13.39
41	18	"The Unforgiven"	James Hayman	Story by : Karen Hall & Hart Hanson; Teleplay by : Karen Hall	April 24, 2001	2ADG18	12.39
42	19	"Between the Wanting and the Getting"	Joseph Dougherty	Dawn Prestwich & Nicole Yorkin & Joseph Dougherty	May 1, 2001	2ADG19	12.78
43	20	"Grounded"	James Hayman	Dawn Comer Jefferson	May 8, 2001	2ADG20	13.72
44	21	"Redheaded Stepchild"	James Hayman	Barbara Hall & Karen Hall & Hart Hanson	May 15, 2001	2ADG21	14.42
45	22	"Hold on Tight"	Kenneth Zunder	Barbara Hall	May 22, 2001	2ADG22	14.66

=== Season 3 (2001–02) ===
No. overall	No. in season	Title	Directed by	Written by	Original release date	Prod. code	U.S. viewers (millions)
46	1	"The Last Word"	Daniel Sackheim	Barbara Hall	September 25, 2001	3ADG01	15.60
47	2	"Off the Grid"	Jack Bender	Joseph Dougherty	October 2, 2001	3ADG02	15.76
48	3	"Darkness for Light"	David Platt	Hart Hanson	October 9, 2001	3ADG03	16.00
49	4	"The Right Thing to Do"	Joanna Kerns	Barbara Hall	October 16, 2001	3ADG04	16.06
50	5	"Look Closer"	Paul Michael Glaser	Lyla Oliver	October 23, 2001	3ADG05	17.56
51	6	"The Unbearable Lightness of Being Family"	Janet Davidson	Randall Caldwell	October 30, 2001	3ADG06	14.82
52	7	"Imbroglio"	Daniel Sackheim	Robert Girardi	November 6, 2001	3ADG07	14.63
53	8	"Rights of Passage"	Andrew Robinson	Paul Guyot	November 20, 2001	3ADG08	15.73
54	9	"Surprised by Gravity"	Kevin Dowling	Joseph Dougherty	November 27, 2001	3ADG09	16.06
55	10	"Beating the Bounds"	Keith Samples	Hart Hanson	December 11, 2001	3ADG10	14.43
56	11	"Crime and Puzzlement"	Elodie Keene	Karen Hall	December 18, 2001	3ADG11	14.08
57	12	"Who Shot Dick?"	Nancy Malone	Barbara Hall	January 8, 2002	3ADG12	16.06
58	13	"The Cook of the Money Pot"	James Hayman	Lyla Oliver	January 15, 2002	3ADG13	14.36
59	14	"The Extinction of the Dinosaurs"	Lee Shallat-Chemel	Randall Caldwell	January 22, 2002	3ADG14	15.40
60	15	"Can They Do That With Vegetables?"	Thomas R. Moore	Dawn Comer Jefferson	February 5, 2002	3ADG15	14.34
61	16	"Woman in Cacti With a Curled Up Rat"	Joe Ann Fogle	Karen Hall	February 26, 2002	3ADG16	14.61
62	17	"Not Stumbling, But Dancing"	Joseph Dougherty	Joseph Dougherty	March 5, 2002	3ADG17	14.69
63	18	"The Justice League of America"	Martha Mitchell	Hart Hanson	March 26, 2002	3ADG18	14.56
64	19	"Men Aren't Monsters"	Richard Gershman	Stephen Neigher	April 2, 2002	3ADG19	13.66
65	20	"The Bottle Show"	Andrew Robinson	Barry O'Brien	April 9, 2002	3ADG20	14.20
66	21	"Tidal Wave"	Kevin Dowling	Lyla Oliver & Randall Caldwell	April 23, 2002	3ADG21	13.36
67	22	"Boston Terriers from France"	Peter Levin	Story by : Karen Hall; Teleplay by : Paul Guyot & Dawn Comer Jefferson	May 7, 2002	3ADG22	12.65
68	23	"Nobody Expects the Spanish Inquisition"	Elodie Keene	Hart Hanson	May 14, 2002	3ADG23	13.29
69	24	"Come Back Soon"	Daniel Sackheim	Barbara Hall	May 21, 2002	3ADG24	14.00

=== Season 4 (2002–03) ===
No. overall	No. in season	Title	Directed by	Written by	Original release date	Prod. code	U.S. viewers (millions)
70	1	"Lost in the System"	James Frawley	Barbara Hall	October 1, 2002	4ADG01	15.74
71	2	"Thursday’s Child"	Joe Ann Fogle	Hart Hanson	October 8, 2002	4ADG02	14.37
72	3	"Every Stranger’s Face I See"	Peter Levin	Alex Taub	October 15, 2002	4ADG03	14.14
73	4	"The Frozen Zone"	Alan Myerson	Karen Hall	October 22, 2002	4ADG04	14.71
74	5	"Cause for Alarm"	Elodie Keene	Randall Caldwell	October 29, 2002	4ADG05	14.01
75	6	"Roses and Truth"	Kevin Dowling	Lyla Oliver	November 5, 2002	4ADG06	14.41
76	7	"Damage Control"	James Frawley	Paul Guyot	November 12, 2002	4ADG07	13.29
77	8	"A Pretty Good Day"	Joe Ann Fogle	Dawn Comer Jefferson	November 19, 2002	4ADG08	14.33
78	9	"Boys to Men"	Helen Shaver	Barbara Hall	November 26, 2002	4ADG09	14.68
79	10	"People of the Lie"	Andrew Robinson	Karen Hall	December 10, 2002	4ADG10	13.03
80	11	"Lost and Found"	James Hayman	Alex Taub	December 17, 2002	4ADG11	14.49
81	12	"Ye Olde Freedom Inn"	Kevin Dowling	Lyla Oliver	January 7, 2003	4ADG12	13.95
82	13	"The Best Interests of the Child"	Richard Gershman	Randall Caldwell	January 21, 2003	4ADG13	13.40
83	14	"Wild Card"	Alan Myerson	Matt Witten	February 4, 2003	4ADG15	13.56
84	15	"Maxine, Interrupted"	James Frawley	Karen Hall	February 11, 2003	4ADG14	13.90
85	16	"Sixteen Going on Seventeen"	Fred Gerber	Alex Taub	February 18, 2003	4ADG16	14.98
86	17	"Judging Eric"	Donna Deitch	Hart Hanson	February 25, 2003	4ADG17	14.59
87	18	"Looking for Quarters"	James Hayman	Paul Guyot	March 18, 2003	4ADG18	14.17
88	19	"Just Say Oops"	Helen Shaver	Dawn Comer Jefferson	April 1, 2003	4ADG19	12.19
89	20	"Requiem"	Peter Levin	Barbara Hall	April 15, 2003	4ADG20	12.09
90	21	"Picture of Perfect"	Kenneth Zunder	Stephanie Ripps	April 22, 2003	4ADG21	13.97
91	22	"CSO: Hartford"	James Frawley	Lyla Oliver & Paul Guyot	April 29, 2003	4ADG22	13.15
92	23	"Marry, Marry Quite Contrary"	Alan Myerson	James Stanley & Dianne Messina Stanley	May 6, 2003	4ADG23	13.29
93	24	"Shock and Awe"	James Frawley	Story by : Alex Taub; Teleplay by : Randall Caldwell & Dawn Comer Jefferson	May 13, 2003	4ADG24	12.79

=== Season 5 (2003–04) ===
No. overall	No. in season	Title	Directed by	Written by	Original release date	Prod. code	U.S. viewers (millions)
94	1	"Motion Sickness"	James Frawley	Alex Taub	September 23, 2003	5ADG01	11.85
95	2	"Going Down"	Paul Michael Glaser	Karen Hall	September 30, 2003	5ADG02	11.81
96	3	"Ex Parte of Five"	Helen Shaver	Carla Kettner	October 7, 2003	5ADG03	10.65
97	4	"Tricks of the Trade"	Peter Levin	Lyla Oliver	October 14, 2003	5ADG04	11.02
98	5	"The Wrong Man"	James Frawley	Carol Barbee	October 21, 2003	5ADG05	11.55
99	6	"Into the Fire"	Kevin Dowling	Paul Guyot	October 28, 2003	5ADG06	11.51
100	7	"Kilt Trip"	Alan Myerson	Karen Hall & Alex Taub	November 4, 2003	5ADG07	13.36
101	8	"The Long Goodbye"	Vincent Misiano	Barry O'Brien	November 11, 2003	5ADG08	11.78
102	9	"Rumspringa"	Mel Damski	Stephanie Ripps	November 25, 2003	5ADG09	11.63
103	10	"Sex and the Single Mother"	Karen Arthur	Story by : Carla Kettner; Teleplay by : Barry O'Brien & Paul Guyot	December 16, 2003	5ADG10	12.46
104	11	"Christenings"	Martha Mitchell	Carol Barbee	January 6, 2004	5ADG11	12.51
105	12	"Dancing in the Dark"	Andrew Robinson	Lyla Oliver	January 13, 2004	5ADG12	11.68
106	13	"Sins of the Father"	Richard Gershman	Alison Carey	February 3, 2004	5ADG13	11.16
107	14	"Roadhouse Blues"	Helen Shaver	Barry O'Brien	February 10, 2004	5ADG14	11.46
108	15	"Werewolves of Hartford"	Jessica Landaw	Paul Guyot	February 17, 2004	5ADG15	12.47
109	16	"Baggage Claim"	Lewis H. Gould	Story by : Stephanie Ripps; Teleplay by : Carol Barbee	February 24, 2004	5ADG16	11.29
110	17	"The Song that Never Ends"	James Frawley	Story by : Lyla Oliver; Teleplay by : Paul Guyot & Barry O'Brien	March 2, 2004	5ADG17	11.99
111	18	"Disposable"	Alan Myerson	Diego Gutierrez	March 16, 2004	5ADG18	11.61
112	19	"The Quick and the Dead"	Andrew Robinson	Lyla Oliver	April 6, 2004	5ADG19	10.43
113	20	"Slade’s Chophouse"	Fred Gerber	Karen Hall	April 27, 2004	5ADG20	11.63
114	21	"Predictive Neglect"	James Frawley	Rob Fresco	May 4, 2004	5ADG21	12.21
115	22	"My Little Runway"	Helen Shaver	Carol Barbee	May 11, 2004	5ADG22	12.28
116	23	"Sex, Lives and Expedia.com"	James Frawley	Story by : Paul Guyot & Barry O'Brien; Teleplay by : Karen Hall & Lyla Oliver	May 18, 2004	5ADG23	11.31

=== Season 6 (2004–05) ===
No. overall	No. in season	Title	Directed by	Written by	Original release date	Prod. code	U.S. viewers (millions)
117	1	"Accountability"	James Frawley	Richard Kramer & Carol Barbee	September 28, 2004	6ADG01	10.62
118	2	"Lullaby"	Helen Shaver	Barry O'Brien	October 12, 2004	6ADG02	10.47
119	3	"Legacy"	Fred Gerber	Constance M. Burge	October 19, 2004	6ADG03	10.14
120	4	"Consent"	Alan Myerson	Samuel Bernstein	October 26, 2004	6ADG04	10.75
121	5	"Order and Chaos"	Matt Shakman	Christopher Ambrose	November 23, 2004	6ADG05	10.29
122	6	"Catching It Early"	Lewis H. Gould	K.J. Steinberg	November 30, 2004	6ADG06	11.30
123	7	"Early Winter"	James Frawley	Stephen Scaia & Matthew Federman	December 7, 2004	6ADG07	11.48
124	8	"Conditional Surrender"	Helen Shaver	Matthew J. Lieberman	December 14, 2004	6ADG08	11.18
125	9	"Silent Era"	Martha Mitchell	Carol Barbee	January 11, 2005	6ADG09	10.78
126	10	"The Long Run"	Andrew Robinson	Barry O'Brien	January 18, 2005	6ADG10	11.53
127	11	"10,000 Steps"	Richard Gershman	Constance M. Burge	January 25, 2005	6ADG11	11.41
128	12	"You Don’t Know Me"	James Kramer	Christopher Ambrose	February 1, 2005	6ADG12	11.20
129	13	"Dream a Little Dream"	James Frawley	Adam Belanoff	February 15, 2005	6ADG13	10.95
130	14	"Happy Birthday"	Helen Shaver	Carol Barbee	February 22, 2005	6ADG14	10.86
131	15	"Hard to Get"	Bill Rauch	Matthew J. Lieberman	March 8, 2005	6ADG15	9.66
132	16	"The Paper War"	Fred Gerber	Stephen Scaia & Matthew Federman	March 15, 2005	6ADG16	10.32
133	17	"The New Normal"	Helen Shaver	David McMillan	March 22, 2005	6ADG17	9.92
134	18	"Sorry I Missed You"	Alan Myerson	K.J. Steinberg	April 5, 2005	6ADG18	10.51
135	19	"Revolutions Per Minute"	John Kent Harrison	Robert Levine	April 12, 2005	6ADG19	11.17
136	20	"Too Little, Too Late"	Jessica Landaw	Christopher Ambrose	April 19, 2005	6ADG20	10.84
137	21	"Getting Out"	Richard Gershman	Barry O'Brien	April 26, 2005	6ADG21	11.54
138	22	"My Name is Amy Gray…"	Helen Shaver	Carol Barbee	May 3, 2005	6ADG22	10.80

== Broadcast ==
After six seasons, Judging Amy was canceled by CBS on May 18, 2005. In the United States, repeats aired on TNT from 2003 until 2007. On July 17, 2011, UP (the former Gospel Music Channel) began airing the series daily, albeit with content and episode edits (including episode removals) to conform to the network's programming direction and ownership. Since February 2016 it has aired more intermittently on the network, mainly in the form of all-day marathons (episode removals have been relaxed under a more secular programming direction that included fellow Connecticut-set series Gilmore Girls being added to UP's schedule).

Judging Amy is broadcast in Australia on channels ELEVEN and 111 Hits and in New Zealand on Sky Open (formerly Prime). In Canada, the show aired on channel Séries+ and, beginning in September 2017, in French with described video on AMI-télé. Ireland's TV3 carried the show, as did UK stations Living TV, Hallmark, Channel 4, and CBS Drama, Israel's YES Base Channel also carries the show.

== Reception ==
=== Critical reception ===
Several reviewers have suggested the show took inspiration from the formula established by Providence. Reviewers also cite the relationship between Brenneman and Daly's characters as the selling point of the show. Also likely is the physical similarities at the time between Brenneman and the lead actress in Providence, Melina Kanakaredes.

Amy Gray makes reference to Providence in episode 3.18, "The Justice League of America". In this episode, Amy is attending her Harvard Law School class' tenth reunion, and her old friends cannot seem to remember Amy has moved to Hartford. They think she resides in Providence. Finally, Amy is pushed to state, "It's Hartford, David. Providence is a whole other universe."

=== Ratings ===
- Season 1: 21st – 14.1 million viewers
- Season 2: 28th – 13.3 million viewers
- Season 3: 21st – 13.9 million viewers
- Season 4: 26th – 13.1 million viewers
- Season 5: 39th – 10.7 million viewers
- Season 6: 37th – 10.6 million viewers
