= Connie Tavel =

American film producer

Connie Tavel is an American television and film executive producer and talent manager. She is partners with Helen Hunt in Hunt/Tavel Productions, and with Tim Johnson in Tavel/Johnson Television. She has served as executive producer on films such as Bill & Ted's Bogus Journey, Fever, and The Wishing Tree, as well as television movies such as Ride With The Wind and Summer's End. She also produced an episode of the television series Judging Amy, which she is credited as a co-creator.

In 2006, she produced Then She Found Me, a film written and directed by Helen Hunt.
