= Doug Palau =

American television writer and producer

- Occupation: Television writer
- Writing career
- Notable work: NYPD Blue

Doug Palau is an American television writer and producer. He has worked on the ABC crime drama NYPD Blue and has been nominated for an Emmy Award and an Edgar Award.

== Biography ==
Palau began writing for television for the third season of NBC crime drama Law & Order in 1993. The series follows a case from an investigation to the courts. It was created by Dick Wolf. Palau co-wrote the story (with René Balcer) and wrote the teleplay for the season finale "Benevolence". Palau returned as a writer for the fourth season and wrote the story and co-wrote the teleplay (with Ed Zuckerman) for the episode "Golden Years".

He was hired as a story editor for the first season of crime drama Murder One in 1995. The series was created by Steven Bochco, Charles H. Eglee and Channing Gibson and focused on a single homicide court case through its first season. Palau wrote or co-wrote seven episodes for the series first season. He wrote the episode "Chapter Seven". He wrote the teleplay for the episode "Chapter Nine" from a story by Bochco and William M. Finkelstein. He co-wrote the episode "Chapter Thirteen" with producer Geoffrey Neigher. He co-wrote the teleplay for the episode "Chapter Sixteen" with Neigher from a story by Eglee and Finkelstein. He co-wrote the teleplay for the episode "Chapter Eighteen" with Neigher from a story by Bochco and Finkelstein. He co-wrote the teleplay for the episode "Chapter Twenty" with Neigher from a story by Bochco and Eglee. He co-wrote the teleplay for the season finale "Chapter Twenty-Three" with Neigher from a story by Bochco, Eglee and Finkelstein.

He returned as an executive story editor for the second season of Murder One in 1996. The series changed its format to focus on multiple cases and replaced first season lead Daniel Benzali with Anthony LaPaglia. Palau was promoted to co-producer after three episodes of the season aired. Palau wrote or co-wrote a further eight episodes for the second season. He wrote the teleplay for the episode "Chapter Four, Year Two", "Chapter Six, Year Two", "Chapter Thirteen, Year Two" and "Chapter Sixteen, Year Two" based on stories by Bochco and Eglee. He co-wrote the teleplay for the episodes "Chapter One, Year Two", "Chapter Eight, Year Two" and "Chapter Fourteen, Year Two" with Neigher (now a supervising producer) based on stories by Bochco and Eglee. He co-wrote the teleplay for the season finale "Chapter Eighteen, Year Two" with Neigher, Eglee and Nick Harding based on a story by Bochco and Eglee. Murder One was canceled after completing its second season. Palau contributed to fifteen episodes of the series as a writer.

Palau continued to work with Bochco and Eglee on their next new series Total Security in 1997. Bocho and Eglee co-created the series with David Milch. The series centred on a firm of high tech security specialists in Los Angeles. Palau was a writer and co-producer for the series. He was joined by his frequent co-writer Geoffrey Neigher, who served as a supervising producer on Total Security. The series was canceled after thirteen episodes.

Palau became a writer for the NBC police drama Brooklyn South in January 1998. The series was created by Palau's Murder One colleagues Steven Bochco and William M. Finkelstein along with David Milch and retired police officer Bill Clark. Bochco, Finkelstein and Milch served as executive producers for the series along with Michael S. Chernuchin. Palau and Nicholas Wootton both moved from Total Security to join Brooklyn South. The show focused on a single precinct of patrol officers in New York. Palau co-wrote the teleplay for the episode "Tears on My Willow" with Wootton from a story by Bochco and Milch. He co-wrote the episodes "Dead Man Sleeping" and "Doggonit" with Wootton. Palau and Wootton wrote the teleplay for the episode "Skell in a Cell" from a story by Bochco, Clark, Finkelstein and Milch. Brooklyn South was canceled after completing its first season and Palau contributed to four episodes of the series as a writer. Palau and his co-writers were nominated for an Edgar Award for best television episode in 1999 for their work on "Skell in a Cell".

Following the cancellation of Brooklyn South Palau and Wootton moved on to work as writers and producers for the sixth season of Bochco and Milch's ABC police drama NYPD Blue in 1999. The series focused on a single unit of homicide detectives in New York. Palau wrote the teleplay for the episode "Raphael's Inferno" from a story by Milch and Clark. Palau and Wootton co-wrote the teleplay for the episode "Grime Scene" from a story by Milch and Clark. Palau and the production staff were nominated for the Emmy Award for Outstanding Drama Series at the September 1999 ceremony for their work on the sixth season.

In fall 1999 Palau became a producer and writer for the sixth season of medical drama ER. The series focused on the private and professional lives of doctors in a Chicago emergency department. He wrote the episode "Sins of the Fathers".

In 2000 he was hired as a writer and producer for Michael S. Chernuchin's series Bull. Palau had worked with Chernuchin on Brooklyn South. The series centered on a new firm of stock brokers. Palau wrote the episode "He Stoops to Conquer". The series was canceled while airing its first season.

In 2001 he became a writer and supervising producer for the drama The Agency. The series featured Benzali and focused on the workings of the Central Intelligence Agency. Palau left the crew after the first season. Also in 2001 he wrote the television feature Prince Charming.

In 2003 Palau was a supervising producer and writer for the NBC crime drama Kingpin. The series was created by David Mills. It followed a Mexican drug cartel and was canceled after airing only six episodes. NBC has subsequently marketed the series as a mini-series. Kingpin marked Palau's last television work.
