= Civil Wars (TV series) =

American legal drama TV series (1991-1993)

- Genre: Legal drama
- Created by: William M. Finkelstein
- Starring: Mariel Hemingway; Peter Onorati; Debi Mazar; Alan Rosenberg; David Marciano
- Country of origin: United States
- Original language: English
- No. of seasons: 2
- No. of episodes: 36

Production
- Executive producers: William M. Finkelstein; Steven Bochco
- Producers: Michael M. Robin; Gregory Hoblit; Ted Mann
- Production companies: Steven Bochco Productions; 20th Century Fox Television

Original release
- Network: ABC
- Release: November 20, 1991 – March 2, 1993

Related
- L.A. Law

Civil Wars is an American legal drama that aired on ABC from November 20, 1991, to March 2, 1993. The series was created and executive produced by William M. Finkelstein and produced by Steven Bochco.

== Synopsis ==
The series focused on the lives and cases of New York City divorce attorneys. In the series, two of New York City's top divorce lawyers, Charlie Howell (Peter Onorati) and Sydney Guilford (Mariel Hemingway), form a partnership despite barely knowing each other, following the mental breakdown of Guilford's stressed-out partner, Eli Levinson (Alan Rosenberg). The show had a famously misanthropic opening credits sequence; in it, romantic photo albums were shown as the voice track played couples ripping into each other in court, as each of the show's principal attorneys interrogated them, one by one, on the stand.

== Cast ==
- Mariel Hemingway as Sydney Guilford
- Peter Onorati as Charlie Howell
- Debi Mazar as Denise Iannello
- Alan Rosenberg as Eli Levinson
- David Marciano as Jeffrey Lassick

Alan Rosenberg and Debi Mazar continued in their roles as Eli Levinson and Denise Iannello after ABC cancelled Civil Wars in 1993. The two characters were moved over to Bochco’s L.A. Law on NBC for its eighth and final season, with Levinson becoming a member of the series’ major law firm and Iannello serving as his secretary.

== Episodes ==
=== Season 1 (1991–92) ===
No. overall	No. in season	Title	Directed by	Written by	Original release date	Prod. code
1	1	"Pilot"	Gregory Hoblit & Michael M. Robin	William M. Finkelstein	November 20, 1991	4101
2	2	"Daveja Vu All Over"	David Rosenbloom	David Milch	November 27, 1991	4105
3	3	"The Pound and the Fury"	Gregory Hoblit	William Finkelstein	December 4, 1991	4102
4	4	"A Long, Fat Frontal Presentation"	Michael M. Robin	Ted Mann	December 11, 1991	4108
5	5	"Have Gun, Will Unravel"	Mark Sobel	Dottie Dartland	December 18, 1991	4104
6	6	"Honi Soit Qui Mal y Pense"	Mark Tinker	Ted Mann	January 8, 1992	4103
7	7	"Oceans White with Phone"	Joan Darling	Ted Mann	January 15, 1992	4106
8	8	"For Better or Perverse"	Mark Tinker	William M. Finkelstein	January 21, 1992	4109
9	9	"Pro Se Can You See"	Mark Tinker	Linda Elstad	January 22, 1992	4111
10	10	"Shop 'til You Drop"	Brad Silberling	Charles H. Eglee & Channing Gibson	January 29, 1992	4110
11	11	"His Honor's Offer"	Bill D'Elia	Ted Mann	February 5, 1992	4112
12	12	"Whippet 'Til It Breaks"	Win Phelps	Linda Elstad	February 12, 1992	4107
13	13	"Tape Fear"	Mark Tinker	William Finkelstein, Channing Gibson & Charles Eglee	March 17, 1992	4113
14	14	"Chute First, Ask Questions Later"	Dan Lerner	George Malko	March 24, 1992	4114
15	15	"Dirty Pool"	Michael M. Robin	William Finkelstein, Charles Eglee, Channing Gibson & Ted Mann	March 31, 1992	4115
16	16	"Mob Psychology"	Joe Ann Fogle	William Finkelstein, Charles Eglee, Channing Gibson & Ted Mann	April 14, 1992	4116
17	17	"Denise and De Nuptials"	Michael Fresco	William Finkelstein, Charles Eglee, Channing Gibson & Ted Mann	April 21, 1992	4117
18	18	"Till Debt Do Us Part"	Mervin B. Dayan	William Finkelstein, Charles Eglee, Channing Gibson & Ted Mann	April 28, 1992	4116

=== Season 2 (1992–93) ===
No. overall	No. in season	Title	Directed by	Written by	Original release date	Prod. code
19	1	"The Naked and the Wed"	Mark Tinker	William M. Finkelstein	September 23, 1992	4205
20	2	"Grin and Bare It"	Charles Haid	David Milch	September 30, 1992	4209
21	3	"Oboe Phobia"	Mark Tinker	Ted Mann	October 7, 1992	4201
22	4	"Drone of Arc"	Michael M. Robin	Ted Mann	October 14, 1992	4202
23	5	"Below the Beltway"	Elodie Keene	Charles Eglee & Channing Gibson	October 21, 1992	4203
24	6	"Devil's Advocate"	Tom Moore	Patricia Nardo and Channing Gibson & Charles Eglee & Ted Mann	October 28, 1992	4204
25	7	"Das Boat House"	Mark Tinker	Charles Eglee & Channing Gibson	November 11, 1992	4207
26	8	"A Bus Named Desire"	Michael Fresco	Story by : Carolyn Shelby & Christopher Ames; Teleplay by : Carolyn Shelby & Christopher Ames and William M. Finkelstein & Charles H. Eglee & Channing Gibson & Ted Mann	December 2, 1992	4208
27	9	"The Old Man and the 'C'"	Michael M. Robin	Lee May	December 9, 1992	4206
28	10	"The Triumph of DeVille"	Dennis Dugan	William M. Finkelstein	December 16, 1992	4210
29	11	"A Partridge in a Pair's Tree"	Dan Lerner	Ted Mann	December 23, 1992	4211
30	12	"Hit the Road, Jack"	Mark Tinker	Channing Gibson & Charles Eglee	January 6, 1993	4212
31	13	"Dances with Sharks"	Mark Tinker	Anne Kenney	January 19, 1993	4213
32	14	"Split Ends"	Michael Fresco	Story by : Steven Bochco; Teleplay by : William M. Finkelstein & Jennifer Flackett	January 26, 1993	4214
33	15	"Watt, Me Worry?"	Dennis Dugan	William M. Finkelstein & Charles Eglee & Channing Gibson	February 9, 1993	4215
34	16	"Alien Aided Affection"	Win Phelps	Ted Mann	February 16, 1993	4216
35	17	"Captain Kangaroo Court"	Joe Ann Fogle	Anne Kenney & Jennifer Flackett	February 23, 1993	4217
36	18	"A Liver Runs Through It"	Mark Tinker	William M. Finkelstein & Charles Eglee & Channing Gibson & Ted Mann	March 2, 1993	4218

== Awards and nominations ==
Year	Award	Category	Recipient	Result
1992	American Society of Cinematographers Award	Outstanding Achievement in Cinematography in Movies of the Week/Pilots	Brian J. Reynolds	Nominated
1992	Casting Society of America's Artios Award	Best Casting for TV, Pilot	Junie Lowry-Johnson	Nominated
1992	Primetime Emmy Award	Outstanding Individual Achievement in Sound Editing for a Series	Dave Weathers, Richard Taylor, Barbara Issak, Frank A. Fuller Jr., Pat McCormick, Gary Lewis, Albert Edmund Lord III, James Hebenstreit (For episode "Oceans White With Phone")	Nominated
1992	Television Critics Association Award	Outstanding Achievement in Drama		Nominated
1993	American Television Awards	Best Supporting Actress, Dramatic Series	Debi Mazar	Nominated
1993	Golden Globe Award	Best Performance by an Actress in a TV-Series - Drama	Mariel Hemingway	Nominated
1993	Viewers for Quality Television Award	Best Supporting Actor in a Quality Drama Series	Alan Rosenberg	Nominated
1993	Young Artist Award	Best Young Actor Guest Starring in a Television Series	Gregor Hesse	Nominated
