= Charles H. Eglee =

American film and television screenwriter and producer

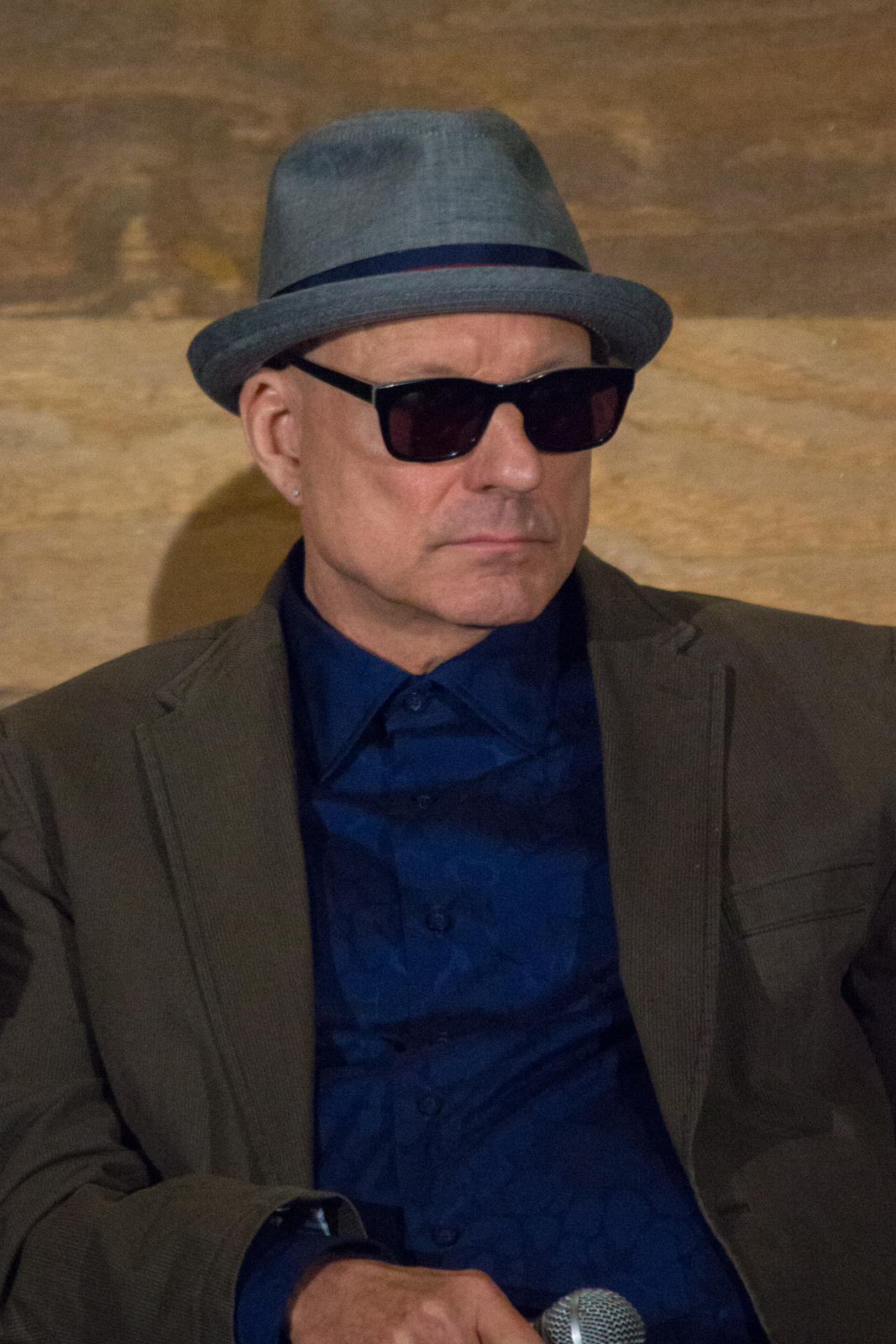
- Eglee at the 2014 ATX TV Festival for Hemlock Grove
- Born: Charles Hamilton Eglee; November 2, 1951 (age 74); Boston, Massachusetts, United States
- Occupation: Television writer
- Writing career
- Pen name: Chic
- Notable works: Dark Angel; Murder One; The Walking Dead

Charles Hamilton Eglee (born November 27, 1951) is an American film and television screenwriter and producer. He worked extensively for Steven Bochco productions throughout the 1990s. For Bochco productions he co-created Byrds of Paradise with frequent collaborator Channing Gibson and co-created Murder One with Gibson and Bochco. Eglee co-created the series Dark Angel with James Cameron.

He was a writer and executive producer on The Shield and Dexter. He served as a member of the production team behind the adaptation of The Walking Dead.

== Biography ==
Eglee was born in Boston, Massachusetts, and grew up in North Haven, Connecticut and Eastham, Massachusetts. He was graduated cum laude from Williston Academy and received his B.A. in English from Yale University. After a brief stint teaching film history at Yale, Eglee moved to California and worked for Roger Corman, where he served in a variety of production capacities and met then production designer James Cameron. With Cameron, Eglee wrote Piranha II: The Spawning. Later, he wrote and produced the mutant rodent film Deadly Eyes.

In 1984, Eglee joined the writing staff of St. Elsewhere as story editor. He went on to become writer and supervising producer of the ABC series Moonlighting. At Twentieth Century Fox Television, Eglee co-wrote and executive-produced the one-hour television pilot, Rockenwagner.

Joining Steven Bochco Productions in 1991, Eglee wrote and co-executive produced the ABC series Civil Wars for two seasons, during which time he also wrote for L.A. Law. In 1993, he co-created and executive-produced the short-lived ABC series, The Byrds of Paradise, starring Timothy Busfield, Seth Green and Jennifer Love Hewitt. After the show's ending, Eglee joined NYPD Blue during its second season, as writer and co-executive producer. In 1995, he co-created Murder One with Steven Bochco and was the show's executive producer. Again with Bochco, Eglee co-created and executive-produced Total Security for ABC starring James Belushi and James Remar.

In 1998, he broke up with Bochco to partner with James Cameron to start a television production company affiliated with Lightstorm Entertainment, Cameron/Eglee Productions. Eglee and James Cameron teamed up again to co-create Dark Angel, a futuristic drama starring Jessica Alba, set in a dystopic world of 21st-century Seattle.

In 2003, Eglee joined the crew of FX police drama The Shield as an executive producer.

In 2007, Eglee joined Showtime drama series Dexter as a writer and executive producer for the third season. He remained a writer and executive producer for the fourth season in 2009.

In 2010, he was a writer and executive producer for the first season of the television adaptation of The Walking Dead, which reunited him with The Walking Dead series creator and showrunner Frank Darabont who had directed an episode of the sixth season of The Shield.

Eglee served as showrunner for the third and final season of American Gods.

== Filmography ==
=== Film ===
Year	Film	Credit	Notes
1978	Piranha	Assistant director	
1981	Piranha II: The Spawning	Written by	As H.A Milton
1982	Deadly Eyes	Written by, co-producer	Co-wrote with Lonon Smith, as Charles Eglee
1989	Far from Home	Special thanks and acknowledgement	
1991	Rockenwagner	Written by, executive producer	TV movie
2008	Get Happy	Special thanks	Short film
2012	Obama: What He's Done	Executive producer	TV movie
2016	While We Were	Special thanks	
2017	Mission Control	Executive producer	TV movie
2019	Terminator: Dark Fate	Story by	Co-wrote story with James Cameron & Josh Friedman and David Goyer & Justin Rhodes

=== Television ===
Production staff

Year	Show	Role	Notes
2014	Hemlock Grove	Executive producer	Season 2
2010	The Walking Dead	Executive producer	Season 1
2009	Dexter	Executive producer	Season 4
2008	Dexter	Executive producer	Season 3
2008	The Shield	Executive producer	Season 7
2007	The Shield	Executive producer	Season 6
2006	The Shield	Executive producer	Season 5
2005	The Shield	Co-executive producer	Season 4
2004	The Shield	Consulting producer	Season 3
2002	Dark Angel	Executive producer	Season 2
2001	Dark Angel	Executive producer	Season 2
2001	Dark Angel	Executive producer	Season 1
2000	Dark Angel	Executive producer	Season 1
1997	Total Security	Executive producer	Season 1
1997	Murder One	Executive producer	Season 2
1996	Murder One	Executive producer	Season 2
1996	Murder One	Executive producer	Season 1
1995	Murder One	Executive producer	Season 1
1995	NYPD Blue	Co-executive producer	Season 2
1994	The Byrds of Paradise	Executive producer	Season 1
1993	Civil Wars	Co-executive producer	Season 2
1992	Civil Wars	Co-executive producer	Season 2
1992	Civil Wars	Co-executive producer	Season 1
1991	Civil Wars	Co-executive producer	Season 1
1989	Moonlighting	Producer	Season 5
1988	Moonlighting	Producer	Season 5
1988	Moonlighting	Producer	Season 4
1987	Moonlighting	Producer	Season 4
1987	Moonlighting	Executive Script Consultant	Season 3
1986	Moonlighting	Executive Script Consultant	Season 3
1986	St. Elsewhere	Story Editor	Season 4
1985	St. Elsewhere	Story Editor	Season 4

Writer

Year	Show	Season	Episode title	Episode	Notes
2010	The Walking Dead	1	"Tell It To The Frogs"	3	Co-written with Jack LoGiudice and Frank Darabont
2009	Dexter	4	"Lost Boys"	10	
2009	Dexter	4	"Remains To Be Seen"	2	
2008	Dexter	3	"I Had A Dream"	11	
2008	Dexter	3	"Si Se Puede"	6	
2008	The Shield	7	"Petty Cash"	11	Co-written with Jameal Turner
2008	The Shield	7	"Bitches Brew"	7	Co-written with Elizabeth A. Hansen
2008	The Shield	7	"Game Face"	5	
2007	The Shield	6	"The Math of the Wrath"	8	
2007	The Shield	6	"Haunts"	5	Co-written with Glen Mazzara
2006	The Shield	5	"Of Mice and Lem"	10	Co-written with Kurt Sutter
2006	The Shield	5	"Rap Payback"	4	Co-written with Ted Griffin
2006	The Shield	5	"Enemy of Good"	2	Co-written with Adam E. Fierro
2005	The Shield	4	"Judas Priest"	12	Story co-written with Sutter, teleplay by Sutter and Scott Rosenbaum
2005	The Shield	4	"String Theory"	9	Co-written with Shawn Ryan
2005	The Shield	4	"Tar Baby"	5	
2004	The Shield	3	"Fire in the Hole"	13	Co-written with Sutter
2004	The Shield	3	"Cracking Ice"	8	Co-written with Diego Gutierrez
2004	The Shield	3	"Posse Up"	6	Co-written with Kim Clements
2004	The Shield	3	"Blood and Water"	2	Co-written with Clements
2003	Karen Sisco	1	"Justice"	4	Story by Eglee, teleplay by Robert Palm
2002	Dark Angel	2	"Freak Nation"	21	Story by Eglee and James Cameron, teleplay by Ira Steven Behr and René Echevarria
2001	Dark Angel	2	"Boo"	5	Co-written with Moira Kirkland
2001	Dark Angel	1	"...and Jesus Brought a Casserole"	20	Co-written with René Echevarria
2001	Dark Angel	1	"The Kidz Are Aiight"	12	Co-written with René Echevarria
2001	Dark Angel	1	"Red"	9	Story co-written with René Echevarria, teleplay by Jose Molina and David Zabel
2000	Dark Angel	1	"Prodigy"	5	Story co-written with René Echevarria, teleplay by Patrick Harbinson
2000	Dark Angel	1	"Flushed"	2	Co-written with René Echevarria
2000	Dark Angel	1	"Pilot"	1	Co-written with James Cameron
1997	Murder One	2	"Chapter Eighteen, Year Two"	18	Story co-written with Steven Bochco, teleplay co-written with Geoffrey Neigher, Nick Harding and Doug Palau
1997	Murder One	2	"Chapter Seventeen, Year Two"	17	Story co-written with Steven Bochco, teleplay by Geoffrey Neigher
1997	Murder One	2	"Chapter Sixteen, Year Two"	16	Story co-written with Steven Bochco, teleplay by Doug Palau
1997	Murder One	2	"Chapter Fifteen, Year Two"	15	Story co-written with Steven Bochco, teleplay co-written with Nick Harding
1997	Murder One	2	"Chapter Fourteen, Year Two"	14	Story co-written with Steven Bochco, teleplay by Geoffrey Neigher and Doug Palau
1997	Murder One	2	"Chapter Thirteen, Year Two"	13	Story co-written with Steven Bochco, teleplay by Doug Palau
1997	Murder One	2	"Chapter Twelve, Year Two"	12	Co-written with William M. Finkelstein
1997	Murder One	2	"Chapter Eleven, Year Two"	11	Teleplay co-written with Geoffrey Neigher and Nick Harding from a story by William M. Finkelstein
1996	Murder One	2	"Chapter Eight, Year Two"	8	Story co-written with Steven Bochco, teleplay by Geoffrey Neigher and Doug Palau
1996	Murder One	2	"Chapter Seven, Year Two"	7	Story co-written with Steven Bochco, teleplay by Geoffrey Neigher and Doug Palau
1996	Murder One	2	"Chapter Six, Year Two"	6	Story co-written with Steven Bochco, teleplay by Doug Palau
1996	Murder One	2	"Chapter Five, Year Two"	5	Story co-written with Steven Bochco, teleplay by Geoffrey Neigher and Nick Harding
1996	Murder One	2	"Chapter Four, Year Two"	4	Story co-written with Steven Bochco, teleplay by Doug Palau
1996	Murder One	2	"Chapter Three, Year Two"	3	Co-written with Nick Harding
1996	Murder One	2	"Chapter One, Year Two"	1	Story co-written with Steven Bochco, teleplay by Geoffrey Neigher and Doug Palau
1996	Murder One	1	"Chapter Twenty-Three"	23	Story co-written with Steven Bochco and William M. Finkelstein, teleplay by Geoffrey Neigher and Doug Palau
1996	Murder One	1	"Chapter Twenty-Two"	22	Teleplay co-written with Charles D. Holland from a story by Steven Bochco and William M. Finkelstein
1996	Murder One	1	"Chapter Twenty-One"	21	Story co-written with Steven Bochco, teleplay by Ann Donahue and William M. Finkelstein
1996	Murder One	1	"Chapter Twenty"	20	Story co-written with Steven Bochco, teleplay by Geoffrey Neigher and Doug Palau
1996	Murder One	1	"Chapter Nineteen"	19	Teleplay co-written with William M. Finkelstein from a story by Steven Bochco and Finkelstein
1996	Murder One	1	"Chapter Seventeen"	17	Story, teleplay by Ann Donahue and Charles Holland
1996	Murder One	1	"Chapter Sixteen"	16	Story co-written with William M. Finkelstein, teleplay by Geoffrey Neigher and Doug Palau
1996	Murder One	1	"Chapter Fifteen"	15	Teleplay co-written with William M. Finkelstein from a story by Steven Bochco
1996	Murder One	1	"Chapter Fourteen"	14	Story co-written with William M. Finkelstein, teleplay by Ann Donahue and Charles Holland
1996	Murder One	1	"Chapter Twelve"	12	Co-written with William M. Finkelstein
1995	Murder One	1	"Chapter Eight"	8	Story co-written with William M. Finkelstein, teleplay by Ann Donahue, Geoffrey Neigher and Charles Holland
1995	Murder One	1	"Chapter Two"	2	Teleplay by Eglee from a story co-written with Steven Bochco
1995	Murder One	1	"Chapter One"	1	Teleplay co-written with Steven Bochco, Channing Gibson and David Milch from a story co-written with Bochco and Gibson
1995	NYPD Blue	2	"Don We Now Our Gay Apparel"	9	Co-written with Channing Gibson
1994	NYPD Blue	2	"The Final Adjustment"	6	Teleplay co-written with Channing Gibson and Ted Mann from a story by Christopher McQuarrie
1994	NYPD Blue	2	"Cop Suey"	3	Co-written with Channing Gibson
1994	Byrds of Paradise	1	"He Hawai'i Kakou I Ka Pu'uwai"	12	Co-written with Channing Gibson
1994	Byrds of Paradise	1	"Kimo the Magnificent"	10	Co-written with Channing Gibson
1994	Byrds of Paradise	1	"Back in the Saddle"	9	Story co-written with Channing Gibson, teleplay by Nick Harding
1994	Byrds of Paradise	1	"The Bottle Show"	8	Co-written with Channing Gibson
1994	Byrds of Paradise	1	"Mi Casa es Tsunami"	7	Story co-written with Channing Gibson and Nick Harding, teleplay by Jon Harmon Feldman
1994	Byrds of Paradise	1	"Moon, Man"	3	Co-written with Channing Gibson
1994	Byrds of Paradise	1	"Pilot"	1	Co-written with Channing Gibson
1992	L.A. Law	6	"Say Goodnight Gracie"	22	Co-written with Channing Gibson and Alan Brennert
1992	L.A. Law	6	"Beauty and the Breast"	20	Co-written with Channing Gibson, Carol Flint and Paul Manning
1989	Moonlighting	5	"When Girls Collide"	10	Story co-written with Merrill Markoe, teleplay by Markoe
1988	Moonlighting	5	"A Womb with a View"	1	Co-written with Glenn Gordon Caron
1988	Moonlighting	3	"Here's Living with You, Kid"	13	Story co-written with Roger Director and Kerry Ehrin, teleplay by Jeff Reno and Ron Osborn
1988	Moonlighting	3	"Maddie Hayes Got Married"	12	Co-written with Roger Director
1988	Moonlighting	3	"Fetal Attraction"	9	Teleplay co-written with Roger Director from a story by Ron Osborn, Jeff Reno and Kerry Ehrin
1986	Moonlighting	3	"All Creatures Great... and Not So Great"	5	Teleplay by Eglee from a story co-written with Eric Blakeney and Gene Miller
1986	St. Elsewhere	4	"The Equalizer"	23	Co-written with Channing Gibson, John Masius, John Tinker and Tom Fontana
1986	St. Elsewhere	4	"Black's Magic"	22	Co-written with Channing Gibson, John Masius, John Tinker and Tom Fontana
1986	St. Elsewhere	4	"Time Heals: Part 2"	18	Co-written with John Masius and John Tinker
1986	St. Elsewhere	4	"Time Heals: Part 1"	17	Co-written with John Masius and John Tinker
1985	St. Elsewhere	4	"Santa Claus Is Dead"	11	Co-written with Tom Fontana and John Masius
1985	St. Elsewhere	4	"Watch The Skies"	8	Teleplay by Eglee from a story by Tom Fontana and John Masius
1985	St. Elsewhere	4	"Haunted"	3	Teleplay co-written with Channing Gibson and John Tinker from a story by Tom Fontana and John Masius
1985	St. Elsewhere	3	"Tears of a Clown"	22	Story co-written with Channing Gibson, Steve Bello and John Tinker, teleplay by Tom Fontana and John Masius
1985	St. Elsewhere	3	"Amazing Face"	20	Teleplay by Eglee from a story by Tom Fontana and John Masius
1985	St. Elsewhere	3	"Red, White, Black and Blue"	19	Teleplay co-written with Steve Bello from a story by Channing Gibson and John Tinker
1984	St. Elsewhere	3	"The Children's Hour"	12	Teleplay co-written with Steve Bello from a story by Channing Gibson and John Tinker
1984	St. Elsewhere	3	"Homecoming"	11	Teleplay co-written with Mark Tinker from a story by Channing Gibson and Steve Bello
1984	St. Elsewhere	3	"Girls Just Want to Have Fun"	10	Story co-written with Steve Bello, teleplay by Channing Gibson and John Tinker
1984	St. Elsewhere	3	"Up On The Roof"	9	Story co-written with John Masius, teleplay by Channing Gibson and Steve Bello
1984	St. Elsewhere	3	"My Aim Is True"	6	Teleplay co-written with Channing Gibson from a story by Tom Fontana and John Masius
1984	St. Elsewhere	2	"Equinox"	18	Teleplay co-written with Channing Gibson from a story by Tom Fontana and John Masius

== Awards ==
- 1995: Emmy Award - Outstanding Drama Series for NYPD Blue
- 1997: BAFTA - Best Foreign Drama for Murder One
- 2001: People's Choice Award - Favorite New Drama Series for Dark Angel
- 2004: AFI - TV Program of the Year for The Shield
- 2006: Peabody Award for The Shield
- 2008: AFI - TV Program of the Year for The Shield
