= Edgar Allan Poe Award for Best Episode in a TV Series =

American television award

The Edgar Allan Poe Award for Best Episode in a TV Series was established in 1952 as a category of the Edgar Awards. The Edgar Allan Poe Award for Best Episode in a TV Series winners are listed below.

== Recipients ==
=== 1950s ===
Year	Episode	Series	Writers	Result	Ref.
1952	—	The Web	Franklin Heller	Winner	
1953	—	Dragnet	Jack Webb	Winner	
1954	"Crime at Blossoms"	Studio One	Jerome Ross	Winner	
1955	"Smoke"	Suspense	Gore Vidal	Winner	
1955	"The Long Goodbye"	Climax!	E. Jack Neuman, based on the novel by Raymond Chandler	Shortlist	
1956	"Sting of Death"	The Elgin Hour	Alvin Sapinsley Jr., based on the novel A Taste for Honey by H. F. Heard	Winner	
1956	"Thin Air"	Climax!	Ben Starr	Shortlist	
1957	"The Fine Art of Murder"	Omnibus	Sidney Carroll	Winner	
1958	"Mechanical Manhunt"	The Alcoa Hour	Harold Swanton	Winner	
1958	"The Trial of Lizzie Borden"	Omnibus	Omnibus staff	Shortlist	
1959	"The Edge of Truth"	Studio One	Adrian Spies	Winner	
1959	"Capital Punishment"	Omnibus	James Lee	Winner	

=== 1960s ===
Year	Episode	Series	Writers	Result	Ref.
1960	"The Empty Chair"	The Untouchables	David Karp	Winner	
1960	"The Comic"	Peter Gunn	Blake Edwards	Shortlist	
1961	"The Case of the Burning Court"	Dow Hour of Great Mysteries	Kelley Roos (Audrey Roos and William Roos)	Winner	
1961	"The Day of the Bullet"	Alfred Hitchcock Presents	Bill S. Ballinger	Shortlist	
1962	"Witness in the Dark"	Kraft Mystery Theater	John Lemont and Leigh Vance	Winner	
1962	"The Legend of Jim Riva"	The Defenders	John K. Butler and Boyd Correll	Shortlist	
1963	"The Problem of Cell 13"	Kraft Mystery Theatre	A. A. Roberts	Winner	
1963	"The Apostle"	The Defenders	Stanley R. Greenberg	Shortlist	
1963	"Scene of the Crime"	The United States Steel Hour	Sidney Carroll	Shortlist	
1964	"The End of the World Baby"	Kraft Suspense Hour	Luther Davis	Winner	
1964	—	The Defenders		Shortlist	
1964	"To Bury Caesar"	The DuPont Show of the Week	Berkely Mather	Shortlist	
1965	—	The Fugitive	Alan Armer	Winner	
1966	"An Unlocked Window"	Alfred Hitchcock Hour	James Bridges	Winner	
1966	"Carry Me Back to Old Tsing Tao"	I, Spy	David Karp	Shortlist	
1966	"The Gray Lady"	Honey West	Richard Levinson and William Link	Shortlist	
1966	"Memorandum for a Spy"	Bob Hope Presents the Chrysler Theatre	Robert L. Joseph	Shortlist	
1967	"Operation Rogesh"	Mission: Impossible	Jerome Ross	Winner	
1967	"After the Lion, Jackals"	Bob Hope Presents the Chrysler Theatre	Stanford Whitmore	Shortlist	
1967	"The Fatal Mistake"	Bob Hope Presents the Chrysler Theatre	Jacques Gillies and Oscar Millard	Shortlist	
1968	"Tempest in a Texas Town"	Judd, for the Defense	Harold Gast and Leon Tokatyan	Winner	
1969	"The Strange Case of Dr. Jekll and Mr. Hyde"	ABC Special	Ian McLellan Hunter	Winner	
1969	"Companions in Nightmare"	NBC World Premier Film	Robert L. Joseph	Shortlist	

=== 1970s ===
Year	Episode	Series	Writers	Result	Ref.
1970	"Daughter of the Mind"	ABC Movie of the Week	Luther Davis	Winner	
1970	"In This Corner - Sol Albert"	The Mod Squad	Harve Bennett and Rita Lakin	Shortlist	
1970	"The Sound of Darkness"	Mannix	Barry Trivers	Shortlist	
1970	—	Night Gallery	Rod Serling	Shortlist	
1971	"Berlin Affair"	NBC Movie of the Week	E. Jack Neuman and Richard Alan Simmons	Winner	
1971	The Other Man	NBC Movie of the Week	Eric Bercovici and Michael Blankfort	Shortlist	
1971	The Old Man Who Cried Wolf	ABC Movie of the Week	Luther Davis	Shortlist	
1971	"To Taste of Death But Once"	The Bold Ones: The Senator	Joel Oliansky	Shortlist	
1971	"The Mouse That Died"	Mannix	Chester Krumholtz	Shortlist	
1972	"A Step in Time"	Mannix	Mann Rubin	Winner	
1972	"Company Town"	Cade's County	Cliff Gould	Shortlist	
1972	"Murder by the Book"	Columbo	Steven Bochco	Shortlist	
1972	"Somebody's Out To Get Jennie"	McCloud	Robert Presnell Jr.	Shortlist	
1973	"The New Mexico Connection"	McCloud	Glen A. Larson	Winner	
1973	"A Date with Death"	Banyon	Morton Fine, Milton S. Gelman	Shortlist	
1973	"Bait Once, Bait Twice"	Hawaii Five-O	Will Lorin	Shortlist	
1973	"The Crimson Halo"	Mannix	Shimon Wincelberg	Shortlist	
1973	"Victim in Shadow"	Owen Marshall, Counselor at Law	Richard Bluel	Shortlist	
1974	"Requiem for an Informer"	Police Story	Sy Salkowitz	Winner	
1974	"Here Today, Gone Tonight"	Hawaii Five-O	Jerome Coopersmith	Shortlist	
1974	"One For the Morgue"	Kojak	Jerrold Freedman	Shortlist	
1974	"Requiem for a Falling Star"	Columbo	Jackson Gillis	Shortlist	
1974	"The Cain Connection"	Toma	Stephen J. Cannell	Shortlist	
1975	"Requiem For C.Z. Smith"	Police Story	Robert L. Collins	Winner	
1975	"Anatomy of Two Rapes"	Police Woman	Richard Bluel, Pat Fielder	Shortlist	
1975	"Gertrude"	Harry O	Howard Rodman	Shortlist	
1976	"No Immunity for Murder"	Kojak	Joe Gores	Winner	
1976	"Murder Comes in Little Pills"	Kate McShane	Robert Foster, Milt Rosen	Shortlist	
1976	"The Mark of Cain"	Petrocelli	Leonard Katzman	Shortlist	
1977	"Requiem for Murder"	The Streets of San Francisco	James Johnson Sweeney	Winner	
1977	"Dear Tony"	Baretta	Norman Hudis	Shortlist	
1977	"The Oracle Wore a Cashmere Suit"	The Rockford Files	David Chase	Shortlist	
1978	"The Thighbone Is Connected To The Knee Bone"	Quincy M.E.	Tony Lawrence and Lou Shaw	Winner	
1978	"In the Event of My Death"	The Andros Targets	Jerome Coopersmith	Shortlist	
1978	"The Deadly Maze"	The Rockford Files	Juanita Bartlett	Shortlist	
1979	"Murder Under Glass"	Columbo	Robert van Scoyk	Winner	
1979	"Murder on the Flip Side"	The Eddie Capra Mysteries	Lee Sheldon	Shortlist	
1979		Vegas	Michael Mann	Shortlist	

=== 1980s ===
Year	Episode	Series	Writers	Result	Ref.
1980	"Skin"	Tales of the Unexpected	Robin Chapman and Roald Dahl	Winner	
1980	"A Hollywood Whodunit"	Lou Grant	Michelle Gallery	Shortlist	
1980	"Only the Pretty Girls Die"	Eischield	Mark Rodgers	Shortlist	
1980	"Stone"	Stone	Stephen J. Cannell	Shortlist	
1981	"China Doll"	Magnum, P.I.	Donald P. Bellisario and Glen A. Larson	Winner	
1981	"A Matter of Principle"	Quincy, M.E.	Steven Greenberg, Aubrey Solomon	Shortlist	
1981	"Tenspeed and Brown Shoe"	Tenspeed and Brown Shoe	Stephen J. Cannell	Shortlist	
1982	"Hill Street Station"	Hill Street Blues	Steven Bochco and Michael Kozoll	Winner	
1982	"Simon Eyes"	Simon & Simon	Philip DeGuere	Shortlist	
1982	"Stain of Guilt"	Quincy, M.E.	Sam Egan	Shortlist	
1983	"In the Steele of the Night"	Remington Steele	Joel Steiger	Winner	
1983	"Ashes to Ashes, None Too Soon"	Simon & Simon	Bob Shayne	Shortlist	
1983	"Matt Houston"	Matt Houston	Richard Christian Danus, Ken Trevey	Shortlist	
1984	"The Pencil"	Philip Marlowe, Private Eye	Jo Eisinger	Winner	
1984	"Altered Steele"	Remington Steele	Jeff Melvoin	Shortlist	
1984	"Grand Illusion"	Simon & Simon	E. Jack Kaplan	Shortlist	
1985	"Deadly Lady"	Murder, She Wrote	Peter S. Fischer	Winner	
1985	"Miami Vice"	Miami Vice	Anthony Yerkovich	Shortlist	
1985	"Seven Dead Eyes"	Mickey Spillane's Mike Hammer	Joe Gores	Shortlist	
1986	"The Amazing Falsworth"	Amazing Stories	Mick Garris	Winner	
1986	"The Dream Sequence Always Rings Twice"	Moonlighting	Debra Frank, Carl Sautter	Shortlist	
1986	"Wake Me When I'm Dead"	Alfred Hitchcock Presents	Buck Henry	Shortlist	
1987	"The Cup"	The Equalizer	David Jackson, Andrew Sipes	Winner	
1987	"Deirdre"	The New Mike Hammer	Herman Miller	Shortlist	
1987	"Diary of a Perfect Murder"	Matlock	Dean Hargrove	Shortlist	
1987	"Wax Poetic"	Blacke's Magic	Lee Sheldon	Shortlist	
1988	"The Musgrave Ritual"	Masterpiece Mystery	Jeremy Paul	Winner	
1988	"Blue Movie"	Private Eye	Ron Hansen	Shortlist	
1988	"Nicky the Rose"	Private Eye	John Leekley, Alfonse Ruggiero Jr.	Shortlist	
1988	"The Marriage of Heaven and Hell"	Wiseguy	Eric Blakeney	Shortlist	
1988	"The Right to Remain Silent"	Cagney & Lacey	David Abramowitz	Shortlist	
1989	"The Devil's Foot"	Masterpiece Mystery	Gary Hopkins	Winner	
1989	"Date with an Angel"	Wiseguy	David J. Burke, Stephen Kronish	Shortlist	
1989	"May the Road Rise Up"	Simon & Simon	Richard C. Okie	Shortlist	
1989	"Rumpole and the Bright Seraphim"	Rumpole of the Bailey	John Mortimer	Shortlist	
1989	"The Black Tower, Episode 1"	The Black Tower	William Humble	Shortlist	

=== 1990s ===
Year	Episode	Series	Writers	Result	Ref.
1990	"White Noise"	Wiseguy	David J. Burke and Alfonse Ruggiero	Winner	
1990	"Blues for Buder"	B. L. Stryker	Robert B. Parker, Joan Parker	Shortlist	
1990	"Investment in Death"	Hunter	Nick Gore, Jerry Jacobius	Shortlist	
1990	"Rumpole and the Bubble Reputation"	Rumpole of the Bailey	John Mortimer	Shortlist	
1990	"Urine Trouble Now"	L.A. Law	William M. Finkelstein, Michelle Gallery, David E. Kelley, Judith Parker	Shortlist	
1991	"Good Night, Dear Heart"	Quantum Leap	Paul Brown	Winner	
1991	"Gabriel's Fire"	Gabriel's Fire	Coleman Luck, Jacqueline Zambrano	Shortlist	
1991	"Happily Ever After"	Law & Order	David Black, Robert Stuart Nathan	Shortlist	
1991	"Justice Swerved"	L.A. Law	David E. Kelley, Bryce Zabel	Shortlist	
1992	"Sonata for Solo Organ"	Law & Order	Michael S. Chernuchin, Joe Morgenstern	Shortlist	
1992	"Poirot: The Lost Mine"	Agatha Christie's Poirot	Michael Baker, David Renwick	Shortlist	
1992	"Shoscombe Old Place"	Sherlock Holmes	Gary Hopkins	Shortlist	
1992	"The Problem of Thor Bridge"	Sherlock Holmes	Jeremy Paul	Shortlist	
1993	"Conspiracy"	Law & Order	Rene Balcer, Michael S. Chernuchin	Winner	
1993	"A Killer Book"	Likely Suspects	Paul Bernbaum	Shortlist	
1993	"Point of View"	Law & Order	Rene Balcer, Walon Green	Shortlist	
1993	"Smells Like Teen Spirit"	Likely Suspects	Lee Goldberg, William Rabkin	Shortlist	
1993	"The Dead File"	Murder, She Wrote	Tom B. Sawyer	Shortlist	
1994	"4B or Not 4B"	NYPD Blue	David Milch	Winner	
1994	"Conduct Unbecoming"	Law & Order	Rene Balcer, Michael S. Chernuchin	Shortlist	
1994	"Promised Land"	Inspector Morse	Julian Mitchell	Shortlist	
1994	"Rising Sun"	The Commish	Stephen Kronish	Shortlist	
1994	"Turpitude"	Picket Fences	David E. Kelley	Shortlist	
1995	"Simone Says"	NYPD Blue	Steven Bochco, Walon Green, David Milch	Winner	
1995	"Family Values"	Law & Order	Rene Balcer, William N. Fordes	Shortlist	
1995	"Pilot"	Under Suspicion	Jacqueline Zambrano	Shortlist	
1995	"The Erlenmeyer Flask"	The X-Files	Chris Carter	Shortlist	
1996	"Torah! Torah! Torah!"	NYPD Blue	Theresa Rebeck	Winner	
1996	"Humbug"	The X-Files	Darin Morgan	Shortlist	
1996	"Rumpole and the Family Pride"	Rumpole of the Bailey	John Mortimer	Shortlist	
1996	"The Eligible Bachelor"	Sherlock Holmes	T.R. Bowen	Shortlist	
1996	"The Lost Child"	Prime Suspect	Paul Billing	Shortlist	
1997	"Deadbeat"	Law & Order	I.C. Rapoport, Ed Zuckerman	Winner	
1997	"Causa Mortis"	Law & Order	Rene Balcer	Shortlist	
1997	"Every Picture Tells a Story"	EZ Streets	Paul Haggis	Shortlist	
1997	"I.D."	Law & Order	Ed Zuckerman	Shortlist	
1997	"Slave"	Law & Order	Rene Balcer, Elaine Loeser	Shortlist	
1998	"Double Down"	Law & Order	Richard Sweren, Simon Wincelberg, Ed Zuckerman	Winner	
1998	"Blood"	Law & Order	Rene Balcer, Craig Tepper	Shortlist	
1998	"Burned"	Law & Order	Siobhan Byrne	Shortlist	
1998	"First Degree"	The Practice	Stephen Gaghan, David E. Kelley, Michael R. Perry	Shortlist	
1998	"Thrill"	Law & Order	Rene Balcer	Shortlist	
1999	"Bad Girl"	Law & Order	Rene Balcer, Richard Sweren	Winner	
1999	"Carrier"	Law & Order	David Black	Shortlist	
1999	"Fallen Idol"	Silent Witness	Gwyneth Hughes	Shortlist	
1999	"Fools Russian"	Brooklyn South	Allen Edwards, Matt Olmstead, Scott A. Williams	Shortlist	
1999	"Skel in a Cell"	Brooklyn South	Steven Bochco, William M. Finkelstein, Bill Clark, David Milch (Story), Doug Palau, Nicholas Wootton (Teleplay)	Shortlist	

=== 2000s ===
Year	Episode	Series	Writers	Result	Ref.
2000	"Refuge, Part 2"	Law & Order	Rene Balcer	Winner	
2000	"Empire"	Law & Order	Rene Balcer (story), Robert Palm (teleplay/story)	Shortlist	
2000	"Hate"	Law & Order	Rene Balcer	Shortlist	
2000	"Killerz"	Law & Order	Richard Sweren	Shortlist	
2000	"Merger"	Law & Order	Lynn Mamet	Shortlist	
2001	"Limitations"	Law & Order: SVU	Michael R. Perry	Winner	
2001	"Black, White & Blue"	Law & Order	Lynne Litt, Richard Sweren, Matt Witten	Shortlist	
2001	"Endurance"	Law & Order	Matt Witten	Shortlist	
2001	"Remorse	Law & Order: SVU	Michael R. Perry	Shortlist	
2002	"Pine Barrens"	The Sopranos	Tim Van Patten, Terence Winter	Winner	
2002	"Countdown"	Law & Order: SVU	Dawn Denoon, Lisa Marie Petersen	Shortlist	
2002	"Johnny Got His Gold"	NYPD Blue	Steven Bochco, Bill Clark, Nicholas Wootton	Shortlist	
2002	"Killing Time"	The Practice	Peter Blake, David E. Kelley, Lukas Reiter, Jonathan Shapiro	Shortlist	
2002	"Prisoner's Base Part 2	Nero Wolfe	Lee Goldberg, William Rabkin	Shortlist	
2003	"Waste"	Law & Order: SVU	Dawn DeNoon and Lisa Marie Petersen	Winner	
2003	"Ho Down"	NYPD Blue	Nicholas Wootton and Bill Clark	Shortlist	
2003	"Mr. Monk Takes A Vacation"	Monk	Hy Conrad	Shortlist	
2003	"The Target"	The Wire	David Simon (teleplay/story), Ed Burns (story)	Shortlist	
2003	"Tuxedo Hill"	Law & Order: Criminal Intent	René Balcer	Shortlist	
2004	"Goodbye"	The Practice	Peter Blake and David E. Kelley	Winner	
2004	"Coerced"	Law & Order: SVU	Jonathan Greene	Shortlist	
2004	"Mr. Monk and the 12th Man"	Monk	Michael Angeli	Shortlist	
2004	"Mr. Monk and the Very, Very Old Man"	Monk	Daniel Dratch	Shortlist	
2004	"Probability"	Law & Order: Criminal Intent	Gerry Conway and René Balcer (story)	Shortlist	
2005	"Want"	Law & Order: Criminal Intent	Elizabeth Benjamin (teleplay/story) and René Balcer (story)	Winner	
2005	"Consumed"	Law & Order: Criminal Intent	Warren Leight (teleplay/story), René Balcer (story)	Shortlist	
2005	"Conscience"	Law & Order: Criminal Intent	Gerry Conway (teleplay/story) and René Balcer (story)	Shortlist	
2005	"Mr. Monk and the Girl Who Cried Wolf"	Monk	Hy Conrad	Shortlist	
2005	"Pas De Deux"	Law & Order: Criminal Intent	Warren Leight (teleplay/story) and René Balcer (story)	Shortlist	
2006	"Amulet"	Sea of Souls	Ed Whitmore	Winner	
2006	"911"	Law & Order: SVU	Patrick Harbinson	Shortlist	
2006	"A Bullet Runs Through It, Parts 1 and 2"	CSI	Richard Catalani and Carol Mendelsohn	Shortlist	
2006	"Grave Danger"	CSI	Carol Mendelsohn, Naren Shankar, Quentin Tarantino, and Anthony Zuiker	Shortlist	
2006	"Redemption"	Wire in the Blood	Guy Burt	Shortlist	
2007	"Episode 1"	Life on Mars	Matthew Graham	Winner	
2007	"Blue Blood"	The Closer	James Duff and Mike Berchem	Shortlist	
2007	"Clueless"	House	Thomas L. Moran	Shortlist	
2007	"Crocodile"	Dexter	Clyde Phillips	Shortlist	
2007	"Mr. Monk Gets a New Shrink"	Monk	Hy Conrad	Shortlist	
2008	"Pilot"	Burn Notice	Matt Nix	Winner	
2008	"It's Alive!"	Dexter	Daniel Cerone	Shortlist	
2008	"Pie-lette"	Pushing Daisies	Bryan Fuller	Shortlist	
2008	"Senseless"	Law & Order: Criminal Intent	Warren Leight, Siobhan Byrne O'Connor, and Julie Martin	Shortlist	
2008	"Yahrzeit"	Waking the Dead	Declan Croghan	Shortlist	
2009	"Prayer of the Bone"	Wire in the Blood	Patrick Harbinson	Winner	
2009	"Burn Card"	Law & Order	Ed Zuckerman and David Wilcox	Shortlist	
2009	"Signature"	Law & Order: SVU	Judith McCreary	Shortlist	
2009	"Streetwise"	Law & Order: SVU	Paul Grellong	Shortlist	
2009	"You May Now Kill the Bride"	CSI: Miami	Barry O'Brien	Shortlist	

=== 2010s ===
Year	Episode	Series	Writers	Result	Ref.
2010	"Place of Execution"	Place of Execution	Patrick Harbinson	Winner	
2010	"Grilled"	Breaking Bad	George Mastras	Shortlist	
2010	"Living the Dream"	Dexter	Clyde Phillips	Shortlist	
2010	"Look What He Dug Up This Time"	Damages	Todd A. Kessler, Glenn Kessler, Daniel Zelman	Shortlist	
2010	"Strike Three	The Closer	Steven Kane	Shortlist	
2011	"Episode 1"	Luther	Neil Cross	Winner	
2011	"Episode 4"	Luther	Neil Cross	Shortlist	
2011	"Full Measure"	Breaking Bad	Vince Gilligan	Shortlist	
2011	"No Mas"	Breaking Bad	Vince Gilligan	Shortlist	
2011	"The Next Ones Gonna Go in Your Throat"	Damages	Todd A. Kessler, Glenn Kessler, and Daniel Zelman	Shortlist	
2012	"Pilot"	Homeland	Alex Gansa, Howard Gordon, and Gideon Raff	Winner	
2012	"Innocence"	Blue Bloods	Siobhan Byrne O'Connor	Shortlist	
2012	"The Life Inside"	Justified	Benjamin Cavell	Shortlist	
2012	"Part 1"	Whitechapel	Ben Court and Caroline Ip	Shortlist	
2012	"Mask"	Law & Order: SVU	Speed Weed	Shortlist	
2013	"A Scandal in Belgravia"	Sherlock	Steven Moffat	Winner	
2013	"Child Predator"	Elementary	Peter Blake	Shortlist	
2013	"New Car Smell"	Homeland	Meredith Stiehm	Shortlist	
2013	"Pilot"	Longmire	Hunt Baldwin, John Coveny	Shortlist	
2013	"Slaughterhouse"	Justified	Fred Golan	Shortlist	
2014	"Episode 1"	The Fall	Allan Cubitt	Winner	
2014	"Episode 3"	Luther	Neil Cross	Shortlist	
2014	"Legitimate Rape"	Law & Order: SVU	Kevin Fox and Peter Blauner	Shortlist	
2014	"Variations Under Domestication"	Orphan Black	Will Pascoe	Shortlist	
2014	"Pilot"	The Following	Kevin Williamson	Shortlist	
2015	"Episode 1"	Happy Valley	Sally Wainwright	Winner	
2015	"The Empty Hearse"	Sherlock	Mark Gatiss	Shortlist	
2015	"Unfinished Business"	Blue Bloods	Siobhan Byrne O'Connor	Shortlist	
2015	"Dream Baby Dream"	The Killing	Sean Whitesell	Shortlist	
2015	"Episode 6"	The Game	Toby Whithouse	Shortlist	
2016	"Gently with the Women"	Inspector George Gently	Peter Flannery	Winner	
2016	"Episode 7"	Broadchurch	Chris Chibnall	Shortlist	
2016	"Elise: The Final Mystery"	Foyle's War	Anthony Horowitz	Shortlist	
2016	"Terra Incognita"	Person of Interest	Erik Mountain & Melissa Scrivner Love	Shortlist	
2016	"The Beating of Her Wings"	Ripper Street	Toby Finlay	Shortlist	
2017	"A Blade of Grass"	Penny Dreadful	John Logan	Winner	
2017	"Episode 1, From the Ashes of Tragedy"	The People v. O. J. Simpson: American Crime Story	Scott Alexander and Larry Karaszewski	Shortlist	
2017	"The Abominable Bride"	Sherlock	Mark Gatiss and Steven Moffat	Shortlist	
2017	"Dark Road	Vera	Martha Hillier	Shortlist	
2017	"return 0"	Person of Interest	Jonathan Nolan and Denise Thé	Shortlist	
2017	"The Bicameral Mind"	Westworld	Jonathan Nolan and Lisa Joy	Shortlist	
2018	"Somebody to Love"	Fargo	Noah Hawley	Winner	
2018	"Episode 1"	The Loch	Stephen Brady	Shortlist	
2018	"Something Happened"	Law & Order: SVU	Michael Chernuchin	Shortlist	
2018	"Gentley and the New Age"	George Gentley	Robert Murphy	Shortlist	
2018	"The Blanket Mire"	Vera	Paul Matthew Thompson and Martha Hillier	Shortlist	
2019	"The One That Holds Everything"	The Romanoffs	Matthew Weiner and Donald Joh	Winner	
2019	"My Aim is True"	Blue Bloods	Kevin Wade	Shortlist	
2019	"Episode 1"	Mystery Road	Michaeley O'Brien	Shortlist	
2019	"Season 2, Episode 1"	Jack Irish	Andrew Knight	Shortlist	
2019	"The Box"	Brooklyn Nine-Nine	Luke Del Tredici	Shortlist	

=== 2020s ===
Year	Episode	Series	Writers	Result	Ref.
2020	"Season 5, Episode 4"	Line of Duty	Jed Mercurio	Winner	
2020	"Episode 1"	Dublin Murders	Sarah Phelps	Shortlist	
2020	"Episode 1"	Manhunt	Ed Whitmore	Shortlist	
2020	"Episode 1"	Wisting	Kathrine Valen Zeiner, Trygve Allister Diesen	Shortlist	
2021	"Episode 1, Photochemistry"	Dead Still	John Morton	Winner	
2021	"Episode 1, The Stranger"	The Stranger	Danny Brocklehurst	Shortlist	
2021	"Episode 1, Open Water"	The Sounds	Sarah-Kate Lynch	Shortlist	
2021	"Episode 1"	Des	Luke Neal	Shortlist	
2021	"What I Know"	The Boys	Rebecca Sonnenshine	Shortlist	
2022	"Boots on the Ground"	Narcos: Mexico	Iturri Sosa	Winner	
2022	"Happy Families"	Midsomer Murders	Nicholas Hicks-Beach	Shortlist	
2022	"We Men Are Wretched Things"	The North Water	Andrew Haigh	Shortlist	
2022	"Episode 1"	The Beast Must Die	Gaby Chiappe	Shortlist	
2022	"Dog Day Morning"	The Brokenwood Mysteries	Tim Balme & Nic Sampson	Shortlist	
2023	"Episode 1"	Magpie Murders	Anthony Horowitz	Winner	
2023	"One Mighty and Strong"	Under the Banner of Heaven	Brandon Boyce	Shortlist	
2023	"Episode 1'	Karen Pirie	Emer Kenny	Shortlist	
2023	"When Harry Met Fergus"	Harry Wild	David Logan	Shortlist	
2023	"The Reagan Way"	Blue Bloods	Siobhan Bryne O'Connor	Shortlist	
2023	"Eighteen Wheels A Predator"	Law & Order: SVU	Brianna Yellen, Kathy Dobie & Monet Hurst-Mendoza	Shortlist	
2024	"Escape from Shit Mountain"	Poker Face	Nora Zuckerman and Lilla Zuckerman	Winner	
2024	"Time of the Monkey"	Poker Face	Wyatt Cain and Charlie Peppers	Shortlist	
2024	"I'm a Pretty Observant Guy"	Will Trent	Liz Heldens	Shortlist	
2024	"Dead Man's Hand"	Poker Face	Rian Johnson	Shortlist	
2024	"Hózhó Náhásdlii (Beauty is Restore)"	Dark Winds	Graham Roland and John Wirth	Shortlist	
2025	"Episode One"	Monsieur Spade	Tom Fontana & Scott Frank	Winner	
2025	"Episode Five"	Rebus	Gregory Burke	Shortlist	
2025	"Episode One"	Moonflower Murders	Anthony Horowitz	Shortlist	
2025	"Mirror"	Murderesses	Wiktor Piatkowski, Joanna Kozlowska, Katarzyna Kaczmarek	Shortlist	
2025	"Episode Two"	The Marlow Murder Club	Robert Thorogood	Shortlist	
2026	"Pilot"	Paradise	Dan Fogelman	Winner	
2026	"End of the Line"	Ballard	Michael Alaimo and Kendall Sherwood	Shortlist	
2026	"Episode 101"	The Lowdown	Sterlin Harjo	Shortlist	
2026	"These Girls"	Long Bright River	Nikki Toscano and Liz Moore	Shortlist	
2026	"Ye'iitsoh (Big Monster)"	Dark Winds	John Wirth and Steven Paul Judd	Shortlist	
