= Murder One (TV series) =

American legal drama television series

- The major cast of Murder One (season 1)
- Genre: Legal drama
- Created by: Steven Bochco; Charles H. Eglee; Channing Gibson
- Starring: Daniel Benzali; Anthony LaPaglia; Stanley Tucci; Barbara Bosson; Michael Hayden; Mary McCormack; J. C. MacKenzie
- Composer: Mike Post
- Country of origin: United States
- Original language: English
- No. of seasons: 2
- No. of episodes: 41

Production
- Executive producers: Steven Bochco; Charles H. Eglee; Michael Fresco
- Producers: Marc Buckland; William M. Finkelstein
- Running time: 45–48 minutes
- Production companies: Steven Bochco Productions; 20th Century Fox Television

Original release
- Network: ABC
- Release: September 19, 1995 – May 29, 1997

Murder One is an American legal drama television series that aired on ABC from September 19, 1995, until May 29, 1997. The series was created by Steven Bochco, Charles H. Eglee, and Channing Gibson.

Like many of Bochco's previous series, Murder One was produced in association with 20th Century Fox Television. Sometime after the conclusion of Murder One, Bochco ended his longtime relationship with Fox and moved his production company over to Paramount, making Murder One his last production with Fox for over a decade.

In 1997, TV Guide ranked the first episode, "Chapter 1", #60 on its list of the 100 Greatest Episodes in television history.

== Premise ==
In its first season, the series starred Daniel Benzali as defense attorney Theodore (Ted) Hoffman, a criminal litigator and the principal of his own firm, Hoffman and Associates. Backed by a cadre of young associates, Hoffman was a gruff, masterful criminal lawyer who zealously represented his clients in high-profile cases. Patricia Clarkson played his wife, Annie. Unique for a television drama at that time, the first season of the series revolved around a single high-profile criminal case. Stanley Tucci played Richard Cross, a charming but morally ambiguous philanthropist and the first man arrested for the murder of 15-year-old Jessica Costello. Bobbie Phillips played Julie Costello, the murder victim's sister and the girlfriend of Richard Cross.

For the duration of season one, Hoffman defended Neil Avedon (Jason Gedrick), a young Hollywood star accused of the murder of Costello. During the first part of the season, Hoffman's associates also handled smaller cases which were usually wrapped up within one episode. While there were many plot twists and misdirections, fundamentally the entire season consisted of one defense case for Hoffman & Associates.

In the second season, Benzali was replaced by Anthony LaPaglia as Jimmy Wyler, a former assistant district attorney who took over Hoffman's firm. The second season also featured this type of seriality, to a limited extent: three unrelated trials, over 18 episodes.

The serial nature of the drama may have been problematic, leaving viewers who either missed episodes or did not see the series from its premiere at a loss. As a result, from about halfway through the first season, an increasingly detailed introduction began to take up several minutes at the start of each episode. Following somewhat disappointing ratings, ABC and Bochco revamped the show significantly for the 1996–97 season. Gone were Benzali and his character, as well as many of the show's former regulars including Clarkson, Gedrick, Tucci and Dylan Baker.

The producers brought in LaPaglia as the new owner of the firm to replace Benzali, but the second season of the show was far less successful than the first. The original concept of the series, a James Bond-like defense attorney, could not be salvaged with a replacement lead – not least of which because LaPaglia's character spent most episodes trying to borrow money to keep the firm afloat. Other cast members brought in for the second season included D. B. Woodside and Jack Kehler. ABC aired all the episodes filmed, and the plot was prematurely wrapped up in the final episode. ABC ordered the final six episodes to air as a three-night miniseries in the spring of 1997. As the hopes for a series renewal diminished, the three-night miniseries was rescheduled for the less-viewed Memorial Day weekend. The series was dropped at the end of the 1996-97 season.

Over its two-year run, ABC aired 41 original episodes. The first season of Murder One has aired several times on cable networks such as A&E and Court TV in the United States. (Court TV was substituted in the series by the fictional "Law TV".) Both seasons have been released on DVD in the US and UK, with different packaging in each country.

== Characters ==
=== Season 1 ===
==== Main cast ====
- Daniel Benzali as Theodore Hoffman
- Mary McCormack as Justine Appleton
- Michael Hayden as Chris Docknovich
- Grace Phillips as Lisa Gillespie
- J. C. MacKenzie as Arnold Spivak
- Stanley Tucci as Richard Cross
- Dylan Baker as Detective Arthur Polson
- Vanessa Estelle Williams as Lila
- John Fleck as Louis Hines
- Kevin Tighe as David Blalock
- Barbara Bosson as Deputy District Attorney Miriam Grasso
- Patricia Clarkson as Annie Hoffman
- Jason Gedrick as Neil Avedon

==== Recurring guest stars ====
- Donna Murphy as Francesca Cross
- Bobbie Phillips as Julie Costello
- Linda Carlson as Judge Beth Bornstein
- Stanley Kamel as Dr. Graham Lester
- Gregory Itzin as District Attorney Roger Garfield
- Joe Spano as Ray Velacek
- John Pleshette as Gary Blondo
- Nancy Lee Grahn as Connie Dahlgren
- Adam Scott as Sidney Schneider
- Alexia Robinson as Akeesha Wesley

=== Season 2 ===
==== Main cast ====
- Anthony LaPaglia as Jimmy Wyler
- Mary McCormack as Justine Appleton
- Michael Hayden as Chris Docknovich
- J. C. MacKenzie as Arnold Spivak
- D. B. Woodside as Aaron Mosley
- Barbara Bosson as Deputy District Attorney Miriam Grasso
- Clayton Rohner as Det. Vince Biggio
- Jack Kehler as Frank Szymanski
- Dan Gerrity as Ed Mizerac

==== Recurring guest stars ====
- Linda Carlson as Judge Beth Bornstein
- Gregory Itzin as District Attorney Roger Garfield
- John Fleck as Louis Hines
- Pruitt Taylor Vince as Clifford Banks
- Eileen Heckart as Frances Wyler
- Ralph Waite as Malcolm Dietrich
- Pauley Perrette as Gwen

== Episodes ==
=== Season 1 (1995–96) ===
No. overall	No. in season	Title	Directed by	Written by	Original release date	Prod. code
1	1	"Chapter One"	Charles Haid	Story by : Steven Bochco & Charles H. Eglee & Channing Gibson; Teleplay by : Charles H. Eglee & Channing Gibson and Steven Bochco & David Milch	September 19, 1995	7101
2	2	"Chapter Two"	Michael Fresco	Story by : Steven Bochco & Charles H. Eglee; Teleplay by : Charles H. Eglee	September 26, 1995	ON02
3	3	"Chapter Three"	Joe Ann Fogle	Ann Donahue	October 3, 1995	ON03
4	4	"Chapter Four"	Michael Fresco	Geoffrey Neigher	October 12, 1995	ON04
5	5	"Chapter Five"	Nancy Savoca	Charles Holland	October 19, 1995	ON05
6	6	"Chapter Six"	Jim Charleston	Gay Walch	November 2, 1995	ON06
7	7	"Chapter Seven"	Donna Deitch	Doug Palau	November 9, 1995	ON07
8	8	"Chapter Eight"	Michael Fresco	Story by : Steven Bochco & Charles H. Eglee; Teleplay by : Ann Donahue & Geoffrey Neigher & Charles Holland	November 16, 1995	ON08
9	9	"Chapter Nine"	Elodie Keene	Story by : Steven Bochco & William M. Finkelstein; Teleplay by : Doug Palau	December 31, 1995	ON09
10	10	"Chapter Ten"	Joe Ann Fogle	Story by : Steven Bochco & George Putnam; Teleplay by : William M. Finkelstein & Geoffrey Neigher	January 8, 1996	ON10
11	11	"Chapter Eleven"	Steven Robman	Ann Donahue & Charles Holland	January 15, 1996	ON11
12	12	"Chapter Twelve"	Rick Wallace	William M. Finkelstein & Charles H. Eglee	January 22, 1996	ON12
13	13	"Chapter Thirteen"	James Hayman	Geoffrey Neigher & Doug Palau	February 5, 1996	ON13
14	14	"Chapter Fourteen"	Randall Zisk	Story by : William M. Finkelstein & Charles H. Eglee; Teleplay by : Ann Donahue & Charles Holland	February 12, 1996	ON14
15	15	"Chapter Fifteen"	Randall Zisk	Story by : Steven Bochco; Teleplay by : Charles H. Eglee & William M. Finkelstein	February 19, 1996	ON15
16	16	"Chapter Sixteen"	Joe Napolitano	Story by : Charles H. Eglee & William M. Finkelstein; Teleplay by : Geoffrey Neigher & Doug Palau	March 4, 1996	ON16
17	17	"Chapter Seventeen"	Joe Ann Fogle	Story by : Charles H. Eglee; Teleplay by : Ann Donahue & Charles Holland	March 11, 1996	ON17
18	18	"Chapter Eighteen"	Lesli Linka Glatter	Story by : Steven Bochco & William M. Finkelstein; Teleplay by : Geoffrey Neigher & Doug Palau	March 18, 1996	ON18
19	19	"Chapter Nineteen"	Marc Buckland	Story by : Steven Bochco & William M. Finkelstein; Teleplay by : William M. Finkelstein & Charles H. Eglee	April 1, 1996	ON19
20	20	"Chapter Twenty"	Donna Deitch	Story by : Steven Bochco & Charles H. Eglee; Teleplay by : Geoffrey Neigher & Doug Palau	April 8, 1996	ON20
21	21	"Chapter Twenty-One"	Marc Buckland	Story by : Steven Bochco & Charles H. Eglee; Teleplay by : William M. Finkelstein & Ann Donahue	April 22, 1996	ON21
22	22	"Chapter Twenty-Two"	Joe Ann Fogle	Story by : Steven Bochco & William M. Finkelstein; Teleplay by : Charles H. Eglee & Charles Holland	April 22, 1996	ON22
23	23	"Chapter Twenty-Three"	Michael Fresco	Story by : Steven Bochco & William M. Finkelstein & Charles H. Eglee; Teleplay by : Geoffrey Neigher & Doug Palau	April 23, 1996	ON23

=== Season 2 (1996–97) ===
No. overall	No. in season	Title	Directed by	Written by	Original release date	Prod. code	Viewers (millions)
24	1	"Chapter One, Year Two"	Michael Fresco	Story by : Steven Bochco & Charles H. Eglee; Teleplay by : Geoffrey Neigher & Doug Palau	October 10, 1996	OU01	N/A
25	2	"Chapter Two, Year Two"	Joe Ann Fogle	Alfonso Moreno	October 17, 1996	OU02	N/A
26	3	"Chapter Three, Year Two"	Elodie Keene	Charles H. Eglee & Nick Harding	October 24, 1996	OU03	N/A
27	4	"Chapter Four, Year Two"	Rick Wallace	Story by : Steven Bochco & Charles H. Eglee; Teleplay by : Doug Palau	November 7, 1996	OU04	N/A
28	5	"Chapter Five, Year Two"	Marc Buckland	Story by : Steven Bochco & Charles H. Eglee; Teleplay by : Geoffrey Neigher & Nick Harding	November 14, 1996	OU05	N/A
29	6	"Chapter Six, Year Two"	Randall Zisk	Story by : Steven Bochco & Charles H. Eglee; Teleplay by : Doug Palau	November 21, 1996	OU06	N/A
30	7	"Chapter Seven, Year Two"	Adam Nimoy	Story by : Steven Bochco & Charles H. Eglee; Teleplay by : Geoffrey Neigher & Nick Harding	December 5, 1996	OU07	N/A
31	8	"Chapter Eight, Year Two"	Joe Ann Fogle	Story by : Steven Bochco & Charles H. Eglee; Teleplay by : Geoffrey Neigher & Doug Palau	December 12, 1996	OU08	N/A
32	9	"Chapter Nine, Year Two"	Marc Buckland	William M. Finkelstein	January 9, 1997	OU09	N/A
33	10	"Chapter Ten, Year Two"	Donna Deitch	William M. Finkelstein	January 16, 1997	OU10	6.80
34	11	"Chapter Eleven, Year Two"	Michael Fresco	Story by : William M. Finkelstein; Teleplay by : Charles H. Eglee & Geoffrey Neigher & Nick Harding	January 23, 1997	OU11	N/A
35	12	"Chapter Twelve, Year Two"	Randall Zisk	William M. Finkelstein & Charles H. Eglee	January 23, 1997	OU12	N/A
36	13	"Chapter Thirteen, Year Two"	Donna Deitch	Story by : Steven Bochco & Charles H. Eglee; Teleplay by : Doug Palau	May 25, 1997	OU13	8.30
37	14	"Chapter Fourteen, Year Two"	Marc Buckland	Story by : Steven Bochco & Charles H. Eglee; Teleplay by : Geoffrey Neigher & Doug Palau	May 25, 1997	OU14	8.30
38	15	"Chapter Fifteen, Year Two"	Donna Deitch	Story by : Steven Bochco & Charles H. Eglee; Teleplay by : Charles H. Eglee & Nick Harding	May 26, 1997	OU15	N/A
39	16	"Chapter Sixteen, Year Two"	Michael Fresco	Story by : Steven Bochco & Charles H. Eglee; Teleplay by : Doug Palau	May 26, 1997	OU16	N/A
40	17	"Chapter Seventeen, Year Two"	Marc Buckland	Story by : Steven Bochco & Charles H. Eglee; Teleplay by : Geoffrey Neigher	May 29, 1997	OU17	N/A
41	18	"Chapter Eighteen, Year Two"	Marc Buckland	Story by : Steven Bochco & Charles H. Eglee; Teleplay by : Charles H. Eglee & Geoffrey Neigher & Nick Harding & Doug Palau	May 29, 1997	OU18	N/A

== Storylines ==
=== Season 1 ===
==== The Goldilocks Murder ====
Ted Hoffman defends young Hollywood heartthrob Neil Avedon on criminal mischief charges after he attacks a swan and urges him to change his Hollywood lifestyle of sex and drugs before he gets into serious trouble. Neil ignores his advice, and Ted instructs his office to no longer take Neil's calls.

A media explosion occurs with the murder of 15-year-old Jessica Costello, who is found raped, tied up, and strangled in her apartment. Jessica was promiscuous with many powerful men in Hollywood, making them suspects and the case a media frenzy. One of these men, multi-millionaire Richard Cross, whose mistress Julie Costello is Jessica's older sister, is arrested after the police have a security video of Richard in the building at the time of the murder. Ted is hired and quickly has the charges against Richard dismissed for lack of evidence.

The next suspect is Neil Avedon who begs Ted to defend him. The state has a vast amount of evidence against him: Neil's fingerprints were found all over the crime scene; his DNA was found inside Jessica; he was known for indulging in sadomachistic sex and strangling his lovers; and he allegedly confessed to his psychiatrist Graham Lester that he killed Jessica. Neil admits to making love to Jessica around the time of the murder but denies killing her or confessing to it. Knowing that this will be the next trial of the century Ted takes the case and puts the young attorney Chris Docknovich as second chair. From the beginning Ted finds Richard is interfering with the case. He sends Neil to the psychiatrist Graham Lester to supply drugs. Ted and Chris get Neil into a drug rehabilitation center so he can remain sober for the first time in a long time.

Ted's private detective Davey Blalock has a stunning revelation. A criminal friend is brokering a videotape said to prove Neil's innocence. Davey calls and confirms its authenticity and Ted authorizes the purchase at an enormous price. However, the next day Davey and his friend are found murdered in a motel room with an empty VCR. Ted suspects the video implicated Richard who then hired a professional assassin to retrieve the tape.

The focal point of the trial becomes Neil's alleged confession to Dr. Lester. Ted pokes holes in Lester's story. A nurse did not note the confession phone in her logbook which she lost because she spilled coffee on it. Ted finds that the nurse's brother has AIDS and is undergoing expensive experimental treatment paid for by Richard. When Dr. Lester takes the stand he refuses to testify citing doctor-patient privilege. When the judge tells him this does not apply he still refuses and is jailed. This victory for the defense turns out to be a ruse because a week later Dr. Lester agrees to testify. His earlier protection of Neil makes his testimony all the more damning. For the defense Ted must discredit Dr. Lester. Their star witness is Julie Costello, who has turned against her boyfriend Richard. She believes that Richard killed Jessica and will testify about how Dr. Lester would drug and rape her and other patients.

When Julie is called to the stand the very next day Ted is stunned that Julie has completely reversed her story. When Ted asks her if she's had any contact with Richard she asks the judge, "Isn't there a law against testifying against your spouse?" Richard and Julie are now married. Ted next introduces Jessica's diary into evidence which graphically chronicled her sexual liaisons with hundreds of Hollywood's leading men. Ted suggests many other possible suspects. One of these is film producer Gary Blondo. Reluctant to testify about sex with 15-year-old Jessica, Gary's lawyers insist that he cannot testify because he is gravely ill in the hospital. When Ted shows photos of Gary drinking champagne and partying in the hospital the outraged judge orders Gary to testify immediately. Still playing sick, Gary's lawyers bring him into court in a wheelchair. When Ted confronts him about sex with Jessica, Gary denies it. As Gary is wheeled out of the courtroom, Ted says to Chris, "If there's ever a nuclear holocaust, stand next to Gary Blondo. He's a survivor."

Against Ted's advice Neil takes the stand to profess his innocence. But on cross-examination he admits he was too high that night to even know if he did or didn't kill Jessica.

The jury convicts Neil of Jessica's murder. The prosecutor Miriam Grasso insists that Neil's bail be revoked and that he not be shown any celebrity treatment and be put into the prison's general population. Although Ted vows to appeal, the judge gives a lengthy speech on her disgust with Neil for his brutal crime and how in the face of "overwhelming evidence" he's shown no remorse. Neil is taken away in chains crying. The next day Neil's fears are realized as he becomes the celebrity target in a hardened prison.

Knowing Neil can't survive in prison any longer, Ted makes one last desperate plea to Richard and Julie to come clean with what really happened that night. Ted discovers that Richard is dying of AIDS and would videotape Jessica having sex. Richard agrees to testify and authenticate the sought after videotape showing Richard's drug lord friend Roberto Portalegre murdering Jessica. It is also revealed that Portalegre sent the assassin to kill Dave Blalock when the video tape exposing Richard's alibi surfaced. He also had Holly Gerges, who was an obsessed fan of Neil's, killed whilst in police custody and was behind the kidnapping of Ted's daughter, Elizabeth. Neil is vindicated and Portalegre is subsequently arrested for the murder of Jessica Costello.

Portalegre offers to pay Ted 20 million dollars to defend him, considering lawyers willing to do anything for money. Ted declines his offer and later leaves his law practice in the hopes of reconciling with his wife.

At the celebration party, Chris confides in Ted that he was considering paying off an official in the District Attorney's Office who offered to have Neil's conviction overturned. Ted, who previously stated his opposition to the offer, surprises Chris by pulling out a suitcase full of money which was presumably intended to pay off the same official.

Portalegre is convicted of the murder and sentenced to death. Dr. Lester is convicted of perjury and obstruction of justice and sentenced to ten years in prison. Richard dies nine days after taking the witness stand.

=== Season 2 ===
==== The Angry Lone Nut ====
Assistant District Attorney Jimmy Wyler is outraged when he is denied his promotion to prosecute major crimes. He confronts District Attorney Roger Garfield who is running for governor of California. Garfield tells Jimmy that when he's governor they won't have to work together anymore. Jimmy responds, "You're elected governor and I'll kiss your ass in Macy's window."

The next morning Jimmy sees on the news that the current governor, Tom Van Allan, who was running for reelection was assassinated along with one of his mistresses in a beach house. At the office Jimmy learns that the killer was caught fleeing the scene. Sharon Rooney, one of Van Allan's many mistresses was a woman scorned who used her roommate's pistol to kill the two. With overwhelming evidence the police and district attorney have no doubt she's guilty. Jimmy visits Sharon in her holding cell. She is exactly the emotional wreck the police described. Angry about his denied promotion, Jimmy offers to switch sides and defend Sharon pro bono. She accepts, and confesses to Jimmy that she is indeed guilty as charged.

Jimmy next visits Hoffman and Associates. Without Hoffman, the associates are barely able to keep the firm up and running and Chris had offered the firm to Jimmy. Jimmy asks for their help on the case assuring them that after he wins the trial of the century the business will boom. Wyler and Associates is born. Jimmy assigns Justine Appleton as second chair because she is a woman approximately the same age as Sharon.

The prosecuting assistant district attorney Miriam Grasso lays out the strongest case possible. Sharon left her husband to become Van Allan's mistress. When Sharon became pregnant Van Allan forced her to have an abortion. After the abortion Sharon became mentally unstable and Van Allan ended the affair. Forensic evidence shows Sharon at the crime scene and she was caught fleeing the crime scene. The recovered gun ballistically matches the bullets used to commit the crime and was registered to her roommate.

Jimmy quickly loses friends and makes enemies as he attempts to discredit his former friends in the police department. Miriam is angry that he overheard discussions related to the case before he quit the district attorney's office. During the trial, Jimmy uses information from his past as a DA to discredit his former co-workers; for example, Detective Biggio sent an innocent man to prison where he was killed before his release, and he uses a forensic examiner's attention deficit disorder (ADD) to try to convince the jury that he may have been confused at the crime scene

Jimmy begins to suspect the assassination is bigger than simply an angry lone nut. His office is bugged, a billionaire Malcolm Dietrich attempts to buy him off, and key witnesses are turning up dead.

Jimmy requests an immediate mistrial. The judge denies a mistrial and rules that the jury may consider Sharon's outburst and that she will have waived her Fifth Amendment right and can be subjected to cross-examination by the prosecution if she has any more such outburst in the courtroom.

Jimmy's big break comes when Van Allan's campaign manager Larry White tells Jimmy that he was actually a spy for Dietrich hired to get Garfield elected. Larry witnessed massive corruption, scandal, and even murder. The Governor had made many powerful enemies like Dietrich with the means, motive, and opportunity to have him assassinated.

Larry is emotionally remorseful for his crimes and requests no money for his testimony. Given the short life span of past witnesses, Jimmy places him in secret protective custody.

After exhaustive measures to keep Larry safe, he finally makes it to the witness stand. He lays out a detailed saga of Van Allan and Garfield's massive corruption and crimes where literally billions of dollars changed hands. The enormity of the election and the assassination are finally realized. As Larry testifies he is visibly ill and loosens his tie drinking water before finally dropping dead on the courtroom floor. Miriam stands over his dead body and with a smile requests that his testimony be excluded, "Since it doesn't appear as though I'll have an opportunity to cross-examine him." With his star witness's testimony gone, Jimmy calls Sharon to the stand without any preparation, against the advice of his associates.

The courtroom holds its breath as Sharon tells her heartbreaking story of being a young woman in love who grew distant from her husband because of his long hours as a doctor. Her affair with the Governor was a fairy tale as Van Allan treated her opulently. Upon telling him of her pregnancy he offered to leave his wife and marry her after the election, but only if she aborted their child. Sharon describes the abortion in graphic detail and how it sickened her to end the life of her first child. Of course Van Allan did not keep his promise and instead dumped her immediately. She confesses to Jimmy that she did not kill the Governor and when she called herself a murderer she was referring to her child. She accepts the possible eventuality of a murder conviction and death sentence as an opportunity to be with her baby.

On cross-examination Miriam shows how Sharon's misery only proves her motive for the assassination. "You wanted to make him pay, because he should pay, for what he did to you and what he did to your baby." Miriam then asks her how it is that if she is innocent, all the physical evidence points to her. To this Sharon has no answer.

The jury is clearly affected by Sharon's testimony as they acquit her despite the overwhelming physical evidence. Both the defense and prosecution are shocked by the verdict as well as the angry and vocal media.

That night Jimmy and the firm throw a victory party at a bar and grill. Still emotionally unstable, Sharon slits her wrists in the restroom, killing herself.

Jimmy is contacted from jail by Mafia hit man Carmine D'Nardis. He provides details confirming that he assassinated the governor and wants Jimmy to broker a deal with the police to tell them everything in exchange for witness protection. But he doubts he will live long enough to make the deal. Jimmy presents the case to Detective Biggio and asks him to help bring the true murderer of Governor Van Allan to justice. Through an intermediary, Jimmy is offered millions for giving up Carmine's location. Through a series of sting operations and wire tapping with police they are able to uncover the conspiracy all the way up to Dietrich and Garfield.

Jimmy and Miriam go together to confront now Governor Garfield in his office. Miriam is enraged that he used her in his cover up. Garfield tearfully and cowardly begs forgiveness, insisting they were going to do it anyway and there was nothing he could do to stop them. Unsympathetic, Miriam reminds him that he deliberately planned the wrongful prosecution of a mentally traumatized innocent who is now dead. Miriam grants Garfield full immunity in exchange for his testifying against Dietrich. Jimmy goes to Dietrich's office for a final confrontation and as he walks out, Detective Biggio comes into the office to place Dietrich under arrest. Garfield was later seen resigning from being Governor-elect on TV. Instead of admitting wrongdoings, he blames Dietrich and says he does not deserve to be the governor because his campaign was associated and aided by Dietrich.

==== Juice of the Court ====
(Although not credited this story is obviously based on the O. J. Simpson murder case.)

Wyler & Associates' next big case comes from Rickey Latrell. An NBA superstar, he is charged with shooting his team's owner Sandy Portas in his office. The evidence is overwhelming, Rickey was in Sandy's office around the time of the murder and the murder weapon recovered in a waste treatment plant is registered to Rickey.

The case is assigned to Chris Docknovich who chooses Aaron Mosley as his second chair. Immediately the two begin arguing over trial strategy. Aaron wants to make race the focus of the trial, and wants to be first chair because he's black like Rickey. Aaron wants to get a mostly black jury and accuse the police of racism. Chris agrees the race card should be played but it should not be their only card. He hopes to win over the white jurors with his good looks and charm.

Race immediately becomes the focal point of the trial during jury selection as Chris and Aaron accuse all white jurors as being racists. The prosecution team of district attorneys Scotto and Paige Weikopf attempt to exclude all black jurors as being anti-government and favorable toward a black celebrity. In the end, the jury is 50/50 black and white. Most of the trial's witnesses are character witnesses. The prosecution's witnesses portray Rickey as a corrupt NBA superstar with a history of violence who indulged in gambling and prostitutes. Their star witness is a bookie Rickey owed money to. The bookie recorded Rickey offering to throw games to clear his debt, and used this tape to blackmail Sandy into paying off his own dept to the bookie. If true this would give Rickey overwhelming motive to kill Sandy and recover the tape. The defense argues that without the tape or Sandy's testimony the entire event rests on the words of a bookie who's cut a deal with the DA.

The defense puts on witness after witness attesting to Rickey's character as a black role model who overcame poverty in the inner city to become one of the most famous men in the world. They claim Rickey displayed strong religious and family values, while Sandy gambled and owed money to organized crime. However, their biggest character witness, Rickey's wife Carla, ends up hurting them on cross-examination when she acknowledges Rickey beat her and that she had an affair with Sandy.

Chris and Aaron were unaware of the affair and put their hope in Rickey's testimony of innocence, asking Jimmy to prep him. As a former prosecutor Jimmy mercilessly badgers Rickey with the evidence against him until he snaps and confesses to the murder. Sandy had used the gambling tape to blackmail Carla into sleeping with him.

Jimmy takes charge of the case and insists that Rickey's only chance for an acquittal is "jury nullification", when the jury concludes that under the law the defendant is guilty but that the law itself is wrong. This will fall in line with the defense strategy of arguing celebrity and not evidence. The not guilty plea stands but Rickey takes the stand and confesses to the murder. The judge, jury, and media are all shocked along with the prosecution who effectively has no case since all their arguments have been stipulated to.

While the jury is deliberating Rickey flees the country since he has confessed to murder. Jimmy tracks him down in Mexico and persuades him that his trial strategy will work.

Rickey is acquitted and returns to the basketball season a bigger star than ever, preaching to the media about civil rights and how the racist government can't keep blacks as slaves anymore. As Rickey thanks Wyler & Associates, Aaron says, "Do you think being black was the reason you were prosecuted for murder?... Then stop talking like it is, because what you say means a lot to our people."

==== The Street Sweeper ====
Jimmy inherits his next big case from a friend dying of cancer. Serial killer Clifford Banks, played by Pruitt Taylor Vince, became known as the "Street Sweeper" for 17 murders. Police found a dismembered body in his van which led them to his home where they found the murder weapons, personal effects of the victims, and a journal Clifford kept of how he planned and committed the murders while making plans for more. The blue collar Clifford was intending to pay for his high-profile defense with the movie adaptation of his story being made by sleazy and comical Hollywood producer Gary Blondo.

Jimmy visits the terrifyingly creepy Clifford in jail, where he tells Jimmy that his crimes are justified because he killed criminals who were freed by a corrupt judicial system. He became a vigilante after Jimmy let a murderer, Osvaldo Cesarus, plead to manslaughter. Jimmy recalls pleading what he dismisses as a rather minor case as district attorney. Osvaldo was a junkie who killed a crippled mentally handicapped man for his television. Clifford angrily reveals that the victim was his younger brother whom he had taken care of all his life. The two men become bitter enemies immediately. Seeing the case as unwinnable, Jimmy wants Clifford to plead temporary insanity and avoid the death penalty. When Clifford refuses claiming his actions were justified, Jimmy attempts to have Clifford declared mentally unfit to stand trial. But Clifford successfully and vocally professes his sanity.

Clifford's psychotic behavior is the prosecution's best weapon as he must remain shackled at all times and flanked by guards. Even meeting with Jimmy he claws viciously at the bars separating them trying to kill Jimmy for arguing he was insane.

At trial, prosecutor Miriam Grasso unleashes her mountain of evidence and calls Clifford to the stand asking him how he planned and carried out the murders, much to the objections of Jimmy. The judge allows the testimony. Clifford responds by requesting a glass of water. "This is going to take long time."

Jimmy zealously defends his client by successfully arguing the police did not have a probable cause to search the van containing a dead body. Hence, all evidence against Clifford is "fruit from the poisonous tree". Miriam argues that Clifford's "street sweeping" could not have gone on indefinitely and it was only a matter of time before the police would have caught him. She further argues that he is a danger to society.

The judge, known for being a strict constructionist rules that Clifford's Fourth Amendment rights to unlawful search and seizure were violated and he is free to go, upon which Clifford asks for his gun collection back. Outside the media and public are stunned as a confessed serial killer is freed. Clifford boasts how his freedom shows how corrupt the judicial system is and how his actions were justified. As the attorneys nervously drive Clifford home, their limousine is riddled with bullets by a vigilante seen earlier. Chris Docknovich is seriously wounded. Being the only witness to see the shooter's face, Clifford is brought by the police to a line-up. He recognizes the shooter but lies to the police telling them he does not. Under constant surveillance by the police, Clifford is quickly rearrested for rearming himself and stalking the limousine shooter and his brother's killer Osvaldo. Again Jimmy comes to his defense arguing that he has not broken any law and was merely exercising his Second Amendment rights. Clifford is freed.

Jimmy consults a psychiatrist who concludes that based on Clifford's actions, he murdered his own brother to avoid being burdened by his healthcare. His guilt caused a break from reality and he blamed the murder on Osvaldo and took out his rage on other criminals. When Jimmy confronts Clifford with the theory, he angrily pulls out a gun ready to kill Jimmy. Clifford then breaks down in tears realizing he did murder his own brother. Although Clifford cannot be tried again for his "street sweeping", he pleads guilty to murdering his brother and requests the maximum sentence. Clifford is sentenced to life in prison without the possibility of parole.

== Crew ==
The series was created by Steven Bochco, Charles H. Eglee and Channing Gibson. All three were regular writers and Bochco and Eglee were executive producers for the series. William M. Finkelstein was an executive producer and writer for the third season. Michael Fresco served as co-executive producer and a regular director for the first season, he was promoted to executive producer for the second season. Joe Ann Fogel served as a supervising producer and regular director for the first season, she was promoted to co-executive producer for the second season. Marc Buckland served as a producer and a regular director. Geoffrey Neigher worked as a producer and regular writer for the first season and was promoted to supervising producer for the second season. Doug Palau served as a story editor and regular writer for the first season and was promoted to executive story editor and then co-producer for the second season. Shannon Downs worked as a regular writer for the second season. Ann Donahue served as a supervising producer and regular writer for the first season. She was replaced by Nick Harding for the second series.

== International airings ==
In the United Kingdom, the series appeared on Sky One during the first half of 1996. Each episode of the first twenty was rerun on BBC Two about seven weeks later. Due to the 1996 Summer Olympics there was a break before the last three episodes, causing an outcry against sport disrupting the schedules, and the last three episodes were screened over two nights after the games.

In Germany the series was first shown on VOX.

== Home releases ==
20th Century Fox has released the entire series on DVD in Region 1, 2, and 4.

DVD Name	No. of episodes	Release dates		
DVD Name	No. of episodes	Region 1	Region 2	Region 4
Season One	23	February 8, 2005	September 6, 2004	April 7, 2006
Season Two	18	November 15, 2005	October 18, 2004	April 7, 2006

== Awards and nominations ==
Year	Award	Category	Recipient	Result
1996	American Society of Cinematographers Award	Outstanding Achievement in Cinematography in Regular Series	Aaron Schneider (For episode "Chapter Four")	Won
1997	American Society of Cinematographers Award	Outstanding Achievement in Cinematography in Regular Series	Aaron Schneider (For episode "Chapter Nine")	Won
1997	British Academy Television Award	Foreign TV Program Award		Won
1996	Casting Society of America's Artios Award	Best Casting for TV, Dramatic Pilot	Junie Lowry-Johnson and Alexa L. Fogel	Won
1996	Casting Society of America's Artios Award	Best Casting for TV, Dramatic Episodic	Junie Lowry-Johnson and Alexa L. Fogel	Nominated
1997	Casting Society of America's Artios Award	Best Casting for TV, Dramatic Episodic	Junie Lowry-Johnson and Alexa L. Fogel	Nominated
1996	Cinema Audio Society Award	Outstanding Achievement in Sound Mixing for a Television Series	Robert Appere, Kenneth R. Burton and Susan Moore-Chong (For episode "Chapter Three")	Nominated
1996	Directors Guild of America Award	Outstanding Directing – Drama Series	Charles Haid (For episode "Chapter One")	Nominated
1996	Golden Globe Award	Best Television Series – Drama		Nominated
1996	Golden Globe Award	Best Actor – Television Series Drama	Daniel Benzali	Nominated
1997	NAACP Image Award	Outstanding Supporting Actress in a Drama Series	Vanessa Williams	Nominated
1997	Online Film & Television Association Award	Best Writing in a Drama Series		Nominated
1997	Online Film & Television Association Award	Best Episode of a Drama Series	"Chapter Thirteen, Year Two"	Nominated
1996	People's Choice Award	Favorite New TV Dramatic Series		Won
1996	Primetime Emmy Award	Outstanding Supporting Actor in a Drama Series	Stanley Tucci	Nominated
1996	Primetime Emmy Award	Outstanding Supporting Actress in a Drama Series	Barbara Bosson	Nominated
1996	Primetime Emmy Award	Outstanding Writing for a Drama Series	Charles H. Eglee, Channing Gibson, Steven Bochco and David Milch (For episode "Chapter One")	Nominated
1996	Primetime Emmy Award	Outstanding Directing for a Drama Series	Charles Haid (For episode "Chapter One")	Nominated
1996	Primetime Emmy Award	Outstanding Main Title Theme Music	Mike Post	Won
1996	Primetime Emmy Award	Outstanding Cinematography for a Series	Aaron Schneider (For episode "Chapter One")	Nominated
1996	Primetime Emmy Award	Outstanding Art Direction for a Series	Paul Eads, Mindy Roffman and Mary Ann Biddle (For episode "Chapter One")	Won
1997	Primetime Emmy Award	Outstanding Guest Actor in a Drama Series	Pruitt Taylor Vince	Won
1997	Satellite Award	Best Supporting Actor – Series, Miniseries or Television Film	Stanley Tucci	Won
1996	Television Critics Association Award	Program of the Year		Nominated
1996	Television Critics Association Award	Outstanding Achievement in Drama		Nominated
1996	Viewers for Quality Television Award	Best Supporting Actor in a Quality Drama Series	Stanley Tucci	Won
1996	Viewers for Quality Television Award	Best Supporting Actress in a Quality Drama Series	Barbara Bosson	Won
1997	Viewers for Quality Television Award	Best Supporting Actress in a Quality Drama Series	Barbara Bosson	Nominated
1997	Viewers for Quality Television Award	Best Recurring Player	Pruitt Taylor Vince	Won
1997	Writers Guild of America Award	Episodic Drama	Charles H. Eglee, Channing Gibson, Steven Bochco and David Milch (For episode "Chapter One")	Nominated
