= Channing Gibson =

American television writer and producer

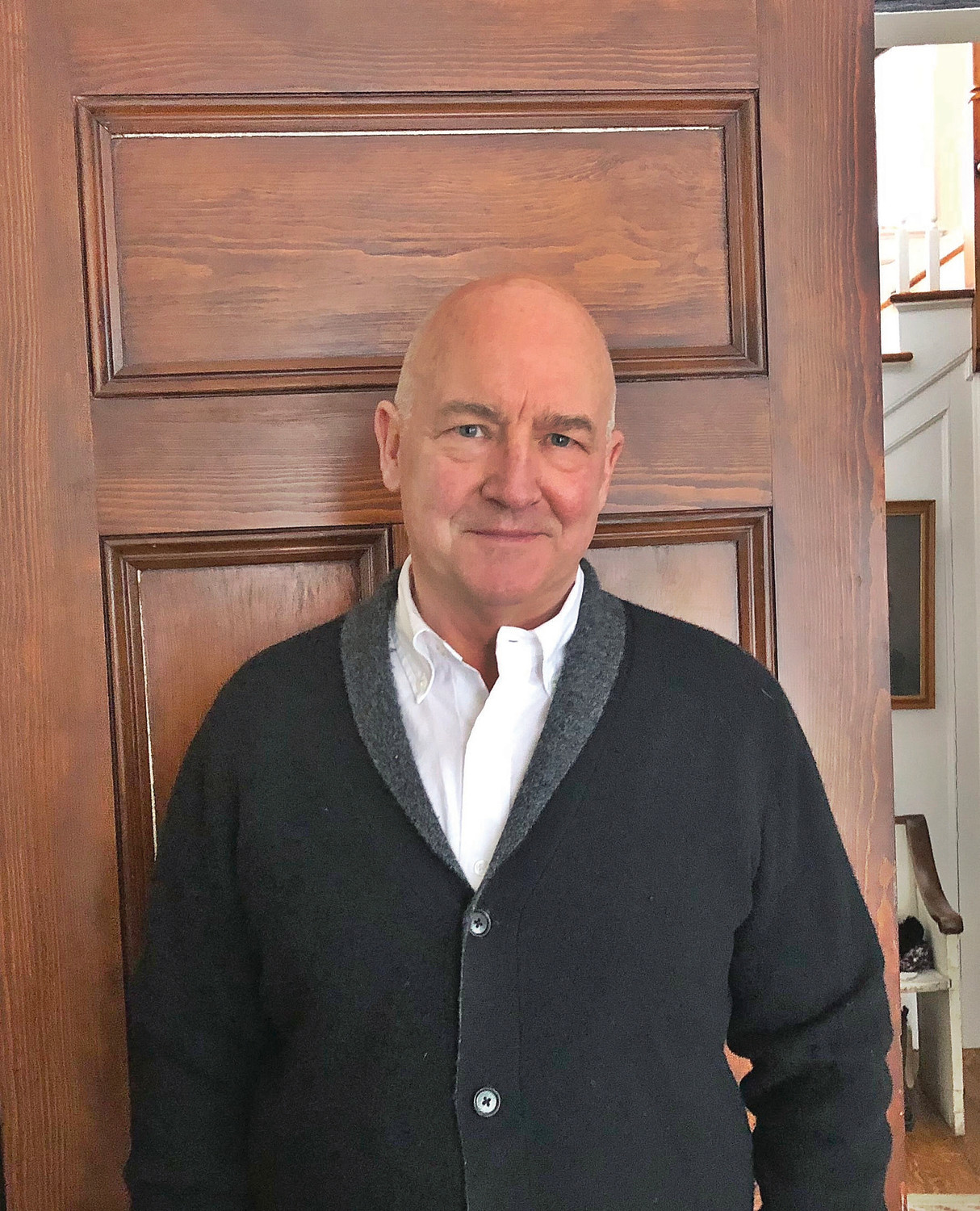
- Gibson in 2018
- Born: Richard Channing Gibson; United States
- Occupations: Screenwriter, television producer

Richard Channing Gibson is an American screenwriter and producer. He worked in both capacities with St. Elsewhere and NYPD Blue. He is one of the creators of the drama series Murder One and The Byrds of Paradise.

== Career ==
Gibson began working in television as a writer on ABC drama series Family in 1978. He wrote the fourth season episode "Magic" and the story for later fourth season episode "An Apple for the Teacher". He moved on to write for Eight Is Enough. He wrote the fourth season episode "Memories" and returned for the fifth-season episode "Welcome to Memorial Dr. Bradford".

He began writing for the NBC medical drama St. Elsewhere in 1984. He wrote the third-season episode "My Aim Is True". He returned to co-write the fourth season episodes "Haunted" and "Sanctuary" in 1985. Gibson and his co-writers were nominated for the Emmy Award for outstanding writing for a drama series for their work on "Haunted". Gibson and his co-writers were nominated for the Humanitas Prize for television in the 60-minute category for their work on the episode "Sanctuary". He served as a story editor for the fifth season in 1986. He co-wrote the episode "A Room with a View". He was nominated for a second Humanitas Prize for "A Room with a View". He was promoted to producer for the series sixth and final season in 1987. He co-wrote the story for a five episode arc for the final season in 1988 including the episodes "Their Town", "The Naked Civil Surgeon", "Requiem for a Heavyweight", "Split Decision" and "The Abby Singer Show". He was a co-writer for the series finale "The Last One". Gibson and the rest of the production team were nominated for the Emmy Award for outstanding drama series for their work on the sixth season in 1988. Gibson and his co-writers were also nominated for the Emmy Award for outstanding writing for a drama series for their work on "The Last One".

He became a writer for the sixth season of L. A. Law in 1992 and co-wrote the episode "Beauty and the Beast" and the season finale "Say Goodnight Gracie". The series was produced by Steven Bochco.

He was a co-creator of the short-lived ABC family drama The Byrds of Paradise which aired from March to June 1994. The series was produced by Bochco. In addition to the pilot he wrote or co-wrote the episodes "Moon, Man", "Mi Casa es Tsunami", "The Bottle Show", "Back in the Saddle" and "Kimo the Magnificent".

He became a co-executive producer for the second season of Bochco and David Milch created ABC police drama NYPD Blue in 1994. He wrote the episodes "Cop Suey", "The Final Adjustment" and "Don We Now Our Gay Apparel". Gibson and the production team won the Emmy Award for outstanding series for their work on the second season.

Along with Bochco and Charles H. Eglee Channing created the drama series Murder One. Gibson was nominated for the Emmy Award for outstanding writing for a drama series for his work on the series premiere "Chapter One".

Gibson went on to write the feature films Lethal Weapon 4 (1998), Cradle 2 the Grave (2003) and Walking Tall (2004). Gibson has been recruited by Richard Donner to write the script for a fifth Lethal Weapon film.

== Filmography ==
=== Film ===
Year	Title	Writer	Producer
1998	Lethal Weapon 4	Yes	No
2003	Cradle 2 the Grave	Yes	No
2004	Walking Tall	Yes	No

Uncredited revisions

- Red Planet (2000)
- Collateral Damage (2002)

=== Television ===
Year	Title	Creator	Writer	Producer	Notes
1978-79	Family	No	Yes	No	Writer (1978: 1 episode); Story (1979: 1 episode)
1980	Eight Is Enough	No	Yes	No	Writer (1980: 2 episodes)
1984-88	St. Elsewhere	No	Yes	Yes	Writer (1984-88: 19 episodes); Story (1984-88: 26 episodes); Producer (1987-88: 20 episodes); Story editor (1986: 1 episode)
1988-89	Tattingers	No	Yes	Yes	Writer (1988-89: 5 episodes); Producer (1988-89: 9 episodes)
1991	Rockenwagner	No	No	Yes	Television Pilot
1992	L.A. Law	No	Yes	No	Writer (1992: 2 episodes)
1992-93	Civil Wars	No	Yes	Yes	Writer (1992-93: 13 episodes); Co-Executive Producer (1992-93: 3 episodes)
1994	The Byrds of Paradise	Yes	Yes	Yes	Writer (1994: 4 episodes); Story (1994: 2 episodes); Producer (1994: 12 episodes)
1994-95	NYPD Blue	No	Yes	Yes	Writer (1994-95: 3 episodes); Executive Producer (1994-95: 13 episodes); Creative Consultant (1995: 9 episodes)
1995-97	Murder One	Yes	Yes	No	Writer (1995: 1 episode); Story (1995: 1 episode)
