= The Byrds of Paradise =

- Genre: Drama
- Created by: Charles H. Eglee; Channing Gibson
- Starring: Timothy Busfield; Seth Green; Jennifer Love Hewitt; Ryan O'Donohue; Arlo Guthrie; Elizabeth Lindsey; Bruce Weitz
- Opening theme: Mike Post
- Country of origin: United States
- Original language: English
- No. of seasons: 1
- No. of episodes: 13 (1 unaired)

Production
- Executive producers: Steven Bochco; Charles H. Eglee
- Running time: 47 minutes
- Production companies: Steven Bochco Productions; 20th Century Fox Television

Original release
- Network: ABC
- Release: March 3 – June 23, 1994

The Byrds of Paradise is an American drama television series that ran on ABC from March 3 to June 23, 1994, during the 1993–94 season. One of the few series executive produced by Steven Bochco that he did not help create, the hour-long drama centers on a father and his three children, abruptly relocated to Hawaii from New Haven, Connecticut after the sudden death of the children's mother. Much of the show dealt with the titular Byrd family adjusting to their lives in an entirely new environment as they recovered from their loss.

Filmed on location in the state of Hawaii, The Byrds of Paradise was unique in the inclusion of the local culture of Hawaii in the lives of the originally mainland Byrd family—rather than their maintaining a lifestyle nearly indistinguishable from that on the mainland—with Hawaii's tropical scenery serving primarily as an attractive background.

== Plot ==
Sam Byrd, the family's father, accepts a headmaster's position at a private school in Hawaii, which his children attend along with local students. All of the Byrds interact with local characters, some of whom speak pidgin (performed with varying degrees of authenticity) and reflect a far more realistic portrait of Hawaii's culture than is usually shown in film and television depictions of Hawaii. This tendency includes the romantic interests of the Byrds, who are local characters (played by local actors) rather than mainland transplants. Topics such as teenage pregnancy and underage drinking were featured, as are usually presented in a television show with teens as central characters.

One of the more distinctive aspects of The Byrds of Paradise was the role of Dr. Murray Rubinstein, an unpretentious beachside psychiatrist. Originally doctor to Franny, the temperamental middle child who is the most obviously traumatized by her mother's death, Murray eventually treats Sam, the children's father who is also suffering from the loss of his wife. A voice of reason who counsels his patients with an unconventional bedside manner, the doctor makes significant progress with Franny and Sam.

Again in a more realistic rather than idealized representation of Hawaii, a tsunami strikes mid-season, threatening the lives of several characters. The doctor's residence is destroyed, prompting him to continue his practice on chairs in the sand while he is rebuilding his house.

While the finished episodes were not aired in their entirety on the mainland, one of the last episodes, entitled "Twelfth Night o' Whatevah", featuring a school production of Shakespeare presented entirely in pidgin, was aired in Hawaii.

== Cast ==
- Timothy Busfield as Sam Byrd
- Seth Green as Harry Byrd
- Jennifer Love Hewitt as Franny Byrd
- Ryan O'Donohue as Zeke Byrd
- Arlo Guthrie as Alan Moon
- Elizabeth Lindsey as Healani Douglas
- Bruce Weitz as Dr. Murray Rubinstein

== Reception ==
Variety television critic Tony Scott describes the series as a "viable if familiar concept for family viewing" that "plays comfortably and attractively." He further states that the realistic treatment of the difficulties faced by a family moving from the mainland to Hawaii "give the program heft." Ken Tucker of Entertainment Weekly found the series to be "at once charming and predictable." Tucker found Busfield's character to be more confident and decent than his other roles, in particular Elliot Weston on thirtysomething. "When Busfield plays nice, his natural glow dims somewhat." Benjamin Svetkey, also from Entertainment Weekly, describes the series as a "shockingly wholesome new drama" from Steven Bochco. Svetkey quotes Bochco describing the series, "We're not pushing the envelope. We're just doing a show about how families wire up to each other in the 1990s." Jerry Schwartz of the Associated Press describes the series as "an archipelago in a sea of earnestness" that does have "an occasionally quirky sense of humor." Scott D. Pierce of Deseret News describes the series as "a quality hour drama about a family. It is far from a perfect family, but it is an engaging one." He cautions that parents may want to screen this for their younger children but then goes on to say "'Byrds of Paradise is the sort of family show viewers have been insisting they want to see."

== Episodes ==
| No. | Title | Directed by | Written by | Original release date | Prod. code |
|---|---|---|---|---|---|
| 1 | "Pilot" | Bradley Silberling | Charles H. Eglee & Channing Gibson | March 3, 1994 | OP01 |
| 2 | "The Nenes Have It" | Joe Ann Fogle | Nick Harding | March 10, 1994 | OP02 |
| 3 | "Moon, Man" | Stephen Cragg | Charles H. Eglee & Channing Gibson | March 17, 1994 | OP03 |
| 4 | "This Band is My Band" | Dennis Dugan | Nick Harding | March 24, 1994 | OP04 |
| 5 | "The Secret Life of Underpants" | Oz Scott | Grace McKeaney | March 31, 1994 | OP05 |
| 6 | "In Todd We Trust" | John Fleckenstein | Nick Harding | April 7, 1994 | OP06 |
| 7 | "Mi Casa es Tsunami" | Félix Enríquez Alcalá | Story by : Nick Harding & Channing Gibson & Charles H. Eglee; Teleplay by : Jon Harmon Feldman | April 14, 1994 | OP07 |
| 8 | "The Bottle Show" | Mark Horowitz | Charles H. Eglee & Channing Gibson | April 21, 1994 | OP08 |
| 9 | "Back in the Saddle" | Daniel Attias | Story by : Channing Gibson & Charles H. Eglee; Teleplay by : Nick Harding | April 28, 1994 | OP09 |
| 10 | "Kimo the Magnificent" | Charles Haid | Charles H. Eglee & Channing Gibson | May 5, 1994 | OP10 |
| 11 | "Hair Today, Gone to Maui" | Dennis Dugan | Elaine Aronson | June 16, 1994 | OP11 |
| 12 | "He Hawai'i Kakou I Ka Pu'uwai" | Joe Ann Fogle | Charles H. Eglee & Channing Gibson | June 23, 1994 | OP13 |
| 13 | "Da Play's Da T'ing" "Twelfth Night o' Whatevah" | TBD | Nick Harding | Unaired | OP12 |
