= Martha Hillier =

British screenwriter

Martha Hillier is a British screenwriter, best known for her work on ITV's Vera and as the showrunner (from series 4) of the BBC's and Netflix's The Last Kingdom, based on the novels of Bernard Cornwell.

== Recent events ==
In 2024 it was announced that Hillier was one of the writers invited to pitch ideas to Warner Bros for the upcoming Harry Potter television series to be released on streaming service Max. She has also been signed to write the first part of a television series about the establishment of the Grimaldi dynasty and their conquest of Monaco.
