= William M. Finkelstein =

American writer, director, actor (b. 1952)

- Born: January 1, 1952 (age 73); New York City, New York, United States
- Occupations: Screenwriter, television producer, actor, television director
- Years active: 1988–present

William M. Finkelstein is an American screenwriter, television producer, actor and television director.

He has worked as a writer and producer on Law & Order, Brooklyn South, Murder One, L.A. Law, Cop Rock, NYPD Blue, and The Good Fight. He co-created Brooklyn South with frequent collaborators David Milch, Steven Bochco and Bill Clark. He won the Emmy Award for Outstanding Drama Series for L.A. Law in both 1989 and 1990. He was nominated for the award again in 2001 for Law & Order. He has been nominated 4 times for the Emmy Award for Outstanding Writing for a Drama Series. He also wrote the script for Werner Herzog's Bad Lieutenant: Port of Call New Orleans to largely positive acclaim.

== Awards and nominations ==
Year	Awarding body	Category	Result	Work	Notes
2001	Emmy Award	Outstanding Drama Series	Nominated	Law & Order	Shared with fellow producers Dick Wolf, Barry Schindel, Jeffrey M. Hayes, Arthur Penn, Kathy McCormick, Lewis Gould, Richard Sweren, Arthur W. Forney, William N. Fordes, Lynn Mamet, Kati Johnston and Gary Karr
1999	Edgar Award	Best Television Episode	Nominated	Brooklyn South episode "Skel in a Cell"	Shared with co-writers Doug Palau, Nicholas Wootton, Stephen Bochco, David Milch and Bill Clark
1999	Edgar Award	Best Television Episode	Nominated	Brooklyn South episode "Fools Russian"	Shared with co-writers Scott A. Williams, Matt Olmstead, Allen Edwards, Stephen Bochco, David Milch and Bill Clark
1990	Emmy Award	Outstanding Drama Series	Won	L.A. Law	Shared with fellow producers David E. Kelley, Rick Wallace, Elodie Keene, Michael M. Robin, Alice West, Robin Breech
1990	Emmy Award	Outstanding Writing for a Drama Series	Nominated	L.A. Law episode "Bang... Zoom... Zap"	Shared with co-writer David E. Kelley
1990	Edgar Award	Best Television Episode	Nominated	L.A. Law episode "Urine Trouble Now"	Shared with co-writers David E. Kelley, Michelle Gallery and Judith Parker
1989	Emmy Award	Outstanding Drama Series	Won	L.A. Law	Shared with fellow producers Steven Bochco, Rick Wallace, David E. Kelley, Scott D. Goldstein, Michelle Gallery, Judith Parker, Phillip M. Goldfarb and Alice West
1989	Emmy Award	Outstanding Writing for a Drama Series	Nominated	L.A. Law episode "His Suit is Hirsute"	Shared with co-writers Steven Bochco, David E. Kelley and Michele Gallery
1989	Emmy Award	Outstanding Writing for a Drama Series	Nominated	L.A. Law episode "Urine Trouble Now"	Shared with co-writers David E. Kelley, Michelle Gallery and Judith Parker
1987	Emmy Award	Outstanding Writing for a Drama Series	Nominated	L.A. Law episode "Sidney, the Dead-Nosed Reindeer"	
