= David Milch =

American TV writer and producer (born 1945)

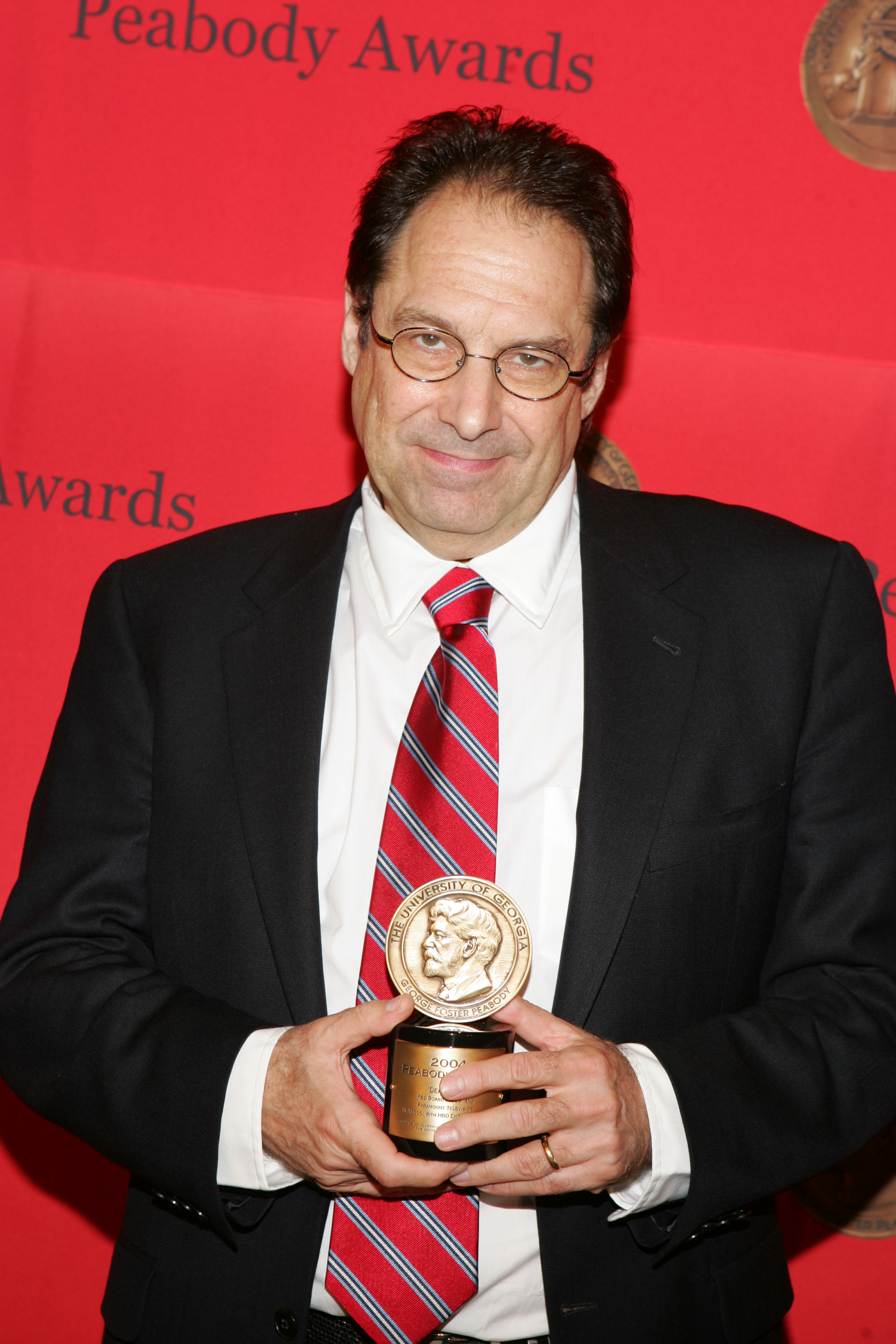
- David Milch at the 64th Annual Peabody Awards in 2005
- Born: David Sanford Milch; March 23, 1945 (age 81); Buffalo, New York, U.S.
- Education: Yale University (BA); University of Iowa (MFA)
- Occupations: Screenwriter, television producer
- Spouse: Rita Stern (m. 1982)
- Children: 3

David Sanford Milch (born March 23, 1945) is an American writer and producer of television series. He has created several television shows, including ABC's NYPD Blue (1993–2005), co-created with Steven Bochco, and HBO's Deadwood (2004–2006, 2019).

== Early life and education ==
Milch graduated with a B.A. summa cum laude from Yale University, where he won the Tinker Prize in English, was elected to Phi Beta Kappa, and was a member of the Delta Kappa Epsilon chapter, along with future US President George W. Bush. Milch earned a Master of Fine Arts with distinction from the Iowa Writers' Workshop at the University of Iowa.

To avoid the draft during the Vietnam War, Milch enrolled in Yale Law School, but he was expelled for allegedly shooting out a police car siren with a shotgun.

== Career ==
Milch worked as a writing teacher and lecturer in English literature at Yale. During his teaching career, he assisted Robert Penn Warren and Cleanth Brooks in the writing of several college textbooks on literature. Milch's poetry and fiction have been published in The Atlantic Monthly and the Southern Review.

In 1982, Milch wrote a script for Hill Street Blues, which became the episode "Trial by Fury". This began his career in television. He worked five seasons on Hill Street Blues as executive story editor and then as executive producer. Milch earned two Writers Guild Awards, a Humanitas prize, and a Primetime Emmy Award while working on that show.

Milch created NYPD Blue with Steven Bochco and served as executive producer of that series for seven seasons. He received three Primetime Emmy Awards during his time with the series. In a 1994 seminar on "Human Values in Entertainment Writing: The Challenges and the Pitfalls," Milch described his affinity for the show's character Detective Andy Sipowicz by noting, "I'm racist." He also recalled a writing workshop he led some years earlier, noting that "None of the black writing was any good," adding: "Jews tend to do very well in this business . . . because Jews experience a typical emotional doubleness in relation to the dominant culture, which is that they are both inside and outside it . . . A black person has to experience more anger and self-division in order to achieve the kind of emotional neutrality that you need to write about the culture." Milch explained in a later statement that "The seminar I gave was an attempt to describe the process of writing and not a statement of political or social values." In response to Milch's comments, David Mills (an American journalist, writer and TV producer) wrote a letter in which he challenged Milch's assumptions concerning black writers. As a result, Milch hired Mills as a writer for NYPD Blue.

Milch co-created the patrol police drama Brooklyn South with Bochco, Bill Clark, and William M. Finkelstein in 1997 while still working on NYPD Blue. After NYPD Blue, Milch created a CBS series called Big Apple.

From 2004 to 2006, Milch produced Deadwood, a dramatic series for HBO. Milch served as creator, writer, and executive producer. The series received critical acclaim and garnered Milch two Primetime Emmy Award nominations for writing and producing. The series ended in 2006 after three seasons. There were plans for two feature-length movies to conclude the series, ultimately resulting in a single film released by HBO in 2019. Actor Ian McShane presented David Milch with the 2006 Outstanding Television Writer Award at the Austin Film Festival.

Milch began production in 2006 on John from Cincinnati, another dramatic series for HBO. The series was canceled after its first season. Initial ratings had been lower than expected but increased steadily. Ratings for the final episode were more than 3 million. In October 2007, HBO renewed its contract with Milch. A pilot was commissioned for Last of the Ninth, "a drama set in the New York Police Department during the 1970s, when the Knapp Commission was formed to ferret out corruption in the force." Collaborating with Milch on Last of the Ninth was former NYPD Blue writer and friend Bill Clark. In December 2008, The Hollywood Reporter stated that Last of the Ninth would not be picked up by the network.

In January 2010, Milch announced that he was developing a new drama for HBO entitled Luck, based around the culture of horse racing. Michael Mann directed the pilot and Dustin Hoffman was cast in the lead role. HBO picked up the series on July 14, 2010. The series ceased production after three horse deaths on set, having aired one season. Other unrealized projects of Milch's during the early 2010s included a film adaptation of Quantic Dream's 2010 video game Heavy Rain, a reunion with NYPD Blue collaborator Steven Bochco on an NBC legal drama, and a series of films and television series for HBO based on the literary works of William Faulkner. In July 2013 HBO announced at the Television Critics Association Press Tour that Milch was developing a new series for the cable network tentatively titled The Money. The show would depict a dynastic New York media family. Irish actor Brendan Gleeson was cast in the lead role as a family patriarch and media mogul. It was announced on March 4, 2014, that HBO had passed on the project.

On April 20, 2017, Ian McShane announced that Milch had submitted a script for a two-hour Deadwood movie to HBO. "[A] two-hour movie script has been delivered to HBO. If they don't deliver [a finished product], blame them." McShane said he had spoken to Milch about the script and hoped to soon discuss beginning the film. He also said of the original cast returning that "we'd all love to do it ... It would be nice to see all of the old gang again." Deadwood: The Movie began production in October 2018 and premiered in May 2019. The film received critical acclaim and a nomination for the Primetime Emmy Award for Outstanding Television Movie.

== Personal life ==
Milch is Jewish. He has been married to Rita Stern since 1982. They have three children.

Milch has stated he has bipolar disorder. He developed a heart condition in the 1990s. During the filming of NYPD Blue, he suffered a heart attack while arguing with actor David Caruso over the script.

In the 2000s, he became addicted to gambling and lost much of his fortune.

Milch was diagnosed with Alzheimer's disease in 2015 shortly before beginning work on the script for the Deadwood film. As of 2019, he lives in an assisted-living facility. On September 13, 2022, Milch published a memoir titled Life's Work.

=== Thoroughbred horse racing ===
Milch has been an owner of thoroughbred racehorses. As a co-owner with Mark and Jack Silverman, he won the 1992 Breeders' Cup Juvenile with the colt Gilded Time. Milch owned outright Val Royal who captured the 2001 Breeders' Cup Mile.

== Television credits ==
- Hill Street Blues (1982–87)
- Bay City Blues (1983)
- Beverly Hills Buntz (1987–88) (co-creator, with Jeffrey Lewis)
- Capital News (1990) (co-creator, with Christian Williams)
- L.A. Law (1992)
- NYPD Blue (1993–2005) (co-creator, with Steven Bochco)
- Murder One (1995)
- Brooklyn South (1997–98) (co-creator, with Steven Bochco)
- Total Security (1997) (co-creator, with Steven Bochco, Charles H. Eglee, and Theresa Rebeck)
- Big Apple (2001) (creator)
- Deadwood (2004–06) (creator)
- John from Cincinnati (2007) (co-creator, with Kem Nunn)
- Last of the Ninth (2009) (co-creator, with Bill Clark)
- Luck (2011–12) (creator)
- The Money (2013) (creator)
- True Detective (2019)
- Deadwood: The Movie (2019)

== Bibliography ==
- Milch, David and Clark, Bill. True Blue: The Real Stories Behind NYPD Blue. New York: William Morrow & Co, 1995. ISBN 978-0688140816
- Milch, David. Deadwood: Stories of the black Hills. New York: Bloomsbury USA, 2006. ISBN 978-1596912397
- Milch, David. Life's Work: A Memoir. New York: Random House, 2022. ISBN 978-0525510741

== Awards and nominations ==
Year	Award	Category	Nominated work	Result	Ref.
1983	Primetime Emmy Awards	Outstanding Writing for a Drama Series	Hill Street Blues, "Trial by Fury"	Won	
1983	Primetime Emmy Awards	Outstanding Writing for a Drama Series	Hill Street Blues, "No Body's Perfect"	Nominated	
1983	Primetime Emmy Awards	Outstanding Writing for a Drama Series	Hill Street Blues, "Eugene's Comedy Empire Strikes Back"	Nominated	
1983	Writers Guild of America Awards	Episodic Drama	Hill Street Blues, "Trial by Fury"	Won	
1983	Writers Guild of America Awards	Episodic Drama	Hill Street Blues, "Gung Ho!"	Nominated	
1983	Writers Guild of America Awards	Episodic Drama	Hill Street Blues, "Eugene's Comedy Empire Strikes Back"	Nominated	
1984	Primetime Emmy Awards	Outstanding Writing for a Drama Series	Hill Street Blues, "Doris in Wonderland"	Nominated	
1984	Primetime Emmy Awards	Outstanding Writing for a Drama Series	Hill Street Blues, "Grace Under Pressure"	Nominated	
1984	Writers Guild of America Awards	Episodic Drama	Hill Street Blues, "Grace Under Pressure"	Won	
1984	Writers Guild of America Awards	Episodic Drama	Hill Street Blues, "Death by Kiki"	Nominated	
1984	Writers Guild of America Awards	Episodic Drama	Hill Street Blues, "Parting is Such Sweep Sorrow"	Nominated	
1985	Primetime Emmy Awards	Outstanding Drama Series	Hill Street Blues	Nominated	
1985	Writers Guild of America Awards	Episodic Drama	Hill Street Blues, "Watt a Way to Go"	Nominated	
1986	Primetime Emmy Awards	Outstanding Drama Series	Hill Street Blues	Nominated	
1986	Writers Guild of America Awards	Episodic Drama	Hill Street Blues, "Remembrance of Hits Past"	Nominated	
1987	Primetime Emmy Awards	Outstanding Writing for a Drama Series	Hill Street Blues, "It Ain't Over Till It's Over"	Nominated	
1994	Primetime Emmy Awards	Outstanding Drama Series	NYPD Blue	Nominated	
1994	Primetime Emmy Awards	Outstanding Writing for a Drama Series	NYPD Blue, "Pilot"	Nominated	
1994	Primetime Emmy Awards	Outstanding Writing for a Drama Series	NYPD Blue, "Personal Foul"	Nominated	
1994	Producers Guild of America Awards	Outstanding Producer of Television	NYPD Blue	Won	
1994	Writers Guild of America Awards	Episodic Drama	NYPD Blue, "Pilot"	Nominated	
1994	Edgar Awards	Best Episode in a Television Series	NYPD Blue, "4B or Not 4B"	Won	
1995	Primetime Emmy Awards	Outstanding Drama Series	NYPD Blue	Won	
1995	Primetime Emmy Awards	Outstanding Writing for a Drama Series	NYPD Blue, "Simone Says"	Nominated	
1995	Edgar Awards	Best Episode in a Television Series	NYPD Blue, "Simone Says"	Won	
1996	Primetime Emmy Awards	Outstanding Drama Series	NYPD Blue	Nominated	
1996	Primetime Emmy Awards	Outstanding Writing for a Drama Series	Murder One, "Chapter One"	Nominated	
1996	Writers Guild of America Awards	Episodic Drama	Murder One, "Chapter One"	Nominated	
1997	Primetime Emmy Awards	Outstanding Drama Series	NYPD Blue	Nominated	
1997	Primetime Emmy Awards	Outstanding Writing for a Drama Series	NYPD Blue, "Where's 'Swaldo"	Won	
1998	Primetime Emmy Awards	Outstanding Drama Series	NYPD Blue	Nominated	
1998	Primetime Emmy Awards	Outstanding Writing for a Drama Series	NYPD Blue, "Lost Israel: Part 2"	Won	
1998	Primetime Emmy Awards	Outstanding Writing for a Drama Series	NYPD Blue, "Lost Israel: Part 1"	Nominated	
1999	Primetime Emmy Awards	Outstanding Drama Series	NYPD Blue	Nominated	
1999	Primetime Emmy Awards	Outstanding Writing for a Drama Series	NYPD Blue, "Hearts and Souls"	Nominated	
1999	Writers Guild of America Awards	Laurel Award for TV Writing Achievement		Won	
1999	Edgar Awards	Best Episode in a Television Series	Brooklyn South, "Fools Russian"	Nominated	
1999	Edgar Awards	Best Episode in a Television Series	Brooklyn South, "Skel in a Cell"	Nominated	
2004	Primetime Emmy Awards	Outstanding Writing for a Drama Series	Deadwood, "Deadwood"	Nominated	
2005	Primetime Emmy Awards	Outstanding Drama Series	Deadwood	Nominated	
2005	Writers Guild of America Awards	Dramatic Series	Deadwood	Nominated	
2006	Writers Guild of America Awards	Dramatic Series	Deadwood	Nominated	
2006	Austin Film Festival	Outstanding Television Writer Award		Won	
2019	Primetime Emmy Awards	Outstanding Television Movie	Deadwood: The Movie	Nominated	
2019	Producers Guild of America Awards	Outstanding Producer of Streamed or Televised Movies	Deadwood: The Movie	Nominated	
2019	Writers Guild of America Awards	Long Form – Original	True Detective	Nominated	
2019	TCA Awards	TCA Career Achievement Award		Won	

== Further reading, audio interviews, and videos ==
- An Evening with Acclaimed Writer/Producer David Milch. SAG Foundation. July 13, 2011. (Video: 80-minutes.)
- Davies, Dave & Milch, David (January 25, 2012). "David Milch: Trying His 'Luck' With Horse Racing". Fresh Air.
- Havrilesky, Heather (March 5, 2005). "The man behind 'Deadwood'". Salon. Archived from the original on August 23, 2006.
- Singer, Mark (February 14, 2005). "The Misfit". The New Yorker. Profile of Milch.
- Television's Great Writer (David Milch at MIT). Cambridge, MA. April 20, 2006. Archived from the original on November 2, 2006. (Video: 1:23:15.)
- Singer, Mark (May 27, 2019). "Hello, darkness: the creator of several hit shows has dementia. And some thoughts about that". Profiles. The New Yorker. Vol. 95, no. 14. pp. 24–30. (Note: Online version is titled "David Milch's Third Act".)
