= Nick Harding =

British general practitioner (born 1969)

Nick Harding (born 21 December 1969) is a British general practitioner and Chief Medical Officer at Operose Health.

== Education ==
Harding qualified in medicine from the University of Birmingham in 1994. Before, during and after this time he undertook research in a number of areas which formed a basis for his future interest in continuous improvement of quality and safety in clinical settings.

== Career ==
Harding has worked in inner-city Birmingham for more than 30 years. As a general practitioner and a medical educator, Harding has been an RCGP examiner and trainer for many years, involved in assessing national standards for general practice. He has held a number of national roles, including Senior Clinical Advisor to NHS England and NHS Improvement for RightCare and Integrated Care, a member of the Health Education Advisory Group, member of the Nuffield Trust Leadership Panel and co-chair of the Specialised Commissioning task force. He was a member of the General Advisory Panel for the King's Fund and is Chair elect for the Royal Society of Public Health (September 2025).

He has had a number of regional roles including being a member of the West Midlands Clinical Senate and was the appointed doctor to the Birmingham Crematorium from 1999 to 2018.

In 2015, he created and sourced funding from Health Education West Midlands to support delivery of a new type of Primary Care Leadership development programme for future GP leaders. More than 120 GPs successfully completed this one-year programme. This programme has been positively evaluated, and has been picked up nationally and implemented across England as the 'Next Generation GP' leadership programme. This has had several thousand participants in 5 years, with further programmes planned using resource support from NHS England and other organisations. Learning from the programme has been featured in a range of publications and podcasts, including a 2017 paper in Innovait, an RCGP journal aimed predominantly at GP trainees.

Harding has published a range of clinical papers on radiation safety, application of cost-benefit analysis, patient communication, and on the threat of measles for the British Journal of General Practice.

=== Commissioning role ===
Harding was the Chair of the Sandwell and West Birmingham Clinical Commissioning Group (CCG), which covers two local authority areas: the whole borough of Sandwell and the western part of the City of Birmingham. The CCG is a membership organisation involving 99 GP practices serving around 547,400 patients across the area. It is broken down further into five Local Commissioning Groups – Black Country, Healthworks, ICoF, Pioneers for Health and Sandwell Health Alliance – that address the needs of the population on a local level. The CCG has won Health Service Journal CCG of the Year 2013 and 2015; and General Practice Commissioners of the Year 2014. It was rated as outstanding under NHS England's Improvement and Assessment Framework in 2016.

=== Modality Partnership ===
Harding was a founding partner in Modality Partnership (formerly known as Vitality), which brings together 49 practices for almost 460,000 patients as of 2025. The partnership has invested in technology so that patients are supported with advice from their healthcare team in a range of ways, including online, over the phone, on their mobile or by Skype.

This new type of super-partnership was referred to in the Kings Fund & Nuffield Trust's reviews of potential primary care models for the future. In 2015, Vitality was one of the vanguards of a new model of care, called multispecialty community providers. The partnership has worked to improve primary care integration and at-scale quality of care in general practice, and it is widening this local model for integration with community, mental health and social care services. Professor Harding continues to retain his clinical practice.

=== Operose Health ===
Harding joined Operose Health as Chief Medical Officer, his current role, in August 2019. The company delivers primary care through its network of GP practices, Primary Care Hubs, ED Streaming Services and Urgent Care Services. He has overseen growth of Operose Health to cover 700,000 patients at 82 sites as of January 2025.

== Honours ==
Harding was recognised with a Queen's award OBE in June 2015 for services to primary care, and was awarded an honorary professorship from Aston University for his work in helping to establish the Aston Medical School. He was also named in the Health Service Journal top 100 clinical leaders of 2015, 2016 and 2017. He has an honorary Membership of the Faculty of Public Health and an honorary Fellowship of the Royal College of Physicians (June 2016). He holds Fellowship of the Royal Society of Public Health and is a trustee.

== Personal life and influences ==
Harding has supported charity work in Malawi, working with local communities to improve health through education and sustained development. He attributes his interest in public health, patient safety and the provision of quality healthcare to his parents and grandfather, all of whom were in the medical profession. Harding's grandfather, Dr Colin Starkie, was the director of public health for Kidderminster and worked with political leaders to introduce the Clean Air Act 1956. His father, Dr Keith Harding, founded the Nuclear Medicine Department at Birmingham City Hospital in 1973.

Harding has written a book on playing the guitar.
