= Steven Bochco =

American television writer and producer (1943–2018)

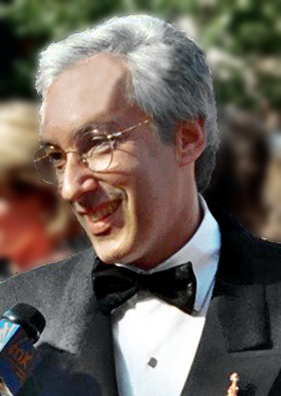
- Bochco in 1994
- Born: Steven Ronald Bochco; December 16, 1943; New York City, U.S.
- Died: April 1, 2018 (aged 74); Los Angeles, California, U.S.
- Education: Carnegie Mellon University (BFA)
- Occupations: Television producer, writer
- Years active: 1961–2016
- Spouses: Gabrielle Levin (m. 1964; div. 1969) Barbara Bosson (m. 1970; div. 1997) Dayna Kalins (m. 2000)
- Children: 3, including Jesse
- Relatives: Joanna Frank (sister)

Steven Ronald Bochco (December 16, 1943 – April 1, 2018) was an American television writer and producer. He developed a number of television series, mostly crime dramas, including Hill Street Blues; L.A. Law; Doogie Howser, M.D.; Cop Rock; and NYPD Blue.

== Early life ==
Bochco was born to a Jewish family in New York City, the son of Mimi, a painter, and Rudolph Bochco, a concert violinist and Polish immigrant. He was educated in Manhattan at the High School of Music and Art. His elder sister is actress Joanna Frank.

In 1961, he enrolled at Carnegie Institute of Technology (now known as Carnegie Mellon University after merging with the Mellon Institute in 1967) in Pittsburgh to study playwriting and theater. He graduated with a Bachelor of Fine Arts (BFA) in Theater in 1966, having also had an MCA Writing Fellowship.

== Career ==
Bochco went to work for Universal Pictures' television division as a writer and then story editor on Ironside, Columbo, McMillan & Wife, and the short-lived Lorne Greene and Ben Murphy series Griff, as well as Delvecchio and The Invisible Man.

He wrote the story and teleplay for the Columbo episode "Murder by the Book" (1971), and the teleplays for several other episodes. He wrote the screenplay for the 1968 film The Counterfeit Killer and worked on Silent Running (1972) and Double Indemnity (1973). He left Universal in 1978 to go to MTM Enterprises where he had greater scope for producing. His first effort there was the short-lived CBS police drama Paris, notable as the first series on which James Earl Jones played a lead role.

He achieved major success for NBC with the police drama Hill Street Blues. It ran from 1981 to 1987 and Bochco was credited as co-creator along with Michael Kozoll, also writing and producing. The series also garnered considerable critical acclaim and many awards, and was nominated for a total of 98 Emmy Awards throughout its run. Bochco was fired from MTM in 1985 following the failure of Bay City Blues (1983).

Bochco moved to 20th Century Fox where he co-created and produced L.A. Law (1986–94) which aired on NBC. This series was also widely acclaimed and a regular award winner. In 1987, Bochco co-created the half-hour dramedy Hooperman which starred John Ritter but was canceled after two seasons, despite Bochco offering to take over direct day-to-day control of a third season. Hooperman was part of a lucrative deal with ABC in 1987 to create and produce ten new television series, which prompted Bochco to form Steven Bochco Productions. (Note: An animated photograph of Bochco's own father, violinist Rudolph Bochco, served as the logo for Steven Bochco Productions; the music played over both the animated photograph and the 20th Century Fox logo was a brief segment from Movement 3, the "Presto" movement, of Concerto No. 2 in G minor, Op. 8, RV 315, "L'estate", the "Summer" concerto of Antonio Vivaldi's cycle The Four Seasons.) That year, Bochco was in final talks with an exclusive agreement with CBS or ABC, and ABC reportedly being the winning bid. From this deal came Doogie Howser, M.D. (1989–93) and Cop Rock (1990). The latter combined straight police drama with live-action Broadway singing and dancing, and was one of his highest-profile failures. In 1992, Bochco created an animated television series, Capitol Critters, along with Nat Mauldin and Michael Wagner.

After a lull, Bochco co-created NYPD Blue (1993–2005) with David Milch. Initially controversial at the time, the series was created with the express intention of changing the nature of network one-hour drama to compete with the more adult fare broadcast on cable networks. The spring 1994 television schedule on ABC presented the only run of a television series executive produced by Bochco, The Byrds of Paradise. The series showcased a plot structure that was an early forerunner in presenting a more realistic, and not idealized, representation of character development in the prime time television format, but it aired for only one season, and has yet to be re-aired on television. Although The Byrds of Paradise achieved significant critical acclaim during its initial run, and helped launch the careers of actors Seth Green and Jennifer Love Hewitt, the show has never received an official release on any home video format or streaming media platform. Other projects in this period that failed to take off include Murder One (1995–97), Brooklyn South (1997), City of Angels (2000), Philly (2001), and Over There (2005). All five shows failed to match Bochco's earlier success though Murder One and Over There garnered critical praise. In 1995, he had a contract with CBS to air the network's future programs, and had to distribute the shows worldwide. In 1999, he moved to Paramount Television where he remained until 2005. Shortly afterwards, he was moved to ABC's corporate subsidiary Touchstone Television later in 2005.

In 2005, Bochco took charge of Commander in Chief (2005–06), created by Rod Lurie, and brought in a new writing team. However, in spring 2006, he left the show because of conflicts with ABC, and shortly afterward the program was canceled. Bochco described his experience on the show as "horrible". In 2006 Bochco produced a pilot for an ABC show, Hollis & Rae, and was reported at the same time to be developing a baseball drama and another legal drama for ABC in partnership with Chris Gerolmo.

It was announced in March 2007 that Bochco had taken his first steps into internet TV with the 44-episode Cafe Confidential, each episode being 60-seconds of unscripted "confessions" by members of the public. Yet another legal drama titled Raising the Bar was produced for TNT, this time in partnership with David Feige, although it was cancelled in December 2009 during the second season.

According to an interview with Bochco published in September 2007, he was winding down his involvement with network television, feeling that his tastes and current fashions in TV drama no longer coincide. "The network executives stay the same age and I keep getting older and it creates a different kind of relationship. When I was doing my stuff at NBC with Brandon [Tartikoff] and Hill Street, we were contemporaries," says Bochco. "When I sit down [now], they're sitting in a room with someone who's old enough to be their father and I'm not sure they want to sit in a room with their fathers."

In 2008, Bochco argued that the new home for quality prime time drama is cable, where "the atmosphere is far friendlier and the creative environment more conducive to doing original work", and that "most of what's passing for primetime drama these days isn't very good".

Prior to Hill Street Blues it was rare for American straight drama series to have story arcs, i.e. several stories running over many episodes (with the exception of prime time soap operas such as Dallas). It was also rare to have a large regular cast. The structure of the modern "ensemble" television drama can be traced to Bochco, who many regard as having changed the "language" of television drama.

From 2014 to its cancellation in 2016, he wrote and executive produced Murder in the First, a series drama which he co-created with Eric Lodal.

== Personal life ==
Bochco was married three times: to Gabrielle Levin from 1964 to their divorce in 1969, to actress Barbara Bosson from 1970 to their divorce in 1997, and to television producer and executive Dayna Kalins from 2000 until his death. Bochco had three children. His son, Jesse Bochco, with Bosson, is a producer/director who directed several episodes of his father's shows, including NYPD Blue, Philly, and Over There. As a child, son Jesse played the son of his real mother's character on one episode of Hill Street Blues.

At the time of his death, Bochco lived in the Pacific Palisades neighborhood of Los Angeles.

=== Health and death ===
Bochco was diagnosed with leukemia in 2014, requiring a bone marrow transplant later that year. He died from the disease at his home on April 1, 2018, at age 74.

== Filmography ==
Pre–Steven Bochco Productions
Title	Genre	First air date	Last air date	No. of seasons	Network
The Bold Ones: The New Doctors	Medical drama	September 14, 1969	May 4, 1973	4	NBC
Richie Brockelman, Private Eye	Drama	March 17, 1978	April 14, 1978	1	NBC
Paris	Drama	September 29, 1979	January 15, 1980	1	CBS
Hill Street Blues	Drama	January 15, 1981	May 12, 1987	7	NBC
Bay City Blues	Comedy-drama	October 25, 1983	July 8, 1984	1	NBC
L.A. Law	Legal drama	September 15, 1986	May 19, 1994	8	NBC
Hooperman	Comedy-drama	September 23, 1987	July 19, 1989	2	ABC
Steven Bochco Productions
Title	Genre	First air date	Last air date	No. of seasons	Network
Doogie Howser, M.D.	Sitcom	September 19, 1989	March 24, 1993	4	ABC
Cop Rock	Drama	September 26, 1990	December 26, 1990	1	ABC
Capitol Critters	Animated	January 28, 1992	March 14, 1992	1	ABC
NYPD Blue	Drama	September 21, 1993	March 1, 2005	12	ABC
The Byrds of Paradise	Drama	March 3, 1994	June 23, 1994	1	ABC
Murder One	Drama	September 19, 1995	May 29, 1997	2	ABC
Public Morals	Sitcom	October 30, 1996	October 30, 1996	1	CBS
Total Security	Drama	September 27, 1997	November 8, 1997	1	ABC
Brooklyn South	Drama	September 22, 1997	April 28, 1998	1	CBS
City of Angels	Drama	January 16, 2000	December 21, 2000	2	CBS
Philly	Drama	September 25, 2001	May 28, 2002	1	ABC
Blind Justice	Drama	March 8, 2005	June 21, 2005	1	ABC
Over There	Drama	July 27, 2005	October 26, 2005	1	FX
Raising the Bar	Drama	September 1, 2008	December 24, 2009	2	TNT
Murder in the First	Drama	June 9, 2014	September 4, 2016	3	TNT

== Awards ==
Year	Award	Category	Work	Result
1981	Emmy Awards	Outstanding Drama Series	Hill Street Blues	Won
1981	Emmy Awards	Outstanding Writing in a Drama Series	Hill Street Blues: "Hill Street Station" (premiere episode)	Won
1981	Humanitas Prize	60-Minute Category	Hill Street Blues	Won
1981	Peabody Awards	Peabody Award	Hill Street Blues	Won
1982	Emmy Awards	Outstanding Drama Series	Hill Street Blues	Won
1982	Emmy Awards	Outstanding Writing in a Drama Series	Hill Street Blues: "Freedom's Last Stand"	Won
1982	Edgar Awards	Edgar Allan Poe Award for Best Episode in a TV Series	Hill Street Blues: "Hill Street Station"	Won
1982	Writers Guild of America Awards	Writers Guild of America Award for Television: Episodic Drama	Hill Street Blues: "Hill Street Station"	Won
1983	Emmy Awards	Outstanding Drama Series	Hill Street Blues	Won
1984	Emmy Awards	Outstanding Drama Series	Hill Street Blues	Won
1985	Writers Guild of America Awards	Writers Guild of America Award for Television: Episodic Drama	Hill Street Blues: "Grace Under Pressure"	Won
1987	Emmy Awards	Outstanding Drama Series	L.A. Law	Won
1987	Emmy Awards	Outstanding Writing in a Drama Series	L.A. Law: "The Venus Butterfly"	Won
1987	Peabody Awards	Peabody Award	L.A. Law	Won
1989	Emmy Awards	Outstanding Drama Series	L.A. Law	Won
1990	Emmy Awards		L.A. Law	Won
1994	Producers Guild of America Awards	Outstanding Producer of Television	NYPD Blue	Won
1994	Writers Guild of America Awards	Laurel Award for TV Writing Achievement	Bochco's overall career	Won
1995	Emmy Awards	Outstanding Drama Series	NYPD Blue	Won
1995	Edgar Awards	Edgar Allan Poe Award for Best Episode in a TV Series	NYPD Blue: "Simone Says"	Won
1996	Peabody Awards	Peabody Award	NYPD Blue	Won
1996	Television Hall of Fame	Television Hall of Fame induction	Bochco's overall career	Won
1998	Peabody Awards	Peabody Award	NYPD Blue: "Raging Bulls"	Won
1999	Humanitas Prize	60-Minute Category	NYPD Blue	Won
1999	Directors Guild of America Awards	Diversity Award	Bochco's overall career	Won
1999	Producers Guild of America Awards	Lifetime Achievement Award	Bochco's overall career	Won

== Books ==
- Death by Hollywood: A Novel (2003). New York: Random House. ISBN 978-1-4000-6156-3.
- Truth is a Total Defense: My Fifty Years in Television (2016). CreateSpace Independent Publishing Platform. ISBN 978-1-5348-3390-6.
