= List of L.A. Law episodes =

L.A. Law is an American television legal drama series that aired on NBC. Created by Steven Bochco and Terry Louise Fisher, it contained many of Bochco's trademark features including an ensemble cast, large number of parallel storylines, social drama, and off-the-wall humor. It reflected the social and cultural ideologies of the 1980s and early 1990s, and many of the cases featured on the show dealt with hot-topic issues such as capital punishment, abortion, racism, gay rights, homophobia, sexual harassment, AIDS, and domestic violence.

The series premiered on September 15, 1986, and ran for eight seasons before airing its final episode on May 19, 1994.

== Series overview ==
All production code information comes from the U.S. Copyright Office, a division of The Library of Congress.

Season	Episodes	Originally released	
Season	Episodes	First released	Last released
1	23	September 15, 1986	April 9, 1987
2	20	October 15, 1987	May 5, 1988
3	19	November 3, 1988	May 18, 1989
4	22	November 2, 1989	May 17, 1990
5	22	October 18, 1990	May 16, 1991
6	22	October 10, 1991	May 21, 1992
7	22	October 22, 1992	May 27, 1993
8	22	October 7, 1993	May 19, 1994

== Episodes ==
=== Season 1 (1986–87) ===
No. overall	No. in season	Title	Directed by	Written by	Original release date	Prod. code	Rating/share (households)
1	1	"L.A. Law"	Gregory Hoblit	Steven Bochco & Terry Louise Fisher	September 15, 1986	4L01	21.2/33
2	2	"L.A. Law"	Gregory Hoblit	Steven Bochco & Terry Louise Fisher	September 15, 1986	4L02	21.2/33
Firm partner Norman Chaney is found dead in his office. Arnie (Corbin Bernsen) takes advantage of a woman by baiting her with shocking pictures of her husband during a divorce case. Michael (Harry Hamlin) defends a wealthy man accused of rape. Ann (Jill Eikenberry) disagrees with a pro bono case. New associate Victor Sifuentes (Jimmy Smits) joins the firm. The firm is shocked by revelations at Norman's funeral.
3	3	"Those Lips, That Eye"	Gregory Hoblit	Steven Bochco & Terry Louise Fisher	October 3, 1986	4L03	17.0/29
Michael develops romantic feelings for deputy D.A. Grace Van Owen (Susan Dey), and decides to pursue her. Ann is taken to task by Douglas (Alan Rachins) and Leland (Richard Dysart) for refusing a large insurance settlement. Just as she files for divorce from her abusive husband, Abby (Michele Greene) is promoted from law clerk to junior associate.
4	4	"The House of the Rising Flan"	E. W. Swackhamer	Story by : Les Carter & Susan Sisko; Teleplay by : Steven Bochco & Terry Louise Fisher & Jacob Epstein	October 10, 1986	4L04	14.7/25
Michael defends a child in a personal-injury suit, not knowing the case is a sham. Stuart (Michael Tucker) fears his career may be in jeopardy after he refuses to set up an alcoholic IRS agent. Abby's son is kidnapped by her estranged husband.
5	5	"The Princess and the Wiener King"	Sharron Miller	Jacob Epstein	October 17, 1986	4L05	14.8/26
Victor defends a young girl who murdered her brother after years of abuse. A client does not listen to Arnie's advice about his case. Grace reveals her true feelings to Michael.
6	6	"Simian Chanted Evening"	Rick Wallace	Story by : Allison Hock; Teleplay by : Steven Bochco & Terry Louise Fisher & David E. Kelley	October 24, 1986	4L06	15.9/28
Ann defends a toy manufacturer who is trying to stop a takeover. Leland is less than pleased when Arnie announces his intentions to pursue entertainment law. Michael takes matters into his own hands and decides to interrupt Grace and Kevin's wedding by making a monkey out of himself.
7	7	"Slum Enchanted Evening"	Ben Bolt	Marshall Goldberg	October 31, 1986	4L07	15.6/28
Grace has to deal with the consequences of walking out on her wedding. Douglas decides to face off against Leland in a board meeting. Former associate Andrew Taylor (Mario Van Peebles) goes up against Douglas in court.
8	8	"Raiders of the Lost Bark"	Jan Eliasberg	David E. Kelley	November 7, 1986	4L08	16.1/28
Michael is shocked when his client turns down a large settlement in a losing case. Victor takes on a losing case of his own, with unexpected results.
9	9	"Gibbon Take"	Sharron Miller	John Schulian	November 14, 1986	4L09	15.1/26
Grace is doubly humiliated when her ex-fiancé decides to get revenge on her and she is involved in a case of mistaken identity. When Arnie transforms Abby into an aggressive divorce attorney, her personal problems interfere with her latest case.
10	10	"The Venus Butterfly"	Donald Petrie	Steven Bochco & Terry Louise Fisher	November 21, 1986	4L10	15.9/27
Grace prosecutes Christopher Appleton, a gay man with AIDS charged with the mercy killing of his lover, who also had the disease. Norman's old office is up for grabs, causing petty friction amongst the partners. Stuart's client, a bigamist, shares his sexual technique, "The Venus Butterfly", and Stuart is eager to share it with Ann.
11	11	"Fry Me to the Moon"	Janet Greek	Jacob Epstein & David E. Kelley & Marshall Goldberg	December 4, 1986	4L11	17.1/28
Arnie's parents drag him into the middle of their messy divorce. The stress of his latest case starts to take its toll on Michael. Grace uncovers new information that affects the outcome of her murder case. Victor decides to quit after Leland ruins his latest case for fear of bad publicity for the firm. Special guest star: Jeanne Cooper, the real-life mother of Corbin Bernsen, guest stars as Arnie's mother, Gladys Becker.
12	12	"El Sid"	Allan Arkush	Jacob Epstein & Marshall Goldberg & David E. Kelley	December 11, 1986	4L12	19.9/32
Grace is reprimanded for her role in the Appleton case. Victor returns to the firm after Leland admits his mistakes.
13	13	"Sidney, the Dead-Nosed Reindeer"	Jonathan Sanger	William M. Finkelstein	December 18, 1986	4L13	18.8/31
Michael is traumatized by a violent act in the courtroom during a case. Abby is finally reunited with her son.
14	14	"Prince Kuzak in a Can"	Rick Wallace	Jacob Epstein & David E. Kelley	January 8, 1987	4L14	17.0/27
Under tremendous stress and pressure following recent events, Michael starts lashing out at Grace and his colleagues. Victor represents a teenager who is a whiz at computer-fraud.
15	15	"The Douglas Fur Ball"	Donald Petrie	William M. Finkelstein	January 15, 1987	4L15	17.8/29
After his infidelity, Douglas's wife, Sheila Brackman, files for divorce and chooses former McKenzie Brackman law clerk Lisa Weston to represent her. Stuart and Ann hit a rough patch in their new relationship when he accuses her of having an affair with a client. Lisa confronts Arnie over his dishonesty. Guest star: Joanna Frank
16	16	"December Bribe"	Janet Greek	John Jay Osborn Jr.	January 22, 1987	4L16	19.1/30
Michael and Grace's high pressure careers interfere with their relationship. Arnie manipulates his clients in order to get something he wants. The partners contemplate a merger with a New York firm. Abby tries her first case, with disastrous results.
17	17	"Beef Jerky"	Helaine Head	Jacob Epstein and David E. Kelley	February 5, 1987	4L17	18.8/30
Grace prosecutes a defendant who is accused of stealing bull semen. Victor and Abby team up in court to represent a family who lost a member in a car accident. Arnie uses an explicit videotape to goad a client (Patricia Wettig) into a bigger settlement.
18	18	"Becker on the Rox"	Rick Wallace	William M. Finkelstein	February 12, 1987	4L18	18.3/30
When Arnie refuses to give her a well-deserved raise, Roxanne (Susan Ruttan) quits. Michael has to compromise his image in order to represent a major pharmaceutical company. Victor helps both Michael and Abby with their respective cases. Larry Drake appears for the first time as Benny Stulwicz.
19	19	"Fifty Ways to Floss Your Lover"	Mimi Leder	Story by : Steven Bochco & Terry Louise Fisher; Teleplay by : Jacob Epstein & David E. Kelley	February 19, 1987	4L19	20.7/32
Grace is shot in the courthouse after a winning verdict against a gang member. Arnie caves in to Roxanne's demands.
20	20	"The Grace of Wrath"	Helaine Head	Story by : Steven Bochco & Terry Louise Fisher; Teleplay by : William M. Finkelstein	February 26, 1987	4L20	22.0/34
Grace returns to work following the shooting and the teenager who shot her is put on trial. Douglas is tempted to buy a toupee.
21	21	"Sparky Brackman RIP ?-1987"	Paul Schneider	Story by : Steven Bochco & Terry Louise Fisher; Teleplay by : Jacob Epstein & David E. Kelley	March 26, 1987	4L21	18.0/30
Michael represents a young woman claiming rape. Douglas is impressed when Abby represents him in a case against his neighbor. Ann has second thoughts about moving in with Stuart.
22	22	"Oy Vey! Wilderness!"	Mimi Leder	Story by : Steven Bochco & Terry Louise Fisher; Teleplay by : William M. Finkelstein	April 2, 1987	4L22	18.3/30
Stuart and Michael team up in a case against the IRS. Grace finally decides to take time off to deal with the recent traumatic events in her life. Roxanne is swept off her feet by one of Arnie's clients.
23	23	"Pigmalion"	Shelley Levinson	Story by : Steven Bochco & Terry Louise Fisher; Teleplay by : Jacob Epstein & David E. Kelley	April 9, 1987	4L23	19.0/31
Victor has doubts about his latest case. Grace returns home after taking a break from work and her relationship with Michael. Ann and Stuart become engaged.

=== Season 2 (1987–88) ===
No. overall	No. in season	Title	Directed by	Written by	Original release date	Prod. code	Rating/share (households)
24	1	"The Lung Goodbye"	John Pasquin	Tony Schwartz	October 15, 1987	5K05	20.2/35
Michael goes up against a tobacco company in court. Arnie represents a house husband (Antony Hamilton) who is suing his TV-star wife (Shannon Tweed).
25	2	"The Wizard of Odds"	Gregory Hoblit	David E. Kelley	October 22, 1987	5K01	16.9/29
The power of becoming a judge goes to Douglas's head. Leland hires young attorney Jonathan Rollins (Blair Underwood) as a new associate. Arnie is the prize at a bachelor auction.
26	3	"Cannon of Ethics"	John Patterson	Jacob Epstein	October 29, 1987	5K02	21.0/31
A former district attorney betrays Ann's trust. Abby convinces Douglas to hire her former client, Benny Stulwicz, as the firm's messenger. Arnie's latest girlfriend is looking for much more commitment than he is willing to give.
27	4	"Brackman Vasektimized"	Anson Williams	Robert Cochran	November 5, 1987	5K03	18.7/32
Grace hits the roof when Michael's ex-wife (Tovah Feldshuh) blows back into town. Abby's plan to get a raise in salary backfires on her. Douglas starts up an affair with his attractive female bailiff.
28	5	"The Brothers Grimm"	Michael Zinberg	William M. Finkelstein	November 12, 1987	5K04	20.1/33
Victor represents a rape victim who is suing a cop for not stopping the attack on her. Ann and Stuart disagree over the terms of their prenuptial agreement. Benny's mother passes away.
29	6	"Auld L'Anxiety"	Nell Cox	Story by : Steven Bochco & Terry Louise Fisher; Teleplay by : Jacob Epstein & David E. Kelley & William M. Finkelstein	November 19, 1987	5K06	20.3/34
Grace convinces a frightened witness to testify against a murderous gang member and is stunned when the witness is killed in retaliation. Leland tackles an age-discrimination case. The partners are divided over Jonathan's brash style of handling negotiations.
30	7	"Rohner vs. Gradinger"	Sharron Miller	Story by : Steven Bochco & Terry Louise Fisher; Teleplay by : Jacob Epstein & David E. Kelley & William M. Finkelstein	December 3, 1987	5K07	18.7/34
Michael's patience is tested when he represents a despondent client who is losing touch with reality. Jonathan further upsets the partners when he bypasses both Stuart and Leland to keep a client. Stuart meets Ann's anti-Semitic mother. Douglas decides to break off his affair with Rhonda by doing serious damage to her career. Special guest star: Constance Towers
31	8	"Goldilocks and the Three Barristers"	Rick Wallace	Story by : Steven Bochco & Terry Louise Fisher; Teleplay by : David E. Kelley & William M. Finkelstein	December 10, 1987	5K08	18.9/34
Grace goes after three attorneys accused of molesting a stripper. Abby's streak of bad luck begins to change when her latest case brings a windfall to the firm. Arnie bonds with Benny.
32	9	"Divorce with Extreme Prejudice"	Sam Weisman	Joe Cacaci	December 17, 1987	5K09	19.8/34
Grace prosecutes a teenager who is accused of killing his abusive father. When Victor's girlfriend (Finola Hughes) is arrested for the murder of her husband, he gets the case thrown out, but is not convinced that she is totally innocent.
33	10	"Full Marital Jacket"	Win Phelps	Story by : Steven Bochco & Terry Louise Fisher; Teleplay by : Terry Louise Fisher & David E. Kelley	January 7, 1988	5K10	21.6/36
Michael and Arnie try to save Benny from facing sexual assault charges. Abby receives a marriage proposal. Ann and Stuart's wedding takes place, but Douglas's wife Sheila causes a scene.
34	11	"Gorilla My Dreams"	Gabrielle Beaumont	Jacob Epstein & William M. Finkelstein	January 14, 1988	5K11	21.6/36
Arnie's defense of an accused child molester is damaged when the client and his daughter disappear. When Roxanne's boyfriend (Charles Frank) is arrested for insider trading, Abby, Ann and Roxanne herself find themselves in trouble for acting on his tips. Victor takes Benny to the zoo to teach him about the facts of life.
35	12	"Hand Roll Express"	Kim Friedman	William Stadiem	January 21, 1988	5K12	22.0/36
Ignoring Arnie's warnings, Roxanne decides to stand by her accused boyfriend (Charles Frank), until she discovers she is not the only woman in his life. Douglas is arrested for solicitation of a prostitute. Grace decides to become a partner in an old friend's new law firm.
36	13	"Beauty and Obese"	Sam Weisman	Terry Louise Fisher & David E. Kelley	February 11, 1988	5K13	20.5/33
Michael represents a fellow attorney who was fired from her firm for being overweight. Grace discovers that her new law firm is financed by the mob. Stuart finds himself in the center of attention when one of his clients leaves him a multi-million dollar estate in her will. NOTE: This is the last episode in which series co-creator Terry Louise Fisher acted as supervising producer.
37	14	"Pettycoat Injunction"	Alice West	Steven Bochco & David E. Kelley & Jacob Epstein & William M. Finkelstein	February 18, 1988	5K14	17.2/27
Arnie's choice to participate in a sensational civil case could cost him his job. After witnessing a mobster's death, Grace decides to step down and become a homemaker.
38	15	"The Bald Ones"	Tom Moore	Steven Bochco & David E. Kelley & Jacob Epstein & William M. Finkelstein	February 25, 1988	5K15	15.2/23
Douglas discovers that he has yet another half-brother (Jeffrey Tambor). Michael convinces Grace to co-chair with him in his latest case. Abby and Jonathan are at odds over their case. Victor takes on a legendary trial attorney accused of mishandling a workplace death case on behalf of a widow.
39	16	"Fetus Completus"	Helaine Head	Steven Bochco & David E. Kelley & Jacob Epstein & William M. Finkelstein	March 3, 1988	5K16	20.4/34
Ann fights for an unborn child's life despite her personal feelings. Working together puts a strain on Michael and Grace's love life. Arnie represents Douglas in his divorce proceedings.
40	17	"Belle of the Bald"	John Pasquin	Steven Bochco & David E. Kelley & Jacob Epstein & William M. Finkelstein	April 14, 1988	5K17	17.7/30
Michael represents a woman who killed the man who raped her. Grace returns to work as a prosecutor.
41	18	"Open Heart Perjury"	Tom Moore	David E. Kelley & Jacob Epstein & William M. Finkelstein	April 21, 1988	5K18	17.4/29
When Jonathan over-zealously cross-examines a defendant on the stand, the man has a heart attack and dies in the courtroom. Roxanne has her first of many encounters with Dave Meyer (Dann Florek).
42	19	"Leapin' Lizards!"	Michael Zinberg	Steven Bochco, David E. Kelley, Jacob Epstein and William M. Finkelstein	April 28, 1988	5K19	18.2/30
Ann represents a man who wants to continue playing a superhero despite being fired from the role. Roxanne finds herself in major tax trouble due to her dealings with her former boyfriend.
43	20	"Chariots of Meyer"	Win Phelps	David E. Kelley, Jacob Epstein and William M. Finkelstein	May 5, 1988	5K20	20.2/34
James Earl Jones guest stars as a defense attorney who uses the "race card" at every turn against Grace in a murder trial. Roxanne turns to Dave for help out of her financial situation.

=== Season 3 (1988–89) ===
No. overall	No. in season	Title	Directed by	Written by	Original release date	Prod. code	Viewers (millions)
44	1	"Hey, Lick Me Over"	Rick Wallace	Steven Bochco & David E. Kelley	November 3, 1988	7A01	27.6
Grace prosecutes a man (Joe Spano) who can't keep his tongue to himself. Arnie is upset when Roxanne decides to marry Dave Meyer, even though she does not love him. Victor represents a family who is suing a security company after being attacked in their home. Abby thinks her future with the firm is coming to an end after her yearly review brings disastrous results. Guest Stars: Alan Oppenheimer, Dan Hedaya
45	2	"The Son Also Rises"	John Pasquin	David E. Kelley	November 10, 1988	7A02	27.2
Grace is asked to overlook a legal technicality that could free a cop killer. Arnie represents Dave's sister in her divorce proceedings. Stuart accuses Ann of avoiding the fertility doctor. Guest Stars: Rene Auberjonois
46	3	"Romancing the Drone"	Win Phelps	William M. Finkelstein	November 17, 1988	7A03	23.1
Michael represents a client accused of rape. Abby decides to leave the firm and begin her own practice. Roxanne resents Dave's pillow talk and gets unexpected advice from Arnie.
47	4	"Sperminator"	Tom Moore	Michele Gallery	December 1, 1988	7A04	26.2
Stuart tries to increase his fertility by using prescribed drugs. Jonathan and Victor team up in court. Abby's attempt to deal with an irrational client that Douglas referred to her turns deadly.
48	5	"The Princess and the Pee"	Sam Weisman	William M. Finkelstein	December 8, 1988	7A05	27.0
Michael learns that one of his biggest legal rivals (Mitchell Laurance) never passed the bar exam. Ann and Stuart's romance loses its energy.
49	6	"Dummy Dearest"	Ben Bolt	Robert Cochran	December 15, 1988	7A06	27.3
Jonathan defends a deranged ventriloquist (Ronn Lucas) who speaks only through his dummy. Ann's celebrity client is a tabloid magnet.
50	7	"To Live and Diet in L.A."	John Pasquin	Judith Parker	January 5, 1989	7A07	26.9
Grace decides to reveal a legal technicality that could free a cop killer and damage her career in the process. Ann and Stuart enter into a risky adoption agreement. Abby begins seeing Bill Ringstrom (Wayne Northrop), the detective who helped her during the shooting investigation.
51	8	"I'm in the Nude for Love"	Eric Laneuville	David E. Kelley	January 12, 1989	7A08	30.7
Michael represents the owner (Allan Arbus) of a nudist colony whose new celebrity centerfold member (Teri Hatcher) is causing a frenzy amongst agitated neighbors. Benny falls for Allison, the director of Arnie’s video guide to divorce. Joyce Hyser begins a recurring role as Allison Gottlieb.
52	9	"Victor/Victorious"	Win Phelps	David E. Kelley & Michele Gallery & Judith Parker	January 19, 1989	7A09	29.0
Grace faces an old adversary in court. Abby's financial troubles cause her to give poor advice to a client. Victor and Allison begin seeing each other. Special guest star: James Earl Jones
53	10	"The Plane Mutiny"	Sandy Smolan	Steven Bochco & David E. Kelley & William M. Finkelstein	February 9, 1989	7A10	22.4
Arnie doesn't want to share in the profits of his "how-to" divorce video. Douglas is arrested after forcing a passenger jet off the runway. After battling each other in court, Victor is taken aback when Grace kisses him.
54	11	"Izzy Ackerman or Is He Not?"	Sam Weisman	Joe Schulkin & David Berzol & William M. Finkelstein	February 16, 1989	7A11	28.1
Leland tries to help a widow whose husband's body was mistakenly sent to several medical universities. Roxanne is arrested for assault. Grace and Michael discover that Bill is married. Special guest star: Kathleen Freeman
55	12	"The Accidental Jurist"	Jan Eliasberg	Steven Bochco & David E. Kelley & Michele Gallery & Judith Parker	February 23, 1989	7A12	27.5
Michael agrees to pick a retired judge whom he knows to be a closeted homosexual to hear the case of an athlete who loses an endorsement deal after coming out. Ann is torn between an important case and caring for her new baby. Abby ends her affair with Bill.
56	13	"Barstow Bound"	Win Phelps	William M. Finkelstein	March 23, 1989	7A13	27.2
Leland's federal judgeship candidacy has strings attached. Victor represents the family of a construction worker whose death resulted from shoddy workmanship. Arnie's divorce video lands him in hot water with a man whose wife decided to leave him after watching it.
57	14	"Leave It to Geezer"	Phillip M. Goldfarb	Steven Bochco & David E. Kelley & Michele Gallery	March 30, 1989	7A14	23.8
Michael is livid when Leland insists that he take a break and refocus after a series of cases gone wrong. Grace's sympathies are roused by four aged bank robbers and their elderly lawyer.
58	15	"The Unbearable Lightness of Boring"	Sandy Smolan	David E. Kelley & William M. Finkelstein & Michele Gallery	April 6, 1989	7A15	26.6
Douglas quits as managing partner of the firm. Abby represents a ring of drug dealers and their leader (Kiel Martin). Jonathan interviews a beautiful paralegal (Renée Jones). Roxanne files for divorce from Dave.
59	16	"His Suit Is Hirsute"	Win Phelps	David E. Kelley & William M. Finkelstein & Steven Bochco & Michele Gallery	April 27, 1989	7A16	25.0
Ann and Stuart are forced to return their adopted daughter, Kelsey, to her birth mother. Abby is arrested on false charges for her representation of drug dealers. Grace and Michael decide to call it quits.
60	17	"America the Beautiful"	Max Tash	David E. Kelley & William M. Finkelstein & Michele Gallery & Judith Parker	May 4, 1989	7A17	24.9
After Abby successfully defends herself in front of a grand jury, Leland asks her to return to the firm. Dave hits the roof when Arnie announces that he will be representing Roxanne in their divorce proceedings.
61	18	"Urine Trouble Now"	Rob Thompson	David E. Kelley & William M. Finkelstein & Michele Gallery & Judith Parker	May 11, 1989	7A18	24.2
Victor takes on the case of a slandered Mexican beer company. Michael represents an oldies music group in a lawsuit against a new act. Guest stars: Amanda Plummer, Bruce A. Young
62	19	"Consumed Innocent"	Win Phelps	David E. Kelley & William M. Finkelstein & Michele Gallery & Judith Parker	May 18, 1989	7A19	25.8
Grace prosecutes a TV talk show host accused of inciting a murder. An important client insists that Benny stop seeing his mentally challenged daughter. After months of trying, Ann discovers she is pregnant. Guest Stars: Amanda Plummer, J. T. Walsh, Armin Shimerman

=== Season 4 (1989–90) ===
No. overall	No. in season	Title	Directed by	Written by	Original release date	Prod. code	Viewers (millions)
63	1	"The Unsterile Cuckoo"	Rob Thompson	David E. Kelley	November 2, 1989	7D01	28.2
Stuart is left in a tight spot when Ann's lamaze classes and the firm's baseball tournament coincide with each other. Michael decides to buy a motorcycle.
64	2	"Captain Hurt"	Win Phelps	William M. Finkelstein	November 9, 1989	7D02	27.9
Michael defends Earl Williams (guest star Carl Lumbly), a college professor accused of murder who is not being completely honest with him about the facts of the case. Veronica Cartwright begins a recurring role as prosecutor Margaret Flanagan.
65	3	"When Irish Eyes Are Smiling"	David Carson	David E. Kelley and William M. Finkelstein	November 16, 1989	7D03	26.8
Michael puts his client on the stand. Arnie is forced to stop dating a client.
66	4	"The Mouse That Soared"	Sandy Smolan	David E. Kelley and William M. Finkelstein	November 23, 1989	7D04	26.4
Victor opposes a diminutive lawyer (David Rappaport) when he attempts to stop "dwarf-tossing" contests. Michael places his hopes on an unreliable witness.
67	5	"One Rat, One Ranger"	Tom Moore	Douglas McGrath	November 30, 1989	7D05	26.3
Grace debates putting a 6-year-old girl on the stand in a molestation case. Leland and Douglas decide to bring in a "rainmaker" to drum up business for the firm. Diana Muldaur makes her first appearance as Rosalind Shays. Kathy Bates guest stars.
68	6	"Lie Down and Deliver"	Gabrielle Beaumont	Christopher Keyser & Amy Lippman	December 7, 1989	7D06	26.7
Ann goes overboard while defending a doctor accused of malpractice. Arnie ends up getting sued by a divorcee over his divorce video. Jonathan argues a case against a cereal manufacturer.
69	7	"Placenta Claus Is Coming to Town"	Rob Thompson	William M. Finkelstein and Cynthia Saunders	December 14, 1989	7D07	27.0
A verdict is expected in Michael's latest case. Earl Williams' mother (Beah Richards) takes the stand. Benny decides to propose to Alice. Ann gives birth to a baby boy.
70	8	"The Good Human Bar"	Johanna Demetrakas	David E. Kelley and Cynthia Saunders	January 4, 1990	7D08	25.7
Victor's professional and personal lives collide when his girlfriend Allison is raped. He gets Grace to become the case prosecutor and personally petitions the court on behalf of his client/girlfriend to order a HIV test on the alleged rapist. One of Jonathan's friends, who is terminally ill, wants his help in ending her life. Roxanne takes singing lessons, and Michael takes an interest in her dance instructor (Courtney Thorne-Smith).
71	9	"Noah's Bark"	Win Phelps	David E. Kelley and William M. Finkelstein	January 11, 1990	7D09	26.4
Leland is livid when he discovers that Arnie has been wooing clients away to set up his own practice. The man who raped Allison goes to trial. Jonathan represents a man whose employer (Terry Kiser) fired him because of on-the-job outbursts related to Tourette's syndrome.
72	10	"The Pay's Lousy, But the Tips Are Great"	David Carson	David E. Kelley, William M. Finkelstein and Cynthia Saunders	January 18, 1990	7D10	25.6
The staff is less than welcoming when Arnie and Roxanne return to the firm. Rosalind begins playing mind games with the partners to pit them against each other. Victor and Allison decide to call it quits even after couples therapy. Stuart handles the case of a botched circumcision.
73	11	"True Brit"	Arthur Allan Seidelman	David E. Kelley, William M. Finkelstein and Cynthia Saunders	January 25, 1990	7D11	25.1
Michael goes toe to toe with an unscrupulous British attorney who pretends to be ignorant of American laws. With Rosalind's dominance at the firm, Ann fears for her position. Arnie's name is added to the firm's letterhead.
74	12	"On Your Honor"	Steven Robman	David E. Kelley and William M. Finkelstein	February 8, 1990	7D12	25.2
Victor represents a widowed Iranian-American mother against the US Navy. Roxanne and the other secretaries in the office go on strike. Grace is offered the opportunity to be a judge. Leland ponders retirement.
75	13	"Whatever Happened to Hannah?"	Tom Moore	David E. Kelley, William M. Finkelstein, Christopher Keyser and Amy Lippman	February 15, 1990	7D13	25.2
Abby represents a battered wife (Sian Barbara Allen, in her final role before retiring from acting in her 40s). Jonathan's client (David Paymer), a stand-up comic, is seeking damages from a heckler who happens to be his ex-wife (Sue Giosa). Ann and Rosalind have a nasty confrontation.
76	14	"Ex-Wives and Videotapes"	Miles Watkins	David E. Kelley and William M. Finkelstein	February 22, 1990	7D14	26.1
Michael works overtime to get Earl Williams' case reopened. Arnie represents a network newscaster's (Erin Gray) ex-husband when he is seeking a cash settlement in exchange for a potentially embarrassing video.
77	15	"Blood, Sweat and Fears"	Edwin Sherin	David E. Kelley	March 15, 1990	7D15	23.7
When Leland announces his intention to resign, Douglas, Stuart and Rosalind all want to take his spot. Victor defends a doctor (Franc Luz) who refused to operate on an AIDS patient. Michael relentlessly pursues the professor's new case.
78	16	"Bounds for Glory"	Win Phelps	David E. Kelley and William M. Finkelstein	March 22, 1990	7D16	25.3
Ann represents a family seeking damages against the family of the young man who killed their son. Abby discovers a new ally in Rosalind. Benny faces a lawsuit over his baseball card collection.
79	17	"Justice Swerved"	Menachem Binetski	David E. Kelley and Bryce Zabel	March 29, 1990	7D17	22.9
Stuart gets careless with his drinking. A married couple (William Converse -Roberts) and (Joan McMurtrey) face trial over the death of their child. Douglas seeks help with his love life.
80	18	"Watts a Matter?"	Tom Moore	David E. Kelley and Bryce Zabel	April 5, 1990	7D18	22.6
Rosalind undermines Victor's attempt to sue an alcohol manufacturer. The stress and pressure of being a judge begins to take its toll on Grace.
81	19	"Bang... Zoom... Zap"	Miles Watkins	David E. Kelley and William M. Finkelstein	April 26, 1990	7D19	23.9
Angry with the way that Rosalind is running the firm, Leland decides that he once again wants to be senior partner. Roxanne deals with her elderly father. Grace receives a reprimand. Special guest stars: Vincent Gardenia and Lance LeGault
82	20	"Forgive Me Father, For I Have Sued"	Elodie Keene	John Romano, David E. Kelley and William M. Finkelstein	May 3, 1990	7D20	23.8
Leland's plan to oust Rosalind may not get off the ground. Roxanne takes control of her father's affairs.
83	21	"Outward Bound"	Edwin Sherin	David E. Kelley and William M. Finkelstein	May 10, 1990	7D21	22.4
A policeman sues a reporter after his homosexuality is exposed. Michael announces a career move. Leland approaches Grace about a partnership. Arnie nearly blows his marriage plans by having an affair with Gwen the night before his wedding to Corrinne. Sheila Kelley joins the cast as Gwen Taylor.
84	22	"The Last Gasp"	Rick Wallace	David E. Kelley and William M. Finkelstein	May 17, 1990	7D22	22.3
Victor aids a condemned prisoner (A. Martinez) who was once a childhood friend. Chicago Bears coach Mike Ditka (guest starring as himself) takes the stand when the team is sued by an angry fan. Arnie's domineering mother (Jeanne Cooper) visits again as Arnie and Corrinne are to be married. A. Martinez would later return as a full time castmember in seasons 7 and 8 as a new character, attorney Daniel Morales.

=== Season 5 (1990–91) ===
No. overall	No. in season	Title	Directed by	Written by	Original release date	Prod. code	Viewers (millions)
85	1	"The Bitch Is Back"	Elodie Keene	David E. Kelley	October 18, 1990	7L01	23.4
Rosalind Shays returns and slaps the firm with a sexual discrimination lawsuit. Grace and Victor join forces in court. Michael handles a racially sensitive case.
86	2	"Happy Trails"	Win Phelps	Barry M. Schkolnick	October 25, 1990	7L02	21.7
When Leland and Arnie do little to help the defense in the Rosalind Shays case, Grace saves the day with a surprise witness. Michael faces a biased jury.
87	3	"Lie Harder"	David Carson	Judith Feldman & Sarah Woodside Gallagher	November 1, 1990	7L03	21.6
Abby represents a desperate couple who are trying to give back their adopted son after he badly injured their daughter. Arnie is caught inside a terrible triangle of his own making when he discovers that Corrinne and Gwen know each other. Grace gets help from an old friend. Corrinne takes advantage of Roxanne, and the two have a heated exchange.
88	4	"Armand's Hammer"	Menachem Binetski	John Hill	November 8, 1990	7L04	24.4
Jonathan takes charge in a racially tense case. A protester's attorney drills through the firm's stonewalling tactics. A TV blooper victim files suit. Amanda Donohoe joins the cast as C.J. Lamb.
89	5	"Smoke Gets in Your Thighs"	Richard Compton	Patricia Green	November 15, 1990	7L05	21.6
Ann represents a man whose lover is dying of ALS when the dying man's parents refuse visitation rights. Benny gets bilked by a cult. Grace settles into a new romantic relationship with an old adversary.
90	6	"Vowel Play"	Edwin Sherin	David E. Kelley & Patricia Green	November 29, 1990	7L06	21.1
The firm's newest members, C.J. and Tommy, battle a tobacco company. Ann suspects a change in her marriage. Douglas appears on the TV game show Wheel of Fortune. John Spencer joins the cast as Tommy Mullaney. Special guest stars: Bob Goen and Vanna White.
91	7	"New Kidney on the Block"	Steven Robman	John Hill & Stephen Katz	December 6, 1990	7L07	20.5
Grace faces a decision over a kidney needed by a client. Michael represents a flag-burning Vietnam veteran. C.J. causes a stir.
92	8	"God Rest Ye Murray Gentleman"	Tom Moore	Stephen Katz & David E. Kelley	December 13, 1990	7L08	22.1
Leland proposes defending Rosalind on a savings-and-loan fraud charge. Victor is disgusted to be representing partners in a medical office who fired a brilliant physician because his ruined facial features scared patients. Guest stars John Glover and Vanna White
93	9	"Splatoon"	Elodie Keene	John Hill & Barry M. Schkolnick	January 3, 1991	7L09	23.4
Abby appears on The Phil Donahue Show to defend gun rights, and when Ann criticizes her interview Abby lets her old friend have it. Douglas, Jonathan and Stuart use paint-firing pistols in a mock war game. Tommy battles a fight promoter. Victor and Grace try to determine the status of their new relationship. Special guest star: Phil Donahue
94	10	"Pump it Up"	Mervin B. Dayan	David E. Kelley & Judith Feldman & Sarah Woodside Gallagher	January 10, 1991	7L10	23.3
Victor halfheartedly represents a murderer. Arnie maneuvers to increase a prenuptial agreement. Leland upsets the partners with his latest news. Michael ponders changes in his career.
95	11	"Rest in Pieces"	Win Phelps	John Robert Bensink & Patricia Green	January 31, 1991	7L11	19.8
Grace co-defends a young soldier in a military court-martial after he refused orders to fire against targets in Panama. Roxanne's talk makes Arnie nervous. Douglas takes charge of the firm. C.J. represents the owners of a haunted house. After discovering his cheating ways, Corrinne files for divorce from Arnie.
96	12	"He's a Crowd"	Elodie Keene	David E. Kelley	February 7, 1991	7L12	21.2
Michael defends a man with multiple personalities. Leland needs Rosalind's help. Roxanne is a reluctant witness in Arnie's divorce case. When C.J. seeks Abby's friendship, the two share an unexpected moment. Cecil Hoffman joins the cast as Zoey Clemmons. This episode is the first of a series of lesbian kiss episodes, in which a hetero-identified female character is kissed by a lesbian- or bisexual-identified one.
97	13	"Dances with Sharks"	David Carson	Story by : Patricia Green & Alan Brennert & Melinda M. Snodgrass; Teleplay by : Patricia Green & Alan Brennert	February 14, 1991	7L13	22.9
C.J. does battle in an American Indian court. Jonathan is falsely arrested for rape. The firm loses a client due to Arnie's marital problems.
98	14	"The Gods Must Be Lawyers"	Tom Moore	David E. Kelley	February 21, 1991	7L14	22.4
Victor faces a life-or-death decision involving his brother. Michael defends a husband-killing woman. Zoey prosecutes a man for statutory rape. Special guest star: Wayne Newton.
99	15	"The Beverly Hills Hangers"	Gabrielle Beaumont	David E. Kelley	March 14, 1991	7L15	23.4
Michael and Tommy team up for a high profile case when a woman and her lover are accused of hanging the woman's husband. Leland is shocked by a proposal. Special guest star: Harley Jane Kozak.
100	16	"Good to the Last Drop"	Menachem Binetski	David E. Kelley & Patricia Green & Alan Brennert	March 21, 1991	7L16	26.2
Victor overzealously represents a woman who was given an unnecessary hysterectomy. Stuart puts in a request to become a trial lawyer. Zoey loses a star witness in her latest case. When Rosalind returns to the firm to help Leland with a case, the results prove deadly.
101	17	"Mutinies on the Banzai"	Win Phelps	David E. Kelley & Patricia Green & Alan Brennert	March 28, 1991	7L17	23.4
Michael rebels when Leland extends Douglas's term as temporary senior partner. Victor is worried about Grace, due to her pregnancy. Jonathan presses a discrimination case. The members of the firm all react differently to Rosalind's demise.
102	18	"As God Is My Co-Defendant"	Miles Watkins	David E. Kelley & Judith Feldman & Sarah Woodside Gallagher	April 4, 1991	7L18	24.4
When Michael creates an internal war, Leland and Douglas terminate his employment and sue him for sabotage. Tommy defends a religious couple who let their son die as a part of their faith. C.J. and Zoey lecture foreign attorneys. A familiar face returns to shake things up.
103	19	"Speak, Lawyers, For Me"	Paul Lazarus	David E. Kelley & Patricia Green & Alan Brennert	April 25, 1991	7L19	23.5
Michael seeks to dissolve the partnership. Douglas represents a transgender model who was fired by a cosmetics company when her status was discovered. Tommy represents the family of a college football star who died when he committed suicide due to his use of steroids. The bickering among the office takes its toll on Benny. Original castmember Harry Hamlin departs from the series.
104	20	"There Goes the Judge"	Elodie Keene	David E. Kelley & Patricia Green & Alan Brennert	May 2, 1991	7L20	22.6
Jonathan's latest case hits close to home. A loopy judge gets even loopier. Abby pursues a relationship with C.J.
105	21	"On the Toad Again"	Michael Katleman	David E. Kelley	May 9, 1991	7L21	22.3
Ann uses desperate measures to defend a woman accused of murder. C.J. argues for an elderly man who gets high from licking toads. Leland arbitrates his first case.
106	22	"Since I Fell For You"	Win Phelps	David E. Kelley & Patricia Green & Alan Brennert	May 16, 1991	7L22	23.3
Ann's career is in jeopardy after her former client is murdered. Victor represents an attorney who is dying of AIDS in his suit to force his insurance company to pay for experimental treatment. Arnie and Roxanne begin a new relationship. After her shocking death, Leland learns that he will inherit the bulk of Rosalind's estate. Victor and Grace become husband and wife. Original cast members Michele Greene and Jimmy Smits depart from the series.

=== Season 6 (1991–92) ===
No. overall	No. in season	Title	Directed by	Written by	Original release date	Prod. code	Viewers (millions)
107	1	"Something Old, Something Nude"	Rick Wallace	Patricia Green	October 10, 1991	8L01	26.0
With money problems around the corner, Leland and Douglas rent out part of the firm's office space to a flashy entertainment lawyer and her sleazy associate. Grace returns to the firm after her miscarriage and subsequent separation from Victor. Ann and Stuart argue over a choice of nanny for Matthew. Gwen serves on a jury. Conchata Ferrell and Michael Cumpsty join the cast as Susan Bloom and Frank Kittredge.
108	2	"TV or Not TV"	Elodie Keene	Judith Feldman & Sarah Woodside Gallagher	October 17, 1991	8L02	20.8
Jonathan represents a brother in a tragic case where he is opposing his brother who wants the court to declare their MIA father died in Vietnam. Grace's personal problems cloud her judgment. Arnie fills in for a TV legal reporter.
109	3	"Do the Spike Thing"	Michael Katleman	Carol Flint	October 31, 1991	8L03	20.1
Ann defends a logging company against a mill worker who lost an arm when a saw blade struck a spike embedded in a log by radical environmentalists. Douglas is attacked outside a gay restaurant and initially refuses to testify for fear of being identified as gay. C.J.'s Shakespearean actor father visits.
110	4	"Spleen It to Me, Lucy"	Michael Fresco	Matt Kiene & Joe Reinkemeyer	November 7, 1991	8L04	20.8
Zoey battles a convicted rapist-murderer's stay of execution. New associate Billy Castroverti (Tom Verica) represents a patient whose spleen was removed and used to invent a profitable drug. Roxanne and Susan battle over control of the office staff.
111	5	"Monkey on My Back Lot"	Tom Moore	Alan Brennert	November 14, 1991	8L05	21.1
A convicted child abuser retains Grace to change her probation terms. Tommy argues a case against firearms. Leland temporarily gains custody of a chimp during an arbitration case. Arnie reconsiders his living arrangements and asks Roxanne to move in with him.
112	6	"Badfellas"	Win Phelps	Carol Flint and Roger Lowenstein	November 21, 1991	8L06	28.2
Frank's new client jeopardizes the firm's relationship with new district attorney Ruby Thomas (Lynne Thigpen). Stuart goes one-on-one in a sports case.
113	7	"Lose the Boss"	Mervin Dayan	Anne Kenney, Alan Brennert, Judith Feldman & Sarah Woodside Gallagher	December 12, 1991	8L07	19.7
Douglas's sister-in-law hires Grace to sue a school board that will not cover her autistic son's special education costs. Gwen turns the tables on a demanding Arnie.
114	8	"The Nut Before Christmas"	Paul Lazarus	Patricia Green and Carol Flint	December 19, 1991	8L08	18.9
Arnie takes the case of C.J.'s former lover whose ex-husband is threatening to take her children away from her for being a lesbian. An important client forces Leland and Douglas to fire Billy. A temporary secretary causes chaos at the office during the busy holiday season.
115	9	"Guess Who's Coming To Murder?"	Rick Wallace	David E. Kelley	January 9, 1992	8L09	22.9
Zoey and Tommy square off in court when he defends a calculating serial killer (Timothy Carhart). Douglas, Ann and Stuart work together to court a client who is both brilliant and crazy. Susan and Leland continue to butt heads. Special guest star: Kevin Spacey
116	10	"Back to the Suture"	Elodie Keene	Steven Bochco and David Milch	January 16, 1992	8L10	21.9
Ann sues a doctor for causing a woman's permanent paralysis. Benny appears in family court, hoping to be granted custody of a homeless boy. Arnie considers a network TV offer. A serial killer tries to strike again.
117	11	"All About Sleaze"	Richard Compton	Alan Brennert and Judith Feldman & Sarah Woodside Gallagher	January 30, 1992	8L11	19.5
C.J. takes aim at the Witness Protection program's failings after a criminal in the program murdered a grieving man's wife. Arnie is oblivious to his role in a power struggle. Tommy is overcome with depression due to recent events. Special guest star: Bryan Cranston
118	12	"I'm Ready for My Closeup, Mr. Markowitz"	Bradley Silberling	Alan Brennert, Anne Kenney and Paul Manning	February 13, 1992	8L12	18.0
Tommy, along with new associate Alex DePalma (Anthony DeSando), fights a chemical firm that is accusing of poisoning its workforce. Zoey is stunned when Margaret Flanagan begins have terrifying flashbacks of her childhood. Stuart helps a screen legend (Anne Jeffreys) with her tax troubles.
119	13	"Steal It Again, Sam"	Elodie Keene	David E. Kelley, Carol Flint and Patricia Green	February 20, 1992	8L13	20.3
Victor returns and intends to reconcile with an unwilling Grace. Benny's foster son, Sam, has an unflattering habit. Special guest stars: Jimmy Smits, Gates McFadden
120	14	"Diet, Diet, My Darling"	Michael Fresco	Anne Kenney, Alan Brennert, Judth Feldman & Sarah Woodside Gallagher	February 27, 1992	8L14	20.5
Margaret sues her father for raping her and her sister when they were children. A cookbook author sues her former student. Jonathan's parents arrive in Los Angeles for a visit. Special guest stars: Bonnie Bartlett, Robert Guillaume and Madge Sinclair
121	15	"Great Balls Afire"	Gabrielle Beaumont	Alan Brennert and Anne Kenney	March 19, 1992	8L15	20.4
Ann and Stuart are shocked when a young woman shows up, claiming to be Stuart's daughter. Arnie gets more than he bargained for when working late with TV news anchor Julie Rayburn (Lauren Lane). Special guest star: Alison Tucker, the real-life daughter of Michael Tucker, begins a recurring role as Sarah Alder, Stuart's daughter.
122	16	"From Here to Paternity"	Elodie Keene	Steve Brown, Carol Flint and Alan Brennert	March 26, 1992	8L16	21.1
Grace defends a baseball star accused of rape. Alex becomes tangled up in a sting operation against a corrupt judge led by Ruby. Roxanne and Arnie hit a rough patch in their relationship.
123	17	"P.S. Your Shrink Is Dead"	Win Phelps	Anne Kenney, Alan Brennert and Paul Manning	April 16, 1992	8L17	18.2
Arnie's psychiatrist drops dead during a session. Frank and Gwen take their relationship to a new level. Leland takes Alex to task about his role in the sting operation.
124	18	"Love in Bloom"	Paul Lazarus	Carol Flint, Robert Crais, Judith Feldman & Sarah Woodside Gallagher	April 23, 1992	8L18	18.5
Susan's marriage raises eyebrows at the firm and with the INS. Zoey prosecutes a millionaire who is accused of killing a homeless man. Both Douglas and Benny experience parental issues.
125	19	"Silence of the Lambskins"	Elodie Keene	Alan Brennert and Paul Manning	April 30, 1992	8L19	17.7
Gwen inadvertently helps Frank ruin Arnie's latest case. Zoey and Jonathan ponder where their relationship is headed.
126	20	"Beauty and the Breast"	Tom Moore	Carol Flint, Paul Manning, Channing Gibson & Charles H. Eglee	May 7, 1992	8L20	19.3
C.J. represents a movie studio when an actress sues them for making her get breast implants. Frank is fired after Gwen exposes his duplicity to Leland and the rest of the firm. Susan has reservations about her marriage.
127	21	"Double Breasted Suit"	Win Phelps	Anne Kenney and Judith Feldman & Sarah Woodside Gallagher	May 14, 1992	8L21	20.5
C.J. finds herself attracted to the defense attorney in her latest case. Grace represents a man who claimed he was ripped off by a psychic. Zoey decides to end things with Jonathan. Special guest star: David Rasche
128	22	"Say Goodnight, Gracie"	Rick Wallace	Alan Brennert and Channing Gibson & Charles H. Eglee	May 21, 1992	8L22	20.9
Grace decides to reconcile with Victor and move to New York. An emotionally devastated defendant shoots Zoey at the courthouse after she perjures herself on the stand over him being raped in prison and becoming HIV+. After a bitter divorce and years of acrimony, Douglas and Sheila decide to remarry. Original castmember Susan Dey departs from the series.

=== Season 7 (1992–93) ===
No. overall	No. in season	Title	Directed by	Written by	Original release date	Prod. code	Viewers (millions)
129	1	"L.A. Lawless"	Rick Wallace	John Masius & John Tinker	October 22, 1992	9L01	18.4
The firm is forced to once again restructure after the departures of Grace Van Owen, C.J. Lamb, and Susan Bloom and the arrival of a new partner. Meanwhile, Arnie once again approaches Leland about switching to entertainment law, both Douglas and Stuart find themselves in the middle of the Los Angeles riots, and Tommy considers a change in his career. A. Martinez joins the cast as Daniel Morales. Special Guest Star: Dan Castellaneta as David Champion, a former theme park mascot performer for Homer Simpson.
130	2	"Second Time Around"	Elodie Keene	Paul Manning	October 29, 1992	9L02	19.3
Daniel and Leland are at odds when a case that Leland prosecuted more than 30 years ago is reopened. Douglas decides to sue the city after his arrest during the riots. Jonathan continues his campaign for city council. Stuart is released from the hospital. Zoey returns to work after the shooting.
131	3	"Zo Long"	Marisa Silver	Story by : Anne Kenney; Teleplay by : Anne Kenney and John Masius & John Tinker	November 5, 1992	9L03	16.8
Douglas and Stuart continue to experience aftershocks from the riots. Tommy prosecutes his first case after leaving McKenzie Brackman and moving to the district attorney's office. Jonathan's political career is over before it starts. Zoey decides to quit her job and the law profession altogether. Cecil Hoffman leaves the cast.
132	4	"Wine Knot"	Oz Scott	Julie Martin	November 12, 1992	9L04	17.5
After a tumultuous series of events in their lives, Douglas, Jonathan and Stuart all return to the firm. Arnie represents a man who is suing his brother over his share of the family business. Gwen begins receiving gifts from a secret admirer. Roxanne makes a shocking announcement.
133	5	"My Friend Flicker"	Jeffrey D. Brown	Janis Hirsch	November 19, 1992	9L05	16.3
After the riots, Douglas decides to reflect on his life. Leland represents an old friend in a discrimination case. Arnie's dreams of pursuing entertainment law reignite. Roxanne shocks Tommy (and everyone else) by asking him to father her child. Special guest star: Shelley Berman begins a six episode run as Hollywood movie mogul Ben Flicker.
134	6	"Love on the Rox"	Andre R. Guttfreund	Theresa Rebeck	December 3, 1992	9L06	16.2
Ann represents a man who does not want to father his ex-wife's children. Leland helps Gwen during her first case. Roxanne receives an answer from Tommy. After receiving more gifts and a few creepy run-ins, Gwen believes she is being stalked.
135	7	"Helter Shelter"	Tom Moore	John Masius & John Tinker	December 10, 1992	9L07	16.5
Melina Paros (Lisa Zane) joins the firm as an associate. Stuart, still unhinged after the riots, loses further control of reality. Arnie gets more involved with movie mogul Ben Flicker and his troubled empire. Gwen receives more mysterious gifts and begins to suspect that Daniel is her stalker. Roxanne and Tommy decide to pursue a relationship.
136	8	"Christmas Stalking"	Mervin B. Dayan	Julie Martin and John Masius & John Tinker	December 17, 1992	9L08	17.3
Ann and Tommy help Stuart beat the charges against him. Through a strange turn of events, Arnie receives a job offer from Ben Flicker. Melina learns that Leland pulled a few strings to help her case. Stuart receives help for his medical condition. Roxanne and Tommy receive some good news.
137	9	"Odor in the Court"	Victor Lobl	Paul Manning	January 7, 1993	9L09	17.1
Tommy fights to keep a mentally deranged killer behind bars. Daniel represents a man suing a slaughterhouse for stinking up his property. Arnie finally sees Eric Schuller but there's a hitch: he's buried in the ice rink of World Wide Studios.
138	10	"Spanky and the Art Gang"	Elodie Keene	D. Keith Mano	January 14, 1993	9L10	17.5
Arnie & Daniel represent Eric Schuller's BDSM mistress in a murder trial. Jonathan represents a property developer with a controversial statue. Douglas disagrees with his prison pal over a raunchy section in his biography. Gwen fears she might have Huntington's disease and receives a visit from a woman (Anne Twomey) who is meant to be dead.
139	11	"Bare Witness"	Oz Scott	Julie Martin	February 4, 1993	9L11	17.0
Douglas represents an adult entertainment club. Stuart has a change of heart about pressing charges when he realizes that one of his attackers has a son the same age as Matthew. Through a strange turn of events, Arnie becomes president of World Wide Studios. Jonathan seeks redemption for destroying a controversial statue. Gwen receives the results of her blood test.
140	12	"Parent Trap"	Steven Robman	Roger Lowenstein	February 11, 1993	9L12	16.5
Jonathan represents a man (Raphael Sbarge) wanting to keep his comatose wife alive so that his child may be born. Stuart refuses to identify his attackers in court in an act of social justice. Daniel is held in contempt after refusing to turn over evidence in his latest murder trial. Tommy's father (William Hickey) arrives from Boston for a visit. In a moment of heightened confusion, Daniel's daughter, Lucy, is kidnapped.
141	13	"Hello and Goodbye"	Andre R. Guttfreund	Paul Manning	February 18, 1993	9L13	13.5
Ann's civil suit against the LAPD causes tension in her marriage. Melina represents a widow (Shirley Knight) suing a cameraman for not stopping her husband from immolating himself. Tommy Mullaney, Sr. (William Hickey) has a fatal heart attack, and Tommy Jr. falls off the wagon. Gwen is caught in a deadly game of cat and mouse and her stalker (Anne Twomey) murders an FBI agent.
142	14	"Where There's a Will"	Michael Schultz	Hugh O'Neill	February 25, 1993	9L14	16.6
Leland and Daniel track down a witness (Lawrence Tierney) who could clear Frank Osgood (R.G. Armstrong). Melina crosses a long-term family friend whom she is defending in a murder-for-hire case. Tommy finally comes to his senses and returns to Roxanne. Gwen finds the 24-hour police protection hard to endure. Douglas is less than pleased with the film version of his biography. Special Guest Star: Erik Estrada.
143	15	"F.O.B."	Rick Wallace	William M. Finkelstein	April 1, 1993	9L15	17.8
The entire firm is interested when Ann takes a test case against a psychiatric hospital from a man who claims to have connections to Bill Clinton's administration. Daniel defends a man (James Gammon) accused of giving out street justice. Arnie represents a boxer's wife in divorce.
144	16	"Cold Shower"	Win Phelps	Anne Kenney & Jennifer Flackett & Roger Lowenstein	April 8, 1993	9L16	17.7
Stuart's client takes offense to the attitude of an IRS agent during an audit. Jonathan's art thief client is claiming entrapment by an undercover police officer posing as a potential love interest. Tommy can't handle all the pressure from his impending fatherhood and has a change of heart in a case of a schoolyard fight turned deadly.
145	17	"That's Why the Lady Is a Stamp"	Elodie Keene	William M. Finkelstein & Paul Manning & Peter Schneider & Julie Martin	April 15, 1993	9L17	16.0
Leland executes the will of an old friend, and finds a surprise in his stamp collection. Douglas & Arnie are suspicious of Benny's new friend. Melina represents a man suing the United States Postal Service for not preventing a postal worker from going postal. Douglas grows concerned over Gwen being given increased responsibility.
146	18	"Come Rain or Come Schein"	Tom Moore	William M. Finkelstein & Peter Schneider & Roger Lowenstein	April 22, 1993	9L18	15.6
Ann represents a weatherman (George Wyner) who was fired for being too serious. Arnie has a client who holds out giving a Jewish divorce until he gets material concessions from his wife. Daniel represents his gardener when he is stiffed on a job by a wealthy lawyer.
147	19	"Vindaloo in the Villows"	James C. Hart	Anne Kenney & Paul Manning and Julie Martin	April 29, 1993	9L19	16.3
The waiters at Stuart's favorite Indian restaurant are sued when they start a food fight. Melina represents an African American woman suing the descendants of her ancestor's slave owners for his valuable artwork. Benny's girlfriend Rosalie (Kathleen Wilhoite) tells him a shocking secret. Special Guest Star: Della Reese
148	20	"Testing, Testing, 1...2...3...4"	Oz Scott	William M. Finkelstein & Paul Manning & Peter Schneider	May 6, 1993	9L20	15.5
Jonathan defends a baseball player who likes to beat up hecklers. Ann defends a second grade teacher fired for not taking a penile plethysmograph on the whim of a delusional parent. Gwen ponders her relationship with Daniel while studying for the bar exam.
149	21	"Bourbon Cowboy"	Randy Roberts	Anne Kenney & Paul Manning & Julie Martin	May 13, 1993	9L21	15.2
Arnie represents Leland's favorite country singer when his wife files for divorce. Melina faces a biased judge when she represents a prostitute who steals from johns. Gwen's bar review instructor keeps hitting on her.
150	22	"Hackett or Pack It"	Elodie Keene	William M. Finkelstein & Peter Schneider & Roger Lowenstein & Jennifer Flackett	May 27, 1993	9L22	16.3
Douglas represents Buddy Hackett (who guest stars as himself) against a children's show for likeness appropriation. Gwen sues her instructor for sexual harassment. Tommy prosecutes Rosalie's attacker. Meanwhile, Roxanne and Dave Meyer do business together and rediscover an old passion. Original cast member Susan Ruttan departs the series.

=== Season 8 (1993–94) ===
No. overall	No. in season	Title	Directed by	Written by	Original release date	Prod. code	Viewers (millions)
151	1	"Book of Renovation, Chapter 1"	Mark Tinker	William M. Finkelstein	October 7, 1993	1L01	17.4
Stuart's cousin, Eli Levinson, arrives from New York to work on a case. Arnie and Ann disagree over the hiring of new associate Jane Halliday. The firm undergoes endless renovations. Alan Rosenberg, Debi Mazar and Alexandra Powers join the cast.
152	2	"Leap of Faith"	Tom Moore	Paul Manning, Julie Martin and William M. Finkelstein	October 14, 1993	1L02	17.9
Eli believes the victim's husband may have played a role in her death, which could free his client. Jane represents a veteran who was stiffed by the Veterans Administration. Jonathan represents a home shopping network when the husband of a shopaholic sues them.
153	3	"How Much Is That Bentley in the Window?"	Elodie Keene	Anne Kenney and William M. Finkelstein	October 21, 1993	1L03	15.3
Eli calls the victim's husband to the stand. Douglas puts Daniel in charge of the firm's ongoing renovations. Arnie finally gets his dream car, a Bentley.
154	4	"Foreign Co-Respondent"	Mark Tinker	Paul Manning, Julie Martin and William M. Finkelstein	October 28, 1993	1L04	15.6
Tommy prosecutes a snakehead boss in the death of an immigrant. Eli has second thoughts about joining Leland's men's club when he thinks they either want him as a token Jew or do not really want him because he is Jewish. Douglas represents a couple whose world trip was not what they expected. Daniel takes over managing the renovations.
155	5	"The Green, Green Grass of Home"	James C. Hart	Anne Kenney and William M. Finkelstein	November 4, 1993	1L05	17.7
Stuart defends an old friend (Richard Masur) in a case involving a murder in the 1960s. Daniel represents the parents of a young girl who turned them over to the police for using marijuana. Benny develops a crush on Denise, and starts to ignore his girlfriend Rosalie.
156	6	"Safe Sex"	Mark Tinker	Paul Manning, Julie Martin, Anne Kenney and William M. Finkelstein	November 11, 1993	1L06	16.2
Arnie and Denise get locked in the panic room after hours. Jonathan joins Stuart in the Glassman case. When Jane sits co-chair to Ann in a case, the two end up battling each other. Guest Stars: Paul Dooley, Harry Shearer
157	7	"Pacific Rimshot"	Charles Haid	William M. Finkelstein	November 18, 1993	1L07	13.4
Arnie learns a lesson in racism. Stuart and Jonathan eagerly await the verdict in the Glassman case. Eli begins to fall for his private investigator, Jinx Haber (Elizabeth Peña).
158	8	"Eli's Gumming"	Dennis Dugan	Paul Manning, Julie Martin and Anne Kenney	December 9, 1993	1L08	14.6
Eli deals with the pressure of passing the California bar exam and the pressure of having romantic feelings for two women. Tommy prosecutes a john for raping a prostitute and gets a surprise.
159	9	"Rhyme and Punishment"	Gary Weis	Julie Martin and William M. Finkelstein	December 16, 1993	1L09	15.6
Eli is representing an aging comic whose son thinks his much younger mistress is taking advantage of him. Douglas represents the high brow against the low brow in a suit around the poetry business. Roxanne and Dave Meyer return to the fold to ask Tommy to sign over his parental rights to their child. guest stars: Mamie Van Doren, Susan Ruttan, Dann Florek, Jerry Stiller, William H. Macy
160	10	"He Ain't Guilty, He's My Brother"	Oz Scott	Paul Manning and Anne Kenney	February 3, 1994	1L10	17.3
Tommy's new relationship with a judge prompts an appeal from a convicted rapist's lawyer for judicial bias, then things got weird. Daniel agrees to defend a confused young man who wishes to confess to robbing a convenience store, but the man might not be guilty. Ann takes a civil case involving a man accused of sexual fraud for implying to a woman that he was an undercover cop. Arnie gets tricked by a fake come-on from Jane after telling her about his "divine" way of seeing the truth.
161	11	"McKenzie, Brackman, Barnum & Bailey"	Dennis Dugan	Julie Martin, Anne Kenney and Jennifer Flackett	February 10, 1994	1L11	16.2
A ballerina sues a dance company for breach of contract. An old juggler accuses his protege of stealing his act. Benny tries committing to Rosalie.
162	12	"Cold Cuts"	Elodie Keene	Paul Manning and William M. Finkelstein	February 17, 1994	1L12	11.8
Two mountaineers face charges after resorting to cannibalism. A mathematician faces the consequences of divorce. Denise gets in the middle of a father-son feud.
163	13	"Age of Insolence"	Win Phelps	Theresa Rebeck	February 24, 1994	1L13	12.9
Ann defends a woman who is being sued for the custody of her adopted daughter by the girl's biological father. Jane defends a highly-sensitive client from both her impolite co-worker and Arnie. Jonathan gives the partners an ultimatum about a partnership offer.
164	14	"God is My Co-Counsel"	Mark Tinker	Anne Kenney	March 10, 1994	1L14	16.1
Benny discovers that his fiancee is already married. Jane clashes with her father while defending a biology teacher fired for teaching creationism. Love is in the air at Benny's wedding, despite some truly terrifying bridesmaid outfits. Guest Stars: John Diehl
165	15	"Three on a Patch"	Dan Lerner	Paul Manning and William M. Finkelstein	March 17, 1994	1L15	15.8
Douglas defends senior citizens threatened with eviction from their retirement community for having over-active sex lives. Jonathan defends an inmate who claims the conditions of a prison violate the constitutional prohibition against cruel and unusual punishment. Jane teaches Arnie that a kiss is just a kiss.
166	16	"Whose San Andreas Fault Is it, Anyway?"	Elodie Keene	Phyllis Murphy & Jean Gennis	March 24, 1994	1L16	16.2
When Leland and Douglas decide to hire a new young associate with a shady past, Daniel decides to leave the firm. A. Martinez departs the series. Steven Eckholdt joins the cast as Patrick Flanagan. Denise is rather affected by earthquakes. Jane has the other side on the run but the client doesn't want to win.
167	17	"Silence is Golden"	Leslie Hill	Julie Martin and Paul Haggis	April 14, 1994	1L17	14.1
New associate Patrick Flanagan goes behind Arnie and Tommy's back during a case in which a young girl accuses a famous Hollywood producer of molestation. Jonathan represents a model whose father is too overbearing.
168	18	"Dead Issue"	Mark Tinker	Roger Lowenstein and William M. Finkelstein	April 21, 1994	1L18	14.6
Stuart defends a muckraking journalist who is being accused of libel for writing that a distinguished university professor was "Dr. Death" and exposed U.S. citizens to nuclear radiation during the 1950s. Ann represents the wife in a divorce case against the husband who is a Grateful Dead fanatic. Arnie represents the firm's favourite pornography aficionado & collector. The collector produced a film with his fiancé as director & star and finds himself prosecuted for pandering as he's deemed to be the customer. Arnie gets involved with the prosecutor.
169	19	"Tunnel of Love"	Elodie Keene	Peter Schneider, Anne Kenney and Paul Manning	April 28, 1994	1L19	16.7
An assistant district attorney becomes obsessed with Arnie. Leland represents his mechanic in a case about dogs having sex. Patrick represents a dentist suing a rival dentist for spreading HIV rumours against him.
170	20	"How Am I Driving?"	Mark Tinker	Paul Haggis, Julie Martin and William M. Finkelstein	May 5, 1994	1L20	15.6
Arnie represents an executive whose wife wants a one-sided divorce settlement as he employs the service of a madam. Eli buys a car, but hasn't got a driving license yet. Jonathan represents a father and the psychiatric facility where he commits his 16 year old daughter to for drugs, alcohol and sex with a black man.
171	21	"Whistle Stop"	Randy Roberts	Paul Manning, Julie Martin, Paul Haggis and Anne Kenney	May 12, 1994	1L21	13.9
Arnie's vengeful ex-girlfriend is the prosecuting attorney in the case when he is arrested for the murder of a Hollywood madam. Arnie, Eli and Jinx go on a stakeout. Leland gets the results of his biopsy. Tommy appears before his girlfriend's ex in a case he doesn't really want to win.
172	22	"Finish Line"	William M. Finkelstein	Story by : Anne Kenney, Paul Haggis and William M. Finkelstein; Teleplay by : Paul Manning, Julie Martin and Peter Schneider	May 19, 1994	1L22	22.1
Leland announces his abrupt retirement on his birthday. Eli represents a father being sued by his son for wrongful termination in a family firm.

== Sources ==
- Epguides.com episode guide
