= 43rd Primetime Emmy Awards =

1991 American television programming awards

- Date: August 25, 1991
- Location: Pasadena Civic Auditorium, Pasadena, California
- Presented by: Academy of Television Arts and Sciences
- Hosted by: Dennis Miller; Jamie Lee Curtis; Jerry Seinfeld

Highlights
- Most awards: Cheers (4)
- Most nominations: Cheers (9)
- Outstanding Comedy Series: Cheers
- Outstanding Drama Series: L.A. Law
- Outstanding Drama/Comedy Special and Miniseries: Separate but Equal
- Outstanding Variety, Music or Comedy Program: The 63rd Annual Academy Awards

Television/radio coverage
- Network: Fox

The 43rd Primetime Emmy Awards were held on Sunday, August 25, 1991. The ceremony was broadcast on Fox from the Pasadena Civic Auditorium in Pasadena, California, presenting 27 awards. The network TNT received its first major nomination at this ceremony.

For its ninth season, Cheers won Outstanding Comedy Series for the fourth time, tying All in the Family's record. Cheers' spinoff Frasier would later break this record, ultimately winning five in a row. Cheers also received the most major nominations (9) and major awards (4) during the ceremony. The drama field also saw a four-time winner crowned as L.A. Law won Outstanding Drama Series for the fourth time in five years. This tied the record set by Hill Street Blues whose four wins came consecutively. James Earl Jones joined an exclusive club, as he won two acting Emmys for his work on two different series.

John Gielgud's win for the Outstanding Lead Actor in a Limited Series or Special made him the fourth person to become an EGOT.

== Winners and nominees ==
=== Programs ===
Programs
| Outstanding Comedy Series: Cheers (NBC); Designing Women (CBS); The Golden Girls (NBC); Murphy Brown (CBS); The Wonder Years (ABC) | Outstanding Drama Series: L.A. Law (NBC); China Beach (ABC); Northern Exposure (CBS); Quantum Leap (NBC); Thirtysomething (ABC) |
| Outstanding Variety, Music or Comedy Program: The 63rd Annual Academy Awards (ABC); In Living Color (Fox); The Kennedy Center Honors: A Celebration of the Performing Arts (CBS); Late Night with David Letterman (NBC); The Muppets Celebrate Jim Henson (CBS); The Tonight Show Starring Johnny Carson (NBC) | Outstanding Drama/Comedy Special and Miniseries (Note: For this year only, the Outstanding Drama/Comedy Special and Outstanding Miniseries were combined so that TV Movies and Miniseries competed in the same category.): Separate but Equal (ABC); Decoration Day (NBC); The Josephine Baker Story (HBO); Paris Trout (Showtime); Sarah, Plain and Tall (CBS); Switched at Birth (NBC) |

=== Acting ===
==== Lead performances ====
Acting
| Outstanding Lead Actor in a Comedy Series: Burt Reynolds as Wood Newton in Evening Shade (CBS) (Episode: "A Day in the Life of Wood Newton"); Ted Danson as Sam Malone in Cheers (NBC) (Episode: "Bad Neighbor Sam"); John Goodman as Dan Conner in Roseanne (ABC) (Episode: "Her Boyfriends Back"); Richard Mulligan as Dr. Harry Weston in Empty Nest (NBC) (Episode: "The Mentor"); Craig T. Nelson as Coach Hayden Fox in Coach (ABC) (Episode: "The Break-Up") | Outstanding Lead Actress in a Comedy Series: Kirstie Alley as Rebecca Howe in Cheers (NBC) (Episode: "The Days of Wine and Neuroses"); Candice Bergen as Murphy Brown in Murphy Brown (CBS) (Episode: "On Another Plane"); Blair Brown as Molly Dodd in The Days and Nights of Molly Dodd (Lifetime) (Episode: "Here's a Pregnant Pause"); Delta Burke as Suzanne Sugarbaker in Designing Women (CBS) (Episode: "The Bachelor Auction"); Betty White as Rose Nylund in The Golden Girls (NBC) (Episode: "Once, in St. Olaf") |
| Outstanding Lead Actor in a Drama Series: James Earl Jones as Gabriel Bird in Gabriel's Fire (ABC) (Episode: "Pilot"); Scott Bakula as Sam Beckett in Quantum Leap (NBC) (Episode: "Shock Theater: October 3, 1954"); Peter Falk as Columbo in Columbo (ABC) (Episode: "Columbo and the Murder of a Rock Star"); Kyle MacLachlan as Special Agent Dale Cooper in Twin Peaks (ABC) (Episode: "Episode 16"); Michael Moriarty as Ben Stone in Law & Order (NBC) (Episode: "Indifference") | Outstanding Lead Actress in a Drama Series: Patricia Wettig as Nancy Krieger Weston in Thirtysomething (ABC) (Episode: "Guns and Roses"); Dana Delany as Nurse Colleen McMurphy in China Beach (ABC) (Episode: "Fever"); Sharon Gless as Rosie O'Neill in The Trials of Rosie O'Neill (CBS) (Episode: "When I'm 44"); Angela Lansbury as Jessica Fletcher in Murder, She Wrote (CBS) (Episode: "Thursday's Child") |
| Outstanding Lead Actor in a Miniseries or a Special: John Gielgud as Haverford Downs in Summer's Lease (PBS); James Garner as Albert Sidney Finch in Decoration Day (NBC); Dennis Hopper as Paris Trout in Paris Trout (Showtime); Sidney Poitier as Thurgood Marshall in Separate but Equal (ABC); Christopher Walken as Jacob Witting in Sarah, Plain and Tall (CBS) | Outstanding Lead Actress in a Miniseries or a Special: Lynn Whitfield as Josephine Baker in The Josephine Baker Story (HBO); Glenn Close as Sarah Wheaton in Sarah, Plain and Tall (CBS); Barbara Hershey as Hanna Trout in Paris Trout (Showtime); Suzanne Pleshette as Leona Helmsley in Leona Helmsley: The Queen of Mean (CBS); Lee Purcell as Bessie Robertson in Long Road Home (NBC) |

==== Supporting performances ====
| Outstanding Supporting Actor in a Comedy Series: Jonathan Winters as Gunny Davis in Davis Rules (ABC) (Episodes: "Rules of the Game" + "Mission: Improbable"); Charles Durning as Dr. Harlan Elldridge in Evening Shade (CBS) (Episodes: "Whatever Happened to Clutch Newton?" + "The Baby Show"); Woody Harrelson as Woody Boyd in Cheers (NBC) (Episodes: "Veggie-Boyd" + "Woody Interruptus"); Michael Jeter as Herman Stiles in Evening Shade (CBS) (Episodes: "Chip Off the Old Brick" + "Sex Education"); Jerry Van Dyke as Luther Van Dam in Coach (ABC) (Episodes: "Cabin Fever" + "A Father and Son Reunion") | Outstanding Supporting Actress in a Comedy Series: Bebe Neuwirth as Lilith Crane in Cheers (NBC) (Episodes: "Veggie-Boyd" + "Rat Girl"); Elizabeth Ashley as Freida Evans in Evening Shade (CBS) (Episodes: "There Once Was a Boy Named Wood" + "Chip Off the Old Brick"); Faith Ford as Corky Sherwood in Murphy Brown (CBS) (Episodes: "Trouble in Sherwood-Forrest" + "Corky's Place"); Estelle Getty as Sophia Petrillo in The Golden Girls (NBC) (Episodes: "Ebbtide's Revenge" + "There Goes the Bride: Part 1"); Rhea Perlman as Carla Tortelli in Cheers (NBC) (Episodes: "Carla Loves Clavin" + "Pitch It Again, Sam") |
| Outstanding Supporting Actor in a Drama Series: Timothy Busfield as Elliot Weston in Thirtysomething (ABC) (Episodes: "Sifting the Ashes" + "Second Look"); David Clennon as Miles Drentell in Thirtysomething (ABC) (Episodes: "Out the Door" + "A Stop at Willoughby"); Richard Dysart as Leland McKenzie Jr. in L.A. Law (NBC) (Episodes: "The Beverly Hills Hangers" + "Mutinies on the Banzai"); Jimmy Smits as Victor Sifuentes in L.A. Law (NBC) (Episodes: "God Rest Ye Murray Gentleman" + "The Gods Must Be Lawyers"); Dean Stockwell as Al Calavicci in Quantum Leap (NBC) (Episodes: "The Leap Home: Part 2 (Vietnam) – April 7, 1970" + "Shock Theater: October 3, 1954") | Outstanding Supporting Actress in a Drama Series: Madge Sinclair as Empress Josephine in Gabriel's Fire (ABC) (Episodes: "Tis the Season" + "The Great Waldo"); Marg Helgenberger as KC Kolowski in China Beach (ABC) (Episodes: "History, Part II – She Sells More Than Sea Shells" + "100 Klicks Out"); Piper Laurie as Catherine Martell in Twin Peaks (ABC) (Episodes: "Episode 13" + "Episode 18"); Melanie Mayron as Melissa Steadman in Thirtysomething (ABC) (Episodes: "Melissa and Men" + "Melissa in Wonderland"); Diana Muldaur as Rosalind Shays in L.A. Law (NBC) (Episodes: "He's a Crowd" + "The Beverly Hills Hangers") |
| Outstanding Supporting Actor in a Miniseries or a Special: James Earl Jones as Junius Johnson in Heat Wave (TNT); Rubén Blades as Count Giuseppe Pepito Abatino in The Josephine Baker Story (HBO); David Dukes as Jo Bouillon in The Josephine Baker Story (HBO); Richard Kiley as Chief Justice Earl Warren in Separate but Equal (ABC); Leon Russom as Titus Wardlow in Long Road Home (NBC) | Outstanding Supporting Actress in a Miniseries or a Special: Ruby Dee as Rowena in Decoration Day (NBC); Olympia Dukakis as Katherine Campbell in Lucky Day (ABC); Vanessa Redgrave as Empress Elizabeth in Young Catherine (TNT); Doris Roberts as Mimi Finkelstein in The Sunset Gang (PBS); Elaine Stritch as Rose in An Inconvenient Woman (PBS) |

==== Individual performances ====
Outstanding Individual Performance in a Variety or Music Program
- Billy Crystal – The 63rd Annual Academy Awards (ABC)
  - Dana Carvey – Saturday Night Live (NBC)
  - Harry Connick Jr. – Swinging Out with Harry (PBS)
  - Damon Wayans – In Living Color (Fox)
  - Keenan Ivory Wayans – In Living Color (Fox)

=== Directing ===
Directing
| Outstanding Directing in a Comedy Series: Cheers (NBC): "Woody Interruptus" – James Burrows; The Days and Nights of Molly Dodd (Lifetime): "Here's a Little Touch of Harry in the Night" – Jay Tarses; Murphy Brown (CBS): "On Another Plane" – Barnet Kellman; Seinfeld (NBC): "The Pony Remark" – Tom Cherones; The Wonder Years (ABC): "The Ties That Bind" – Peter Baldwin | Outstanding Directing in a Drama Series: Equal Justice (ABC): "In Confidence" – Thomas Carter; China Beach (ABC): "You, Babe" – Mimi Leder; Cop Rock (ABC): "Pilot" – Gregory Hoblit; L.A. Law (NBC): "God Rest Ye Murray Gentleman" – Tom Moore |
| Outstanding Directing in a Variety or Music Program: Late Night with David Letterman (NBC): "Show 1425" – Hal Gurnee; The 63rd Annual Academy Awards (ABC) – Jeff Margolis; The Kennedy Center Honors: A Celebration of the Performing Arts (CBS) – Dwight Hemion | Outstanding Directing in a Miniseries or a Special: The Josephine Baker Story (HBO) – Brian Gibson; Absolute Strangers (CBS) – Gilbert Cates; Decoration Day (NBC) – Robert Markowitz; Sarah, Plain and Tall (CBS) – Glenn Jordan |

=== Writing ===
Writing
| Outstanding Writing in a Comedy Series: Murphy Brown (CBS): "Jingle Hell, Jingle Hell, Jingle All The Way" – Gary Dontzig and Steven Peterman; The Days and Nights of Molly Dodd (Lifetime): "Here's a Little Touch of Harry in the Night" – Jay Tarses; Murphy Brown (CBS): "On Another Plane" – Diane English; Seinfeld (NBC): "The Deal" – Larry David; Seinfeld (NBC): "The Pony Remark" – Larry David and Jerry Seinfeld | Outstanding Writing in a Drama Series: L.A. Law (NBC): "On the Toad Again" – David E. Kelley; L.A. Law (NBC): "Lie Harder" – Judith Feldman and Sarah Woodside Gallagher; L.A. Law (NBC): "Mutinies on the Banzai" – David E. Kelley, Patricia Green and Alan Brennert; Northern Exposure (CBS): "Pilot" – Joshua Brand and John Falsey; Thirtysomething (ABC): "Second Look" – Ann Lewis Hamilton |
| Outstanding Writing in a Variety or Music Program: The 63rd Annual Academy Awards (ABC); In Living Color (Fox); Late Night with David Letterman (NBC); The Muppets Celebrate Jim Henson (CBS); Saturday Night Live (NBC) | Outstanding Writing in a Miniseries or a Special: House of Cards (PBS) – Andrew Davies; Decoration Day (NBC) – Robert W. Lenski; Paris Trout (Showtime) – Peter Dexter; Sarah, Plain and Tall (CBS) – Patricia MacLachlan; Separate but Equal (ABC) – George Stevens Jr. |

=== Miscellaneous ===
| Outstanding Casting for a Miniseries or Special: Alixe Gordin – Separate but Equal (ABC) | Outstanding Editing for a Series – Multi-Camera Production: Murphy Brown (CBS): "On Another Plane" – Tucker Wiard; Cheers (NBC): "The Days of Wine and Neuroses" – Andy Ackerman; Cheers (NBC): "Rat Girl" – Sheila Amos; Coach (ABC): "The Break-Up" – Andrew Chulack |

== Most major nominations ==
Networks with multiple major nominations (Note: "Major" constitutes the categories listed above: Program, Acting, Directing, and Writing. Does not include the technical categories.)
| Network | No. of Nominations |
|---|---|
| NBC | 46 |
| ABC | 36 |
| CBS | 31 |

Programs with multiple major nominations
| Program | Category | Network | No. of Nominations |
|---|---|---|---|
| Cheers | Comedy | NBC | 9 |
| L.A. Law | Drama | NBC | 8 |
| Murphy Brown | Comedy | CBS | 7 |
| Thirtysomething | Drama | ABC | 6 |
| Decoration Day | Miniseries/Special | NBC | 5 |
| The Josephine Baker Story | Miniseries/Special | HBO | 5 |
| Sarah, Plain and Tall | Miniseries/Special | CBS | 5 |
| Separate but Equal | Miniseries/Special | ABC | 5 |
| The 63rd Annual Academy Awards | Variety | ABC | 4 |
| China Beach | Drama | ABC | 4 |
| Evening Shade | Comedy | CBS | 4 |
| In Living Color | Variety | Fox | 4 |
| Paris Trout | Miniseries/Special | Showtime | 4 |
| Coach | Comedy | ABC | 3 |
| The Days and Nights of Molly Dodd | Comedy | Lifetime | 3 |
| The Golden Girls | Comedy | NBC | 3 |
| Late Night with David Letterman | Variety | NBC | 3 |
| Quantum Leap | Drama | NBC | 3 |
| Seinfeld | Comedy | NBC | 3 |
| Designing Women | Comedy | CBS | 2 |
| Gabriel's Fire | Drama | ABC | 2 |
| The Kennedy Center Honors | Variety | CBS | 2 |
| Long Road Home | Miniseries/Special | NBC | 2 |
| The Muppets Celebrate Jim Henson | Variety | CBS | 2 |
| Northern Exposure | Drama | CBS | 2 |
| Twin Peaks | Drama | ABC | 2 |
| The Wonder Years | Comedy | ABC | 2 |

== Most major awards ==
Networks with multiple major awards
| Network | No. of Awards |
|---|---|
| ABC | 11 |
| NBC | 8 |
| CBS | 3 |
| HBO | 2 |
| PBS | 2 |

Programs with multiple major awards
| Program | Category | Network | No. of Awards |
|---|---|---|---|
| Cheers | Comedy | NBC | 4 |
| The 63rd Annual Academy Awards | Variety | ABC | 3 |
| Gabriel's Fire | Drama | ABC | 2 |
| The Josephine Baker Story | Miniseries/Special | HBO | 2 |
| L.A. Law | Drama | NBC | 2 |
| Murphy Brown | Comedy | CBS | 2 |
| Separate but Equal | Miniseries/Special | ABC | 2 |
| Thirtysomething | Drama | ABC | 2 |

== Presenters ==
The awards were presented by the following people:

| Presenter(s) | Award(s) |
|---|---|
| Burt Reynolds; Loni Anderson | Outstanding Supporting Actress in a Comedy Series; Outstanding Directing for a Comedy Series |
| Victoria Principal | Outstanding Writing for a Comedy Series |
| Jane Seymour; John Goodman | Outstanding Supporting Actor in a Comedy Series |
| Corbin Bernsen; Christina Applegate | Outstanding Supporting Actress in a Drama Series; Outstanding Writing for a Drama Series |
| Craig T. Nelson; Jerry Van Dyke | Outstanding Directing for a Drama Series |
| Beatrice Arthur; Betty White; Rue McClanahan; Estelle Getty | Outstanding Supporting Actor in a Drama Series |
| Kirk Cameron; Chelsea Noble | Outstanding Supporting Actress in a Miniseries or Special |
| Richard Mulligan; Park Overall | Outstanding Directing for a Miniseries or Special |
| Mary-Kate Olsen; Ashley Olsen; Bob Saget | Outstanding Writing for a Miniseries or Special |
| Crystal Bernard; Alan Thicke | Outstanding Supporting Actor in a Miniseries or Special |
| The cast of Designing Women | Outstanding Casting for a Miniseries or Special |
| Richard Lewis | Outstanding Individual Performance in a Variety or Music Program |
| Jimmy Smits; Susan Dey | Outstanding Lead Actress in a Miniseries or Special |
| Sela Ward; Julianne Phillips; Fred Savage | Outstanding Lead Actor in a Miniseries or Special |
| Gilbert Gottfried | Outstanding Writing for a Variety or Music Program |
| Rob Morrow; Jeannine Taylor | Outstanding Directing for a Variety or Music Program |
| Faith Ford; Mike Myers | Outstanding Variety, Music or Comedy Program |
| Jason Priestley; Shannen Doherty; Luke Perry | Outstanding Lead Actor in a Drama Series |
| Peter Falk | Outstanding Lead Actress in a Drama Series |
| Harry Hamlin; Nicolette Sheridan | Outstanding Drama Series |
| Sam Kinison | Outstanding Editing for a Series – Multi-Camera Production |
| Keenan Ivory Wayans | Outstanding Drama/Comedy Special and Miniseries |
| Macaulay Culkin | Outstanding Lead Actress in a Comedy Series |
| Marilu Henner; Carol Kane; Christopher Lloyd | Outstanding Lead Actor in a Comedy Series |
| Carol Burnett | Outstanding Comedy Series |

== Tribute ==
A stand-alone tribute was presented to actor Michael Landon by his fellow Little House on the Prairie co-stars Melissa Gilbert and Merlin Olsen. Before the tribute, Gilbert briefly eulogized Lee Remick, Bert Convy, Harry Reasoner and Colleen Dewhurst.
