= Hooperman =

American comedy-drama television series (1987–1989)

- Genre: Comedy drama
- Created by: Steven Bochco; Terry Louise Fisher
- Starring: John Ritter; Debrah Farentino; Barbara Bosson; Felton Perry; Clarence Felder; Sydney Walsh; Joseph Gian; Alix Elias; Paul Linke (1988–1989); Rod Gist (1988–1989)
- Composer: Mike Post
- Country of origin: United States
- Original language: English
- No. of seasons: 2
- No. of episodes: 42

Production
- Executive producer: Robert M. Myman
- Running time: 30 minutes
- Production companies: Adam Productions; 20th Century Fox Television

Original release
- Network: ABC
- Release: September 23, 1987 – July 19, 1989

Hooperman is an American comedy-drama television series that aired on ABC from September 23, 1987, to July 19, 1989. The show centered on the professional and personal life of San Francisco police Inspector Harry Hooperman, played by John Ritter. The series was created by Steven Bochco and Terry Louise Fisher, who were the team responsible for creating L.A. Law. Though not the first comedy drama, Hooperman was considered the vanguard of a new television genre when it premiered, and critics coined the term "dramedy" to describe it.

== Synopsis ==
Ritter plays San Francisco police Inspector Harry Hooperman. In the first episode, Hooperman inherits the rundown apartment building he lives in when his elderly landlady is killed in a robbery. He also inherits her temperamental pet Jack Russell Terrier named Bijoux. Due to the demands of his job as a police officer, he hires Susan Smith (played by Debrah Farentino) to be the building manager, and the pair become romantically involved throughout the first season.

Also starring on the show was Alix Elias as the cheerful and bubbly police dispatcher, Betty Bushkin; Barbara Bosson was Hooperman's divorced superior, Capt. Celeste "C.Z." Stern; Felton Perry as Harry's partner, Inspector Clarence McNeil; Clarence Felder as redneck inspector Boris "Bobo" Pritzger; Joseph Gian as Rick Silardi, a gay cop, and Sydney Walsh as officer Maureen "Mo" DeMott, his patrol partner who was intent on "saving" him from being gay by making unwanted passes. Dan Lauria played Celeste's former husband, Lou Stern.

The theme music was composed by Mike Post.

Guest stars in the series' 42-episode run included: Don Cheadle, Kim Delaney, Dennis Dugan, Norman Fell (who worked with Ritter on The Stone Killer and Three's Company), Miguel Ferrer, Jack Gilford, Mark Hamill, Joanna Kerns (who did a guest spot on Three's Company), Richard Kind, Dan Lauria, Jane Leeves, Lorna Luft, David Paymer, Barbara Rush, and Shannon Tweed.

Except for a brief syndicated run on the FX Network in the mid-1990s, and the pilot rebroadcast on TV Land in 2003 following Ritter's death, the series has not been repeated.

== Episodes ==
=== Series overview ===
Season	Episodes	Originally released	
Season	Episodes	First released	Last released
1	22	September 23, 1987	May 18, 1988
2	20	November 30, 1988	July 19, 1989

=== Season 1 (1987–88) ===
No. overall	No. in season	Title	Directed by	Written by	Original release date	Prod. code	Rating/share (households)
1	1	"Hooperman"	Gregory Hoblit	Steven Bochco & Terry Louise Fisher	September 23, 1987	5J01	21.5/35
2	2	"The Answer My Friend Is Passing in the Wind"	Gregory Hoblit	Steven Bochco & Terry Louise Fisher	September 30, 1987	5J02	17.5/28
3	3	"Don We Now Our Gay Apparel"	Rick Wallace	Steven Bochco & Terry Louise Fisher	October 7, 1987	5J05	16.8/26
4	4	"Aria da Capo"	John Patterson	Story by : Steven Bochco; Teleplay by : Leon Tokatyan	October 14, 1987	5J04	17.9/27
5	5	"John Doe, We Hardly Knew Ye"	John Patterson	Story by : Lydia Woodward; Teleplay by : Rick Kellard	October 28, 1987	5J06	12.8/20
6	6	"The Shooting"	Nick Havinga	Story by : Steven Bochco & Amy K. Milkovich & Ed Milkovich; Teleplay by : Leon Tokatyan	November 4, 1987	5J07	15.9/25
7	7	"Hot Wired"	Michael Zinberg	Story by : Steven Bochco & Rick Kellard; Teleplay by : Rick Kellard	November 18, 1987	5J08	14.7/24
8	8	"Baby Talk"	Anson Williams	Steven Hollander	November 25, 1987	5J10	15.0/26
9	9	"Blues for Danny Welles"	Kim Friedman	Story by : Robert Rabinowitz & Steven Bochco & Rick Kellard; Teleplay by : Rick Kellard	December 2, 1987	5J11	17.8/29
10	10	"I, Witness"	Kim Friedman	Story by : Ross Hirshorn; Teleplay by : Leon Tokatyan & Rick Kellard	December 9, 1987	5J09	16.0/25
11	11	"Deck the Cell with Bars of Folly"	Peter Werner	Story by : Steven Bochco; Teleplay by : Peter Nasco	December 23, 1987	5J12	14.4/25
12	12	"The Naked and the Dead"	Paul Lynch	Story by : Steven Bochco & Gina Goldman; Teleplay by : Gina Goldman	January 6, 1988	5J13	15.6/24
13	13	"The Snitch"	Rick Wallace	Terry Hart	January 13, 1988	5J14	14.2/22
14	14	"Chariots of Fire"	Michael Zinberg	James Kramer	January 20, 1988	5J15	15.6/24
15	15	"High Noon"	Kim Friedman	Steven Hollander	February 3, 1988	5J16	16.4/25
16	16	"Blaste from the Past"	Anson Williams	Phil Kellard & Tom Moore	February 10, 1988	5J17	14.5/22
17	17	"Tomato Can"	John Patterson	John Schulian	March 9, 1988	5J19	13.2/20
18	18	"Me and Mr. Magoo"	Carl Gottlieb	Rick Kellard	March 16, 1988	5J03	13.7/22
19	19	"Baby on Board"	Bethany Rooney	Gina Wendkos	April 6, 1988	5J18	14.6/24
20	20	"Trudy and Clyde"	Michael Zinberg	Story by : Rick Kellard & Steven Hollander; Teleplay by : Phil Kellard & Tom Moore	April 13, 1988	5J20	12.6/20
21	21	"Nick Derringer, P.I."	Michael Zinberg	Steven Bochco & Rick Kellard	May 4, 1988	5J22	14.0/23
22	22	"Surprise Party"	John Patterson	Story by : Steven Bochco & Phil Kellard & Tom Moore; Teleplay by : Gary Rosen	May 18, 1988	5J21	11.1/19

=== Season 2 (1988–89) ===
No. overall	No. in season	Title	Directed by	Written by	Original release date	Prod. code	Viewers (millions)
23	1	"Requiem for an S.O.B."	Win Phelps	Rick Kellard	November 30, 1988	6X01	21.7
24	2	"We'll Always Have Paris"	Alan J. Levi	Story by : Rick Kellard & Michael Wagner; Teleplay by : Phil Kellard & Tom Moore & Jill Gordon	December 7, 1988	6X02	18.2
25	3	"Who Do You Truss?"	Alan J. Levi	Phil Kellard & Tom Moore	December 14, 1988	6X03	19.8
26	4	"In Search of Bijoux"	Anson Williams	Jill Gordon	December 21, 1988	6X04	20.8
27	5	"Look Homeward, Dirtbag"	Rob Cohen	Story by : Jill Gordon & Michael Wagner; Teleplay by : Douglas Steinberg & Rick Kellard & Michael Wagner	January 11, 1989	6X06	14.2
28	6	"Nightmare in Apartment One"	Jeff Melman	Phil Kellard & Tom Moore	January 18, 1989	6X07	19.2
29	7	"Hooperman Goes to Hell in a Handcart"	Ron Lagomarsino	Michael Wagner	January 25, 1989	6X05	14.0
30	8	"Rashomanny"	Ron Lagomarsino	R.W. Goodwin	February 1, 1989	6X10	17.9
31	9	"In the Still of My Pants"	Betty Thomas	Jill Gordon	February 8, 1989	6X09	16.3
32	10	"The Dating Game"	Neema Barnette	Sam Greenbaum	February 15, 1989	6X12	16.9
33	11	"Intolerance"	Eric Laneuville	Michael Wagner	February 22, 1989	6X11	13.9
34	12	"The Nun and I"	Roy Campanella II	Vic Rauseo & Linda Morris	March 1, 1989	6X14	16.6
35	13	"The Sure Thing"	Bethany Rooney	Story by : Phil Kellard & Tom Moore & Rick Kellard; Teleplay by : Jill Gordon	March 15, 1989	6X13	14.7
36	14	"The Long So Long"	Jeffrey D. Brown	Bob Dolan Smith	March 22, 1989	6X15	15.7
37	15	"Stakeout"	Max Tash	Jill Gordon	June 14, 1989	6X18	9.2
38	16	"Dog Day Afternoon, Morning and Night"	Betty Thomas	Jill Gordon & Phil Kellard & Tom Moore & Michael Wagner	June 21, 1989	6X20	10.9
39	17	"Love Bytes"	Arlene Sanford	Phil Kellard & Tom Moore	June 28, 1989	6X16	10.8
40	18	"Take My Building, Please"	Roy Campanella II	Rick Kellard	July 5, 1989	6X19	10.0
41	19	"Some of That Jazz"	Arlene Sanford	Glen Merzer	July 12, 1989	6X08	10.7
42	20	"Goodnight, Sweet Hooperman"	Betty Thomas	Michael Wagner	July 26, 1989	6X17	10.6

== Home media ==
On January 24, 2017, Olive Films released both seasons on DVD in Region 1.

== Awards and nominations ==
The pilot episode won the 1988 Emmy Award for Outstanding Directing in a Comedy Series.
