= Venus Butterfly =

Sexual technique

The Venus Butterfly is a term used for various sexual techniques, one of which was the subject of the 1988 book The One Hour Orgasm. It was first publicly mentioned in a 1986 episode of the American television drama L.A. Law. However, a technique of the same name appears in the book The Sensuous Woman, which was first published in 1969.

== L.A. Law television episode ==
In an episode of L.A. Law titled "The Venus Butterfly", which first aired on November 21, 1986, a man who is unimpressive in appearance and personality but who nevertheless has tremendous success with women claims to have a sexual technique that has caused this success. He reveals it to his lawyer, Stuart Markowitz (Michael Tucker). The technique itself is never described to the audience. In a hotel bedroom scene, it is implied that Markowitz uses the technique on his girlfriend, Ann Kelsey (Jill Eikenberry), with great positive effect. Jill Eikenberry is Michael Tucker's real-life wife; they have been married since 1973.

The writer of that section of the episode, Terry Louise Fisher, stated that she had just made it up. The show received many letters and phone calls from viewers asking what it was and two requests to license the term. Playboy magazine did a feature speculating on what the technique was and included suggestions from readers. Years later, actors on the show reported still being asked about it.

== Sue Johanson variation ==
As described by writer and sex educator Sue Johanson in 2005, the Venus Butterfly is a variant of cunnilingus. It involves using one's tongue on a woman's clitoris, using one's fingers on her vagina, and using the other hand in the perineal area, "even penetrating the rectum [i.e., anus] if that is pleasurable for her." A similar description was given in a 2004 episode of the TV series Rescue Me.

== See also ==
- Coitus reservatus
- Eroto-comatose lucidity
- Sex position
