= Acceptable Risks =

1986 television film by Rick Wallace

- Written by: Marvin A. Gluck
- Directed by: Rick Wallace
- Country of origin: United States
- Original language: English

Original release
- Release: 1986

Acceptable Risks is a 1986 television film directed by Rick Wallace and written by Marvin A. Gluck.

== Plot ==
The film is set in the fictional city of Oakbridge, where a housing development was built near a chemical plant. Due to poor planning and safety standards, there is an explosion at the chemical plant that releases poisonous chemicals into the environment in a major disaster.

== Reception ==
The film received mixed reviews from critics who noted its heavy-handed environmental messaging. Howard Rosenberg of the Los Angeles Times noted that the film drew inspiration from the real life Bhopal disaster of 1984.

== Cast ==
- Brian Dennehy as Dan Sheppard, the chemical plant manager
- Cicely Tyson as Janet Framm, an Oakbridge city planner
- Kenneth McMillan as Wes Boggs, the plant's maintenance manager
- Christine Ebersole as Lee Snyder, an employee of the plant
