= L.A. Law =

American legal drama television series (1986–1994)

- Genre: Legal drama Crime drama
- Created by: Steven Bochco; Terry Louise Fisher
- Starring: (See entire cast list below)
- Theme music composer: Mike Post
- Country of origin: United States
- Original language: English
- No. of seasons: 8
- No. of episodes: 172 (list of episodes)

Production
- Executive producers: Steven Bochco (seasons 1–3 & 6); David E. Kelley (seasons 4 & 5); Rick Wallace (seasons 5–7); Patricia Green (season 6); John Tinker (season 7); John Masius (season 7); William M. Finkelstein (seasons 7 & 8)
- Cinematography: Robert Seaman
- Editor: Bonnie Koehler
- Running time: 60 minutes (including commercials)
- Production companies: Steven Bochco Productions; 20th Century Fox Television

Original release
- Network: NBC
- Release: September 15, 1986 – May 19, 1994

Related
- L.A. Law: The Movie (2002); Civil Wars

L.A. Law is an American legal drama television series created by Steven Bochco and Terry Louise Fisher for NBC. It ran for eight seasons and 172 episodes from September 15, 1986, to May 19, 1994.

The series centers on the partners, associates and staff of a Los Angeles law firm. The show contains many of Bochco's trademark features, including an ensemble cast, large number of parallel story lines, social drama, and off-the-wall humor. It reflects the social and cultural conflicts that were occurring when the show was produced in the 1980s and early 1990s, and many of the cases featured on the show dealt with hot-button issues such as capital punishment, abortion, racism, homophobia, sexual harassment, HIV/AIDS, and domestic violence. The series often also reflects social tensions between the wealthy senior lawyer protagonists and their less well-paid junior staff.

In addition to its main cast, L.A. Law was also well known for featuring then-relatively unknown actors and actresses in guest starring roles, who went on to greater success in film and television, including Don Cheadle, Jeffrey Tambor, Kathy Bates, David Schwimmer, Shelley Hack, Jay O. Sanders, James Avery, Gates McFadden, Bryan Cranston, CCH Pounder, Kevin Spacey, Richard Schiff, Carrie-Anne Moss, William H. Macy, Stephen Root, Christian Slater, Steve Buscemi, and Lucy Liu. Several episodes of the show also included celebrities such as Vanna White, Buddy Hackett, and Mamie Van Doren appearing as themselves in cameo roles.

The show was a success with critics and audiences, ranking in the Nielsen Top 30 for its first six seasons and winning 15 Emmy Awards throughout its run, four of which were for Outstanding Drama Series.

== Synopsis ==
The series is set in and around the fictional Los Angeles–based law firm McKenzie, Brackman, Chaney and Kuzak (later McKenzie, Brackman, Chaney, Kuzak and Becker, later McKenzie, Brackman, Chaney, and Becker) and featured attorneys at the firm and various members of the support staff. The exteriors for the law firm were shot at the FourFortyFour South Flower building in downtown Los Angeles, which was known as the 444 Flower Building at the time. The opening credits sequence of every episode began with a close-up of a car trunk being slammed shut revealing a personalized license plate reading "LA LAW". For the first seven seasons, the model car used was a Jaguar XJ Series III; for the 8th and final season, the Jaguar was replaced with a 1993 Bentley Continental R. Both cars carried registration stickers indicating the year in which each season began. Two different musical openings for the show's theme were used: a saxophone riff for episodes that were lighter in tone; and an ominous synthesizer chord, for more serious story lines.

== Cast and characters ==
=== Cast timeline ===
Character	Actor	Seasons								
Character	Actor	1	2	3	4	5	6	7	8	Reunion
Michael Kuzak	Harry Hamlin	Main	Main	Main	Main	Main				Main
Arnie Becker	Corbin Bernsen	Main	Main	Main	Main	Main	Main	Main	Main	Main
Ann Kelsey	Jill Eikenberry	Main	Main	Main	Main	Main	Main	Main	Main	Main
Douglas Brackman Jr.	Alan Rachins	Main	Main	Main	Main	Main	Main	Main	Main	Main
Abby Perkins	Michele Greene	Main	Main	Main	Main	Main				Main
Victor Sifuentes	Jimmy Smits	Main	Main	Main	Main	Main	Guest			
Stuart Markowitz	Michael Tucker	Main	Main	Main	Main	Main	Main	Main	Main	Main
Roxanne Melman	Susan Ruttan	Main	Main	Main	Main	Main	Main	Main	Guest	Main
Leland McKenzie	Richard Dysart	Main	Main	Main	Main	Main	Main	Main	Main	Main
Grace Van Owen	Susan Dey	Main (Note: Dey is added to the cast from "Those Lips, That Eye" (ep. 1.2).)	Main	Main	Main	Main	Main			Main
Jonathan Rollins	Blair Underwood		Main	Main	Main	Main	Main	Main	Main	
Benny Stulwicz	Larry Drake	Guest	Recurring	Main	Main	Main	Main	Main	Main	Main
C.J. Lamb	Amanda Donohoe					Main (Note: Initially recurring, Donohoe and Spencer are added to the opening credits from "Splatoon" (ep. 5.9).)	Main			
Tommy Mullaney	John Spencer					Main	Main	Main	Main	
Zoey Clemmons	Cecil Hoffman					Main (Note: Initially recurring, Hoffman is added to the opening credits from "Mutinies on the Banzai" (ep. 5.17).)	Main	Recurring		
Gwen Taylor	Sheila Kelley				Guest	Recurring	Main	Main		
Frank Kittredge	Michael Cumpsty						Main (Note: Initially recurring, Cumpsty and Ferrell are added to the opening credits from "Diet, Diet, My Darling" (ep. 6.14).)			
Susan Bloom	Conchata Ferrell						Main			
Daniel Morales	A Martinez							Main	Main	
Melina Paros	Lisa Zane							Main (Note: Initially recurring, Zane is added to the opening credits from "Bare Witness" (ep. 7.11).)		
Eli Levinson	Alan Rosenberg								Main	Cameo
Denise Iannello	Debi Mazar								Main	
Jane Halliday	Alexandra Powers								Main	

Cast notes

=== Main characters ===
- Harry Hamlin as Michael Kuzak, partner (1986–91; seasons 1–5, reunion)
- Corbin Bernsen as Arnold "Arnie" Becker, partner (1986–94; seasons 1–8, reunion)
- Jill Eikenberry as Ann Kelsey, associate, partner (1986–94; seasons 1–8, reunion)
- Alan Rachins as Douglas Brackman, Jr., managing partner, interim senior partner (1986–94; seasons 1–8, reunion)
- Michele Greene as Abby Perkins, associate (1986–91; seasons 1–5, reunion)
- Jimmy Smits as Victor Sifuentes, associate (1986–91, 1992; seasons 1–5, guest season 6)
- Michael Tucker as Stuart Markowitz, associate, partner (1986–94; seasons 1–8, reunion)
- Susan Ruttan as Roxanne Melman, secretary, office administrator (1986–93; seasons 1–7, reunion, guest season 8)
- Richard Dysart as Leland McKenzie, senior partner (1986–94; seasons 1–8, reunion)
- Susan Dey as Grace van Owen, deputy district attorney, superior court judge, partner (1986–92; seasons 1–6, reunion)
- Blair Underwood as Jonathan Rollins, associate, partner (1987–94; seasons 2–8)
- Larry Drake as Benny Stulwicz (1987–94; seasons 3–8, reunion, guest season 1, recurring season 2)
- Amanda Donohoe as Cara Jean "C.J." Lamb, associate (1990–92; seasons 5–6)
- John Spencer as Tommy Mullaney, associate, assistant district attorney (1990–94; seasons 5–8)
- Cecil Hoffman as Zoey Clemmons, assistant district attorney (1991–92; seasons 5–7)
- Sheila Kelley as Gwen Taylor, secretary, law intern (1990–93; seasons 6–7, guest season 4, recurring season 5)
- Michael Cumpsty as Frank Kittredge, tenant (1991–92; season 6)
- Conchata Ferrell as Susan Bloom, tenant (1991–92; season 6)
- A Martinez as Daniel Morales, partner (1992–94; seasons 7–8)
- Lisa Zane as Melina Paros, associate (1992–93; season 7)
- Alan Rosenberg as Eli Levinson, partner (1993–94; season 8, reunion)
- Debi Mazar as Denise Iannello, secretary (1993–94; season 8)
- Alexandra Powers as Jane Halliday, associate (1993–94; season 8)

=== Recurring characters ===
- Patricia Huston as Hilda Brunschwager, Brackman's secretary (1986–88; seasons 1 & 2; recurring)
- Bernie Hern as Judge Sidney Schroeder (1986–87; seasons 1 & 2; 1991; season 5; recurring)
- John Hancock as Judge Richard Armand (1986–87; season 1; 1989–1991; seasons 4–6; recurring)
- Anne Haney as Judge Marilyn Travelini (1986–94; seasons 1–8; recurring)
- Cynthia Harris as Iris Hubbard, McKenzie's secretary and law intern (1986–87; season 1; recurring)
- George Coe as Judge Wallace R. Vance (1986–91; seasons 1–6; recurring)
- Jerry Hardin as D.A. Malcolm Gold (1986–92; seasons 1–6; recurring)
- Carmen Argenziano as Neil Robertson, a lawyer (1986–92; seasons 1–6; recurring)
- Michael Fairman as Judge Douglas McGrath (1986–94; seasons 1–8; recurring)
- Bruce Kirby as D.A. Bruce Rogoff (1986–91; seasons 1–5; recurring)
- Michael Holden as D.A. George Handleman (1987; 1992; seasons 1 & 6; recurring)
- Joanna Frank as Sheila Brackman, Douglas Brackman's wife (1987–88; seasons 1–3; 1992–94; seasons 6–8; recurring)
- Annie Abbott as Judge Janice L. Neiman (1987–94; seasons 2–8; recurring)
- Diane Delano as Rhonda Vasek (1987; season 2; recurring)
- Ellen Blake as Elizabeth Brand, Kuzak's secretary (1987–90; seasons 2–4; recurring)
- Jeff Silverman as Erroll Farrell (1987–88; season 2; recurring)
- Daniel Benzali as Judge Donald Phillips (1988; 1991–1993; season 2; seasons 5–7; recurring)
- Paul Regina as Felix Echeverria, a lawyer (1988–92; seasons 2–6; recurring)
- Don Sparks as Russell Spitzer, a lawyer (1988–93; seasons 2–7; recurring)
- Earl Boen as Judge Walter L. Swanson (1988–93; seasons 2–8; recurring)
- Leonard Stone as Judge Paul Hansen (1988; 1991–94; season 2; seasons 5–8; recurring)
- James Avery as Judge Michael Conover (1988–92; seasons 2–6 recurring)
- Raye Birk as Judge Steven Lang (1988–93; seasons 2–7; recurring)
- Dann Florek as Dave Meyer, a direct-mail businessman and Roxanne's husband (1988–93; seasons 2–8; recurring plus reunion film)
- Wayne Northrop as Bill Ringstrom (1988–89; season 3; recurring)
- Nancy Vawter as Dorothy Wyler, an associate (1988–89; season 3; recurring)
- Gerald Anthony as Ross Burnett (1988–89; season 3; recurring)
- Joyce Hyser as Allison Gottlieb, a filmmaker and Sifuentes' girlfriend (1989–90; seasons 3 & 4; recurring)
- Stan Kamber as Judge Harlan Shubow (1989–91; seasons 3–6; recurring)
- Renée Jones as Diana Moses, a law intern and Rollins' girlfriend (1989–90; seasons 3–5; recurring)
- Bruce Fairbairn as Sheldon Ganz, a lawyer (1989–92; seasons 3–7; recurring)
- Amanda Plummer as Alice Hackett, Benny Stulwicz' girlfriend (1989–90; seasons 3 & 4; recurring)
- Wayne Tippit as Leo Hackett, Alice's father (1989–90; seasons 3 & 4; recurring)
- Keith Mills as Judge Walter Green (1989–93; seasons 3–8; recurring)
- Jennifer Hetrick as Corrinne Hammond, Becker's wife (1989–91; seasons 4 & 5; recurring)
- Carl Lumbly as Dr. Earl Williams, a murder trial suspect and Kuzak's client (1989–90; season 4; recurring)
- Lorinne Vozoff as Judge Roberta Harbin (1989–92; seasons 4 & 6; recurring)
- Vonetta McGee as Jackie Williams, Earl's wife (1989–90; season 4; recurring)
- Veronica Cartwright as Margaret Flanagan, the assistant district attorney who prosecutes Earl Williams (1989–92; seasons 4 & 6; recurring)
- Diana Muldaur as Rosalind Shays, a ruthless, greedy and manipulative partner and the series' main antagonist (1989–91; seasons 4 & 5; recurring)
- Lillian Lehman as Judge Mary Harcourt (1989–94; seasons 4–8; recurring)
- Courtney Thorne-Smith as Kimberly Dugan, a cheerleader whom Kuzak dates (1990; season 4; recurring)
- Lawrence Dobkin as U.S. District Judge Saul Edelstein (1990–94; seasons 4–8; recurring)
- Concetta Tomei as Susan Hauber, a lawyer (1990–93; seasons 4–8; recurring)
- Vincent Gardenia as Murray Melman, Roxanne's estranged father (1990; seasons 4 & 5; recurring)
- Stanley Grover as Judge Richard Lobel (1990–94; seasons 4–8; recurring)
- Denis Arndt as Jack Sollers, a lawyer (1990–91; season 5; recurring)
- Tom Verica as Billy Castroverti, an associate (1991; seasons 5 & 6; recurring)
- Brad Sherwood as Ned Barron (1991–92; season 6; recurring)
- Lauren Lane as Julie Rayburn (1991–92; season 6; recurring)
- Lynne Thigpen as D.A. Ruby Thomas (1991–92; seasons 6 & 7 recurring)
- Anthony DeSando as Alex DePalma, an associate (1992; season 6; recurring)
- Alison Tucker as Sarah Alder, Stuart Markowitz's illegitimate daughter (1992; season 6; recurring)
- David Schwimmer as Dana Romney, a troublesome city attorney and minor antagonist (1992–93; season 7; recurring)
- Shelley Berman as Ben Flicker, a film studio mogul whom Becker does business with (1992–93; season 7; recurring)
- Anne Twomey as Linda Salerno, Gwen's homicidal stalker (1993; season 7; recurring)
- Joe Grifasi as Dominic Nuzzi, a gambler friend of Benny's (1993–94; seasons 7 & 8; recurring)
- Kathleen Wilhoite as Rosalie Hendrickson Stulwicz, a woman whom Benny dates and later marries (1993–94; seasons 7 & 8; recurring)
- Steven Eckholdt as Patrick Flanagan, a charismatic, but unethical and manipulative associate and a minor antagonist for the final episodes (1994; season 8; recurring)

== Series history ==
Season	Episodes	Originally released	
Season	Episodes	First released	Last released
1	23	September 15, 1986	April 9, 1987
2	20	October 15, 1987	May 5, 1988
3	19	November 3, 1988	May 18, 1989
4	22	November 2, 1989	May 17, 1990
5	22	October 18, 1990	May 16, 1991
6	22	October 10, 1991	May 21, 1992
7	22	October 22, 1992	May 27, 1993
8	22	October 7, 1993	May 19, 1994

L.A. Law's two-hour pilot movie aired on Monday, September 15, 1986. An encore aired in place of Saturday Night Live on September 27, 1986, being a rare scripted rerun in that late-night slot.

The original time period was Friday, 10:00 p.m., following Miami Vice, but after struggling there, it assumed NBC's prized Thursday, 10:00 p.m. (9:00 p.m. Central) time slot in the Must See TV primetime block from another Bochco-produced show, Hill Street Blues (from which Bochco had been dismissed at the end of that show's fifth season by then-MTM President Arthur Price). The show was itself eventually replaced by another hit ensemble drama, ER.

Co-creator Terry Louise Fisher was fired from the series in season 2 and filed a well-publicized lawsuit with Bochco and the studio that resulted in a settlement. Bochco and Fisher had also co-created the 1987 John Ritter series Hooperman for ABC.

The scene in season 5 where Leland McKenzie (Richard Dysart) was shown in bed with his enemy Rosalind Shays (Diana Muldaur) was ranked as the 38th greatest moment in television (the list originally appeared in an issue of EGG Magazine). The episode "Good to the Last Drop" in which Rosalind met her demise—falling into an open elevator shaft—was ranked No. 91 on TV Guide's 100 Greatest Episodes of All Time. It was referenced in The Star Trek Encyclopedia (prior to L.A. Law, Muldaur had played Dr. Katherine Pulaski during season 2 of Star Trek: The Next Generation) in which Pulaski's biography says: "There is no truth to the rumor that an ancestor of Dr. Pulaski was killed falling down the elevator shaft at a prestigious Los Angeles law firm."

After co-writing the feature film, From the Hip, Boston attorney David E. Kelley was hired by Bochco during the first season of L.A. Law. Kelley went on to critical and commercial success as show-runner of the series before leaving to create Picket Fences. While on L.A. Law, Kelley and Bochco co-created Doogie Howser, M.D. as the first Steven Bochco Productions series for a major, ten-series deal with ABC. Shortly thereafter, Bochco was offered the job as President of ABC Entertainment, but he turned it down.

At the height of the show's popularity in the late-1980s, attention was focused upon a fictitious sex position named the "Venus Butterfly" in season 1. The only clue describing the technique was a vague reference to "ordering room service". Fans and interested persons flooded the show's producers with letters asking for more details about this mysterious technique.

The show won GLAAD's first Media Award for Outstanding Drama Series in 1990, which it shared with Heartbeat. The first lesbian kiss on television occurred on the show in 1991 ("He's a Crowd", Season 5, Episode 12), between the characters of C.J. Lamb (played by Amanda Donohoe) and Abby (Michele Greene).

The show tied itself into the events of the Los Angeles riots of 1992, which were prompted by the acquittal of four white police officers who were put on trial for the videotaped beating of black motorist Rodney King. In a scene reminiscent of the Attack on Reginald Denny, tax attorney Stuart Markowitz is struck on the head by a rioter, and ends up having serious head injuries, causing a number of problems for him and his wife for several episodes as a result. Partner Douglas Brackman is also arrested in the mayhem of the riots as he is on his way to get remarried.

After the fifth season, Kelley left the show. Patricia Green and Rick Wallace were his replacements as executive producer. Green was the main creative force. Her character additions amid cast turnover were met with mixed reaction. She left the show in January 1992. Kelley and Bochco returned to write episodes and Bochco moved back to executive producer from consultant while Kelley stayed consultant. Bochco left the executive producer position after the sixth season and John Tinker and John Masius were brought in to run the seventh season. Kelley exited as consultant. Amid plummeting ratings during the seventh season, co-executive producers John Tinker & John Masius were fired midseason, and while the show went on hiatus, William M. Finkelstein was brought in to fix it. Tinker and Masius had brought a whimsical, soap-operatic tone to the series for which they had been known on St. Elsewhere. Dan Castellaneta (the voice of Homer Simpson) appeared in a Homer costume and hired the attorneys in the seventh-season premiere. That episode also reflected on the 1992 Los Angeles riots. Finkelstein reined in the series, returning to the serious legal cases that made the series famous.

In the eighth and final season, the characters of Eli Levinson (Alan Rosenberg) and Denise Iannello (Debi Mazar) were transplanted from the canceled Bochco legal series Civil Wars. Eli Levinson was revealed to be Stuart Markowitz's cousin. During the final season, the series went on hiatus in January 1994 to launch the second season of Homicide: Life on the Street. When that series succeeded wildly with a guest appearance by Robin Williams, it was expected that L.A. Law would conclude that May and Homicide: Life on the Street would succeed it on Thursdays in the fall. However, ER tested so well that Warner Bros. executives campaigned network president Warren Littlefield to give that series the prized Thursday slot.

The series ended in 1994 with NBC not renewing the show for a ninth season at the last minute; ending the show without a proper finale or wrapping up story lines. Bochco envisioned the show being repackaged into an occasional television film; a reunion show titled L.A. Law: The Movie would air in 2002 and featured most of the main cast from the series.

On August 4, 2020, Hamlin, Dey, Smits, Bernsen, Rachins, Greene and Underwood reunited on the Stars in the House video podcast to raise money for The Actors Fund. It was the first time Hamlin and Smits appeared together in 30 years. Some cast members had also reunited earlier that year virtually in June as part of a Wizard World virtual experience.

Reruns were shown on Lifetime and later A&E during the 1990s and 2000s. In the U.K. the show reaired on Granada Plus and ITV 3.

== Reception ==
Any lawyer who doesn't watch L.A. Law the night before he's going to trial is a fool.

— A New York attorney, on the show's influence on juries

Because of its popularity, L.A. Law had great influence on how Americans viewed the law and lawyers. The New York Times described it as "television's most serious attempt to date to portray American law and the people who practice it ... L.A. Law, perhaps more than any other force, has come to shape public perceptions about lawyers and the legal system". Attorneys reported that the show had affected how they dressed and spoke to juries (and, possibly, how those juries decided cases), and clients came to expect that cases could be tried and decided within a week. The number of applicants to law school rose because of how it glamorized the profession (including, as one law school dean stated, "the infinite possibilities for sex"), professors used L.A. Law as a teaching aid to discuss with their students legal issues raised in episodes, and law journal articles analysed the meaning of its plotlines. The show reportedly taught future lawyers things law school did not, such as time management and how to negotiate, and an attorney stated that the show accurately depicted life at a small law firm.

One law professor wrote in the Yale Law Journal that L.A. Law "has conveyed more 'bytes' of information (truthful or not), more images about lawyers, than all the Legal Studies programs, all the op-ed pieces, all the PBS shows put together." The show was "a massive distortion of reality ... the lawyers of L.A. Law are caricatures", he stated, but "caricatures are always caricatures of something, and that has to be real". Another wrote in the issue that the show "subtracts eighty to ninety-nine percent of lawyers' real work lives" and overemphasized the glamour of the rest. Unlike other works of legal fiction such as Perry Mason and Presumed Innocent, however, which are essentially mysteries that lawyers solve, L.A. Law's plots taught its tens of millions of viewers torts, ethics, and other basic legal ideas and dilemmas that comprise the first year of a legal education.

== Home media ==
Revelation Films has released all eight seasons of L.A. Law on DVD in the UK (Region 2). This is the first time the show has been released on DVD anywhere in the world.

On April 18, 2016, Revelation Films released L.A. Law – The Complete Collection on DVD in the UK. The 46-disc box set features all 171 episodes of the series in special collectors packaging.

In Region 1, Shout! Factory has released the first three seasons on DVD.

From November 2023 to October 2026, all episodes of the series were available to stream on Hulu in remastered HD format. They were also previously available for periods of time on Amazon Prime Video and the related free streaming service previously known as IMDB TV.

DVD name	Ep#	Release dates	
DVD name	Ep#	Region 1	Region 2
Season One	22	February 25, 2014	January 23, 2012
Season Two	20	May 20, 2014	June 4, 2012
Season Three	19	September 23, 2014	September 17, 2012
Season Four	22	N/A	February 11, 2013
Season Five	22	N/A	August 19, 2013
Season Six	22	N/A	November 25, 2013
Season Seven	22	N/A	March 21, 2016
Season Eight	22	N/A	March 21, 2016
Complete Series	171	N/A	April 18, 2016

== Canceled sequel series ==
In December 2020, it was reported that a sequel to the series was in development at ABC. Blair Underwood was set to reprise his role as Rollins and would also have served as executive producer. The sequel would have been produced by Steven Bochco Productions and 20th Television, with Bochco's widow Dayna and son Jesse co-executive producing. Marc Guggenheim and Ubah Mohamed were set to write and Anthony Hemingway direct. In October 2021, the series was given a pilot order. The same month, Corbin Bernsen joined the sequel series, reprising his role of Arnie Becker. In January 2022, Toks Olagundoye, Hari Nef and Ian Duff joined the cast. In February 2022, John Harlan Kim, Juliana Harkavy, and Kacey Rohl joined the cast. In May 2022, ABC announced that the sequel series would not be moving forward.

== Accolades ==
The show won numerous awards, including 15 Emmy Awards. It won the Emmy for Outstanding Drama Series in 1987, 1989, 1990 and 1991. It was also nominated for the award in 1988 and 1992. Some of the actors, including Richard Dysart, Larry Drake and Jimmy Smits, also received Emmys for their performances. The series shares the Emmy Award record for most acting nominations by regular cast members (excluding the guest performer category) for a single series in one year with Hill Street Blues, The West Wing and Game of Thrones

For the 1988–1989 season, nine cast members were nominated for Emmys. Larry Drake was the only one to win (for Supporting Actor). The others nominated were: Jimmy Smits and Richard Dysart (for Supporting Actor); Michael Tucker (for Lead Actor); Jill Eikenberry and Susan Dey (both for Lead Actress); and Amanda Donohoe, Susan Ruttan, and Michele Greene (all for Supporting Actress).

The series won a Latino Image Award.

It was listed as number 42 on Entertainment Weekly's list of The New Classics in the July 4, 2008 issue.

=== Primetime Emmy Awards ===
Year	Category	Nominee(s)	Episode(s)	Result
1987	Outstanding Drama Series	Steven Bochco, Gregory Hoblit, Terry Louise Fisher, Ellen S. Pressman, Scott Goldstein, Phillip M. Goldfarb		Won
1987	Outstanding Directing for a Drama Series	Gregory Hoblit	"Pilot"	Won
1987	Outstanding Directing for a Drama Series	Donald Petrie	"The Venus Butterfly"	Nominated
1987	Outstanding Writing for a Drama Series	Steven Bochco & Terry Louise Fisher	"The Venus Butterfly"	Won
1987	Outstanding Writing for a Drama Series	William M. Finkelstein	"Sidney, the Dead-Nosed Reindeer"	Nominated
1987	Outstanding Lead Actor in a Drama Series	Corbin Bernsen		Nominated
1987	Outstanding Lead Actress in a Drama Series	Susan Dey		Nominated
1987	Outstanding Lead Actress in a Drama Series	Jill Eikenberry		Nominated
1987	Outstanding Supporting Actor in a Drama Series	Jimmy Smits		Nominated
1987	Outstanding Supporting Actor in a Drama Series	Michael Tucker		Nominated
1987	Outstanding Supporting Actress in a Drama Series	Susan Ruttan		Nominated
1987	Outstanding Guest Performer in a Drama Series	Alfre Woodard	"Pilot"	Won
1987	Outstanding Guest Performer in a Drama Series	Jeanne Cooper	"Fry Me to the Moon"	Nominated
1987	Outstanding Art Direction for a Series	Jeffrey L. Goldstein, Richard D. Kent	"Pilot"	Won
1988	Outstanding Drama Series	Steven Bochco, Gregory Hoblit, Rick Wallace, Terry Louise Fisher, Scott Goldstein, David E. Kelley and Phillip M. Goldfarb		Nominated
1988	Outstanding Directing for a Drama Series	Gregory Hoblit	"The Wizard of Odds"	Nominated
1988	Outstanding Directing for a Drama Series	Kim Friedman	"Hand Roll Express"	Nominated
1988	Outstanding Directing for a Drama Series	Win Phelps	"Full Marital Jacket"	Nominated
1988	Outstanding Directing for a Drama Series	Sam Weisman	"Beauty and Obese"	Nominated
1988	Outstanding Writing for a Drama Series	Terry Louise Fisher & David E. Kelley	"Beauty and Obese"	Nominated
1988	Outstanding Writing for a Drama Series	Terry Louise Fisher, David E. Kelley & Steven Bochco	"Full Marital Jacket"	Nominated
1988	Outstanding Lead Actor in a Drama Series	Corbin Bernsen		Nominated
1988	Outstanding Lead Actor in a Drama Series	Michael Tucker		Nominated
1988	Outstanding Lead Actress in a Drama Series	Susan Dey		Nominated
1988	Outstanding Lead Actress in a Drama Series	Jill Eikenberry		Nominated
1988	Outstanding Supporting Actor in a Drama Series	Larry Drake	"Full Marital Jacket"	Won
1988	Outstanding Supporting Actor in a Drama Series	Jimmy Smits		Nominated
1988	Outstanding Supporting Actor in a Drama Series	Alan Rachins		Nominated
1988	Outstanding Supporting Actress in a Drama Series	Susan Ruttan	"Leaping Lizards"	Nominated
1988	Outstanding Editing for a Series - Single Camera Production	Elodie Keene	"Full Marital Jacket"	Won
1988	Outstanding Editing for a Series - Single Camera Production	Quinnie Martin Jr.	"Divorce with Extreme Prejudice"	Nominated
1989	Outstanding Drama Series	Steven Bochco, Rick Wallace, David E. Kelley, Scott Goldstein, Michele Gallery, William M. Finkelstein, Judith Parker, Phillip M. Goldfarb and Alice West		Won
1989	Outstanding Directing for a Drama Series	Eric Laneuville	"I'm In The Nude For Love"	Nominated
1989	Outstanding Directing for a Drama Series	John Pasquin	"To Live And Diet In L.A."	Nominated
1989	Outstanding Writing for a Drama Series	Steven Bochco, David E. Kelley, William M. Finkelstein & Michele Gallery	"His Suit Is Hirsute"	Nominated
1989	Outstanding Writing for a Drama Series	David E. Kelley	"I'm In The Nude For Love"	Nominated
1989	Outstanding Writing for a Drama Series	David E. Kelley, William M. Finkelstein, Michele Gallery & Judith Parker	"Urine Trouble Now"	Nominated
1989	Outstanding Lead Actor in a Drama Series	Michael Tucker		Nominated
1989	Outstanding Lead Actress in a Drama Series	Susan Dey		Nominated
1989	Outstanding Lead Actress in a Drama Series	Jill Eikenberry		Nominated
1989	Outstanding Supporting Actor in a Drama Series	Larry Drake	"America the Beautiful"	Won
1989	Outstanding Supporting Actor in a Drama Series	Jimmy Smits		Nominated
1989	Outstanding Supporting Actor in a Drama Series	Richard Dysart		Nominated
1989	Outstanding Supporting Actress in a Drama Series	Susan Ruttan	"Romancing The Drone"	Nominated
1989	Outstanding Supporting Actress in a Drama Series	Amanda Plummer	"Urine Trouble Now"	Nominated
1989	Outstanding Supporting Actress in a Drama Series	Michele Greene	"America The Beautiful"	Nominated
1990	Outstanding Drama Series	David E. Kelley, Rick Wallace, William M. Finkelstein, Elodie Keene, Michael M. Robin, Alice West and Robert Breech		Won
1990	Outstanding Directing for a Drama Series	Win Phelps	"Noah's Bark"	Nominated
1990	Outstanding Directing for a Drama Series	Rick Wallace	"The Last Gasp"	Nominated
1990	Outstanding Writing for a Drama Series	David E. Kelley	"Blood, Sweat & Fears"	Won
1990	Outstanding Writing for a Drama Series	David E. Kelley & William M. Finkelstein	"Bang... Zoom... Zap"	Nominated
1990	Outstanding Lead Actress in a Drama Series	Jill Eikenberry		Nominated
1990	Outstanding Supporting Actor in a Drama Series	Jimmy Smits	"Blood, Sweat and Fears"	Won
1990	Outstanding Supporting Actor in a Drama Series	Larry Drake		Nominated
1990	Outstanding Supporting Actor in a Drama Series	Richard Dysart		Nominated
1990	Outstanding Supporting Actress in a Drama Series	Susan Ruttan	"The Good Human Bar"	Nominated
1990	Outstanding Supporting Actress in a Drama Series	Diana Muldaur	"Whatever Happened to Hannah?"	Nominated
1991	Outstanding Drama Series	David E. Kelley, Rick Wallace, Patricia Green, John Hill, Robert Breech, James C. Hart, Elodie Keene, Alan Brennert and Alice West		Won
1991	Outstanding Directing for a Drama Series	Tom Moore	"God Rest Ye Murray Gentleman"	Nominated
1991	Outstanding Writing for a Drama Series	David E. Kelley	"On The Toad Again"	Won
1991	Outstanding Writing for a Drama Series	Judith Feldman & Sarah Woodside Gallagher	"Lie Harder"	Nominated
1991	Outstanding Writing for a Drama Series	David E. Kelley, Patricia Green & Alan Brennert	"Mutinies On The Banzai"	Nominated
1991	Outstanding Supporting Actor in a Drama Series	Jimmy Smits	"God Rest Ye Murray Gentleman"	Nominated
1991	Outstanding Supporting Actor in a Drama Series	Richard Dysart	"The Beverly Hills Hangers"	Nominated
1991	Outstanding Supporting Actress in a Drama Series	Diana Muldaur	"He's a Crowd"	Nominated
1991	Outstanding Guest Actor in a Drama Series	John Glover	"God Rest Ye Murray Gentleman"	Nominated
1992	Outstanding Drama Series	Steven Bochco, Rick Wallace, Patricia Green, Alan Brennert, Carol Flint, Elodie Keene, James C. Hart, Robert Breech and Don Behrns		Nominated
1992	Outstanding Directing for a Drama Series	Rick Wallace	"Say Goodnight Gracie"	Nominated
1992	Outstanding Supporting Actor in a Drama Series	Richard Dysart	"Monkey on My Back Lot"	Won
1992	Outstanding Supporting Actor in a Drama Series	Jimmy Smits	"Say Goodnight Gracie"	Nominated
1992	Outstanding Supporting Actress in a Drama Series	Conchata Ferrell	"P.S. Your Shrink Is Dead"	Nominated
1994	Outstanding Supporting Actress in a Drama Series	Jill Eikenberry	"Safe Sex"	Nominated

=== Golden Globe Awards ===
Year	Category	Nominee(s)	Result
1987	Best Television Series – Drama		Won
1988	Best Television Series – Drama		Won
1988	Best Performance by an Actor in a Television Series – Drama	Harry Hamlin	Nominated
1988	Best Performance by an Actor in a Television Series – Drama	Michael Tucker	Nominated
1988	Best Performance by an Actress in a Television Series – Drama	Susan Dey	Won
1988	Best Performance by an Actress in a Television Series – Drama	Jill Eikenberry	Nominated
1988	Best Performance by an Actor in a Supporting Role in a Series, Mini-Series or Motion Picture Made for Television	Alan Rachins	Nominated
1989	Best Television Series – Drama		Nominated
1989	Best Performance by an Actor in a Television Series – Drama	Harry Hamlin	Nominated
1989	Best Performance by an Actor in a Television Series – Drama	Corbin Bernsen	Nominated
1989	Best Performance by an Actress in a Television Series – Drama	Susan Dey	Nominated
1989	Best Performance by an Actress in a Television Series – Drama	Jill Eikenberry	Won
1989	Best Performance by an Actor in a Supporting Role in a Series, Mini-Series or Motion Picture Made for Television	Larry Drake	Nominated
1989	Best Performance by an Actress in a Supporting Role in a Series, Mini-Series or Motion Picture Made for Television	Susan Ruttan	Nominated
1990	Best Television Series – Drama		Nominated
1990	Best Performance by an Actor in a Television Series – Drama	Harry Hamlin	Nominated
1990	Best Performance by an Actor in a Television Series – Drama	Corbin Bernsen	Nominated
1990	Best Performance by an Actress in a Television Series – Drama	Susan Dey	Nominated
1990	Best Performance by an Actress in a Television Series – Drama	Jill Eikenberry	Nominated
1990	Best Performance by an Actor in a Supporting Role in a Series, Mini-Series or Motion Picture Made for Television	Larry Drake	Nominated
1990	Best Performance by an Actor in a Supporting Role in a Series, Mini-Series or Motion Picture Made for Television	Michael Tucker	Nominated
1990	Best Performance by an Actress in a Supporting Role in a Series, Mini-Series or Motion Picture Made for Television	Susan Ruttan	Nominated
1991	Best Television Series – Drama		Nominated
1991	Best Performance by an Actress in a Television Series – Drama	Susan Dey	Nominated
1991	Best Performance by an Actress in a Television Series – Drama	Jill Eikenberry	Nominated
1991	Best Performance by an Actor in a Supporting Role in a Series, Mini-Series or Motion Picture Made for Television	Jimmy Smits	Nominated
1991	Best Performance by an Actor in a Supporting Role in a Series, Mini-Series or Motion Picture Made for Television	Blair Underwood	Nominated
1992	Best Television Series – Drama		Nominated
1992	Best Performance by an Actress in a Television Series – Drama	Susan Dey	Nominated
1992	Best Performance by an Actor in a Supporting Role in a Series, Mini-Series or Motion Picture Made for Television	Larry Drake	Nominated
1992	Best Performance by an Actress in a Supporting Role in a Series, Mini-Series or Motion Picture Made for Television	Amanda Donohoe	Won

=== Directors Guild of America Awards ===
Year	Category	Nominee	Episode	Result
1986	Outstanding Directing for a Drama Series	Donald Petrie	"The Venus Butterfly"	Nominated
1989	Outstanding Directing for a Drama Series	Eric Laneuville	"I'm In The Nude For Love"	Won
1989	Outstanding Directing for a Drama Series	Gabrielle Beaumont	"Lie Down and Deliver"	Nominated
1989	Outstanding Directing for a Drama Series	John Pasquin	"To Live And Diet In L.A."	Nominated

=== Writers Guild of America Awards ===
Year	Category	Episode(s)	Nominees(s)	Result
1987	Episodic Drama	"Fry Me to the Moon"	Jacob Epstein, Marshall Goldberg and David E. Kelley	Nominated
1987	Episodic Drama	"The Venus Butterfly"	Steven Bochco and Terry Louise Fisher	Nominated
1988	Episodic Drama	"Full Marital Jacket"	Terry Louise Fisher, David E. Kelley and Steven Bochco	Nominated
1989	Episodic Drama	"His Suite is Hirsute"	Steven Bochco, David E. Kelley, Michele Gallery and William M. Finkelstein	Nominated
1990	Episodic Drama	"Bang...Zoom...Zap"	David E. Kelley and William M. Finkelstein	Nominated
1990	Episodic Drama	"Justice Swerved"	David E. Kelley and Bryce Zabel	Nominated
