= Roe vs. Wade (film) =

1989 television film by Gregory Hoblit

- VHS release promotion
- Genre: Biography; Drama
- Written by: Alison Cross
- Directed by: Gregory Hoblit
- Starring: Holly Hunter; Amy Madigan
- Music by: W. G. Snuffy Walden
- Country of origin: United States
- Original language: English

Production
- Producers: Gregory Hoblit; Alison Cross; Michael Manheim
- Cinematography: Newton Thomas Sigel
- Editors: Joe Ann Fogle; Elodie Keene
- Running time: 100 minutes
- Production companies: NBC Productions; The Manheim Company

Original release
- Network: NBC
- Release: May 15, 1989

Roe vs. Wade is a 1989 television film directed by Gregory Hoblit about the landmark 1973 United States Supreme Court decision Roe v. Wade. It was written by Alison Cross and stars Holly Hunter and Amy Madigan.

== Plot ==
Ellen Russell is a lonely, single, poorly educated Texan who finds herself pregnant with no means to support a child. To avoid giving up the child, she seeks an abortion. Denied an abortion in Texas, the young woman hires a novice lawyer to plead her case in the U.S. Supreme Court.

== Cast ==
- Holly Hunter as Ellen Russell
- Amy Madigan as Sarah Weddington
- James Gammon as Jimmy Russell
- Dion Anderson as Bob Flowers
- Kathy Bates as Jessie
- Chris Mulkey as Ron Weddington
- Terry O'Quinn as Jay Floyd
- Stephen Tobolowsky as Darryl Horwood
- Alycia Grant as Sherry Roe

== Release ==
The film aired on NBC on May 15, 1989. It was the tenth most viewed primetime television show for the week, with a 17.0 Nielsen rating, and seen in an estimated 15.3 million homes.

== Awards ==
Award	Category	Nominee(s)	Result
Primetime Emmy Awards	Outstanding Drama/Comedy Special	Michael Manheim, Gregory Hoblit, Alison Cross	Won
Primetime Emmy Awards	Outstanding Lead Actress in a Miniseries or Special	Holly Hunter	Won
Primetime Emmy Awards	Outstanding Lead Actress in a Miniseries or Special	Amy Madigan	Nominated
Primetime Emmy Awards	Outstanding Directing in a Miniseries or Special	Gregory Hoblit	Nominated
Primetime Emmy Awards	Outstanding Editing for a Miniseries or a Special - Single Camera Production	Elodie Keane, Joe Ann Foegle	Nominated
Primetime Emmy Awards	Outstanding Writing in a Miniseries or Special	Alison Cross	Nominated
Golden Globe Awards	Best Miniseries or Motion Picture Made for Television	Michael Manheim, Gregory Hoblit, Alison Cross	Nominated
Golden Globe Awards	Best Performance by an Actress - Miniseries or Television Movie	Holly Hunter	Nominated
Golden Globe Awards	Best Performance by an Actress in a Supporting Role - Miniseries or Television Movie	Amy Madigan	Won
