= Judith Feldman =

American television producer and writer

Judith Feldman is an American television producer and writer. She worked as an executive story editor and writer for L.A. Law and was nominated for an Emmy Award for her work on the episode "Lie Harder". She went on to work as a producer and writer for Family Law and The Division. She often collaborates with Sarah Woodside Gallagher.

== Awards and nominations ==
Year	Awarding body	Category	Result	Work	Notes
1991	Emmy Award	Outstanding Writing for a Drama Series	Nominated	L.A. Law episode "Lie Harder"	Shared with co-writer Sarah Woodside Gallagher
