= Rick Wallace =

American television director (born 1948)

- Born: Richard C. Wallace; February 12, 1948 (age 77); Chicago, Illinois, U.S.
- Occupation: Writer
- Spouse: Lillian D'Arc
- Children: 3

Rick Wallace (born February 12, 1948) is an American film director and television producer. He has worked on Smallville, L.A. Law, Doogie Howser, M.D. and The Closer, as well as many other programs.

== Partial filmography ==
=== Director ===
- The Closer
- Women's Murder Club
- Men in Trees (2006)
- Commander in Chief (2005)
- Law & Order: Special Victims Unit (2003)
- Smallville (2001)
- NYPD Blue
- Las Vegas
- L.A. Law (1990)
- Doogie Howser, M.D.
- City of Angels
- Medical Investigation
- Law & Order
- Philly
- Bay City Blues
- Karen Sisco
- Ed
- Murder One
- Martial Law
- Law & Order: Criminal Intent
- Beggars and Choosers
- The Pretender
- Early Edition
- Nash Bridges
- Acceptable Risks (1986)
- Fantasy Island
- Hill Street Blues

=== Producer ===
- Major Crimes (2012-2015)
- The Closer (2005-2012)
- Men in Trees (2006)
- The Pretender (1996)
- Doogie Howser, M.D. (1989)
- L.A. Law (1988–1993)
