= Terry Louise Fisher =

American television screenwriter and producer (1946–2025)

- Born: February 21, 1946; Chicago, Illinois, U.S.
- Died: June 10, 2025 (aged 79); Laguna Hills, California, U.S.
- Education: UCLA School of Law
- Occupations: Screenwriter; producer
- Years active: 1982–2002

Terry Louise Fisher (February 21, 1946 – June 10, 2025) was an American television screenwriter and producer. During her career, she won three Primetime Emmy Awards from seven nominations.

== Early career ==
Fisher was born in Chicago, Illinois and attended UCLA School of Law in 1968. She later worked for the Los Angeles District Attorney's office and moved from that into entertainment law. While a Los Angeles lawyer, Fisher wrote two novels, both published by the Warner Publishing Company. The first, entitled A Class Act, was published in 1976. The second, entitled Good Behavior, was published in 1979. Both are no longer in print. After ten years in the law field, Fisher decided to pursue her true passion of writing full-time and quit practicing law.

== Television career ==
=== Early years ===
Fisher began her television career as a writer and producer for the CBS police procedural Cagney & Lacey in 1982. Between 1983 and 1987, she wrote for other series and television films. In 1985, she left Cagney & Lacey, but returned many years later for the series' reunion films Cagney and Lacey: The Return (1994) and Cagney and Lacey: Together Again (1995), both of which she co-wrote.

=== L.A. Law ===
Fisher's most notable series was L.A. Law, which she co-created with producer Steven Bochco. She served as a supervising producer and writer for many of the series' early episodes. Her writing for the series won her a shared Primetime Emmy Award in 1987, and two additional shared nominations in 1988.

In 1988, a legal battle with Steven Bochco led to her departure from the series, when a negotiation for her to take over Bochco's role as the series' executive producer failed, and she was banned from the set.

Prior to this, she had also co-created the comedy-drama series Hooperman with Bochco in 1987. The series starred John Ritter and ran for two seasons on ABC. During the time, she had signed a feature agreement (by way of Fisher Entertainment Group) with The Walt Disney Studios in 1987.

=== Post-L.A. Law ===
Fisher wrote the 1992 short-lived summer series 2000 Malibu Road, which was produced by Aaron Spelling and directed by Joel Schumacher. She later took part in the production of a highly anticipated primetime soap opera pilot, entitled Daughters of Eve, which was to star Sophia Loren and premiere during the 1995-1996 television season. However, the series was not picked up.

== Death ==
Fisher died in Laguna Hills, California on June 10, 2025, at the age of 79.
