= Gregory Hoblit =

American film and television director (born 1944)

- Born: Gregory King Hoblit; November 27, 1944 (age 81); Abilene, Texas, U.S.
- Occupations: Film director; television director; television producer
- Years active: 1974–present
- Spouse: Debrah Farentino (m. 1994; div. 2009)

Gregory Hoblit (born November 27, 1944) is an American film director, television director and television producer. He is known for directing the feature films Primal Fear (1996), Fallen (1998), Frequency (2000), Hart's War (2002), Fracture (2007), and Untraceable (2008). He has won nine Emmy Awards for directing and producing, an accolade which includes work on the television series Hill Street Blues, NYPD Blue, L.A. Law, and Hooperman, and the television film Roe vs. Wade.

== Early life and education ==
Hoblit was born Gregory King Hoblit in Abilene, Texas, on November 27, 1944, the son of Elizabeth Hubbard King and Harold Foster Hoblit, an FBI agent. Hoblit studied at both the University of California, Berkeley and University of California, Los Angeles, obtaining bachelor's degrees in history and political science.

== Career ==
Hoblit was "[a] longtime associate of Steven Bochco, the late, celebrated writer and producer of television police and courtroom dramas. Much of Hoblit's work is oriented towards police, attorneys, and legal cases. An element of career that has been noted by the entertainment media is the casting of young talent into serious roles that have elevated them to stardom (e.g., for Edward Norton and Ryan Gosling).

Hoblit is known for directing the feature films Primal Fear (1996), Fallen (1998), Frequency (2000), Hart's War (2002), Fracture (2007), and Untraceable (2008).

As described by Jerry Roberts in the 2009 edition of his Encyclopedia of Television Film Directors, Hoblit's directing included episodes of Bay City Blues, Hill Street Blues, NYPD Blue, Cop Rock, L.A. Law, among other television series. His credits also include having directed the science fiction police drama, NYPD 2069 (2004), which was described as "unaired" as of that date. He also wrote an episode of Hill Street Blues.

== Personal life ==
Hoblit married actress Debrah Farentino on September 10, 1994. The couple have two children, Molly and Sophie.

== Awards and recognition ==
Hoblit has won nine Emmy Awards for directing and producing, an accolade which includes six for producing episodes of the television series Hill Street Blues (1981-1984), L.A. Law (1987), Hooperman (1988), and NYPD Blue (1995); the Emmy for L.A. Law was for the pilot episode. The 1981 Emmy for his work on Hill Street Blues was for Outstanding Drama Series, and his fellow awardees were Steven Bochco and Michael Kozoll.

He was further recognized as a producer with an Emmy for the television film Roe vs. Wade (1989).

== Filmography ==
Film

Year	Title	Director	Producer
1974	Goodnight Jackie	No	Yes
1996	Primal Fear	Yes	No
1998	Fallen	Yes	No
2000	Frequency	Yes	Yes
2002	Hart's War	Yes	Yes
2007	Fracture	Yes	No
2008	Untraceable	Yes	No

TV movies

Year	Title	Director	Producer
1978	Loose Change	No	Yes
1978	Dr. Strange	No	Yes
1979	Vampiro	No	Yes
1981	Every Stray Dog and Kid	No	Yes
1989	Roe vs. Wade	Yes	Yes
1993	Class of '61	Yes	No

TV series

Year	Title	Director	Producer	Writer	Notes
1978	What Really Happened to the Class of '65?	No	No	Yes	1 episode
1979	Paris	No	Yes	No	
1981–1985	Hill Street Blues	Yes	Yes	Yes	45 episodes
1983	Bay City Blues	Yes	Yes	No	1 episode
1986–1988	L.A. Law	Yes	Yes	No	35 episodes
1987	Hooperman	Yes	No	No	2 episodes
1990	Equal Justice	Yes	No	No	1 episode
1990	Cop Rock	Yes	No	No	2 episodes
1993–1994	NYPD Blue	Yes	Yes	No	9 episodes
2004	NYPD 2069	Yes	Yes	No	1 episode
2009	Solving Charlie	Yes	No	No	1 episode
2013	Monday Mornings	Yes	No	No	1 episode
2014	The Americans	Yes	No	No	1 episode
2015	The Strain	Yes	No	No	1 episode
