= Kim Friedman =

American television director and producer

- Born: November 14, 1949 (age 76)
- Occupations: Television director and producer
- Years active: 1977–2014

Kim Friedman (born November 14, 1949) is an American television director and producer.

Friedman's TV career began by directing 70 episodes of the sitcom, Mary Hartman, Mary Hartman for Norman Lear. She then moved on to directing the pilot for and episodes of Square Pegs, followed by episodes of L.A. Law, The Love Boat, Dynasty, A Different World, Head of the Class, Beverly Hills, 90210, Babylon 5, the Star Trek series, Deep Space Nine, Voyager, Lizzie McGuire and more.

She also directed the ABC movie Before and After.

In 1988, Friedman was nominated for Primetime Emmy Award directing L.A. Law episode, "Handroll Express".

Along with her TV career, Kim directed theatre: including at Joe Papp's The Public Theater, New York Shakespeare Festival, and at the Tiffany Theater in Los Angeles. Friedman has also directed theater in London, as well as producing and directing the docu series The Real Normal and Here Comes the Dress.

== CrazyJewishMom ==
In late 2014, Friedman's daughter Kate began using Instagram to document the "crazy" text messages that she receives from her mother on a daily basis. The account has since garnered more than 800,000 followers, and has received attention from many media outlets, including ABC News, BuzzFeed, and Yahoo.

She is Jewish, and she and her daughter Kate Friedman visited Israel on a Birthright Israel trip.
