= List of Hill Street Blues episodes =

Hill Street Blues is an American serial police drama that aired on NBC in primetime from 1981 to 1987 for a total of 146 episodes. The show chronicled the lives of the staff of a single police station located on the fictional Hill Street, in an unnamed large city, with "blues" being a slang term for police officers for their blue uniforms. The show received critical acclaim, and its production innovations influenced many subsequent dramatic television series produced in the United States and Canada. Its debut season was rewarded with eight Emmy Awards, a debut season record surpassed only by The West Wing. The show received a total of 98 Emmy nominations during its run. The series ran for 146 episodes over seven seasons.

== Series overview ==
Season	Episodes	Originally released		Rank	Rating
Season	Episodes	First released	Last released	Rank	Rating
1	17	January 15, 1981	May 26, 1981	87	13.3
2	18	October 15, 1981	May 13, 1982	28	18.6
3	22	September 30, 1982	May 12, 1983	23	18.4
4	22	October 13, 1983	May 17, 1984	32	16.9
5	23	September 27, 1984	May 16, 1985	27	16.6
6	22	September 26, 1985	April 3, 1986	33	16.1
7	22	October 2, 1986	May 12, 1987	42	14.6

== Episodes ==
=== Season 1 (1981) ===
No. overall	No. in season	Title	Directed by	Written by	Original release date	Prod. code
1	1	"Hill Street Station"	Robert Butler	Michael Kozoll & Steven Bochco	January 15, 1981	TBA
Roll Call: 6:53 AM. A hostage situation arises in Captain Furillo's precinct. Public defender Joyce Davenport is looking for her client, lost due to bureaucratic mismanagement. Officers Hill and Renko are shot in the line of duty. The audience is introduced to Belker's growling, and his mother. This episode was awarded an Edgar for Best Teleplay from a Series. In 1996, TV Guide included this episode as part of its "100 Most Memorable Moments in TV History", ranking it # 63.
2	2	"Presidential Fever"	Robert Butler	Michael Kozoll & Steven Bochco	January 17, 1981	0401
Roll Call 7:12 AM. Furillo is not pleased by the proposed visit of the US President to Hill Street. Meanwhile his emerging relationship with Joyce Davenport is floundering. Hill and Renko (who was in a coma for two weeks) return to work. Grace Gardner arrives to redecorate, and has her eyes at once on Sergeant Esterhaus. Belker solves a series of rapes and captures two rapists - but the main suspect remains at large. Two officers are jumped when they leave a building after finding no evidence of a suspected theft.
3	3	"Politics as Usual"	Robert Butler	Michael Kozoll & Steven Bochco	January 22, 1981	0402
Roll Call: 7:07 AM. Negotiations continue with the gangs over the Presidential visit. Hill and Renko split as partners. Corrupt detective Sergeant Ralph Macafee is introduced, and LaRue is challenged by a massive bribe. When LaRue attempts to return the bribe money back to Macafee, he is immediately busted by IAD agents. Faye is also busted for being at the wrong place at the wrong time, but Furillo gets her out of jail on the condition they talk about an alimony arrangement they can both live with.
4	4	"Can World War III Be an Attitude?"	Robert Butler	Michael Kozoll & Steven Bochco	January 24, 1981	0403
Roll Call: 7:08 AM. The Presidential visit is canceled, leading to gang warfare, and a tense moment as the station house appears to be besieged. LaRue, under suspension, is investigated for corruption and referred to the DA for prosecution. Grace Gardner begins her efforts to win over Sergeant Esterhaus. "Malibu" (a talented car thief and mechanic) is arrested by Hill and Renko, but released after mending most of the patrol cars and the station plumbing and electrics.
5	5	"Double Jeopardy"	Robert Butler	Michael Kozoll & Steven Bochco	January 31, 1981	0404
Roll Call: 7:05 AM. Many of the male officers appear in drag in an attempt to trap the serial rapist; they succeed, but Bates is hospitalized. Sergeant Esterhaus struggles with his two women, Cindy and Grace. Sergeant Macaffee's secret is finally uncovered - he has two wives and two families. His resulting corruption is uncovered and saves LaRue from prosecution.
6	6	"Film at Eleven"	Georg Stanford Brown	Anthony Yerkovich	February 7, 1981	0406
Roll Call: 7:08 AM. A film crew shadows the precinct and takes a patrol with Hill and Renko. LaRue and Washington discover the gun used in the Hill/Renko shooting. Hunter appears for the first time as a Lieutenant (although he remains in the uniform of a Sergeant in the opening credits until the start of the fourth series; no direct reference is made to his promotion). Kevin "Dracula" (Tony Plana) is brought in by Belker on an assault charge, is detained in a jail cell and due to his mental instability hangs himself before the day is out. Both Joyce and Frank wonder if they did everything they could have to prevent it.
7	7	"Choice Cut"	Arnold Laven	Lee David Zlotoff	February 14, 1981	0407
Roll Call: 6:55 AM. Hector, a 15-year-old repeat offender for whom Furillo has a soft spot, takes hostages after an armed robbery; Furillo talks the situation to an end, preventing Hunter from deploying a massive arsenal of high-powered weaponry. Renko and Hill steal a large piece of meat, only to have it stolen from them by LaRue and Washington ... only for them to lose it in a bizarre switch. The TV crew continues to cause trouble. There are questions about whether Renko has correctly identified his shooter. Men are still being kidnapped, stripped naked and robbed by three prostitutes in a black van.
8	8	"Up in Arms"	Georg Stanford Brown	Michael Kozoll & Steven Bochco & Anthony Yerkovich	February 21, 1981	0405
Roll Call: 6:58 AM. Esterhaus goes out to meet a dangerous criminal once convicted on his evidence, now released from prison, only to find that his nemesis has taken to religion and is seeking forgiveness from Esterhaus. Santini and Harris (Mark Metcalf) encounter the black van and attempt to apprehend the three prostitutes without calling for assistance; as a result, Harris is murdered. The alleged shooter of Renko and Hill is released without charge.
9	9	"Your Kind, My Kind, Humankind"	Arnold Laven	Teleplay by : Michael Kozoll & Steven Bochco & Anthony Yerkovich; Story by : Bill Taub	February 28, 1981	0408
Roll Call: 6:55 AM. After the TV crew is involved (unauthorized, thanks to LaRue) in a liquor store stakeout that turns deadly, the TV presentation is favorable to Hill Street. The alleged shooter of Hill and Renko makes a confession, but Hill remains unconvinced and distanced from Renko. Belker's love life suffers a setback. Following the death of Harris, Officer Santini resigns to pursue his passion for cabinet making.
10	10	"Gatorbait"	Georg Stanford Brown	E. Jack Kaplan	March 7, 1981	0409
Roll Call 6:48 AM. Commander Swanson has been promoted to Deputy Chief of Police. Furillo and Ed Chappell are the two Captains competing to be the new Commander. Hunter and the Emergency Action Team (EAT) are in the sewers on the annual alligator hunt where they discover to their dismay that LaRue and Washington have already deployed a decoy Gator. Fay Furillo is receiving obscene and abusive telephone calls. Dolph Sweet makes the first of three appearances as Lieutenant Emil Schneider.
11	11	"Life, Death, Eternity" "Life, Death, Eternity, Etcetera"	Jack Starrett	Gregory Hoblit & Lee David Zlotoff	March 14, 1981	0410
Roll Call: 6:55 AM. Marvin (Marv) Box, the station handyman, aged 32, dies suddenly, leaving no relatives and causing much reflection by the other characters. Fay's stalker becomes bolder, entering her home. Furillo takes on a possibly corrupt City Councilman, despite the potential to damage his promotion to Commander. Esterhaus informs Furillo that in the light of his possible promotion out of the Precinct, certain other officers have requested to leave: one retirement, plus transfer requests from 17 detectives and 28 uniformed officers. Lieutenant Hunter produces a model of the PANDA (urban tank) with relish, while Furillo is upset by its proposed use in "Sniper Alley"; however, Chief Daniels has already authorized the deployment. A new patrol officer who has a past history with Belker harasses him due to his Jewish heritage, eventually resulting in a fight between the two. Dwight Schultz appears as Carmichael.
12	12	"I Never Promised You a Rose, Marvin"	Robert C. Thompson	Anthony Yerkovich	March 21, 1981	0411
Roll Call 6:56 AM. The investigation of Councilman McAuley is successful, and he is charged; but given his influential friends, Furillo loses any chance of promotion to Commander. Esterhaus reveals (to Goldblume) that Cindy is only just 18. His other girlfriend (Grace) is considerably more mature, but he needs both. Hunter receives his PANDA (urban tank), but while lunching with a squad of EAT officers and two Japanese businessmen (from the PANDA's manufacturers) it is stolen, stripped, gutted, and dumped in the East River. Fay's telephone stalker is caught - a patient of Harvey. Transfer requests had topped 75, and everyone at the Hill is relieved that their Captain will not be promoted away from them.
13	13	"Fecund Hand Rose"	Gregory Hoblit	Alan Rachins	March 25, 1981	0412
Roll Call: 7:02 AM. Lives are threatened as a mystery sniper takes a shot at Macafee and the officers protecting him; Goldblume, under fire for the first time, is particularly unnerved. Esterhaus is shocked when Grace bares all in the roll-call room. Later she turns up at his wedding to Cindy, prompting him to faint, and leaving the wedding postponed. Michael Tucker guest stars as a Jewel Thief - coincidentally in an episode written by future L.A. Law co-star Alan Rachins.
14	1	"Rites of Spring Part 1 & 2"	Gregory Hoblit	Michael Kozoll & Steven Bochco	May 19, 1981	0413-A/0413-B
15	2	"Rites of Spring Part 1 & 2"	Gregory Hoblit	Michael Kozoll & Steven Bochco & Anthony Yerkovich	May 19, 1981	0413-A/0413-B
(1) Roll Call 6:58 AM. Officers Mike Perez and Joe Coffey both have their first major roles in this episode; both were to be regulars for the next four years. There is a major clash between their respective partners (Cooper and Bates). Goldblume, reflecting on his son's illness and his clashes with narcotics colleagues, decides to resign, but Furillo persuades him to reflect further. Esterhaus is back with Grace, and his marriage to Cindy is cancelled. LaRue has an increasing problem with alcohol dependency, which leads to a near disaster for Belker, under cover, when he requests backup from LaRue. Weeks (Charles Hallahan), a racist narcotics officer, shoots a black suspect (legitimately) in the final scene. (2) Roll Call: 7:03 AM. While everyone pursues Weeks, he finds an unlikely ally in Washington, who believes his story. LaRue's drinking problem intensifies, and Furillo puts him on notice. Fay is mugged in the street.
16	1	"Jungle Madness Part 1 & 2"	Corey Allen	Michael Kozoll & Steven Bochco & Anthony Yerkovich	May 26, 1981	0414-A/0414-B
17	2	"Jungle Madness Part 1 & 2"	Corey Allen	Michael Kozoll & Steven Bochco & Anthony Yerkovich	May 26, 1981	0414-A/0414-B
(1) Roll Call: 6:48 AM. Everyone is still out to get Weeks, and even Furillo begins to question him; only Washington defends him. Davenport still wants to keep her relationship with Furillo secret. Esterhaus has a birthday, but doesn't like his belly dancing surprise gift, which interrupts roll call. LaRue's drinking nearly kills him and Washington, and Furillo gives him an ultimatum. (2) Roll Call: 7:12 AM. At the eleventh hour Washington finds the evidence to save Weeks, proving him innocent. Chief Daniels, who had already written off Weeks, is greatly displeased, and tempers flare between him and Captain Furillo. LaRue reaches rock bottom and finally walks into his first meeting of Alcoholics Anonymous - only to find Furillo also in attendance (a theme that was to recur strongly throughout all seven seasons). Coffey is shot during a vehicle stop. In the original version (now hard to obtain) he dies instantly. In the remade version (now broadcast as the repeat, and also the version available on video release) he is gravely injured, but recovers to return to the second season.

=== Season 2 (1981–82) ===
No. overall	No. in season	Title	Directed by	Written by	Original release date	Prod. code
18	1	"Hearts and Minds"	Gregory Hoblit	Teleplay by : Steven Bochco & Anthony Yerkovich; Story by : Michael Kozoll & Steven Bochco & Anthony Yerkovich	October 29, 1981	8005-1401
In the opening sequence, Davenport is nearly shot when an arrested perp breaks free, grabs a gun and opens fire inside the precinct. Coffey is on his tenth day back at work after the shooting. A missing seven-year-old boy has a huge team searching throughout the episode, including Bates, Coffey, Renko, Hill, and Perez, but it is Goldblume who finally locates the child. A thieving orangutan and its owner are arrested. Esterhaus is worn out by Grace Gardner and trying to distance himself from her, without success. Detective Ben Lambert (Charles Guardino) is accused of sexual assault during an arrest. Furillo celebrates his 40th birthday, and both Fay and Davenport ask to spend the night with him. He chooses Davenport (who, unusually, addresses Furillo as "Pizza Man" twice in this episode), but having demanded more in their relationship, he ends the episode alone. Danny Glover appears as Jesse John Hudson.
19	2	"Blood Money"	Gregory Hoblit	Teleplay by : Steven Bochco & Anthony Yerkovich; Story by : Michael Kozoll & Steven Bochco & Anthony Yerkovich	November 5, 1981	8005-1402
The orangutan is still in the station, and Belker leads a successful raid to recover stolen military weaponry, in an otherwise relationship-dominated episode. Goldblume (who is married), undercover as a cab driver, meets a new lady friend; Furillo and Davenport meet socially at an art exhibition, with other partners; Esterhaus formally breaks up with Grace; Hunter asks Grace on a date, and ends up heading towards the desired night of passion; Goldblume throws caution to the wind, and ends the episode back with his new friend in her apartment. Danny Glover guest stars as Jesse John Hudson in the first of four appearances.
20	3	"The Last White Man on East Ferry Avenue"	David Anspaugh	Teleplay by : Steven Bochco & Anthony Yerkovich & Robert Crais; Story by : Michael Kozoll & Steven Bochco & Anthony Yerkovich	November 12, 1981	8005-1403
The eponymous hero of the episode is a widower defending his property from immigrant neighbors who have already killed his dog; unfortunately, carried away, he produces a shotgun and kills a teenage boy, leading to a siege, ended by Goldblume's brave intervention. In the other main storyline, Detective Brooks is murdered by the Black Arrow, leading to the arrest of Jesse John Hudson, their leader, posing as a respectable politician. Goldblume's affair is discovered by his wife, who throws him out and ends their marriage. Hunter is forced to admit failure in his proposed night of passion with Grace Gardner, due to what Furillo calls "an equipment failure". Esterhaus spends the night with Margaret, his estranged wife "just sleeping".
21	4	"The Second Oldest Profession"	Robert Butler	Teleplay by : Steven Bochco & Anthony Yerkovich & Robert Crais; Story by : Michael Kozoll & Steven Bochco & Anthony Yerkovich	November 19, 1981	8005-1404
The title comes from "Operation Jezebel", uniformed officers and EAT rounding up prostitutes on the Hill, during which Bates makes a terrible mistake in judgment due to compassion. Hudson arrives at court to face Furillo but is assassinated by his former lawyer, still bearing the scars of the beating he gave her. Macallister comes out as gay to Esterhaus and makes a pass at him, ruining Esterhaus' first lunch break outside the station since he came to the Precinct "three years ago." Esterhaus and Gardner, Furillo and Davenport, and the two Goldblumes all get back together. CCH Pounder appears as Jasmine making the first of three appearances as different characters.
22	5	"Fruits of the Poisonous Tree"	Rod Holcomb	Jeffrey Lewis	December 3, 1981	8005-1409
The spirit of Monday Night Football is everywhere, even in the courthouse. When LaRue and Washington arrest Maxwell Jenkins (Essex Smith), a suspected serial mugger preying on elderly people, a cat and mouse game begins between police and Joyce Davenport, resulting in Jenkins being released due to a legal concept known as "Fruit of the poisonous tree". Grace briefly thinks she is pregnant, much to the delight of Esterhaus - and his dismay when it proves untrue. Bates shoots and kills a 14-year-old boy who had first fired on her and is himself the murderer of a ten-year-old girl, leading many officers to reflective contemplation.
23	6	"Cranky Streets"	Randa Haines	Teleplay by : Robert Crais; Story by : Michael Kozoll & Steven Bochco	December 10, 1981	8005-1405
Officers Gerry Nash and Estella Sanchez, transferring from other precincts, are assigned to Hill and Renko for local training. Hill and Nash formerly served together at Jefferson Heights Precinct, and Nash starts well, rescuing two people from a burning car. Later at a violent incident, Nash uses excessive force and seriously wounds a suspect, for which Hill later covers, also persuading Renko, Bates, and Coffey to do likewise. Coffey encounters childhood friends, while patrolling his old neighborhood, and arrests one of them. A strike looms as the City Council fails to meet police pay and conditions demands.
24	7	"Chipped Beef"	Georg Stanford Brown	Story by : Michael Kozoll & Steven Bochco; Teleplay by : Jeffrey Lewis	December 17, 1981	8005-1406
William Teacher, a friendly and helpful black father and husband, saves Renko from a serious assault and Washington and LaRue from a mob - yet is arrested due to an outstanding warrant, five years old, from a different state. The officers are indignant and demand his release - something Furillo initially refuses, but finally arranges. In the initial scene with Teacher (15 minutes into the episode) Hill uses an early example (1981 broadcast date) of the techno-intransigent catchphrase "Computer says no". Furillo talks to the officers covering for Nash and persuades them to change their statements and tell the truth; this leads Nash to resign. Belker has an undercover encounter with the new phenomenon of ATM cash machines - and catches the culprits involved. On the personal front Washington and his girlfriend Jill (Lynn Whitfield) have a hiccup and a reconciliation. Fay's new fiancé collapses and dies at a public lunch, in front of Furillo and Hunter. She is comforted by Davenport - their first formal meeting.
25	8	"The World According to Freedom"	Jeff Bleckner	Michael Wagner	January 7, 1982	8005-1407
An unidentified street gang tortures and murders several innocent people in an extended robbery and Furillo responds angrily against all the gangs. Belker's gas station undercover operation is ruined by the well-intentioned "Captain Freedom", who fancies himself as a superhero and dresses in a red lycra suit, green shorts and elbow pads with a red leather cap and goggles. The downstairs holding cells are refurbished, and at once a prisoner tries to hang himself in them.
26	9	"Pestolozzi's Revenge"	Randa Haines	Teleplay by : Anthony Yerkovich & Jeffrey Lewis & Michael Wagner; Story by : Michael Kozoll & Steven Bochco	January 14, 1982	8005-1410
Chief Daniels is concerned about corruption in the South Ferry Precinct and asks Furillo to set up a fake saloon there; Furillo is dismayed that when he appears before the politically motivated corruption commission, plans (and the details of his private conversation with Daniels) appear to be known. As just part of a very bad day, Renko crashes two patrol cars and has to confess to having his police revolver stolen while he was engaged in illegal gambling. Coffey is discovered to have had sex with a married woman while standing up Bates - she is unforgiving. "Captain Freedom" continues his anti-crime campaign.
27	10	"The Spy Who Came in From Delgado"	Georg Stanford Brown	Teleplay by : Steven Bochco & Anthony Yerkovich & Jeffrey Lewis & Michael Wagner; Story by : Michael Kozoll & Steven Bochco	January 21, 1982	8005-1411
Corruption-spotting is still the central feature of Department life as the Sullivan Commission continues. A filing clerk transferred from Division seems friendly but inefficient, leading Calletano to uncover her as a detective sent by Daniels to spy on the Precinct. She is sent away, but has already discovered the truth of Officer Arthur Delgado, who suffered burnout after nineteen and one-half exemplary years on the force but has been kept on the books as a "paper soldier" by Furillo to get 20 years service credit for his pension. "Captain Freedom" continues shadowing Belker to "help and protect" him.
28	11	"Freedom's Last Stand"	Gregory Hoblit	Teleplay by : Steven Bochco & Anthony Yerkovich & Jeffrey Lewis & Michael Wagner; Story by : Michael Kozoll & Steven Bochco	January 28, 1982	8005-1412
Goldblume goes undercover to solve a purse snatching and gets badly beaten, yet successfully apprehends the purse snatcher. Furillo testifies again before the Sullivan Commission and offers his resignation to Chief Daniels, who has clearly set him up. Daniels refuses the resignation and agrees to restore Delgado to 30 years service for pension purposes. Still successfully entrapping corrupt officers in South Ferry, the fake saloon is raided by armed robbers - but in the ensuing shoot-out, "Captain Freedom" is fatally wounded and dies in Belker's arms. After 30 hours of successful gambling, Bates loses out in the final game of the Tenth Annual Inter-Precinct Poker tournament. In 2009, TV Guide ranked this episode number 57 on its list of the 100 Greatest Episodes.
29	12	"Of Mouse and Man"	Thomas Carter	Teleplay by : Steven Bochco & Anthony Yerkovich & Jeffrey Lewis & Michael Wagner; Story by : Michael Kozoll & Steven Bochco	February 11, 1982	8005-1413
The title comes from Belker's pet mouse Micky, who is accidentally killed by Coffey during the episode. Public Defender Pam Gilliam is murdered (much to the distress of Davenport), but following a joint sweep of the Royal Blood gang by EAT and uniforms, the murder weapon is recovered by Hunter, Schmeltzer, and Ballantine. In his absence, Hill is elected Vice President of the Black Officers' Coalition (BOC) (proposed by Lieutenant Cleveland), leading to a strained relationship with Renko. Goldblume pursues a complaint against a vicious and uncaring landlord in a decaying apartment block. Jonathan Frakes appears as a drug dealer.
30	13	"Zen and the Art of Law Enforcement"	Arnold Laven	Teleplay by : Anthony Yerkovich & Jeffrey Lewis & Michael Wagner; Story by : Thom Thomas & Michael Kozoll & Steven Bochco	February 18, 1982	8005-1408
The Gilliam murder suspects are released on a legal technicality. LaRue drinks and almost ruins a major drugs bust. Goldblume loses his patience with the corrupt landlord and for the first time uses force to make his point. Renko has a temporary partner (just transferred from Washington Heights Precinct) who lets him down badly, while Hill is busy with BOC work. Esterhaus discovers more about Grace's prolific sex life.
31	14	"The Young, the Beautiful and the Degraded"	Lawrence Levy	Teleplay by : Anthony Yerkovich & Jeffrey Lewis & Michael Wagner; Story by : Michael Kozoll & Steven Bochco	February 25, 1982	8005-1414
Gilliam's murderer is finally caught - but only after he has been released and killed his own accomplice for alleged disloyalty. Furillo sends LaRue to work in the motor pool and warns that he intends to recommend dismissal. Hill resigns as Vice President of the BOC. John Witherspoon appears as "businessman".
32	15	"Some Like it Hot-Wired"	Thomas Carter	Teleplay by : Steven Bochco & Anthony Yerkovich & Jeffrey Lewis & Michael Wagner; Story by : Michael Kozoll & Steven Bochco	March 18, 1982	8005-1415
A successful bust of car thieves gives the episode its title. In the opening scenes, Furillo receives retirement threats from three of his senior staff: Sergeant Esterhaus (whose car has been stolen overnight), Sergeant Goldblume (who has missed out on promotion, apparently because a black promotion candidate was needed), and Lieutenant Calletano (whose pay deductions have left him with a monthly income of just nine dollars). Sergeant Chesley receives his promotion to Lieutenant, precipitating Goldblume's depression. Goldblume compensates by going out on an undercover operation where he is shot, the bullet just missing his heart. Davenport narrowly avoids contempt of court when she suddenly refuses to defend her client - a reaction to the Gilliam murder. Renko visits his father in hospital and learns that Renko Sr. is riddled with cancer, and has a short time to live. Meg Tilly makes the first of two appearances as different characters.
33	16	"Personal Foul"	David Anspaugh	Steven Bochco & Anthony Yerkovich & Jeffrey Lewis & Michael Wagner	March 25, 1982	8005-1416
Belker and Washington are undercover at an adult movie theater. A redundant housing authority cop takes his partner and child hostage. Goldblume returns to work and announces his divorce. The precinct plays basketball against a mixed team of gang members. A final second victory is denied when someone in the crowd shoots the ball (with a gun).
34	17	"The Shooter"	Thomas Carter	Steven Bochco & Anthony Yerkovich & Jeffrey Lewis & Michael Wagner	May 6, 1982	8005-1417
Halloran and Tubbs are shot (the former fatally) with a weapon which had been in police custody. Officer Wallins (Ben Slack) of the Property Department admits to selling the piece to his brother-in-law, thus beginning a mammoth process of tracing the weapon. LaRue, who becomes involved in the case via the motor pool, proves a key to the trace. Belker's drivers license renewal includes an unexpected high-speed chase after a robbery suspect during his road test. John Renko (Officer Renko's father) returns to hospital after his spine collapses and prepares to die. Hill Street hosts a weapons convention, at which Hunter urges the chief officer of the EAT (Commander Remmington) to increase his weapons budget - Furillo is indignant at the suggestion. Tracey Walter makes the first of two appearances as different characters.
35	18	"Invasion of the Third World Body Snatchers"	Gregory Hoblit	Steven Bochco & Anthony Yerkovich & Jeffrey Lewis & Michael Wagner	May 13, 1982	8005-1418
John Renko dies, but the van containing his body is stolen from outside the funeral home. Later, the abandoned corpse is discovered by Bates, Coffey, and Belker dumped among a group of winos. After a serious talk between Furillo and Washington, LaRue is reinstated as a detective. Commander Lakeland continues to pester Bates, who has called off their relationship after discovering that Lakeland is married. Furillo and Davenport finally depart on holiday after Joyce successfully clears a man falsely accused of rape. Henry Goldblume and Fay Furillo run into each other unexpectedly at a singles bar.

=== Season 3 (1982–83) ===
No. overall	No. in season	Title	Directed by	Written by	Original release date	Prod. code
36	1	"Trial by Fury"	Gregory Hoblit	David Milch	September 30, 1982	2403
Sergeant Esterhaus appears only at roll call; it is explained that he will be spending each daytime training cadets (in fact actor Michael Conrad was increasingly ill and unable to act). Officer Jock Buchanan appears for the first time promoted to Corporal. The murder of shopkeeper Rodriguez is overshadowed (and unsolved) by the rape and murder of a nun by two black men. They are caught and finally confess, chiefly to avoid being released uncharged into the angry mob awaiting them. Calletano faces up to an IRS tax audit. Belker arrests Eddie Gregg - his first encounter with the young male prostitute, destined to have a profound effect upon the detective.
37	2	"Domestic Beef"	Jeff Bleckner	Anthony Yerkovich & Jeffrey Lewis & Michael Wagner	October 7, 1982	2407
Bates and Coffey find a steer in a fifth floor apartment, but Hill and Renko preside over the disaster of trying to return it to ground level in a sling under the police helicopter. Captain Hogan (Jefferson Heights) is found guilty of misconduct at Furillo's insistence by a Board of Rights because he could not control corruption in his precinct. Hogan later crashes the 25th anniversary dinner of Chief Daniels, makes an impromptu speech, then goes home and kills himself. John Gennaro, an action film star, visits the Hill in order to prepare for his next film role. Goldblume, undercover as an ice-cream salesman, arrests a 15-year-old robber. Belker, on the same operation, forgets his mother's birthday. LaRue is turned down for a security job in the Bahamas, and is furious that the job is offered to Washington instead.
38	3	"Heat Rash"	David Anspaugh	Anthony Yerkovich & Jeffrey Lewis & Michael Wagner	October 14, 1982	2409
The heatwave continues. A gang meeting to discuss participation in the Hollywood movie proves a success. Fay begins work as a crime reporter, thanks to a press pass issued by Chief Daniels. John Gennaro insists on tagging along with Belker, much to Belker's annoyance. Bates and Coffey have to deal with "a man from outer space" who needs a phone to call home. Councilman Detweiler is arrested for drunk driving, but is released on the orders of Chief Daniels. LaRue continues to sulk over the Bahamas job being offered to Washington. Hunter heads into hospital with a tumor, fearing he has cancer. The Chief orders Furillo to get rid of Goldblume because of an alleged incident with an underage prostitute - Furillo, naturally, resists. Armin Shimerman appears as the "Phone Man".
39	4	"Rain of Terror"	Thomas Carter	Anthony Yerkovich & Jeffrey Lewis and Michael Wagner	October 21, 1982	2410
Officers Coley and Lyle, prominent figures of early series three episodes who had looked like new regulars, are discovered (by LaRue and Washington) to be corrupt - both are arrested and suspended. Furillo defies Chief Daniels in supporting Goldblume and incurs the Chief's wrath. Hunter's tumor is discovered to be benign, although he has already discussed his funeral plans with Furillo. Renko meets a lovely woman on his birthday and spends an hour of passion with her - only to discover that she is a prostitute hired by his friends. Initially reacting badly, later he asks her to accompany him to a baseball game and she accepts. After being told to stay away, John Gennaro is killed when he intervenes in Belker's meet with a drug dealer. Washington turns down the job offer in the Bahamas to stay with partner LaRue. The heat wave finally breaks.
40	5	"Officer of the Year"	David Anspaugh	Karen Hall	October 28, 1982	2402
Ray Calletano is Hispanic Officer of the Year, but unexpectedly uses his presentation dinner to attack the Police Department for institutional racism. Belker is undercover in a massage parlor, while Washington (as back up outside) accidentally shoots dead the shop keeper rather than the robber in the confused aftermath of a robbery in the massage parlor's neighboring store. Bates has her first court appearance and is made to look foolish by Davenport. Renko chases a mugger and subsequently dates the female victim. Frank Junior is missing throughout the episode, but is found in a tearful final scene. Helen Shaver makes the first of four appearances as Teresa Hyler
41	6	"Stan the Man"	Thomas Carter	David Milch	November 4, 1982	2405
Centered on a condemned building, in one storyline Goldblume contends with an elderly resident determined to jump from the roof, while in another storyline Hill deals with a family who will not leave without grandma (immobile, elderly, and almost blind). The grandmother predicts that God will deal with the situation, and (holding her Bible) a little later passes away. Detective Mizell (undercover narcotics) clashes with Washington and LaRue during a meeting with "Sid the Snitch" (first appearance; will recur and then become a semi-regular character in the final season), and later also with Furillo. Out of control, he later smashes up LaRue's car and finally is found dead - causing suspicion to fall on LaRue. Hunter continues to get closer to Nurse Wulfawitz. Also, the condition of Belker's father deteriorates. Having become determined to fund a home nurse, he seeks a loan at his bank, which is firstly refused, but then granted after Belker thwarts an armed robbery. Meanwhile Davenport, having been attacked by a crazed arrestee, spends the episode in the hospital. Lee Weaver makes his second appearance in Hill Street Blues and first as memorable recurring character "Buck Naked". He would go on to reprise "Buck Naked" a decade later in another Steven Bochco show NYPD Blue.
42	7	"Little Boil Blue"	David Anspaugh	Robert Earl	November 11, 1982	2411
The boil of the title is on Hill's posterior. A suspect is found in the Mizell murder; Daniels asks Furillo to investigate and keep Fuchs informed - then behind Captain Fuchs' back indicates that he wants Fuchs hung out to dry. Belker is undercover investigating insurance fraud, which requires him to get knocked down by Goldblume in a car. Bates and Coffey try to deal with a disturbed Vietnam veteran, but the encounter ends in disaster. Fay's first newspaper article is twisted by the editors, prompting her to accept the (previously unwelcome) advances of attorney Wachtel in order to secure some free legal advice. Joseph Chapman appeared as Freed. CCH Pounder appears as Wilna Tucker, making the second of three guest appearances as different characters.
43	8	"Requiem For a Hairbag"	Robert Kelljan	Mark Frost	November 18, 1982	2412
Chief Daniels praises Mizell at his funeral, for the sake of his family, while preparing to act on the evidence of Mizell's widespread corruption. Councilman Detweiler threatens to expose Mizell's corruption - and corruption in the police force in general - but before he can act, he kills an old lady while driving drunk. Hill is naked on the doctor's table when his fellow officers burst in to arrest the doctor for fraud - much to their amusement. LaRue abandons his attorney, Wachtel, moments before Wachtel too is arrested on the same charge. Hunter proposes to his nurse girlfriend, but she (a Jewish woman) turns him down on grounds of religion. Fay Furillo's home is burgled. Bates and Coffey deal with a baby abandoned in the back of their patrol car. A title card before this episode states: "This episode of Hill Street Blues is dedicated to the memory of Dominique Dunne". She portrayed Cindy, the abused teenage mother of the abandoned baby. Dunne had died just 14 days before airdate, after having been attacked by an ex five days before her death.
44	9	"A Hair of the Dog"	Gregory Hoblit	Steven Bochco & Anthony Yerkovich & Jeffrey Lewis	November 25, 1982	2413
Six newly qualified officers start their first shift, including Robin Tataglia (who was destined to remain to the very end of the series). The Governor pays a visit, during which his wife's Lhasa Apso (a gift from the people of Tibet) is stolen and held for ransom; on Chief Daniels' orders disproportionate police resources are assigned to the search. Fay's big mouth lands her in jail on a Contempt of Court charge. A missing autopsy report highlights drastic failings on the part of the coroner and his staff; Furillo (an old friend) tries to help. Eddie Gregg becomes an informant for Belker.
45	10	"Phantom of the Hill"	David Anspaugh	Teleplay by : Michael Wagner & David Milch; Story by : Steven Bochco and Anthony Yerkovich & Jeffrey Lewis	December 2, 1982	2414
The Phantom (a fictional sewer-dwelling beast, acted out by an experienced officer to frighten rookies) strikes; played by LaRue, he strikes terror into the four new officers in a storm drain until one of them panics and opens fire - happily missing his target. Eddie Gregg informs on his boyfriend, who has committed a multiple murder; Belker allows Gregg to sleep at his house. Belker also arrests a suspect during a robbery at a jeweler, where he is collecting a ring for Esterhaus. Esterhaus proposes to Grace Gardner, but is rejected. Renko's girlfriend has had enough of his reverse-snobbish attitude and breaks off their relationship. The coroner's incompetence intensifies as it transpires that a corpse essential as evidence has been cremated. Furillo, Joyce, Fay and Fay's judge have an awkward encounter at a hotel elevator while both leaving and arriving.
46	11	"No Body's Perfect"	Randa Haines	Teleplay by : Michael Wagner & David Milch; Story by : Steven Bochco & Anthony Yerkovich and Jeffrey Lewis	December 9, 1982	2415
Coroner Nydorf is humiliated in court, despite Furillo's warning that the authorities wish to get rid of him. Officer Crawford is partnered with Hill, his third partner is three days; despite having gotten a reputation for cowardice, Crawford bravely stands up to an armed murderer, winning the respect of his colleagues. Renko and Coffey fight over a woman, but make up. Sid the Snitch is arrested. Belker's relationship with Eddie Gregg becomes more complex. The Governor's wife's dog is found - but promptly lost again by Hunter. Ray Calletano attempts to set up Esterhaus with Esperanza, the cousin of his wife (Rosa), whose US visa is close to expiring. Big Bertha, the station furnace, misbehaves throughout the episode, causing extreme flows of heat in the building.
47	12	"Santaclaustrophobia"	Jeff Bleckner	Steven Bochco & Anthony Yerkovich & Jeffrey Lewis	December 16, 1982	2416
To catch a thief Belker is one of three detectives undercover as street Santas in this Christmas episode. Later Belker distributes toys at the Children's Hospital, assisted by several cast members dressed as elves or reindeer. Thus attired, they make a significant arrest (of armed muggers) on their way home in a police van. Hill's father visits, but is not welcome. He borrows money and leaves again. Washington suffers guilt following his shooting of an innocent shopkeeper three months earlier.
48	13	"Gung Ho"	David Anspaugh	David Milch & Jeffrey Lewis & Michael Wagner	January 20, 1983	2417
The Gung Ho Chinese takeaway supplies lunch to a busy Hill Street station, resulting in multiple upset stomachs. Two terrorists from the "Uhuru" movement are questioned in the station following the armed robbery of a security van, in which two guards were killed. Meanwhile the same group shoots dead Officer Dorsey while he is getting coffee across from a games arcade where he, Tataglia, and Belker are undercover. The group's headquarters is later discovered, and all those inside are killed in a shoot-out with the Hill Street officers.
49	14	"Moon Over Uranus"	Christian I. Nyby II	Teleplay by : Anthony Yerkovich & Jeffrey Lewis & Michael Wagner & David Milch; Story by : Joseph Gunn and Steven Bochco & Jeffrey Lewis	January 27, 1983	2404
Furillo, woken in the night by the county sheriff to vouch for Renko who had exposed himself at a stag party, assigns Renko to parking ticket duty, riding a Vespa moped. His first ticket is issued to Detective Salvatore Benedetto (Dennis Franz, who later portrayed Lt. Norman Buntz), and leads to a fist fight. Goldblume, now promoted to Lieutenant, tries to support a young woman threatened by her ex-boyfriend. Bates and Coffey arrest a survivalist who is then, in a case of mistaken identity, shot in the station by a detective from another precinct, whose daughter has been attacked. Fay tries to get herself sent to court in order to see her traffic judge boyfriend again after a row. Chief Daniels takes to the streets, but is bitten by a rat, leading to an intensive rat hunt.
50	15	"Moon Over Uranus: the Sequel"	Oz Scott	Teleplay by : Mark Frost; Story by : Mark Frost & Steven Bochco & Jeffrey Lewis	February 3, 1983	2418
Renko rescues several people from a burning building, and is recommended for a medal - and returned to motor patrol. Hill fights Benedetto, to avenge Renko. Goldblume's female victim is murdered by her stalker, as she predicted, and as Goldblume had feared. Chief Daniels orders a massive swoop on drug dealers, but the operation is aborted by Furillo. Hunter is upset, but Daniels is furious, ordering a series of repeat operations. Furillo goes on a date while Joyce Davenport is out of town.
51	16	"Moon Over Uranus: the Final Legacy"	David Anspaugh	Teleplay by : Anthony Yerkovich & Jeffrey Lewis & Michael Wagner and David Milch; Story by : Philip Combest and Steven Bochco & Jeffrey Lewis	February 10, 1983	2401
Furillo questions Davenport about why she never checked into her hotel while away on interview; their relationship becomes strained. Goldblume, distraught over his failure to protect the young woman in the previous episode, is frantic to protect a family whose son refuses to join the local gang. Lieutenant Calletano sports a toupee (to the amusement of colleagues) before confessing a fear that he will never be promoted to Captain (in the light of Goldblume, who is a confidante of Furillo, being recently promoted to Lieutenant). Sergeant Esterhaus confides that he once took, and passed, the Lieutenant's Examination, but was still passed over for promotion to that rank. Fay finds out why Judge Grogan is avoiding her.
52	17	"The Belles of St. Mary's"	David Rosenbloom	Teleplay by : Anthony Yerkovich & Jeffrey Lewis & Michael Wagner & David Milch; Story by : Steven Bochco & Anthony Yerkovich & Jeffrey Lewis	February 17, 1983	2419
LaRue makes a fool of himself when a group of schoolgirls visit the station - revealing his fantasies about schoolgirls, which recur in later episodes (see ep 140, for example). Vic Hitler, a penniless comedian with multiple outstanding traffic tickets, is arrested, and causes much amusement. The death-in-custody of a young black man leaves Coffey under suspicion. Lieutenant Calletano and newly promoted Lieutenant Goldblume argue over seniority - technically Goldblume is senior as he is a "Detective Lieutenant", while Calletano believes he has seniority, having been a Lieutenant for several years. Furillo takes them out to lunch to solve the problem, but relationships remain tense. Belker and Tataglia develop their relationship further. Fay learns that she's pregnant. Davenport is offered a job in Washington. Ally Sheedy makes the first of three appearances as the schoolgirl Kirsten, and Larry D. Mann makes the first of 15 appearances as Judge Lee Oberman.
53	18	"Life in the Minors"	Jeff Bleckner	Teleplay by : Michael Wagner & David Milch & Karen Hall; Story by : Steven Bochco & Anthony Yerkovich & Jeffrey Lewis	February 24, 1983	2420
LaRue continues to work with Vic Hitler, investing $500. The much sought-after biker is found and arrested - an alternative suspect in the death-in-custody, though IAD continue to question Coffey (much to the annoyance of Bates). Belker's father dies, and Furillo breaks the news while Belker is on an operation. Calletano, still working on his promotion prospects, draws up a list of refutations of possible criticisms of himself (none of which have actually been made). LaRue sets up a false undercover operation to lure one of the school girls into a van. She offers him sexual favors, but he has a lucid moment, makes his apologies and takes off.
54	19	"Eugene's Comedy Empire Strikes Back"	David Anspaugh	Teleplay by : Anthony Yerkovich & David Milch & Karen Hall; Story by : Steven Bochco & Anthony Yerkovich & Jeffrey Lewis	March 3, 1983	2421
Crockett, the biker, continues to cause trouble. Furillo and Davenport surprise themselves, and everyone else, by getting married during their lunch break. Fay Furillo is distressed at the news and admits she had hoped that she and Frank would get back together eventually. Tataglia transfers to a different precinct, maintaining her relationship with Belker but no longer working with him. Bates goes undercover as a bus driver and successfully arrests armed robbers. Vic Hitler begins a comedy routine on stage, arranged by LaRue, but then falls asleep - later admitting he has narcolepsy.
55	20	"Spotlight on Rico"	Rick Wallace	Teleplay by : Jeffrey Lewis & Michael Wagner & David Milch & Karen Hall; Story by : Steven Bochco & Jeffrey Lewis & Michael Wagner	April 28, 1983	2422
Benedetto reappears, this time on temporary transfer to Hill Street. While making his first arrest (Moe Feldstein) with Washington, he kills Crockett (the biker) who had drawn a gun and threatened the detectives. A man (Jonathan Banks) arrested at the scene of a murder in a night shelter turns out to be the murderer; it is discovered that he has dissociative identity disorder with about 30 personalities. Hunter proposes to Nurse Wulfawitz, who turns him down and ends their relationship. Rico finally comes down from his six-year high on drugs, thanks to Leo's dedicated support. Benedetto proves corrupt when the episode closes with him illegally executing Moe Feldstein in a secret nighttime meeting.
56	21	"Buddy, Can You Spare a Heart?"	Thomas Carter	Teleplay by : Michael Wagner & David Milch & Karen Hall; Story by : Steven Bochco & Anthony Yerkovich & Jeffrey Lewis	May 5, 1983	2423
LaRue's attempts to fool colleagues with a cow's heart fall flat - nobody mistakes it for a human heart. Hill and Renko recover a large sum of money and are tempted to keep it - but don't. Their cruiser is stolen by a young boy living rough, for whom Hill rapidly develops an affection. Hunter continues to develop a relationship with his Vietnamese masseuse. A bomb in the Men's Room at the precinct house is claimed as the work of the multiple-personality secure hospital escapee, who is later cornered by Goldblume but kills himself by jumping from a window. Washington and Benedetto, undercover, are jumped by two masked and armed men instead of meeting with the contact mark-the mêlée ends with a gunshot to Washington's left shoulder area. The scene concludes with Benedetto frantically driving Neil to the closest hospital while he is bleeding heavily with his life on the line.
57	22	"A Hill of Beans"	Rick Wallace	Teleplay by : Anthony Yerkovich & David Milch & Mark Frost; Story by : Steven Bochco & Jeffrey Lewis & David Milch	May 12, 1983	2424
The theme of unpaid police wages, raised over the previous two episodes, reaches a climax when the payroll is sent in cash, but the courier is robbed by the Diablos street gang en route. Their leader, Jesus Martinez, is jailed and the cash recovered at the close of the episode. The background rejoicing is poignantly overwritten by the cameras focusing on Rico, who has returned to drugs and is high, and Leo, deeply grieved that Rico's "rescue" has failed. "Iggie", a corrupt property clerk at the Midtown precinct, is arrested and surrenders the name of Benedetto as being behind the holdup which left Washington wounded. Benedetto is cornered in a bank and takes his own life. In two other storylines of the close of the season, Esterhaus is deeply moved when Fay asks him to be Godfather to her unborn daughter, and the TK4600 robot, after featuring in several episodes with its English inventor, is finally put to practical use while Benedetto is temporarily holding a hostage. The robot's inventor asks Bates and Coffey for a farewell encounter, with clear sexual overtones - the officers turn him down and withdraw.

=== Season 4 (1983–84) ===
No. overall	No. in season	Title	Directed by	Written by	Original release date
58	1	"Here's Adventure, Here's Romance"	Christian I. Nyby II	Story by : Steven Bochco & Jeffrey Lewis & David Milch; Teleplay by : Michael Wagner & David Milch & Karen Hall & Mark Frost	October 13, 1983
Detective Arthur "Art" Bradley (Lawrence Pressman), who is homosexual, but married with children, is the only surviving witness to a mass-murder in a gay bar; much of the episode revolves around attempts by Washington and LaRue to cover for him, and his eventual decision to come forward formally as a witness. Goldblume becomes Fay's partner in natural childbirth classes, a horse-riding eccentric, the "Cisco Kid" (Martin Ferrero) causes problems, and Calletano finally passes a kidney stone (with a loud scream) during very hot weather, and a series of city-wide power cuts. This episode introduced new photos for each cast member in the opening titles (except for Ed Marinaro); notably, Howard Hunter is finally shown with Lieutenant insignia, though he had been promoted in Episode 6 of the first season.
59	2	"Ba-bing, Ba-bing"	David Anspaugh	Karen Hall	October 20, 1983
The title is a comment by Renko as Coffey walks out on a date with twin mud-wrestlers, arrested earlier in the day at a fracas in a mud-wrestling bar. Hill wins $100,000 on the lottery and promptly sets about losing it through gambling. Gang trouble flares on the eve of mayoral candidate Ben Fisk moving into a rough part of the Hill, the Dante Projects. The other candidate, Chief Daniels, attempts to engage the support of Furillo. Furillo and Goldblume fall out over the issue of gang leadership as Jesus Martinez returns from prison, undermining Goldblume's plan to promote Hector Ruiz. Deputy Chief Mahoney, who has a dislike of Hill Street, suspends Belker unjustly.
60	3	"The Long Law of the Arm"	Alexander Singer	Michael Wagner	October 27, 1983
Deputy Chief Mahoney continues to make trouble for the Hill Street officers, leading Furillo to an uncharacteristic display of insubordination. LaRue and Washington recover a missing arm in time to have it sewn back on to the victim of a car crash. Davenport defends Kiki, a West Indian student who is robbed while working as a cab driver. Hector Ruiz takes another hostage - Ben Fisk - but this time loses his life when an EAT sniper kills him to save Fisk. Hill's winnings begin to have a negative effect on him. Renko loses a $2,500 gift from Hill, but Hill simply replaces the cash. Goldblume and Fay have their first kiss.
61	4	"Death by Kiki"	Bill Duke	David Milch & Mark Frost	November 3, 1983
Bates and Coffey both pass the Sergeant's Examination (Bates third, Coffey 23rd) and hope for forthcoming vacancies in that rank. Kiki finds the knife used to attack him, but in his anxiety over his immigration status he visits his attacker to plead with him, and in the ensuing fight, kills him. Hill becomes insufferable (and only Renko stands by him) until he loses all his money in gambling. Fay is delivered of a healthy baby girl. At the Dante Projects, Ben Fisk returns (with press coverage) and is accidentally killed as he falls from a rotten window. At a gang killing across the street from Diablo headquarters, Jesus Martinez predicts it will be the last. Chief Daniels intervenes for Furillo and makes Deputy Chief Mahoney drop all charges against Hill Street officers.
62	5	"Doris in Wonderland"	Arthur Allan Seidelman	Story by : Steven Bochco & Jeffrey Lewis & David Milch; Teleplay by : Peter Silverman	November 10, 1983
Wonderland is a sex shop and peep show in Midtown Precinct, where Furillo's officers undertake an anti-vice operation on the orders of Daniels, as the Chief seeks points in the mayoral election race against his new opponent, Commander Ozzie Cleveland. Mike Perez accidentally shoots a small boy, Jimmy Robson, who was armed with a toy gun (this incident was based on a real-life incident in Stanton, California). To deflect attention during the election campaign, pressure is brought to bear on Furillo to arrest the child's mother, Mrs. Doris Robson (Alfre Woodard), for abandonment (she was out seeking employment, having insufficient money to feed the child). Bates is injured in a brawl and is invited on a date by the doctor who re-inflates her collapsed lung.
63	6	"Praise Dilaudid"	Gabrielle Beaumont	Story by : Steven Bochco & Jeffrey Lewis & David Milch; Teleplay by : Michael Wagner	November 17, 1983
Hill and Renko capture the "Emily Post Bandit", though Renko is turned green by the explosion of dye packets in the money. The Bandit escapes custody and takes a woman hostage in her own home, demanding Dilaudid for her safe release. In court, the prosecution of Mrs. Robson for felony child endangerment is thrown out, with a severe reprimand from Judge Oberman to the city authorities for ever pursuing it. At the Wonderland operation, LaRue meets attorney Wachtel in a dress, exploring his sexual identity.
64	7	"Goodbye, Mr. Scripps"	Corey Allen	Story by : Steven Bochco & Jeffrey Lewis & David Milch; Teleplay by : Mark Frost	November 24, 1983
It is election day. Randolph Scripps, a late candidate, is creating more trouble than interest; Goldblume takes an interest. Daniels, expecting to win, offers to put Furillo forward as the next Chief. Deputy Chief Mahoney, overhearing, goes public with Daniels' and Furillo's roles in the failed Robson prosecution. Wachtel continues his comeback - still in women's clothes. Jimmy Robson's funeral takes place. Furillo spends time with Mike Perez Junior, the teenage son of Officer Mike Perez. Mike Junior has been bullied following Jimmy Robson's killing; Mike Senior remains in a psychiatric ward, traumatized by Jimmy Robson's death. This episode began with a tribute to Michael Conrad - this message, against a black screen: "Michael Conrad died November 22, 1983. Hill Street Blues is a living tribute to his memory. Rest in Peace"
65	8	"Midway to What?"	Thomas Carter	Story by : Jeffrey Lewis & David Milch; Teleplay by : Jeffrey Lewis & Michael Wagner & Karen Hall & Mark Frost	December 1, 1983
"Buck Naked" (Lee Weaver) has his feature role as a witness against corrupt taxi operators. The judge unexpectedly overturns the decision of the jury, and Davenport implies to Furillo that she suspects the judge of corruption. An investigation into police corruption turns up evidence that, fourteen years prior, rookie patrolman Howard Hunter was coerced into being the "bagman" for two corrupt Midtown detectives. Furillo informs Hunter, who sinks immediately into depression, believing that he has disgraced himself and the police force. Also in this episode, Fay and Henry have a sexual encounter, Hill is victorious in a police boxing match, and Michael Conrad makes a short and shaky appearance at roll call, looking very drawn and unwell. Michael Ironside appears as Schrader Rene Enriquez (Ray Calletano) does not appear in this episode.
66	9	"Honk if You're a Goose"	Arthur Allan Seidelman	Story by : Jeffrey Lewis & David Milch; Teleplay by : Michael Wagner & David Milch & Karen Hall & Mark Frost	December 8, 1983
Honk, the "guard goose on the loose", is caught by Bates and Coffey, but executed in the station by its owner; Calletano and Schnitz make arrangements to salvage the "dark meat". Hunter appears at the stationhouse with powder burns, having survived a suicide attempt (LaRue, seeing his depression, had put blanks in Hunter's revolver); Furillo uses a favor from Daniels to avoid an Internal Affairs investigation of Hunter, then confronts Hunter about his state of mind. Belker is devastated and blames himself when a man who uses a wheelchair that he had arrested previously dies after helping him to go undercover as a disabled person and make an arrest. In the middleweight boxing finals, Hill falls prey to a rope-a-dope and is felled with one punch. Judge Cole is arrested for corruption as it becomes clear that the corruption runs deep, possibly including the entire vice squad of Midtown Precinct. Belker and Tataglia's relationship continues to get more serious. Michael Conrad again appears only at roll call with slurred speech due to his worsening cancer. George Wallace appears as Judge Milton Cole. NOTE: This episode portrays dangerously false information concerning the deadly consequences of blank cartridges fired at close range. In real life, Hunter would have died; many fatal accidents have occurred from muzzle flash, concussion, and fragments from blanks. Less than a year after this episode aired, actor Jon-Erik Hexum died from a "blank" fired at close range. Similar incidents include the death of Brandon Lee, son of Bruce Lee.
67	10	"The Russians Are Coming"	Randa Haines	Story by : Jeffrey Lewis & Dennis Cooper; Teleplay by : Dennis Cooper	December 15, 1983
Three "Russian" journalists from the Soviet Republic of Georgia (now the independent Republic of Georgia) visit the Hill, where one attempts to defect. It transpires that he and the female delegate are in a relationship which has been complicated by the advances of the third delegate, a KGB officer. The matter is resolved without international incident. Belker goes undercover with an ambulance crew, and strikes up an unlikely relationship with the ambulance driver (Bruno Kirby) arising at first out of a shared diet. A temporary freeze on promotions upsets Bates, who is still awaiting a vacant sergeant's post. A young man with mental instability who is shot by police leaves a dependent dog whom Bates adopts, ironically naming him "Sarge". Furillo spots Goldblume kissing Fay. Note: Michael Conrad (Philip Freemason Esterhaus) makes his final appearance. Richard Brooks (actor) makes his screen debut as Tyrone Crane.
68	11	"Ratman and Bobbin"	Richard Compton	Story by : Steven Bochco & Jeffrey Lewis & David Milch; Teleplay by : Jeffrey Lewis & Michael Wagner & Karen Hall & Mark Frost	January 12, 1984
For the first time, Lieutenant Goldblume conducts Roll Call, filling in for Sergeant Esterhaus who is said to be "in for a check-up". Rats have infested the station house, but a man wearing evening dress and playing an accordion (Ron Rifkin) seems to lure them away, just as he promised. A cop killer is at large, causing anxiety. Belker goes undercover as a bag lady, and is slashed with a knife. Coffey and Bates staff an experimental police office within a housing project. Drawing on his recent suicide attempt, Hunter talks a woman out of suicide when Goldblume has failed to do so. Witnessing an armed robbery on his way home, Captain Furillo shoots the robber dead. Joyce Davenport learns that she is unable to have children. Joe Pantoliano appears as Sonny Orsini, Ron Rifkin as Monty DiMair, James Avery as Tolliver, and Connie Sawyer as "Bag Lady".
69	12	"Nichols from Heaven"	Thomas Carter	Story by : Steven Bochco & Jeffrey Lewis & David Milch; Teleplay by : Dennis Cooper	January 19, 1984
Esterhaus is said to be in hospital for tests. For the second consecutive episode, Lieutenant Goldblume conducts Roll Call. Hill senses something wrong with his girlfriend, but she is gunned down before he can find out what. The cop killer is caught and arrested, but then discovered to be a copy-cat killer, with the original killer still at large. Nonetheless, the copy-cat killer helps implicate the corrupt Midtown cops being investigated secretly by Furillo, Calletano, LaRue, and Washington (with DA Irwin Bernstein). The rats return, but a better musician (in a dinner jacket) lures them away with bagpipes and deposits them in a fire station. Robert O'Reilly appears as Nolan, and Harrison Page as John Fox.
70	13	"Fuchs Me? Fuchs You!"	Arthur Allan Seidelman	Story by : Steven Bochco & Jeffrey Lewis & David Milch; Teleplay by : Michael Wagner & David Milch & Karen Hall & Mark Frost	January 26, 1984
Two cops are transferred from Polk Avenue and are quickly joined by the third member of a love triangle, resulting in one shooting another. Coffey is shot and wounded by the cop killer. Goldblume takes his third roll call, but says Esterhaus will be "back tomorrow". The cop killer turns out to be the proprietor of the local cop hang-out cafe - he is arrested after nearly shooting Hunter. A social assembly of lieutenants and captains is interrupted by Washington, LaRue, and Goldblume as they arrest Lieutenant Tony Marino. The whole corruption ring at Midtown vice crumbles. Furillo is forced to tell Hill that his girlfriend was not only part of the Midtown corruption but also Marino's lover. Captain Fuchs is humiliated, and shown up as a poor manager - and his friendship with Furillo ends as they disagree over events. Linda Hamilton begins a four episode run as Sandy Valpariso.
71	14	"Grace Under Pressure"	Rick Wallace	Story by : Steven Bochco & Jeffrey Lewis & David Milch; Teleplay by : Jeffrey Lewis & Michael Wagner & Karen Hall & Mark Frost	February 2, 1984
Sergeant Phil Esterhaus dies while making love with Grace Gardner, and Captain Furillo announces the death at Roll Call, shocking the officers. In a double blow for Leo, he discovers his wife to be having an affair. Belker is let down by his backup (Hill and Renko) on an undercover operation, and the city suffers multiple lawsuits in consequence. Coffey's girlfriend Sandy (Linda Hamilton) is raped by a man recently released from prison as a non-violent offender. Jesus Martinez trades information for the release of two juvenile Diablos. Fay Furillo is arrested for prostitution by Officer Pfiezer, much to his embarrassment. Lucille Bates is offered promotion to sergeant, and the opportunity to take Esterhaus' job as Desk Sergeant - a thought which scares her. For the first time, Michael Conrad (Phil Esterhaus) does not appear in the opening credits. Renowned writer and producer Dean Devlin makes a rare acting appearance, John Hancock appears as Nolan, Jane Kaczmarek begins a 6 episode run as Officer Pilsky, and Lawrence Hilton-Jacobs plays Theodus Nickleson. Note- In 1997 TV Guide ranked this episode number 49 on its "100 Greatest Episodes of All Time" list.
72	15	"The Other Side of Oneness"	Alexander Singer	Story by : Steven Bochco & Jeffrey Lewis & David Milch; Teleplay by : Michael Wagner & David Milch & Mark Frost & Roger Director	February 9, 1984
A high class call girl (Kay Lenz) dominates the episode - particularly her relationship with Goldblume. Chief Daniels steals two videotapes of Goldblume's call girl having sex with prominent clients; he admits to Furillo that he (Daniels) appears on these two tapes. Furillo reads a last letter from Esterhaus to the officers at Roll Call, and then tries to find a legal way to scatter Esterhaus' ashes on the Hill. Bates tells Coffey that her promotion to Roll-Call Sergeant is to be announced the next day; still in mental turmoil from the rape of his girlfriend, Coffey is less than supportive, and his lack of support also ruins his relationship with Sandy. Former Captain Fuchs arrives to advertise his new private security consultancy and meets with disdain from Furillo and harsh words from Belker, who, because of his close relationship with Esterhaus, is taking his death particularly hard. The juvenile Diablos Jesus Martinez had released commit murder and then hold Leo Schnitz at knife-point; Jesus convinces them to surrender, but they are killed at Juvenile Hall later that night. Mr. Le Jardin from Divisional Accountancy arrives undercover to identify a petty thief, and discovers that Leo has been taking stationery home for personal use. At the end of the episode, the call girl - who was selling her story to the media - is found murdered. After being removed from the opening credits in the previous episode, Michael Conrad (Phil Esterhaus) appears in it as before. David Paymer appears as Michael Shapiro
73	16	"Parting is Such Sweep Sorrow"	Gregory Hoblit	Story by : Steven Bochco & Jeffrey Lewis & David Milch; Teleplay by : Jeffrey Lewis & Michael Wagner & David Milch & Mark Frost	February 16, 1984
The previous episode's murdered call girl may yet be avenged thanks to the evidence of her "manager", until he too is executed in the station, by an assassin dressed as a police officer. The police chaplain leads a memorial service for Phil Esterhaus. Bates' promotion is announced, but her first roll call goes badly, particularly as she reacts to the stealing of the podium; nonetheless, she gains respect during the episode. Renko develops what may have been a hernia, lifting a heavy woman stuck in a bath. The overcrowding of cells continues. Esterhaus' ashes are scattered on the road, at the very center of the Hill, as he requested, by a nocturnal gathering of officers; a street sweeper then sweeps them away. Natalie DeRoy arrives - a new khaki officer to assist Leo Schnitz. This episode marks the last appearance of Michael Conrad in the opening credits.: Clarence Williams III of Mod Squad fame guests as Lester Menley, Edward James Olmos plays Judge Cruz, and Bruce French appears as Chaplain.
74	17	"The End of Logan's Run"	Christian I. Nyby II	Story by : Steven Bochco & Jeffrey Lewis & David Milch; Teleplay by : Jeffrey Lewis & David Milch & Karen Hall & Mark Frost	March 1, 1984
Belker's recurring pickpocket is shot and killed - his real name finally emerging as James Logan; Belker reacts badly and breaks up with Robin, but she refuses to accept it. Fay and Goldblume also break up, but agree to remain friends. Deputy Chief Briscoe proves an annoyance to Furillo and Mayor Cleveland an even greater one, especially after Furillo is misquoted in the press over "Operation Stop and Cop", an operation Cleveland personally backed. The Mullins brothers appear - William is arrested and brother Timothy murders the key witness (Scatman Crothers). Joyce Davenport witnesses this murder but refuses to identify Mullins, fearing for her own life. Alan Wachtel becomes a judge, much to everyone's surprise. Cleveland refuses to believe Furillo was misquoted and threatens to make the captain pay for it. Bates misses the streets and the camaraderie with other street cops but Furillo encourages her and tells her it is time she put on her sergeant's stripes. From this episode and onwards, Michael Conrad (Phil Esterhaus) does not appear in the opening credits.
75	18	"The Count of Monte Tasco"	Rick Wallace	Story by : Steven Bochco & Jeffrey Lewis & David Milch; Teleplay by : Jeffrey Lewis & Michael Wagner & Mark Frost & Roger Director	March 8, 1984
A genial census worker (Barry Corbin) is taken hostage and murdered, much to the dismay of his bodyguards, Hill and Renko, who were called away to back up other officers on the order of Deputy Chief Briscoe. Joyce Davenport agrees to testify against Timothy Mullins, but both brothers issue death threats against her. Furillo, most in need of his command to defend her, is relieved of duties by Chief Daniels on the orders of Mayor Cleveland. Cleveland is unhappy with Furillo's apology concerning his comments about "Operation Stop and Cop" and reassigns Furillo to command a task force at Division. Joyce accuses Furillo of failing to protect her, resulting in recovering alcoholic Furillo purchasing a fifth of Scotch. In the personal storylines, Renko's girlfriend Daryl Ann is pregnant, and Hunter dates both Bates and Fay Furillo, while looking for a partner - both turn him down (The lunch-date with Bates actually takes place in the previous episode) Kiel Martin (J.D. LaRue) does not appear in this episode; LaRue's absence is explained as due to infectious mononucleosis. This episode marks the first appearance of Ken Olin (Harry Garibaldi).
76	19	"Nutcracker Suite"	Arthur Allan Seidelman	Story by : Steven Bochco & Jeffrey Lewis & David Milch; Teleplay by : Michael Wagner & David Milch & Karen Hall & Mark Frost	March 15, 1984
In a packed episode, "Operation Stop and Cop" continues to claim victims as Pilsky is shot and killed by a fleeing suspect; her delay in returning fire was caused by her "officer-involved" shooting the previous day. Bates and Briscoe argue publicly when the Deputy Chief denies that he ordered Pilsky's deployment; her death also affects Hunter, who had planned a date with her. Washington surrenders a video tape to Calletano showing Chief Daniels having sex with a prostitute (see Episode 72 above); Calletano uses the tape as leverage to facilitate Furillo's return to command Hill Street. Washington, Garibaldi and Belker, with Goldblume's approval, follow William Mullins all day cutting off his access to drugs until he slips up: when he refuses to surrender after committing an armed robbery, he is shot dead by the detectives after firing at them. Renko proposes nervously to Daryl Ann. Jesus Martinez marries his pregnant girlfriend (avoiding a conviction for her, as she had threatened him with a gun). Furillo, narrowly avoiding drinking the alcohol he has bought, seeks out his AA sponsor - only to discover that the sponsor has returned to hard drink himself and is in denial about the consequences. The episode title comes from a minor storyline about a legal battle between a man whose genitals became caught in a whirlpool drain and the distraught therapist who didn't release the power switch until he was punched. Kiel Martin (J.D. LaRue) does not appear in this episode.
77	20	"Hair Apparent"	Corey Allen	Story by : Steven Bochco & Jeffrey Lewis & David Milch & Mark Frost; Teleplay by : Jeffrey Lewis & Michael Wagner & Karen Hall & Roger Director	May 3, 1984
The title comes from Judge Wachtel's wig as he wears a wire to help the DA's office convict a group of Mafia-connected loan sharks. The Hill Street precinct is also targeting them (with Belker, Renko, and Hill undercover), as is the State Liquor Authority, leading to considerable confusion and a SLA bust that nearly collapses the entire operation. Garibaldi does some unofficial investigation to avoid being sued after he crashed without insurance - Washington assists him, successfully. Marcus Peabody, a former gang member, is accused of corruption and embarrasses his new employer, Mayor Cleveland, who fires him. Natalie continues to admire Leo and discourages his attempts to regain the affections of his wife. Hunter's proposed "Equine Rapid Development Force" is rejected under budget cuts, even though he had bought his own horse (Apollo) to save the city money. Exhausted over their jobs leaking into their private life, Joyce and Frank separate at her suggestion. Kiel Martin (J.D. LaRue) does not appear in this episode. Andy Garcia appears as gang member Ernesto.
78	21	"Lucky Ducks"	Rick Wallace	Story by : Steven Bochco & Jeffrey Lewis & David Milch & Karen Hall; Teleplay by : Michael Wagner & David Milch & Karen Hall & Mark Frost	May 10, 1984
Lieutenant Calletano appears on the TV game show Lucky Ducks and does very well until he freezes on the question that would have guaranteed his winnings, losing everything. Peabody, back in charge of the Blood and seeking quick money to finance a gang war, approaches the group of Mafia-connected loan sharks which Belker has infiltrated. Peabody becomes too aggressive with the loan sharks, and they arrange to have him killed, leading to their arrests. Davenport's current client seems in a huge hurry to get through arraignment, which may mean he has an out-of-state record. Renko tries to marshal his wedding attendants - Hill (Best Man), Washington, Coffey, and Davis. At the rehearsal dinner, Darryl Ann's father is belittling of his daughter, the police, and especially Hill, whom he addresses by the epithet "boy". Lieutenant Hunter is increasingly worried about Apollo, his horse, who is seriously ill; the episode ends with Hunter settling down to a night in the stable with Apollo. Kiel Martin (J.D. LaRue) does not appear in this episode.
79	22	"Eva's Brawn"	Gregory Hoblit	Story by : Steven Bochco & Jeffrey Lewis & David Milch; Teleplay by : Jeffrey Lewis & David Milch & Mark Frost & Roger Director	May 17, 1984
Belker is in demand from his Mafia prisoners after they hijack the prison bus transporting them to their incarceration. A guard is killed, but the prisoners are eventually recaptured. Goldblume and Garibaldi try video-dating, but Goldblume ends up arresting his first contact for solicitation. In order to make up a deficit to buy Renko's wedding gift, Coffey bets on a horse. Renko, after initial cold feet, finally marries Daryl Ann; J.D. LaRue, now recovered, is able to attend. Martinez and Calletano secure a gang cease-fire, but Martinez is attacked and wounded inside the station. Hunter's horse, Apollo, dies; but he secures a date with a fellow wedding guest at Renko's marriage, when she is attracted by his horse smell. Furillo and Davenport share one last night together before she leaves for Paris.

=== Season 5 (1984–85) ===
No. overall	No. in season	Title	Directed by	Written by	Original release date	Prod. code
80	1	"Mayo, Hold the Pickle"	Rick Wallace	Teleplay by : Jeffrey Lewis & Mark Frost; Story by : Steven Bochco & Jeffrey Lewis & David Milch	September 27, 1984	4401
In a busy pre-titles opening sequence, the viewer is introduced to Sergeant Stan Jablonski (Robert Prosky), a 22-year veteran from the Polk Avenue Precinct; he has transferred after an altercation with female Lieutenant Vera Horvath (Sharon Barr), in which the latter was struck a blow, alleged by Jablonski to have been self-defense. Sergeant Bates returns to motor patrol as a street sergeant, explained by Jablonski as being an extra sergeant post created by "adding the Jefferson renewal to the Hill Street Precinct". The new Sergeant's catchphrase is heard for the first time: "Let's do it to them, before they do it to us". The sequence ends with Jablonski being knocked down by his nemesis from Polk Avenue, she having turned up at Hill street, despite being subject to psychological assessment and treatment. In the rest of the episode: Celestine Grey (Juney Smith) is to be executed for raping and murdering a nun (which he denies) (episode 3.1), resulting in much consternation; Goldblume's opposition is reported in the press. An all-night ordeal of robbery and torture leads to a war hero, Mr. Parsons, dying in hospital, while police comfort his widow. Belker is undercover at a seedy hotel. Fay Furillo starts full time at the station as a Victim Aid Counselor (also covering the Polk Avenue Precinct). An unfortunate couple from New York (Michael Tucker and Jill Eikenberry) are repeatedly robbed, but rescued by Bates and Coffey. An unusual man stealing ice cream is found to be preserving the body of his dead mother. Detective Mayo goes on a date with Furillo, although he turns down a proposed night together - luckily, as Davenport elects to return after their four-month separation and Laura Ann Renko (Andrew Renko's daughter) is born. The opening credits feature new pictures for all main characters except Barbara Bosson (Fay Furillo), Betty Thomas (Lucy Bates) and Veronica Hamel (Joyce Davenport). With Prosky, Robert Hirschfeld ("Khaki Officer" Leo Schnitz), Mimi Kuzyk (Detective Patricia Mayo) and Ken Olin (Detective Harry Garibaldi) added to the credits, this season has the highest number of credited main characters, with 17.
81	2	"Watt a Way to Go"	Rick Wallace	Teleplay by : David Milch & Roger Director; Story by : Steven Bochco & Jeffrey Lewis & David Milch	October 4, 1984	4402
Rachel Goldblume is raped in her own bed during the night with daughter Annie (Jennifer Ursitti) and son Josh asleep in the next room. She won't press charges, but Henry Goldblume takes fingerprints, identifies the suspect, arrests him roughly, and secures a conviction on outstanding warrants. The poor New York couple (see previous episode) are robbed again while withdrawing money wired to them; they are then caught up in a hostage situation when Belker's hotel undercover goes wrong. At another hostage situation, a man holding his wife is shot dead by EAT officers with 23-year-old Officer Foster expressing delight, which is caught by TV cameras. Celestine Grey is finally executed, with Frank and Joyce in reluctant attendance. In a closing ironic paradox LaRue picks up a girl in a bar by pretending to be Henry Goldblume (using her anti-capital punishment sensibilities), while the real Goldblume stands in the cold outside Grey's prison, joining a group of Christians praying for Grey as he is executed.
82	3	"Rookie Nookie"	Gregory Hoblit	Teleplay by : Steven Bochco & Jeffrey Lewis and David Milch & Roger Director; Story by : Steven Bochco & Jeffrey Lewis and David Milch & Mark Frost	October 18, 1984	4404
When Lieutenant Hunter upsets clerk-typist Rhonda Kimmel, she barricades herself in the male toilet. Belker goes undercover dressed as a chicken, and loses a suspect due to the well-intentioned interference of a mime artist. After his impersonation of Henry Goldblume blows up in his face, LaRue spends the night with Cathleen McConnell, the victim of a car-jacking, but during the night she receives news of the murder of her husband and LaRue wonders if he has been set up as an alibi. An illegal cable TV installer is arrested, and Davenport turns out to be one of his customers; she is unwittingly involved, but Furillo uses the situation to engineer a humorous end to their separation. Rachel Goldblume's rapist is released on bail, murders his girlfriend, and is re-arrested. Two new rookie officers cause trouble; Laurence "Larry" Swann (Tim Robbins) by his timidness, and Randall "Randy" Buttman (Michael Biehn) by his arrogance and insubordination, leading to first day reprimands from Sergeant Bates and Captain Furillo. At an end-of-shift gathering of rookies from across the precincts, Swann is tied up and stripped, and forced to engage in sexual activity with a prostitute in front of the other rookies.
83	4	"Fowl Play"	Gregory Hoblit	Teleplay by : Mark Frost; Story by : Steven Bochco & Jeffrey Lewis & David Milch	October 25, 1984	4405
Unable to cope with his humiliation, Officer Swann hangs himself. The independent witness (the prostitute involved) is found murdered, after Buttman had taken a 45-minute unauthorized absence over which Bates writes him up for abandoning patrol without authorization. A peeping Tom in the station's women's restroom falls through the ceiling. Belker discovers a drug ring in his fried chicken undercover. A TV crew tails Renko and Hill, filming Renko's four morning doughnut stops and leading to both Renko's on-air embarrassment . . . and a possible romantic interest between Hill and the attractive reporter who told the story. Rookie Ronnie Garfield (Polk Avenue Precinct) comes forward to implicate Buttman, who is arrested in Swann's hazing and suicide. LaRue spends another night with McConnell and shoots an intruder during the night. A $6,000 grant for an administrative research post of two hours per week leads to fierce competition between the three Lieutenants (Hunter, Calletano, and Goldblume) until Furillo finally elects to return the grant.
84	5	"Bangladesh Slowly"	Rick Wallace	Teleplay by : Steven Bochco & Jeffrey Lewis & David Milch & Roger Director; Story by : Steven Bochco & Jeffrey Lewis & David Milch	November 1, 1984	4406
A local Indian restaurant attracts many Hill Street Station personnel (including Lieutenants Hunter and Goldblume and Fay Furillo) for its reduced rate lunch just as Sergeant Bates leads a raid to arrest the chefs and the owner and recover a number of stolen local cats waiting to be cooked. Renko has a more positive TV appearance after arresting the prostitute serial murderer (Arliss Howard). The McConnell intruder turns out to be the man who shot her husband, and LaRue agrees to wear a wire to trap her. Henry questions Buttman and discovers the disgraced rookie is also an anti-Semite. All the rookies involved in the Swann incident are sacked, including Garfield, leading Washington to challenge Chief Daniels and then resign. Daniels later agrees to 21 days without pay instead for Garfield, and Washington returns after a talk with Furillo and re-assuring Garfield. Hill and Renko arrest an incredibly fat man abusing an "all you can eat" buffet lunch. Leo Schnitz and fellow desk khaki officer Natalie have a date that culminates in Natalie kissing Leo passionately, but Leo spoils it when he admits he's still in love with his estranged wife.
85	6	"Ewe and Me, Babe"	Jeff Bleckner	Story by : Floyd Byars; Teleplay by : David Stenn	November 8, 1984	4408
A man is found dead in an apartment with a sheep tethered in the bathroom, prompting bizarre speculations. The Reverend Booker Simons is murdered, but because his killer is also the only witness in a major anti-drug operation involving violent Colombians he is able to plea-bargain a greatly reduced charge when Fay leaks information to Simons' widow which is overheard by the suspect's lawyer, Joyce Davenport. Inspector Joe Keenan almost comes to blows with Frank concerning overlapping jurisdiction between the precinct and Special Narcotics. Jesus Martinez appears in a new manifestation as a paralegal aid to Attorney Brown. Prostitute Lotta Gue (pronounced "goo") has her third arrest for soliciting in 48 hours; but Lieutenant Hunter, who has developed a soft spot for her, lets her go. Miguel Ferrer appears as Carlos, a drug dealer.
86	7	"Blues for Mr. Green"	Bill Duke	Teleplay by : Elia Katz; Story by : Steven Bochco & Jeffrey Lewis & David Milch	November 15, 1984	4407
Floyd Green (Forest Whitaker), convicted for murder as a child, is released from custody having completed his sentence. Now 18, he is monitored by Hill Street officers who find him rapidly getting into trouble again. Later, during an armed hostage-taking in court by another prisoner, Green tries to escape in the confusion, but is instead accidentally shot dead in the crossfire. Fabian De Witt, a regular character for the remainder of the show's history, is introduced in this episode; one sister is dead due to a drug overdose, another (Penny Johnson Jerald, billed as Penny Johnson) is an under-age prostitute and their prostitute mother is absent. Fabian goes to live with Sergeant Bates, who was later to adopt the boy. Belker is sent to Las Vegas to escort a prisoner home. A large number of the other male officers also go after LaRue secures a block of cheap airline tickets from a grateful travel agent whose robbery LaRue has solved. All these officers (who include Lieutenants Calletano and Hunter) report themselves sick to avoid duty.
87	8	"Fuched Again"	Scott Brazil	Teleplay by : Jeffrey Lewis & David Milch & Mark Frost & Jacob Epstein; Story by : Steven Bochco & Jeffrey Lewis & David Milch	November 22, 1984	4409
The episode is dominated by "The Monarch Project"—the restoration of the Monarch Theater in the Hill Street district. In two related storylines, widespread corruption is uncovered which reaches into the office of Chief Daniels; and Mayor Cleveland is the victim of an assassination attempt. In Vegas, Belker (the only non-gambler) takes his free pull on a gaming machine and wins the $5,000 jackpot. Coffey borrows and loses much of the money, and later steals most of the rest. Belker collects his prisoner, who dies of a heart attack while handcuffed to Belker. Hill and Renko deal with an immigrant (Saul Rubinek) whose winning lottery ticket is stolen and then offered back to him through a broker in return for half the $3,000 winnings. This arrangement ends in tragedy for the family and career trouble for Hill and Renko. Joe Keenan, head of the narcotics squad, is implicated as the corrupt officer in Chief Daniels' office. Meanwhile, the man accused of shooting the mayor is assassinated on his way to court; his shooter is later identified as former police Captain (and former friend of Furillo) Jerry Fuchs. Fabian is in trouble for skipping school as he and Bates adjust to their new relationship.
88	9	"Low Blow"	Rick Wallace	Teleplay by : Jeffrey Lewis & David Milch & Mark Frost & Jacob Epstein; Story by : Steven Bochco & Jeffrey Lewis & David Milch	November 29, 1984	4410
Thanksgiving spirit abounds. "The Cisco Kid" (Martin Ferrero) returns as an Indian. Jerry Fuchs dies of a heart attack, so Captain Furillo uses "what Jerry might have said" to strong-arm Biff Lowe (Paul Gleason) into wearing a wire while meeting with the Barletta brothers. The sting works, as the Barlettas incriminate themselves in the attempt on Mayor Cleveland's life. The Vegas crew prepares to come home, not knowing that J.D.'s rubber check has meant that their return trip tickets have been pulled by the travel agent; furthermore, the agent has informed Captain Furillo that they are in Vegas and not "sick" as they had reported. Belker and Coffey regain both their lost money and their friendship. Myrna Schnitz confesses that she is pregnant, broke and miserable in Vegas and returns to the Hill with the guys; Leo takes her back without hesitation. Fabian's mother — a hardcore junkie — is arrested and brought in to Hill Street where Bates tells her the fate of her three children. Fabian finds out that Bates has met with his mother and is very upset that she didn't tell him. They attend his mother's arraignment, where she opts for detox. Vera Horvath, after weeks of harassing phone calls and stalking Jablonski, shows up to tell him that she actually has loved him all along. When Jablonski tells her that he just wants to be friends, she opens fire and is killed by other officers at the station. Robin also breaks up with Belker.
89	10	"The Rise and Fall of Paul the Wall"	Thomas Carter	Story by : Michael Wagner; Teleplay by : Jacob Epstein	December 6, 1984	4403
Mayo and Garibaldi investigate when Councilman Detweiler's mother shoots an intruder; Hill and Renko arrest a notorious loan shark with over $300 in outstanding parking fines who later dies in the precinct holding cell; a distraught man threatens to set fire to his wife and child (Joaquin Phoenix, billed as Leaf Phoenix), whom he believes are possessed by the Devil; and Belker is kidnapped and abused by a group of winos who also steal his badge and gun.
90	11	"Last Chance Salon"	Christian I. Nyby II	Roger Director	December 13, 1984	4411
Renewed gang activity involves a small local grocery store and its owners; Belker takes his rage over Robin's decision to discontinue seeing him out on his frightened informant (Sam Anderson) while working undercover at a beauty parlor, Garibaldi cuts corners both to help a young hooker and in his night school class; and Furillo must work against Chief Daniels to head off a major street gang battle.
91	12	"Intestinal Fortitude"	Scott Brazil	Teleplay by : Elia Katz & David Stenn; Story by : Steven Bochco & Jeffrey Lewis & David Milch	January 10, 1985	4412
Belker, LaRue and Washington work undercover as garbagemen to investigate a protection racket; Fay tries to help an elderly rape victim identify her assailants; Renko runs for PBA representative; Bernstein tells Davenport she is a candidate for an opening in the DA's office; Mayo gets proof that the Hispanic rape suspect can speak English.
92	13	"Of Human Garbage"	Christian I. Nyby II	Teleplay by : Jeffrey Lewis & David Milch & Mark Frost & Jacob Epstein; Story by : Steven Bochco and Jeffrey Lewis & David Milch	January 17, 1985	4413
The undercover trash mission continues; Officer Perez rescues a family from a burning building, but something doesn't seem right; a Federal witness is kidnapped; and Fay reports the suspicious chairside technique of dentist Ted Rose.
93	14	"Dr. Hoof and Mouth"	John Patterson	Teleplay by : David Stenn & Elia Katz; Story by : Steven Bochco & Jeffrey Lewis and David Milch	January 24, 1985	4414
Joyce introduces a new PD (Frances McDormand) to the Hill before leaving to become an ADA; LaRue gloats over the videotape evidence of Mayo's undercover visit to Dr. Ted Rose; Fabian's mother reclaims him; and Hill and Renko deal with a man with several outstanding warrants and who has just lost his entire family to a hit and run driver but suddenly withdraws his identification.
94	15	"Davenport in a Storm"	Gabrielle Beaumont	Teleplay by : Jeffrey Lewis and David Milch & Mark Frost & Roger Director; Story by : Steven Bochco and Jeffrey Lewis & David Milch	January 31, 1985	4415
Belker temporarily moves into Hunter's RV; new ADA Davenport faces opposition when she plans to prosecute three white teens for the vicious beating of a young black athlete; Furillo's car accident starts an investigation into illegal gun sales by Al DiPiano; and Mayo has a date with Chief Daniels.: Jesse John Bochco, the real-life son of Barbara Bosson and Stephen Bochco, guests as Frank Furillo, Jr.
95	16	"Washington Deceased"	Mark Frost	Frank South	February 7, 1985	4416
LaRue, who has been moonlighting on a low budget horror picture, "borrows" one of the props for a joke on an obnoxious detective, but in the end gets a taste of his own medicine; a department accountant dogs Furillo; and Chief Daniels engages in sexual harassment against Mayo by using his position to punish her for refusing his advances the night before, but offers an apology later after being confronted by Furillo and realizing his mistakes. Belker turns thirty-seven, but what starts out as a gloomy day becomes an unexpected birthday celebration.
96	17	"Passage to Libya"	Christian I. Nyby II	Teleplay by : David Milch & Jacob Epstein & Elia Katz; Story by : Steven Bochco & Jeffrey Lewis and David Milch & Michael Wagner	February 14, 1985	4417
Belker keeps running up against a bitter one-man-band; Gina Srignoli (Jennifer Tilly) agrees to wear a wire in an effort to incriminate Al DiPiano; Fay goes a little too far to help a welfare mother assaulted by her abusive boyfriend; and Howard tries to sell his RV only to have it stolen by the first interested party; Belker and Jablonski's relationship is strained by Belker's renewed relationship with Robin Tattaglia.
97	18	"El Capitan"	Georg Stanford Brown	Teleplay by : Jeffrey Lewis & David Milch & Roger Director & Elia Katz; Story by : Steven Bochco & Jeffrey Lewis & David Milch	February 21, 1985	4418
Calletano takes over command while Furillo attends an encounter group for precinct captains and their superiors; Hill and Renko drink some tea brought in by Calletano that turns out to be spiked with marijuana; Goldblume is bemused but elated by his new relationship with Gina Srignoli, to Garibaldi's annoyance; the man who stole Hunter's RV and also had stolen his son after a custody dispute takes Lucy's temporary partner, Officer Buzhardt, hostage; at the encounter group, Daniels is so furious because he learns that the captains barely respect him that he threatens the career of one outspoken captain, and Furillo remains composed during the encounter group until a fellow captain makes a snide remark about his "Barbie doll wife"; Belker and Jablonski repair their relationship.
98	19	"The Life and Time of Dominic Florio Jr."	John Patterson	Teleplay by : Jeffrey Lewis & David Milch & Mark Frost & Jacob Epstein; Story by : Steven Bochco & Jeffrey Lewis & David Milch	March 21, 1985	4419
An anti-abortion agitator sends a woman (Patricia Wettig, Ken Olin's real-life wife and thirtysomething co-star) into premature labor; Jablonski can't get his 300 game sanctioned by the Bowling Congress; LaRue and Washington tape a home security video for an adult film director (Brent Spiner); Fay and Garibaldi both resent Goldblume's relationship with Gina Srignoli, but for slightly different reasons. Rene Enriquez (Lieutenant Ray Calletano) does not appear in this episode.
99	20	"G.Q."	Gabrielle Beaumont	Teleplay by : Jeffrey Lewis & Roger Director and Jacob Epstein & Elia Katz; Story by : Steven Bochco & Jeffrey Lewis and David Milch & Michael Wagner	March 28, 1985	4420
The arson squad questions Jablonski about the fire at BowlMor Lanes; Hill and Renko remain at odds over Andy's apparent cowardice, which leads to no one wanting to partner with Andy; Bates and Coffey are assigned to make a wino presentable for his appearance in court; Furillo gets a copy of LaRue's slightly altered home security video; and ADA Davenport is the only person who believes in the innocence of a young man accused of trying to burglarize a car at the volatile O'Neil Projects.
100	21	"Queen for a Day"	Gregory Hoblit	Teleplay by : David Milch & Mark Frost & Jacob Epstein & Elia Katz; Story by : Steven Bochco & Jeffrey Lewis & David Milch	April 11, 1985	4421
A hooker sweep for gays and straights snares Coffey's former high school coach (James Tolkan); Renko joins Belker on his drug undercover, which is collapsed - literally - by Hunter and his new, battering-ram-equipped tank; Hill's hesitation leads to his new partner being blindsided, causing Hill to rethink what happened with Renko; Davenport rejoins the Public Defenders office; PD Connie Chapman (Frances McDormand) is fired for cocaine use; Goldblume tries to make peace with Fay and Garibaldi by inviting them to dinner with Gina and him.
101	22	"You're in Alice's"	Scott Brazil	Story by : Steven Bochco & Jeffrey Lewis and David Milch; Teleplay by : Jeffrey Lewis & David Milch and Roger Director and Jacob Epstein	May 9, 1985	4422
Detective Phil Dugan cuts some corners to catch an elusive mobster; feeling kept out of the loop, Goldblume pursues a solitary investigation into Gina's death and learns more than he bargained for; Hill and Renko try to help a homeless family caught up in red tape; Coffey rides with Jablonski, with both successful and almost tragic results; Calletano and Hunter test for the captain's position, and the results are a surprise to both of them; and everyone faces a random drug screening.
102	23	"Grin and Bear It"	Gregory Hoblit	Teleplay by : Jeffrey Lewis & David Milch & Mark Frost & Elia Katz; Story by : Steven Bochco & Jeffrey Lewis & David Milch	May 16, 1985	4423
Belker's drycleaners undercover catches not only the corrupt Midtown detectives but also Dugan, who offers them Joe Keenan and a major ring of police corruption; Goldblume wrestles with Gina's estate and discovers he may inherit a fortune; Hill and Renko's duty of escorting "Officer McBear" turns out to be no walk in the woods; Furillo copes with the results of the random drug test. James Cromwell plays Officer McBear's keeper.

=== Season 6 (1985–86) ===
No. overall	No. in season	Title	Directed by	Written by	Original release date	Prod. code
103	1	"Blues in the Night"	Ben Bolt	Teleplay by : David Milch & Walon Green and Jacob Epstein; Story by : Steven Bochco & Jeffrey Lewis & David Milch and Barry Jay Kaplan	September 26, 1985	5407
At roll call, the entire cast appears to have been replaced; it is revealed that this is roll call of the night shift (Lawrence Tierney plays the roll call sergeant Jenkins), while the program then follows the nocturnal activities of the day shift officers. Renko bets LaRue that he has a better driving route to the station house, planning to use his winnings to pay for a backstage pass he has purchased to meet his favorite musician, Bobby Angel; unfortunately, his idol turns out to have feet of clay (or, in this case, cocaine). Belker spends the night undercover in a dumpster waiting to arrest a cat burglar, but receives bad news about his mother's death. Joyce and Frank attend a bizarre dinner party. Jablonski spends the night at home alone (except for his dog). Lucy has some ceramics fired by a charming, but married, pottery instructor (Harper), on whom she develops a crush. Bobby and Joe try to mediate an argument about a dog stuffed into a washing machine. Henry Goldblume, while trying to mediate a dispute with militant group S.O.I.L., is taken captive at the command of their psychotic leader (Yaphet Kotto). The credits no longer feature a freeze-frame of each lead actor, but are displayed over a short clip of the actor in a scene from the show, and the footage behind the credits appears color-faded for the entire season. Dennis Franz (Norman Buntz) is added to the credits, while Barbara Bosson (Fay Furillo), Robert Hirschfeld ("Khaki Officer" Leo Schnitz), Mimi Kuzyk (Detective Patricia Mayo), and Ken Olin (Detective Harry Garibaldi) have been removed.
104	2	"Hacked to Pieces"	Rick Wallace	Teleplay by : David Milch; Story by : Jeffrey Lewis & David Milch	October 3, 1985	5401
Lieutenant Calletano is nominated to be Captain of the Polk Avenue Precinct. Lieutenant Buntz is transferred from the Heights to take his place, and he facilitates the departure of the current Captain at Polk Avenue to ensure he keeps his position. Furillo must mediate between Mayor Cleveland and his wife when their son, Lee, is arrested on a narcotics charge; he is also placed in charge of a special corruption taskforce by Chief Daniels. Hill and Renko try to mediate tensions between a Korean storeowner and his Black clientele. Belker's car is destroyed by a car bomb on the day his girlfriend, Robin Tataglia, discovers that she's pregnant. Garibaldi, deep in debt to a loan shark, considers going bad to cover his debts; he decides not to do the bidding of his new loan shark and is fatally stabbed. Beginning with this episode, the majority of episodes begin with a pre-shift scene of one of the regulars before showing Roll Call.
105	3	"Seoul on Ice"	John Patterson	Jeffrey Lewis & David Milch	October 17, 1985	5402
A runner trying to raise money for cancer research is exploited by his coach; Garibaldi's death shakes the station house; Hill takes a direct interest in helping a black youth who robbed the Korean store get a job at the store; Furillo begins choosing personnel for the new commission on police corruption; the Lee Cleveland case comes to a tragic end and Mayor Cleveland comes to the end of his rope; Howard gets a shock from and about his latest love interest; khaki officers Leo and Natalie elope. Gregory Itzin plays Dr Kaplan, a hospital administrator.
106	4	"In the Belly of the Bus"	Alexander Singer	Teleplay by : Jeffrey Lewis & David Milch & Walon Green & Jacob Epstein; Story by : Jeffrey Lewis & David Milch & Walon Green	October 24, 1985	5403
Lieutenant Buntz is introduced to a new partner, Detective Manny Rodriguez (Del Zamora). They arrest a criminal, handcuffed to a boiler room valve, who holds a key to Keenan's death as well as having been the man responsible for stabbing Garibaldi; the suspect is later shot while in station custody by Garibaldi's father. Belker, undercover at the bus terminal, is knocked out and loaded on a bus inside luggage. Hunter adopts a Shar Pei puppy and unwittingly joins a ponzi scheme. The Buntz/Sid the Snitch relationship begins in this episode.
107	5	"Somewhere Over the Rambo"	Stan Lathan	Jacob Epstein & Walon Green & Dick Wolf	October 31, 1985	5410
Furillo's corruption commission delivers its findings and antagonizes Daniels, who implies a threat to Furillo's career; Daniels' willingness to sacrifice a night shift cop involved in an off-duty shooting that has incited public opinion has tragic results; Alan Branford returns, this time as Rambo, but comes to a tragic end after two more arrests; after exposing a corrupt division personnel officer sending incompetent female khakis who got their jobs in return for sexual favors, Buntz explores his duties as personnel officer in his own way. The new desk officer, Celeste Pattersen, makes her debut. Hunter meets dog trainer, Prunella Ashton-Wilks, for the first time.
108	6	"Oh, You Kid"	John D. Hancock	Robert Ward	November 7, 1985	5408
Buntz catches a mugger only to lose him when the victim won't press charges. He later kills him during an armed robbery. Captain Furillo accuses him of intentional assassination, which he denies. Bates and Coffey have to deal with a sculptor who refuses to let anyone remove his (to some) obscene work of art. Lynnetta harangues Neal about his lack of commitment to her and her 10-year-old son, with tragic results. Belker goes undercover to learn why so many vagrants have fallen from high buildings recently and gets taken for an unexpected ride.
109	7	"An Oy for an Oy"	Ben Bolt	Story by : Elia Katz; Teleplay by : Jacob Epstein	November 14, 1985	5405
Sgt. Jablonski risks his own money to catch a pair of confidence men (one played by Michael Richards) in an undercover action that goes wrong; Belker acts as a courier for a pair of devious Hasidic jewelry merchants; Washington deals with the emotional aftermath of his being shot; and Captain Calletano reacts badly when Buntz accuses a lazy Polk Avenue officer of dumping vagrants in Hill Street precinct. Belker proposes to his girlfriend.
110	8	"Fathers and Huns"	Stan Lathan	Walon Green	November 21, 1985	5406
Furillo is under pressure to accept a plea bargain from a drug baron to prevent mayhem on the streets where the supply is being withheld; Goldblume has to protect a parade by blatantly anti-semitic neo-fascists, a detail that may clash with Belker's current undercover; Hill's dad visits to tell his son that he is dying, a claim Bobby isn't buying; Renko guilt-trips Hill about the way he treats his father; Belker flips out when Robin is injured in a bust of narcotics-seekers at a local clinic leading to tension in their relationship.
111	9	"What Are Friends For?"	John Patterson	Dick Wolf	December 5, 1985	5422
Belker goes undercover at the pound on a case involving animals being illegally sold for scientific testing; Buntz and Rodriguez are taken prisoner by a sadistic serial murderer (Tommy Joe Page) from Buntz's past who has escaped from a psychiatric hospital; a former major league baseball player (Tony Cotina) stopped by Washington and LaRue on a DUI is found to have a stash of drugs in his trunk, but the drugs may not be his. A journalist (Harry Steele from the magazine 'Warrior Review') is at the precinct to do a profile on Lieutenant Hunter. Robin and Belker have relationship problems. Furillo and Davenport try to buy a house. Chief Daniels is still furious with Furillo. Robin almost miscarries. Prunella Ashton-Wilks consoles Hunter after Steele decides to feature Buntz instead of him as an 'Urban Warrior'in an upcoming magazine issue.
112	10	"The Virgin and the Turkey"	John D. Hancock	Teleplay by : David Milch & Walon Green & Robert Ward; Story by : Jeffrey Lewis & Walon Green & Robert Ward	December 12, 1985	5413
Furillo and Bates have a day off and Goldblume is in charge. Bates bumps into her pottery instructor while shopping and sparks fly. Coffey tries to mediate between an irate landlord and a tenant who insists an image on his water-stained wall is that of the Virgin Mary; the Furillos try to renew a family relationship with his parents; Buntz uses "Officer Giblet", a turkey, to make a drug bust (the arrestee, Burton, played by Tim Russ); Former gang boss, Jésus Martinez, acts as legal counsel for Burton. The guys compete in a benefit "Olympics" competition against the local fire station personnel; Belker and Robin celebrate Christmas with a momentous decision.
113	11	"Two Easy Pieces"	Gabrielle Beaumont	Teleplay by : Jacob Epstein & Dick Wolf & Robert Ward; Story by : Jeffrey Lewis & Walon Green & David Milch	January 9, 1986	5417
Belker and Robin are planning to get married after work, but first Belker has undercover work infiltrating drug dealers; LaRue's practical joke on Renko backfires; rookie officer Ron Garfield shoots a criminal threatening him with a gun, but matters get complicated because his partner, Stegger, tries to help; a cooler containing a transplant heart is stolen from a crashed ambulance and has to be recovered within four hours; Lucy Bates reencounters Fabian DeWitt's mother.
114	12	"Say It as It Plays"	Stan Lathan	Teleplay by : Walon Green & Jacob Epstein & Dick Wolf & Robert Ward; Story by : Jeffrey Lewis & David Milch & Dick Wolf	January 16, 1986	5418
The Internal Affairs investigation of officer Garfield continues; Belker's wedding to Robin has been rescheduled for this evening, but he is still undercover; Harper turns up at the precinct to file a complaint against Bates; Hill and Renko get a shock when delivering a corpse at the morgue - one of the corpses is Hill's father. Fabian surprises Lucy.
115	13	"Das Blues"	Scott Brazil	Teleplay by : Jeffrey Lewis & David Milch & Jacob Epstein & Dick Wolf; Story by : Jeffrey Lewis & David Milch & Robert Ward	January 23, 1986	5423
Fabian has turned up unannounced to stay with Bates; Hill returns home with his father's body; Hunter hits his head falling into the station basement and begins hallucinating that he's being held prisoner on a Russian freighter; Buntz is unhappy at being involved by an ex-colleague in shaking down a loan shark; Furillo is approached by a politician who thinks he should stand for mayor; Sid the Snitch is given the task of delivering Belker and Robin's wedding present, who finally get married. Grace Zabriskie plays a tattoo artist, fence and snake owner. Joe E. Tata makes the first of two appearances as Fratelli.
116	14	"Scales of Justice"	Christian I. Nyby II	Teleplay by : David Milch & Jacob Epstein & Dick Wolf & Robert Ward; Story by : Jeffrey Lewis & David Milch	January 30, 1986	5425
A smoking ban at the precinct causes tempers to fray; Bates faces a tough decision about Fabian; LaRue and Washington are still staking out the tattoo parlor for a murderer; Buntz is on the trail of a new drugs supply that's killing some of the users; Bobby Hill meets an old childhood friend.
117	15	"I Want My Hill Street Blues"	Gabrielle Beaumont	Teleplay by : John Mankiewicz & Russ Woody; Story by : John Mankiewicz	February 6, 1986	5404
Belker goes undercover to expose a corrupt parole officer; Goldblume clashes with Furillo over Goldblume's attempts to use his position to delay demolition of some low-rent housing in his new neighborhood; Bates makes a deal with Vivian DeWitt to sign guardianship papers for Fabian; Jablonski tries to cope with a crew making a music video in the station house, while LaRue attempts to make a quick $100 by renting out Lt. Hunter's dog to the production crew as his own; comic relief in the episode includes a hefty man who sits on people, then demands to be paid to get up. Liz Sheridan, the second Seinfeld regular this season, plays one of the older residents.
118	16	"Remembrance of Hits Past"	Ben Bolt	Teleplay by : Walon Green; Story by : Jeffrey Lewis & David Milch & Walon Green	February 13, 1986	5420
A mobster mentioned in previous seasons is extradited from Italy to stand trial locally. Before he can testify at the trial, Furillo is gunned down on the courthouse steps. The entire department mobilizes as Furillo fights for his life in the ICU. As she waits, Joyce remembers how she and Frank first met seven years before, at a trial connected to the same mobster, and how their romance developed. It is also revealed how Furillo earned the nickname 'Pizza Man'.
119	17	"Larry of Arabia"	Christian I. Nyby II	Teleplay by : Jeffrey Lewis & David Milch & Jacob Epstein & John William See; Story by : Jeffrey Lewis & David Milch & Jerry Patrick Brown	February 27, 1986	5412
Buntz makes a fool of himself on a courtroom TV show where he is appearing as a witness in support of his nephew; Coffey discovers that Fabian's mother is extorting Bates for additional cash and after making clear to the mother that no more cash will be forthcoming, he insists on shepherding Bates through the process of filing official guardianship papers; LaRue and Renko try to use evidence money and a phone number found on a dead courier to complete the "buy" and bust a big case, but it gets them into deep water when the erstwhile buyers turn out to be FBI agents conducting a sting; an elderly woman (Frances Bay) threatens to blow Belker's cover at a pawnshop; tragedy hits as an off-duty Coffey is shot and killed after walking into a robbery in progress.
120	18	"Iced Coffey"	Georg Stanford Brown	Teleplay by : Jeffrey Lewis & David Milch & Duncan Smith; Story by : Dick Wolf & Robert Ward & Robert Schlitt & Duncan Smith	March 6, 1986	5426
Bates agonizes over identifying a man suspected of killing Joe Coffey; while undercover at a supermarket, Belker is harassed by an overzealous security guard; Hunter is told to uncover a petty thief within the station - with surprising results and reasons that hit close to home; a prostitute sells out Jesus Martinez and Attorney Brown in a bribery scandal involving a judge.
121	19	"Jagga the Hunk"	Gabrielle Beaumont	Teleplay by : David Milch & Walon Green & Dick Wolf & Jacob Epstein; Story by : Jeffrey Lewis & David Milch & Dick Wolf	March 13, 1986	5411
Jesus Martinez is hiding out following Attorney Brown's death, trying to broker a meeting with Furillo, who is hoping to get him to incriminate Judge Hardin, but LaRue and Washington bust Martinez and endanger the deal; Belker is undercover at a building site aiming to catch a loan shark; a new officer, Kate McBride (Lindsay Crouse), is partnered with Bates; a man claiming to be Prunella's husband asks Hunter to arrange a meeting; Buntz's ex-partner asks him to smooth over a colleague, who is later found dead.
122	20	"Look Homeward, Ninja"	John Patterson	Jeffrey Lewis & David Milch & Walon Green	March 20, 1986	5427
A prostitute accuses McBride of trying to blackmail her, and in the process of discussing the false charges with Bates, McBride confides that she is a lesbian; two new officers, Ron Lipsky (Chris Noth) and Michael Galva, are called to deal with a suicidal man; Ballantine's mental health problems continue; Furillo is courted by a group of men to run for mayor; Buntz has to decide what to do about his ex-partner Tommy Donahue, whom he suspects of murdering a fellow officer. Laurence Fishburne appears as a pimp.
123	21	"Slum Enchanted Evening"	Michael Switzer	Teleplay by : Walon Green & Robert Ward; Story by : Jonathan Lemkin & Michael Wagner	March 27, 1986	5428
Belker meets former informant Eddie Gregg (Charles Levin) (Episodes 3.1,8-11), who is dying of AIDS; Judge Wachtel sentences a slumlord to live in one of his own buildings, but Hill and Renko have a difficult time keeping him there; Internal Affairs are investigating Buntz, unconvinced that he shot Donahue in self-defense, and his ex-captain seems out to get him; Furillo is determined to get to the truth of the Buntz case, but his actions may derail other people's plans for his future; Hunter receives a blowpipe that causes him all sorts of unexpected problems.
124	22	"Come and Get It"	Scott Brazil	Robert Schlitt	April 3, 1986	5414
Hill and Renko rescue suspected multiple murderer and rapist Albert Sawyer (Paul McCrane) from a mob; a media and political circus ensues, with the arrest bringing out the worst in a lot of people; because of a mistake in judgement, Belker almost isn't there when Robin goes into labor; she delivers a healthy baby boy (whom they later name Philip, after deceased Desk Sergeant Esterhaus). Earl Boen plays a press agent exploiting the arrest.

=== Season 7 (1986–87) ===
No. overall	No. in season	Title	Directed by	Written by	Original release date
125	1	"Suitcase"	Stan Lathan	Teleplay by : David Milch & John Romano; Story by : David Milch & John Romano & Darrell Vienna	October 2, 1986
A suitcase containing eighty pounds of cocaine is stolen by a small-time dealer (Jack Kehler) after a light aircraft crash. Sid the Snitch and Buntz get involved as potential buyers, but a more-established dealer kills the small-time dealer and kidnaps Buntz at gunpoint; Buntz eventually kills him. (This plot line initially appears to be self-contained, but returns in the final two episodes of the series, setting up a spinoff series.) Belker is undercover among homeless people looking into a hotel-voucher scam. Goldblume investigates a case of poison substituted for aspirin tablets at a drug store. Jablonski's angina is worsening, and Furillo threatens to involuntarily retire him if he doesn't seek medical care.
126	2	"A Case of Klapp"	Scott Brazil	Terry Curtis Fox	October 9, 1986
After Hunter shoots a boy caught robbing a convenience store, Internal Affairs finds that neither his firearm nor the bullets used were department-issue, leaving Hunter subject to dismissal from the force; Belker struggles to protect senior citizens from a violent mugger; the public defenders are engaging in a work slow-down to protest recent cuts in their workforce, eventually electing to strike.; Judge Wachtel insults Davenport repeatedly from the bench, leading Davenport to slap him across the face and Wachtel to have her arrested for battery; Jablonski takes voluntary retirement in the face of upcoming coronary artery bypass surgery.
127	3	"The Best Defense"	John Patterson	Teleplay by : Steve Bello & Robert Ward; Story by : Steve Bello & Robert Ward & Jonathan Lemkin	October 16, 1986
Hunter is demoted to Sergeant as a result of the Internal Affairs investigation, and Furillo convinces him to take over the Desk Sergeant position; with the public defenders on strike, the officers must use discretion in making borderline arrests as the station overflows with suspects; Belker finds the storeowner cashing the checks of the mugged senior citizens; while Belker tries to get the name of the criminal from the shopowner, LaRue reopens the store - acting as the storeowner - and catches the criminal when he comes in to cash another stolen check; the public defenders return to work after the cuts are rescinded; Jablonski undergoes successful bypass surgery. Robert Clohessy (Officer Patrick Flaherty) joins the opening credits.
128	4	"Bald Ambition"	Ben Bolt	Jeffrey Lewis	October 30, 1986
Chief Daniels asks Furillo to intervene at the Polk Avenue Precinct, where racial tensions are simmering and Captain Calletano - derisively nicknamed "Captain Taco" by his officers (a nickname that first cropped up in episode 6.7) - has been unable to control the tensions, but Calletano denies there is a problem and vehemently resists help; Furillo looks on sadly as a brawl between white and black Polk Avenue officers erupts after a black officer is shot, and Calletano is unable to stop it; Internal Affairs is investigating Buntz after several people he has arrested have been burglarized while in custody; Buntz traces the burglaries to the man feeding names to Sid the Snitch, who has been forwarding those names to Buntz for arrest; Hill becomes a minor celebrity after catching a baby thrown from a fourth-story window. Rene Enriquez (Captain Ray Calletano) returns to the opening credits; James B. Sikking (Sgt. Howard Hunter) now appears in the credits wearing his Desk Sergeant's blues instead of his EAT khakis. Added to the guest star credits (after the opening credits) is "Also Starring Jon Cypher as Chief Daniels". Chazz Palminteri appears as Sonny Cappelito.
129	5	"I Come on My Knees"	Don Weis	David Milch	November 6, 1986
After Captain Calletano loses command of Polk Avenue and is reassigned to Division, he threatens to go to the press; several Polk Avenue officers are fired outright or reassigned; Officer James Sanders is transferred to Hill Street and is treated as a pariah; a college friend of Goldblume turns vigilante, with fatal consequences for criminals, police, and ultimately himself; Renko's damaged car is stolen by a hood who offers to get him full replacement cost from his insurance; Renko backs out, and the hood returns his car; Buntz explains his hostility for Flaherty - Flaherty turned in his partner, an old friend of Buntz's; a hit man attempts to kill Sid, but Buntz kills the hit man instead; Jablonski asks to return to the police force. Megan Gallagher (Officer Tina Russo) is added to the opening credits; Betty Thomas (Sgt. Bates) takes over Robert Prosky's (Retired Sgt. Stan Jablonski) spot, while Prosky now appears not wearing a police uniform.
130	6	"Say Uncle"	Gabrielle Beaumont	John Romano	November 13, 1986
Renowned mobster "Uncle John" Petruzzi is expected to be assassinated prior to going to jail; Russo is beaten and raped by her mobster "boyfriend" while trying to discover the location and time of the hit; Belker counsels Russo on how to be an undercover cop; LaRue and Washington arrest a purse snatcher who then confesses to several high-profile murders, but further research reveals that he has not committed the crimes; Furillo has to intervene to help Ray Calletano, who is testing Chief Daniels' patience to the limit, and Calletano decides to resign; Jablonski assists Belker on an arrest. Taurean Blacque's credit is re-shot to reflect his shaving off his beard.
131	7	"Amazing Grace"	Don Weis	Teleplay by : Robert Ward; Story by : David Milch & Robert Ward	November 27, 1986
Grace Gardner, a character from the early seasons who dated Sergeant Esterhaus, returns as a nun planning outreach work on the Hill and Flaherty is assigned as liaison; Councilman Wade, out for personal glory, repeatedly jeopardizes the precinct's battle against drugs, shoots an unarmed juvenile dealer, claiming self-defense, and is arrested by Washington; Belker and Buntz (separately) are working on drug busts; Buntz is forced to delay his bust due to a lack of supporting officers and has his finger cut off in retaliation by the loan shark who bankrolled his buy; Jablonski is hoping to return to police work, but experiences a flare of his chest pain and is not cleared by the police surgeon; Goldblume has a new lady in his life: the producer of a TV talk show. Rene Enriquez is removed from the opening credits. CCH Pounder appears as Ms. Jones, making the last of three appearances as different characters.
132	8	"Falling from Grace"	Dale White	Terry Curtis Fox	December 2, 1986
Councilman Wade attempts to derail Furillo's investigation of his shooting by revealing details from Washington's personnel file to the press to discredit the detective; Furillo and Washington discover the conspiracy that allowed Wade access to Washington's file, and Wade is arrested for the conspiracy; Grace Gardner's vocation is challenged by her attraction to Flaherty; Buntz chooses to be the one who arrests the loan shark who clipped his finger, but though he tries for a clean bust, the loan shark pulls a gun and Buntz is forced to shoot him; a literary agent, unimpressed by the manuscript of Goldblume's deceased friend, offers Goldblume the chance to write his memoirs. Robert Prosky is removed from the opening credits; Frances Conroy plays a customer of the car park Belker is undercover at, and Brian George plays a real estate agent.
133	9	"Fathers and Guns"	Ed Sherin	Teleplay by : Jeffrey Lewis; Story by : Jeffrey Lewis & Jerry Patrick Brown	December 9, 1986
Captain Furillo is advised that his father was shot and killed during a robbery; when he investigates and discovers that his father had a brain tumor and killed himself due to the pain, for his mother's sake Furillo disposes of the suicide weapon and uses his pull with the police to avoid having the case classified as a suicide; Belker - who has been suffering from nightmares regarding nuclear war - takes charge of an abandoned baby and then gets involved with the father's plight; a Korean restaurateur tows LaRue's car from his parking lot and LaRue retaliates by releasing rats in his restaurant and notifying the Board of Health. Unusually, this episode includes several dream sequences and a flashback.
134	10	"More Skinned Against Than Skinning"	Dale White	David Black	December 23, 1986
Racial tensions escalate when a white undercover officer (Sam McMurray) shoots his black partner; Buntz has temporarily lost his sight and goes undercover with Belker, posing as a beggar; a store-owner causes disturbance by displaying Nazi artefacts in his store; enraged because he was made to look like a liar in front of his black officers, Furillo strong-arms Chief Daniels into an apology to them over the shooting incident--and gets unexpected help when detective Patricia Mayo storms into Daniels' office during their meeting and resigns from the force over Daniels' unethical police pressures to renew their personal relationship. James McDaniel plays Mason, one of the black officers.
135	11	"She's So Fein"	Christian I. Nyby II	Marjorie David	January 6, 1987
LaRue thinks he has a chance with a new public defender, Sharon Fein, until she asks Washington for a date; later that day, Fein allows a criminal in the interrogation room to snatch a gun from her; he kidnaps Davenport at gunpoint and decamps from the station, eventually becoming holed up at a convenience store after shooting the owner; Davenport manages to broker an amnesty; Belker wrecks a car belonging to LaRue's brother-in-law while chasing a robber, and the car is later discovered to contain stolen parts; Sharon and Washington's date involves dinner with her parents, whose behavior sours Washington on becoming involved with her.
136	12	"A Wasted Weekend"	John Patterson	David Mamet	January 13, 1987
Jablonski, Renko and Hill go on a deer-hunting weekend; after being accosted by state troopers, breaking into the wrong cabin, and recalling war-time experiences, the weekend is cut short when Hill steps on a spike during the hunt; Henry Goldblume, who had planned to join them, is sidetracked by a speech to the Boy Scouts, an unstable woman who accuses him of raping her in the Captain's office, and a lack of money; he is then kidnapped by a serial robber who, upon learning that Goldblume is a police officer, forces him to dig his own grave before leaving in Goldblume's car; Officer McBride voices uncertainty and regret after shooting an armed robber, until Buntz mentors her. Unusually, this episode starts with the opening credits - no Roll Call or other pre-credits footage. The episode was playwright David Mamet's first script ever accepted for television, which included the recurring character played by his wife, Lindsay Crouse. Robert Prosky returns to the opening credits---shown in a T-shirt instead of his former police uniform. Also, in the first act after the intro, Jablonski's alarm clock suggests the time of day to be just after 5:30 A.M.
137	13	"City of Refuse"	Don Weis	Peter Silverman	January 20, 1987
During a strike by refuse collectors, the police take over collections, with dramatic consequences when a gangland funeral interferes with a refuse collection route; Hunter is asked to take command of an EAT unit at a siege after their lieutenant is injured by the gunman, who turns out to be none other than Jack Ballantine, Hunter's former EAT second-in-command; Russo and Flaherty try to deal with an angry old deaf man who has been in a fight with crack addicts and who ends up shot by police after he doesn't hear their command to drop his shotgun; Russo and Flaherty sleep together.
138	14	"Der Roachenkavalier"	Christian I. Nyby II	Christian Williams & Bob Woodward	February 3, 1987
LaRue becomes obsessed with a radio contest to find the largest live cockroach; he loses the contest, but busts a wanted felon when he shows up to enter the contest; Buntz is worried about the state of Furillo's marriage, based on a (erroneous) tip; a drug user, released on bail after Goldblume changes his charge from a felony to a misdemeanor, kills a grandmother while intoxicated; Goldblume is suspended, but takes his complaints regarding understaffing to Chief Daniels and TV, with his actions resulting in not only a reversal of his suspension but also an authorization for 3 new judges, 40 new police cadets, and a study for building a new prison; Belker adopts a dog whose previous owner had trained him to snatch purses.
139	15	"Norman Conquest"	Dale White	Teleplay by : Steve Bello; Story by : Steve Bello & Neil Eglash & Jonathan Lemkin & Michael Wagner	February 10, 1987
Due to a clerical change, the Hill Street Precinct is $130,000 short of their quota for seized narcotics, and is at risk of losing funding for overtime, and Buntz, in command for the day, mounts a campaign to meet the quota; Belker busts a tough kid named "Fetch" who bites and runs drugs; Russo and Flaherty bust a disowned snitch who tips them to a mobile drug lab, but the bust literally goes up in flames; Inspector Scapizzi sends his new girlfriend to the Hill to redecorate the station house, but Buntz catches her stealing cocaine from the property room and the bust allows Hill Street to meet their quota.
140	16	"Sorry, Wrong Number"	Christian I. Nyby II	Ron Koertge	March 3, 1987
Seven members of a family are murdered in their home; Goldblume reluctantly tries to use a former member of the Blood as an informant, but the head of the Blood immediately identifies him as a "snitch"; Belker lucks into the identity of the murderers when he busts a low-level drug dealer who met the murderers immediately after the crime; Renko has both urine and vomit thrown upon him during his patrol, but his day improves when he delivers a baby girl and the parents name the child after him (Andrea); at the end of the episode, the head of the Blood is found dead and Goldblume's informant is suspected of the homicide.
141	17	"The Cookie Crumbles"	John Patterson	Robert Ward	March 10, 1987
A jealous Renko confronts his wife about her relationship with her business partner in her cookie-making company, and at the end of the episode, he sleeps with a classmate from night school; a Hill Street officer with limited fluency in Spanish shoots an innocent Hispanic when he doesn't understand what he's saying; Ray Calletano, now representing the Latin-American Coalition, threatens a lawsuit on the victim's behalf - until he finds out that Furillo would bear the blame; Flaherty's romantic involvement with Russo begins to interfere with work, resulting in Bates dressing down both of them after she is slashed due to Flaherty's inattentiveness; Goldblume finds his informant, who did indeed kill the head of the Blood, and is forced to kill him when he turns a gun on him; Belker, acting on a tip from a snitch, buys stolen credit cards, but is shot in his car in the final scene. Rene Enriquez (Ray Calletano) returns to the opening credits for this episode only.
142	18	"Dogsbreath Afternoon"	Christian I. Nyby II	Story by : George Goldsmith & Jeff Melvoin & Jerome Portman; Teleplay by : George Goldsmith & Jeff Melvoin	March 17, 1987
Belker survives the shooting and is rushed to the hospital with a bullet near his spine; Buntz brutalizes Belker's snitch to get the name of Belker's contact, who refuses to provide any information and is later found dead; Furillo, who is blaming himself for Belker's injury, takes Buntz off the case, but Buntz continues investigating anyway and finds a District Attorney's investigator with connections to the stolen credit cards, Belker's contact and Belker himself; the investigator kills himself when Buntz, LaRue, and Washington arrive to question him; Renko discovers the hard way that the night school classmate with whom he had his one-night stand is a hooker---who tries to blackmail him, and he and Daryl Ann part after he confesses to sleeping with his ex-classmate, nullifying the woman's blackmail attempt, and Daryl Ann confesses her own affair with her business partner; Flaherty and Russo also part company after a drugged Russo calls for another man; Sergeant Hunter is restored to his former rank of Lieutenant and resumes command of the EAT; Belker moves his hands and feet in his hospital bed, relieving his wife, Robin, and his colleagues. Robert Prosky (Stan Jablonski) returns to the opening credits for this episode and the next.
143	19	"Days of Swine and Roses"	John Patterson	Story by : John Litvack & David Black; Teleplay by : David Black	March 31, 1987
The city is full of stunts after a radio station challenges citizens to commit "outrageous acts"; this includes gang members (one played by Cuba Gooding Jr) releasing a live piglet into the Hill Street squad room; with Hunter resuming command of the EAT, Bates resumes Desk Sergeant duties; Hill and Renko are assigned a new unit (2403), state of the art, and computer-controlled - with disastrous results, which include Renko inadvertently winning the radio competition when he accidentally causes the unit's computer to disrupt traffic lights along a fifty-block length of Dekker Avenue; Belker returns to the precinct intending to ease back into his work; Renko forgives Darryl Ann, who is still uncertain about forgiving Renko just yet; Jablonski's badge is found on an arrested prostitute, and Belker gives it back to Jablonski, who voices frustration that he could not prevent the theft; while investigating a possible Indian burial mound in a house's basement, Hunter and a friend are caught in a cave-in. Don Cheadle plays Darius Milton.
144	20	"The Runner Falls on His Kisser"	Ken Lavet	Jody Taylor Worth	April 7, 1987
A famous American football player (Keenen Ivory Wayans) is arrested for soliciting, but his high-powered attorney and Chief Daniels intervene to reduce the charges and protect his reputation; given 20-1 odds against beating the department's four-time marksmanship champion, LaRue's syndicate bets $400 on Buntz, but Buntz loses by two points in the final round of competition; Furillo backs a loan for his brother, whose construction company is in debt after missing a completion date on a project; fears grow as Lieutenant Hunter fails to report for duty, and his former paramour Prunella returns from Samoa to search for him. Unusually, this episode begins without the usual on-screen opening time check, though Furillo quotes the time as 6:30 A.M. after examining his own bedside alarm clock.
145	21	"A Pound of Flesh"	Don Weis	Christian Williams	May 5, 1987
Lieutenant Hunter is found alive after 11 days, and it is discovered that his friend had been dead for a week, and - under a pact with Hunter - Hunter ate a portion of him to stay alive; Hunter discusses this with Furillo (who advises him not to discuss it) and Prunella (who leaves him); Lieutenant Buntz is accused of stealing a kilogram of cocaine from the suitcase in Episode 1; a box containing $17,000 (actually belonging to his late friend Donahue) is found in Buntz's apartment, leading Internal Affairs to suspend him; Grace Gardner returns to the precinct after having left the convent after finding her "concept of love" incompatible with chastity; she now works with a condom-distribution company and informs Furillo that the company installs machines free for law enforcement agencies, as "Our motto is the same as yours: To protect and serve." The sister of Jesus Martinez is apparently kidnapped shortly before her wedding to a member of the Gypsy Boys; when it is discovered that she actually loves a member of the Shamrocks, Jesus gives his blessing for them to be married; LaRue narrowly escapes death and rides a rollercoaster of emotion, finally breaking down sobbing in Washington's arms. Bryan Cranston plays Buntz's PBA counsellor.
146	22	"It Ain't Over Till It's Over"	Stan Lathan	Jeffrey Lewis & David Milch & John Romano	May 12, 1987
The final episode. The Hill Street stationhouse is gutted by fire, though the basic structure still stands; Lieutenant Buntz, Captain Furillo, and Sidney Thurston investigate the case against Buntz and uncover a plot to frame Buntz, in which Internal Affairs Investigator Lieutenant Jim Shipman is implicated; fearing that Shipman will flee prosecution, Buntz takes matters into his own hands and holds Shipman at gunpoint, and both are arrested: Shipman for the cover-up and Buntz for carrying a gun while suspended; when Chief Daniels announces publicly that he intends to have Buntz fired, Buntz punches the Chief in the face (a development that TV critic Ron Miller called "marvelous" in a column bidding farewell to the series); Goldblume works with a Division investigator and a prostitute to locate and arrest a notorious serial killer; Belker finally addresses his late mother's possessions; Sergeant Bates and Sal the plumber finally have dinner together, with perhaps a hint at a relationship developing; Buntz leaves the fire-damaged station in the final scene, but the last words are spoken by a constant, but low-profile, character — the night shift desk sergeant (Lawrence Tierney), who answers a ringing telephone, and states the final words of the series: "Hill Street". The Buntz plot set up the spinoff series Beverly Hills Buntz.

== Sources ==
- Museum.tv showtimes
- Epguides.com episode guide
