= Jeffrey Lewis (writer) =

American screenwriter

Jeffrey Lewis (born 1944), also known as Jeff Lewis, is an American novelist and screenwriter. He has published eight novels, most notably the four novels of The Meritocracy Quartet. In television, as a writer-producer of Hill Street Blues, he earned 12 Emmy Award nominations, eight for writing and four as a producer, winning Emmys twice. Additionally, he received eight Writers Guild of America Award nominations and won once in 1984. He was a showrunner of Hill Street Blues during its sixth season and co-showrunner with his Yale University roommate David Milch, whom he recruited to join Hill Street Blues, during its seventh season.

== Published works ==
He has published nine novels:

- Meritocracy: A Love Story (Other Press; 2004)
- The Conference of the Birds (Other Press, 2005)
- Theme Song for an Old Show (Other Press, 2007)
- Adam the King (Other Press, 2008)
- Berlin Cantata (Haus, 2012)
- The Inquisitor's Diary (Haus, 2013)
- Bealport: A Novel of a Town (Haus, 2018)
- Land of Cockaigne (Haus, 2021)
- Leonard Cohen: A Novel (Haus, 2024)

In addition, the first four novels, being interlinked, have been published in an omnibus edition, The Meritocracy Quartet (Haus, 2011).

== Early career ==
During the 1970s in New York City, Lewis took part in the collaborative staff that produced The Real World magazine. From 1974 to 1977, he was an assistant district attorney in Manhattan, an experience which informed his contributions to Hill Street Blues.

== Family and education ==
Jeffrey Lewis was born in New York City to Richard Lewis and Alice Lewis née Lisson. He has two sisters, Kathryn Lewis and Constance Dévanthery-Lewis, and a brother, Kip Lewis. He is married to Gayle Lewis and has a daughter Sarah Lewis.

He received a B.A. degree from Yale University (1966) and a J.D. degree from Harvard University (1970).

== Reception ==
Lewis's books have been widely reviewed. Samples of reviewers' comments indicate a largely favorable reception.

For Meritocracy: A Love Story:

“Meritocracy is a short novel...but what makes it big - and what makes it great - is its historical perspective and reach....While it is a reminiscence about what was, it’s ultimately a tragic story about what could have been and what wasn’t.” - Daniel Septimus, The Jerusalem Post

For Theme Song for an Old Show:

“Highly intelligent...subtle, mordant, ironic...a work of literature.” - Brandon Robshaw, The Independent.

For Adam the King:

"Lewis’s gripping fourth novel (after Theme Song for an Old Show ) traces one man’s heroic but flawed attempt to make good of past mistakes." - Publishers Weekly.

For Berlin Cantata:

“Lewis employs thirteen different voices to tell an astonishing story that raises unsettling questions about cultural and personal identity, desire across time, conspiracies of silence, exile and return, and problematizing the notion of home itself...a brilliantly conducted work by a master storyteller.” - Gary Percesepe, The Nervous Breakdown

For The Inquisitor’s Diary:

“A succinct gem of literary fiction that asks which of us are entitled to salvation.” - Evan Rodriguez, Kirkus Reviews.

For Bealport: A Novel of a Town:

“Lewis has created a rich tapestry of life. In lean, poetically precise prose he lays bare the realities of a town in decline and reveals the fears, secrets and aspirations that animate ordinary lives. This highly accomplished short novel is a moving and humane portrait of small-town contemporary America.” - Simon Humphreys, Irish Mail on Sunday.

“Comparisons between Jeffrey Lewis's deft, bittersweet portrait of a Maine community and Thornton Wilder’s 1938 stage classic Our Town are inevitable. Both vividly evoke the interwoven lives of individuals with an easy, down-home style that masks something larger and darker. In Wilder’s case, it’s the inevitability of death. In Lewis’s, it’s the destructive force of greed... [Lewis's] prose is fluent and beautiful with a light, witty touch and he can evoke a character in just a few lines.” - Nick Curtis, Evening Standard.

== Other Television Work ==
Lewis was the co-creator (with Steven Bochco) of Bay City Blues, the co-creator (with David Milch) of Beverly Hills Buntz, and the creator of Lifestories, the latter show in particular earning recognition for the episode "Steve Burdick," during the AIDS crisis.

== Awards ==
The following is an award summary for Lewis. Primetime Emmy Award (All for Outstanding Writing for a Drama Series)

| Year | Show | Episode | Writer(s) | Network |
|---|---|---|---|---|
| 1982 | Hill Street Blues | "Freedom's Last Stand" | Steven Bochco, Michael Kozoll, Jeff Lewis, Michael Wagner, Anthony Yerkovich | NBC |
| 1982 | Hill Street Blues | "Personal Foul" | Steven Bochco, Jeff Lewis, Michael Wagner, Anthony Yerkovich | NBC |
| 1983 | Hill Street Blues | "Eugene's Comedy Empire Strikes Back" | Steven Bochco, Karen Hall, Jeff Lewis, David Milch, Anthony Yerkovich | NBC |
| 1983 | Hill Street Blues | "A Hair of the Dog" | Steven Bochco, Jeff Lewis, Anthony Yerkovich | NBC |
| 1983 | Hill Street Blues | "No Body's Perfect" | Steven Bochco, Jeff Lewis, David Milch, Michael Wagner, Anthony Yerkovich | NBC |
| 1984 | Hill Street Blues | "Doris in Wonderland" | Steven Bochco, Jeff Lewis, David Milch, Peter Silverman | NBC |
| 1984 | Hill Street Blues | "Grace Under Pressure" | Steven Bochco, Mark Frost, Karen Hall, Jeff Lewis, David Milch, Michael Wagner | NBC |
| 1987 | Hill Street Blues | "It Ain't Over Till It's Over" | Jeff Lewis, David Milch, John Romano | NBC |

Also credited for Primetime Emmy Award for Outstanding Drama Series nominations in 1984, 1985, 1986, with 1984 being a win.

Humanitas Prize for 60 Minute Network or Syndicated Television
1985 Ceremony (11th annual): Hill Street Blues - Teleplay by David Milch & Roger Director Story by Steven Bochco, Jeffrey Lewis, David Milch for "Watt a Way to Go" - Nominee

Writers Guild of America Award (all Best Screenplay – Episodic Drama)

1982: Hill Street Blues - Jeffrey Lewis for "Fruits of the Poisonous Tree" - Nominee
1983: Hill Street Blues - Teleplay by Anthony Yerkovich, David Milch, Karen Hall Story by Steven Bochco, Anthony Yerkovich, Jeffrey Lewis for "Eugene's Comedy Empire Strikes Back" - Nominee
1983: Hill Street Blues - David Milch, Jeffrey Lewis, Michael Wagner for "Gung Ho!" - Nominee
1984: Hill Street Blues - Teleplay by Jeffrey Lewis, Michael Wagner, Karen Hall, Mark Frost Story by Steven Bochco, Jeffrey Lewis, David Milch for "Grace Under Pressure"
1984: Hill Street Blues - Teleplay by Jeffrey Lewis, Michael Wagner, David Milch, Mark Frost Story by Steven Bochco, Jeffrey Lewis, David Milch for "Parting Is Such Sweep Sorrow" - Nominee
1985: Hill Street Blues - Teleplay by David Milch & Roger Director Story by Steven Bochco, Jeffrey Lewis, David Milch for "Watt a Way to Go" - Nominee
1986: Hill Street Blues - Teleplay by Walon Green Story by Jeffrey Lewis, David Milch, Walon Green for "Remembrance of Hits Past" - Nominee
1987: Hill Street Blues - Teleplay by Jeffrey Lewis Story by Jeffrey Lewis & Jerry Patrick Brown for "Fathers and Guns" - Nominee
