= Probe (1988 TV series) =

- Genre: Science fiction
- Created by: Isaac Asimov; Michael Wagner
- Starring: Parker Stevenson; Ashley Crow
- Composer: Sylvester Levay
- Country of origin: United States
- Original language: English
- No. of seasons: 1
- No. of episodes: 8

Production
- Executive producers: Michael Wagner; Alan J. Levi
- Producers: Stephen Caldwell; Michael Piller
- Running time: 60 minutes
- Production company: MCA Television

Original release
- Network: ABC
- Release: March 7 – April 14, 1988

Probe is an American science fiction television series, created by veteran television writer Michael Wagner and science fiction author Isaac Asimov. It aired on ABC. Michael Wagner wrote the two-hour pilot, and became Executive Producer for the series. The pilot and series starred Parker Stevenson as Austin James, an asocial genius who solved high tech crimes, and Ashley Crow as James's new secretary Mickey Castle.

The show began on March 7, 1988 as a mid-season replacement, and was canceled in April after a two-month run of the pilot and six episodes. Reruns then ran from May 19 to June 25, 1988. Entire episodes have made their way on the Internet through video-sharing sites including YouTube. It has never been officially released on home media, although it did re-air in the mid-1990s on the Sci-Fi Channel in its block of short-lived TV series.

Some episodes of the show revolved around Serendip, a company founded by Austin that he has no interest in running. Mickey, his Serendip-appointed secretary, plays Dr. Watson to Austin's Holmes.

== Characters ==
- Austin James (played by Parker Stevenson): A genius-level scientist and inventor with eidetic memory, Austin is constantly thinking, inventing ground-breaking technology and seeking answers to various mysteries and problems. One disadvantage to his vast intellect is that it isolated him from his peers from a very early age. As a result, he is awkward and uncomfortable in normal social situations, and very reclusive. His manner can be at times overly brusque, but he has a deep love of humanity. Austin is occasionally called in by local police to investigate baffling homicides, though he professes to not understand the motivation for murder. He founded the think tank Serendip, but he has no interest in managing its day-to-day affairs, preferring to spend most of his time engaged in a variety of experiments and investigations at his "workshop," a refurbished warehouse which serves as his home and laboratory.
- Michelle "Mickey" Castle (played by Ashley Crow): Mickey seems an unlikely candidate to serve as Austin James' secretary, as she lacks any background in science and relies more on her instincts instead of logic. Though she initially finds Austin's genius and eccentricities intimidating (and infuriating), Mickey comes to enjoy the adventure of working for him. Similarly, while Austin has fired every other secretary foisted upon him by Serendip, he is soon captivated by Mickey's uncanny knack for providing unique observations that help him in his investigations.
- Howard Millhouse (played by Jon Cypher): As Serendip's long-suffering director, Howard constantly finds himself at wit's end, managing the company founded by Austin, and bankrolling his various experiments. Howard's attempts to draw Austin out of his warehouse to take a more active interest in his own company have only served to make Austin keep Serendip further at bay.
- Graham McKinley (played by Clive Revill): Howard's apparent successor at Serendip who also butts heads with Austin from time to time over various projects.

== Episodes ==
No.	Title	Directed by	Written by	Original release date
1	"Computer Logic: Part 1" "Probe: Part 1"	Sandor Stern	Michael Wagner	March 7, 1988
Pilot episode: New secretary Mickey is assigned to work for company owner Austin James, an eccentric scientist and investigator. The two soon become enmeshed in two mysteries: an eccentric millionaire known for her habit of swimming in near-freezing temperatures is found dead from apparent exposure but her body is colder than the surrounding environment; and an error in Austin's water bill that leads to murders by strange mechanical and electrical malfunctions.
2	"Computer Logic: Part 2" "Probe: Part 2"	Sandor Stern	Michael Wagner	March 7, 1988
Pilot episode: New secretary Mickey is assigned to work for company owner Austin James, an eccentric scientist and investigator. The two soon become enmeshed in two mysteries: an eccentric millionaire known for her habit of swimming in near-freezing temperatures is found dead from apparent exposure but her body is colder than the surrounding environment; and an error in Austin's water bill that leads to murders by strange mechanical and electrical malfunctions.
3	"Untouched by Human Hands"	Kevin Hooks	S : Howard Brookner, Colman Dekay; T : Lee Sheldon	March 10, 1988
Austin is called in when a reactor built by Serendip malfunctions, and a staff member inside is dead. The body is inaccessible because of the high levels of radiation flooding the chamber.
4	"Black Cats Don't Walk Under Ladders (Do They?)"	Alan J. Levi	Lee Sheldon	March 17, 1988
By appealing to his scientific vanity, Mickey manages to lure Austin to a talk show/expose to act as a scientific consultant as host Marty Corrigan tries to discredit a self-proclaimed witch, Sabrina. However, the witch's curse apparently comes true after Marty drinks one of her "potions".
5	"Metamorphic Anthropoidic Prototype Over You"	Rob Bowman	S : Robert Bielak; T : Tim Burns	March 24, 1988
Austin is called in to help with investigating a claim that a "mape" (a Metamorphic Anthropoidic Prototype — i.e., an intelligent ape) is as intelligent as its sponsor, Dr. Hardwork, claims. Josephine, the mape, is indeed incredibly smart, at nearly human levels. However, an animal activist breaks into Austin's warehouse where Josephine is being kept, and is found dead, shot to death. The only suspect appears to be Josephine, as a gun was found in her cage.
6	"Now You See It..."	Robert Iscove	James Novack	March 31, 1988
Two businessmen die in elevators created by Serendip, putting Austin's future with the company in danger.
7	"Plan 10 from Outer Space"	Virgil Vogel	Michael Wagner	April 7, 1988
Mickey manages to lure Austin into visiting the desert home of science fiction author Truman Smith III. He is being plagued with strange electrical apparitions. He claims that the electrical creature is an alien being whose life Truman has been using as the basis for his "fiction", and now the alien wants a share.
8	"Quit-It"	Vincent McEveety	Philip Reed	April 14, 1988
Austin and Mickey come to the aid of a young girl who claims everyone in her neighborhood has been replaced by impostors.
