= Beverly Hills Buntz =

- Genre: Comedy drama
- Created by: David Milch; Jeffrey Lewis
- Directed by: Barnet Kellman
- Starring: Dennis Franz; Peter Jurasik; Dana Wheeler-Nicholson
- Composer: Mike Post
- Country of origin: United States
- Original language: English
- No. of seasons: 1
- No. of episodes: 13 (4 unaired)

Production
- Camera setup: Single-camera
- Running time: 30 minutes
- Production company: MTM Enterprises

Original release
- Network: NBC
- Release: November 5, 1987 – May 20, 1988

Related
- Hill Street Blues

Beverly Hills Buntz is an American comedy drama television series and a spin-off of the acclaimed police drama Hill Street Blues. Beverly Hills Buntz aired on NBC from November 5, 1987, to May 20, 1988.

== Overview ==
The show was a half-hour dramedy, a hybrid between light private eye fare and a sitcom. The main character, Norman Buntz, was previously seen as a morally and ethically questionable cop on Hill Street Blues which was a dramatic series on NBC (the show is one of a handful of examples of a series in a genre, drama, spinning off a series in another: comedy). The series has the character quitting the police force, moving to Beverly Hills, and becoming a private investigator. In a programming experiment, NBC president Brandon Tartikoff announced that the show would be a "designated hitter" and was originally given prize time slots once a month after Cheers and Night Court. The other two "designated hitters" that season were Mama's Boy, a sitcom with Bruce Weitz and Nancy Walker, and the second season of a drama, The Bronx Zoo with Ed Asner incidentally, each show was canceled in 1988). Eventually, Buntz was scheduled Fridays at 9:30pm between Night Court and Miami Vice in March 1988. Night Court and Buntz were unsuccessful, but Miami Vice gained a fifth season with an improved performance after moving from 9pm back to 10pm. Three pilots of Buntz were filmed including one by director Hal Ashby.

Nine episodes were broadcast of 13 which were filmed. The first episode was broadcast November 5, 1987 and the last on May 20, 1988. The series starred Dennis Franz as Norman Buntz, and Peter Jurasik as Sid "The Snitch" Thurston. Dana Wheeler-Nicholson joined the cast.

== Cast ==
- Dennis Franz as Norman Buntz
- Peter Jurasik as Sid Thurston
- Dana Wheeler-Nicholson as Rebecca Griswold

== Episodes ==
No.	Title	Directed by	Written by	Original release date
1	"Pilot"	Hal Ashby	Jeffrey Lewis & David Milch	November 5, 1987
2	"Fit to Be Tied"	John Patterson	Peter Silverman	November 29, 1987
3	"Sid and Randy"	Patterson	Jeffrey Lewis	December 24, 1987
4	"Duck! L'Orange!"	Eric Laneuville	Jim Kaplan	January 27, 1988
5	"Umbrella in the Water"	Ray Danton	Story by : Richard Ben-Veniste; Teleplay by : Peter Silverman	March 25, 1988
6	"Brief Encounter"	Michael Vittes	Story by : Jody Taylor; Teleplay by : Christian Williams	April 1, 1988
7	"El Norte by Norte West"	Laneuville	Story by : Christian Williams and John Eisendrath; Teleplay by : Christian Williams	April 8, 1988
8	"Buntz of the Desert"	Paul Lynch	Mark St. Germain	April 15, 1988
9	"A Christmas Carol"	Gabrielle Beaumont	Jeffrey Lewis	April 22, 1988
10	"Ad Astra Per Peoria"	Barnet Kellman	Jim Macak	Unaired
11	"A Falcone in the Hand"	Beaumont	Christian Williams	Unaired
12	"Cannon-Aid"	Patterson	Stanley Young	Unaired
13	"Terry and the Pirates"	Patterson	John Romano	Unaired
