= Michael Wagner (writer) =

American screenwriter

Michael Bill Wagner
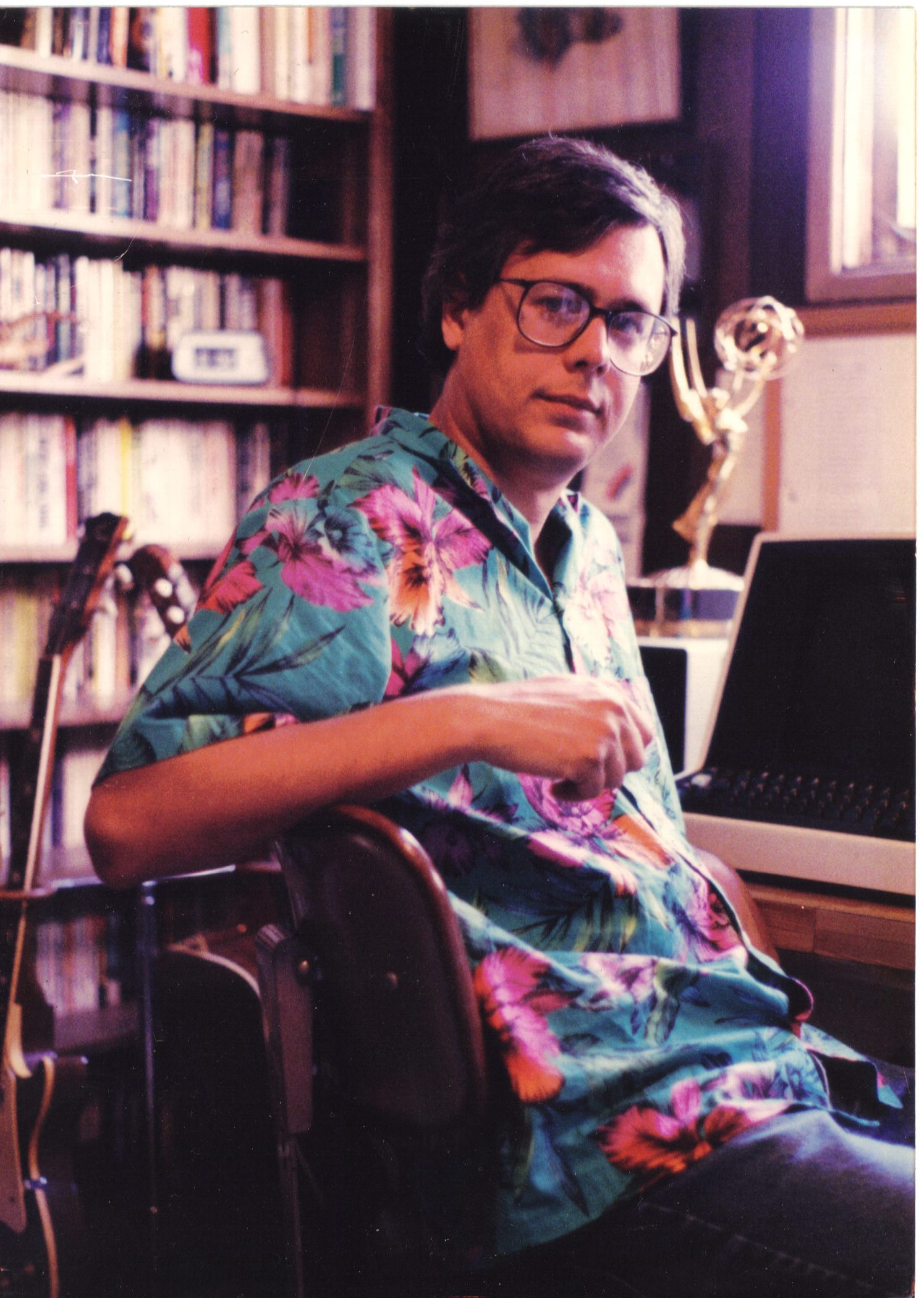
- Born: September 30, 1947; Ohio, U.S.
- Died: April 23, 1992 (aged 44); Agoura Hills, California, U.S.
- Occupations: Television writer and producer
- Years active: 1975–1992

Michael Bill Wagner (September 30, 1947 – April 23, 1992) was an American television writer and producer who worked on several television shows between 1975 and 1992, and won an Emmy Award in 1982 for Outstanding Writing in a Drama Series for his work on the television show Hill Street Blues. He co-created, produced and wrote several episodes for the one-season ABC series Probe.

== Career ==
Wagner was a military brat. He was born in Ohio, but grew up on Air Force bases in New York, Illinois, Japan, Germany, Nebraska and Texas. He graduated in 1965 from Randolph High School at Randolph Air Force Base, Texas. He attended the University of Missouri and moved to California, holding various jobs in Los Angeles, while writing scripts and selling some of his paintings.

In 1975 he sold his first television script to CBS for the series The Blue Knight, a crime drama based on the Joseph Wambaugh novel of the same name. He quickly became an established television writer, scripting episodes of Jigsaw John, The Six Million Dollar Man, Kojak, Man from Atlantis, Starsky & Hutch and The Rockford Files, among others.

In 1982 a script he wrote for the TV crime drama series Hill Street Blues, "The World According to Freedom," was aired and he was quickly hired as a regular staff writer for the series. His story introduced the character "Captain Freedom," a street vigilante dressed absurdly as a superhero. His follow-up episode, "Freedom's Last Stand," won him the 1982 Emmy Award as co-writer for Outstanding Writing in a Drama Series. In fact, three of the scripts he co-wrote for that season were nominated in the same category. Wagner went on to co-write 35 episodes of Hill Street Blues for the next two years, and began a long association with Steven Bochco and several of his projects.

Wagner was asked by ABC in 1987 to help develop a new science fiction series, Probe, a light-hearted series about a scientific crime fighter named Austin James. Isaac Asimov, the renowned science fiction writer, had created the basic idea of a young man who solved mysteries using scientific concepts, somewhat in the vein of Tom Swift or Rick Brant. Wagner wrote the two-hour pilot TV movie, "Computer Logic," and became Executive Producer for the series, which lasted one season. Parker Stevenson, who played the lead character, stated in a later interview that he patterned his character after Wagner's mannerisms and physical behavior. The series ran on Thursday nights in the Spring of 1988 during the same time slot as NBC's The Cosby Show, and with that competition could not attract a sufficient audience to get renewed for the following season.

The following TV season, Wagner wrote three scripts for the Gene Roddenberry series Star Trek: The Next Generation, and served briefly as Executive Producer for the series. He worked with Steven Bochco on Bochco's Hooperman, starring John Ritter. Wagner helped develop and write the Bochco animated series Capitol Critters, he also wrote and served as supervising producer for the NBC series Mann & Machine in 1992.

In 1992, Wagner died from brain cancer in Agoura Hills, California.
