= The Taking of Beverly Hills =

1991 film by Sidney J. Furie

- Domestic poster
- Directed by: Sidney J. Furie
- Screenplay by: Rick Natkin; David Fuller; David J. Burke
- Story by: Sidney J. Furie; Rick Natkin; David Fuller
- Produced by: Graham Henderson
- Starring: Ken Wahl; Matt Frewer; Harley Jane Kozak; Robert Davi
- Cinematography: Frank E. Johnson
- Edited by: Antony Gibbs
- Music by: Jan Hammer
- Production company: Nelson Entertainment
- Distributed by: Columbia Pictures
- Release date: October 11, 1991
- Running time: 95 minutes
- Country: United States
- Language: English
- Budget: $15 million–$25 million
- Box office: $939,277 (U.S.)

The Taking of Beverly Hills is a 1991 American action film directed by Sidney J. Furie and starring Ken Wahl, Matt Frewer, Harley Jane Kozak and Robert Davi. The story follows football star "Boomer" Hayes (Wahl), as he battles ex-cops using a chemical spill as a front to plunder Beverly Hills' riches, with the help of a remorseful officer (Frewer) who came close to siding with the bandits. A then little known Pamela Anderson makes a brief, uncredited appearance.

It was intended as an elevated comeback to theatrical work for Wahl, after his mainstream breakthrough on the TV series Wiseguy. However, the planned distributor, Orion Pictures, experienced financial troubles and it was only given a limited release by Columbia. It was a critical and commercial failure.

== Plot ==
One night in Beverly Hills, California, a truck carrying hazardous materials crashes, releasing a deadly chemical. The citizens of Beverly Hills are sent to quarantine in a hotel in Century City, while the police and the EPA agents stay behind to keep an eye on the valuables and clean up the town. In fact, the spill is a cleverly executed hoax masterminded by the head of L.A.'s football team, Robert "Bat" Masterson. The police officers and DEA agents are bitter ex-cops eager for a piece of what the citizens have hoarded from them. Within the 70 minutes that it will take for the National Guard to arrive, they plot to loot every home and business in the city.

However, one man has been forgotten in the rush to get everyone out. Aging football player David "Boomer" Hayes was in his hot tub, expecting to get lucky, when his lady friend, Laura Sage went to see what was going on and was taken in the rush to evacuate everyone. The officers thought that "Boomer" was her dog, but checked anyway. After taking care of one of the cops sent to kill him, Boomer is trapped in the hot tub by an officer, but before he can shoot him, he's shot from behind.

Ed Kelvin, a cop in on the whole thing but disgusted by the ruthless murder of the Mayor (he was told there would be no killing), fills in Boomer on the whole situation, and Boomer decides to help bring in the real police, who are locked in the station's hazmat suit room. Donning his jersey, injecting cortizone for his bum knee, and enlisting Kelvin's help, Boomer will spend the next 70 minutes attempting to stop the robbery and bring Masterson to justice, while evading ex-cops and the hired thug Benitez, who has commandeered a SWAT tank and is gunning for Boomer and Kelvin.

== Cast ==
- Ken Wahl as David "Boomer" Hayes
- Matt Frewer as Officer Ed Kelvin
- Harley Jane Kozak as Laura Sage
- Robert Davi as Robert "Bat" Masterson
- Lee Ving as Varney
- Branscombe Richmond as Benitez
- Lyman Ward as Chief Healy
- George Wyner as the Mayor of Beverly Hills
- William Prince as Mitchell Sage
- Michael Bowen as Cop at Roadblock
- Michael G. Kehoe as Stafford
- Mark Haining as Garris
- Jason Blicker as Damon
- Tony Ganios as EPA Agent
- Ken Swofford as Coach
- Michael Alldredge as Dispatch Sergeant
- Raymond Singer as Mr. Tobeason
- Bob Golic as himself
- Pete Koch as himself
- Pamela Anderson as Cheerleader (uncredited)

== Production ==
=== Development and casting ===
The initial premise came from director Sidney J. Furie. He took it to David Fuller, writer of his films The Boys in Company C and Purple Hearts, who teamed up with longtime friend Rick Natkin. Furie sent the completed script to Purple Hearts star Ken Wahl midway into the second season of his TV series Wiseguy. In summer 1989, reports surfaced that Arnold Schwarzenegger was in talks to star, but Wahl was confirmed to have signed on in the fall and Furie reiterated that the lead had always been intended for the latter. Wahl had originally turned it down as he did not like the hero's first incarnation, a stereotypical, bitter cop on leave from the force. He eventually asked his Wiseguy showrunner David J. Burke to punch up the screenplay, ushering in the flamboyant "Boomer," a football player inspired by Joe Namath. Wahl explained, "After three years on Wiseguy, I wanted something polar-opposite. I didn't want to do anything deep, dark or serious. [...] The movie has no redeeming social value, and it's not supposed to be taken seriously." Furie was dissatisfied with the rewrites.

Wahl was paid $750,000 for the role, the first in a planned three-picture deal with Nelson Entertainment, a British-owned upstart that was easing into a lead producer role, following their success with more minor investments, like Bill and Ted's Excellent Adventure. Wahl's good friend Tony Ganios soon joined the cast, tentatively as a villain named Megadeath, although rewrites were still ongoing and he had to settle for another role. While Robert Davi had played a recurring character on Wiseguy and gotten along well with Wahl, he was cast as antagonist "Bat" Masterson by Furie, based on his similar role in Licence to Kill. Los Angeles Raiders defensive tackle Bob Golic has a cameo in the film as a football player, as does former Raider Pete Koch. Pamela Anderson makes an uncredited background appearance as a cheerleader. The casting department in Mexico, where most of the film was actually shot, had to find about 1,500 extras that could pass as Beverly Hills residents for the film, at a rate of $55 per day.

David Giler was announced as the film's producer, but he is not credited in the final picture. The eventual producer, Graham Henderson, was the vice-president in charge of production at Nelson. Although uncredited in either capacity, Wahl was identified as co-producer in some sources, an as executive producer in others. The star brought much of his Wiseguy crew onto the film, to which Nelson Entertainment was reluctant due to the higher demands of theatrical work. According to contemporary sources, when Nelson executives visited Wahl on the series' set, he walked them into a room full of people and told them they were hired, effectively forcing his partners' hand. Among those who graduated from the series was cinematographer Frank E. Johnson. British production designer Peter Lamont, a veteran of the James Bond franchise and Furie's The Ipcress File, was brought in by the director, initially for a few weeks. He ended up staying in Los Angeles for fifteen months, performing double duty on another Nelson production, Eve of Destruction. His son Neil served as art director.

=== Set building ===
From the onset, it was clear that the city of Beverly Hills could not, and would not, accommodate such a venture. Peter Lamont spent three months mapping out the real Rodeo Drive in pictures, which attracted the suspicion of some jewelry stores. The area was then recreated on the grounds of the Ciudad deportiva (lit. 'Sports City'), an unfinished sports complex just south of Mexico City. Building started in December 1989. Lamont brought his core staff from Britain, who were supplemented by 300 local workers. They were each paid a little more than $200 per week, which could amount to nearly 60 hours of labor. The 22-acre site required 4,000 m^{3} (140,000 ft^{3}) of concrete, although three blocks of shops had to be condensed into two for budgetary reasons. Six standalone houses were also built. As the set was not erected on a conventional studio backlot, it required an ad hoc electrical infrastructure. Yet, the Mexican outsourcing made the large construction possible for a mere $1.8 million.

=== Filming and post-production ===
Principal photography took place between April 2 and July 6, 1990, during the third Wiseguy offseason, as it was not yet known that Wahl would leave the show. Nelson used a subsidiary called Elm Productions for the shoot. Wahl's number 12 jersey was a nod to Joe Namath. For Kozak, costume designer Betsy Cox chose a cocktail dress by Jean Paul Gaultier. Frewer, who was hired for comic relief, was asked to give one take straight from the script, before he was allowed to ad-lib on subsequent ones.

The stunt coordinator was Jack Gill, who doubled as pilot for the Alvis Saracen armored car. His younger brother and trainee, Andy Gill, also worked on the film and performed his first cannon roll for the occasion. The tanker truck crash was shot on the very first night. The crowd scenes, which included 400 or 500 extras at a time, were scheduled over four nights. The Saracen scenes took two weeks to shoot. They required the addition of a mock cannon turret, which is absent from the real type. Another six weeks were spent in the residential block, while the climactic Rodeo Drive shootout was captured over three weeks. The rest of Mexican filming, which focused on interiors, took place in Mexico City proper, on location and at Estudios Churubusco. Just before the production left at the end of June, an armored car transporting the equivalent of $50,000 earmarked for the local crew's salaries was robbed. Filming concluded with one week in metro Los Angeles to get some authentic exteriors.

The film was cut by veteran English editor Antony Gibbs, who had not collaborated with Furie since his early British efforts in the 1960s. The Canadian helmer described their reunion as his only solace on a project that was a struggle at every step, up to post-production and beyond. Budget estimates have varied significantly, from $15 million to $19 million, $21 million or even $25 million.

== Release ==
=== Pre-release ===
Wahl was upfront about his commercial aspirations for the film, saying, "Hopefully it will gross 100 million. That's the plan." Nelson had two separate output deals, one with Columbia Pictures and another with Orion Pictures. At the time of filming, Nelson indicated that the film's domestic rights might get picked up by Columbia. That did not happen, and they went to Orion, with a release date around February 1991. However, the cash-strapped distributor settled on a May 10 date. By May, an August release appeared more likely. Eventually, Orion negotiated with Columbia to take over the film anyway. Its fifteen month limbo further damaged the finances of free-spending Nelson Entertainment, which was subjected to a 15 percent interest rate on its budget.

The filmmakers did not seek authorization to build and destroy replicas of luxury stores such as Van Cleef & Arpels, Fred, Cartier and Armani. Representatives for some of these properties reacted negatively, but legal experts discouraged lawsuits, as the destruction did not cast negative aspersions about the brands themselves, and no action was taken.

=== Theatrical ===
Columbia gave the film a limited, 541-screen domestic release across 20 markets including Los Angeles and New York on October 11, 1991. It was box office bomb, grossing only $525,936 for the weekend, one of the worst openings of the year. It averaged a paltry $1,195 per screen in its first week. Its final North American tally was just $939,277, and it was estimated to be $24 million in the red towards the end of its theatrical run.

=== Home media ===
The film arrived on VHS on April 22, 1992, though New Line Home Video, who had taken over most of Nelson's U.S. operations, including video, as the company's lavish spending had caught up to it. It was not a particularly strong performer, spending just four weeks in the Billboard rentals charts and peaking at number 27. In the U.K., there is no trace of a theatrical release and the film landed on Guild Home Video tape on June 11, 1992.

The domestic DVD and Blu-ray arrived through Kino Lorber on January 18, 2018. The disc features a commentary from film historian Howard S. Berger and Furie biographer Daniel Kremer.

== Reception ==
On the review aggregator website Rotten Tomatoes, 40% of 5 critics' reviews are positive.

=== Contemporary ===
The Taking of Beverly Hills received overwhelmingly negative reviews upon release. Michael Wilmington of the Los Angeles Times assessed, "How can rational human beings dream up such an entertainment? Consider the amount of disbelief we have to suspend." He added that Furie, who "probably had some Die Hard fantasies when he started, doesn’t even get the sheer bawdy idiot fun of the unusual over-glamorous clinker; despite lots of forced humor, it’s played disconcertingly straight. Everything takes place on a dingy, murky evening and the Beverly Hills, or mock Beverly Hills, here, might as well have been re-created on a back lot in Wilmette." Roger Hurlburt of the South Florida Sun Sentinel agreed, exclaiming, "Brother. Talk about contrived stuff. You'll be expecting Superman to fly in at any moment." He concluded that "the only people taken in The Taking of Beverly Hills are those buying a ticket", as "very little of the real Beverly Hills is seen in this comic book action film". Steve Murray of The Atlanta Journal further commented, "Yes, the movie really is that stupid. It wants to be Die Hard. You'll wish it was Die Quick. Joe Kane, the New York Daily News' resident genre columnist, deemed that "Beverly Hills Die Hard would have been a more accurate moniker for this relentlessly imitative affair." Terry Kelleher of Newsday quipped that even part-time actor Joe Namath "has been in better movies than The Taking of Beverly Hills."

Matthew Gilbert of The Boston Globe was critical of the production values, finding that it "sounds like it's occurring in an underground tunnel", and that "[e]ven with its bright cop-car explosions and Playboy-Playgirl centerfold aesthetic, the entire movie seems similarly trapped in a dank, empty place." Desmond Ryan, liberal commentator and critic for the The Philadelphia Inquirer, remarked, "This slovenly and dimwitted thriller might titillate the denizens of Beverly Hills who are barricaded behind their electronically secure mansions, but it's hard for a movie of this stripe to have much of the intended impact when the rest of us are fervently cheering the bad guys." Conversely, Joe Baltake of The Sacramento Bee wrote, "Part of the fun of this movie is that it gives you a good excuse to root for the bad guys without feeling guilty." He added, "This isn't an action movie; it is spoof of an action movie and it would be a good spoof if it had someone other than Ken Wahl as its hero," as "he plays the dumb jock too convincingly." However, he found Frewer "suitably light" as his sidekick, while "Davi does a good impersonation of the character Alan Rickman portrayed in the original Die Hard."

Mark Caro of the Chicago Tribune found that the premise "isn't bad", but the whole film remained "as flat as a one-sentence summary", while Furie "displays nothing more than a talent for filming the least exciting explosions in cinematic history." Janet Maslin of The New York Times concurred, calling it a "silly action film" and noting that while "the plot is elaborate", it leads to "little more than violent episodes during which flying bullets, shooting flames and screeching tires are accompanied by pounding, upbeat music." She added that Wahl "makes it easy to understand why he can more often be seen on the small screen than on the large one." Barbara Shulgasser of the San Francisco Examiner also called out the film's "nonsensical" setup, as well as the dialogue's "artificial cadences" and Furie's "strictly routine" direction. Mike Clark of USA Today was mildly positive, writing, "Surpringly, the result is not-half-bad junky fun, though it's as slackly made as Gable and Lombard and the Iron Eagle adventures, merely two of several previous duds from director Sidney J. Furie. The Die Hard parallels make the new film intentions' laughably transparent, but Ken Wahl is easier to take than Bruce Willis."

=== Retrospective ===
Retrospective reviews have been marginally more favorable. Nicholas Bell of Ion Cinema remained in line with contemporary opinions, assessing that it "certainly isn’t an underrated jewel in Furie's later filmography. Unable to maintain the compelling strands of its B-movie narrative from jump, lovers of Die Hard knockoffs and early 1990s cinema may find this of interest, while those hoping for a portrait of Los Angeles from the period will also be disappointed", despite "an incredibly impressive soundtrack".

Brian Ordorff of Blu-ray.com gave a mixed verdict, writing, "The Taking of Beverly Hills is ultimately too one-note to compete in the subgenre, but it certainly has its heart (or fist) in the right place, with the production trying to generate as much mayhem as possible with the one-man-army premise." V.N. Pryor of Cinapse deemed that "this movie is dumb. But it’s dumb in a glorious, tongue in cheek, over the top way that’s endlessly entertaining." He praised "the goofy charm of Ken Wahl, who makes Hayes so endearingly dense and good natured that it’s easy to root for him, even though you know deep down that he represents the worst parts of sports hero worship and class conflict."

== Video game ==
Miami-based publisher Capstone Software, who had previously acquired the adaptation rights to Nelson's Bill and Ted's Excellent Adventure and many other movies, produced a tie-in game for MS-DOS. Off the Wall Productions, the developer in charge of both titles, was an offshoot of Delaware-based Creative Computers. The adventure game, which let you play as "Boomer" and—briefly—Laura in their attempt to stop the looting of the city, mixed classic inventory puzzles with top down exploration. It was originally announced for October 1991 to coincide with the theatrical release, but contemporary press suggests that it was delayed to the home video's release window, and included a coupon for a free rental of the movie. In the U.K., the game was distributed by Accolade. Like the film, it failed to make an impact.

== Soundtrack ==
In addition to an original score by Jan Hammer, the film features a number of licensed hit songs, including "Feels Good" by Tony! Toni! Toné!, "Let's Get It On" by Marvin Gaye, "Unbelievable" by EMF, "Black Cat" by Janet Jackson, "For The Love Of Money" by The O'Jays, "Epic" by Faith No More, Ghost Box by Black Box and "What Comes Naturally" by Sheena Easton.
