= Michael Bendetti =

American actor (born 1967)

- Born: Michael Christian Bendetti; August 21, 1967 (age 59); Long Beach, California, U.S.
- Education: Neighborhood Playhouse School of the Theatre
- Occupations: Actor; producer
- Years active: 1988–2003

Michael Christian Bendetti (born August 21, 1967) is an American former actor and film producer who was active on film from 1980s to 1990s.

== Biography ==
Michael Christian Bendetti was born on August 21, 1967, in Long Beach, California. He studied at the Neighborhood Playhouse School of the Theatre, in New York City.

Bendetti's first feature film was in the comedy film Screwball Hotel (1988). Also in that year, he appeared in the television film Lady Mobster (1988).

Bendetti worked as a production assistant in the action film The Taking of Beverly Hills (1991), and later starred in the horror film Netherworld (1992).

He appeared as Officer Anthony "Mac" McCann in 21 Jump Street (1990-1991). Bendetti's role in 21 Jump Street was the most successful of his acting career.

He appeared in television series Baywatch, Doogie Howser, M.D., My Two Dads, Red Shoe Diaries (which also his last notable production), The Monroes, and in the television films The Great Los Angeles Earthquake and Amanda and the Alien.

Bendetti put his acting on hold for around five years and decided to end his active career as an actor and film producer. The period between 1995 and 2003 was only interrupted by Bendetti's involvement in the comedy film Between the Sheets (2003), which he worked as a producer alongside Michael DeLuise, with whom he had worked several times before and Scott Stephens.

Bendetti currently lives in Los Angeles and nearby Santa Monica.

== Filmography ==
=== Film ===
| Year | Title | Role | Notes |
|---|---|---|---|
| 1988 | Screwball Hotel | Mike | |
| 1991 | The Taking of Beverly Hills | — | Production assistant |
| 1992 | Netherworld | Corey Thornton | |
| 2003 | Between the Sheets | — | Producer |
| 2005 | The Possessed | Corey Thornton | Archive footage |
| 2026 | Zombie Bloodlines | Mike | Archive footage |

=== Television ===
| Year | Title | Role | Notes |
|---|---|---|---|
| 1988 | Lady Mobster | Young Nick | TV movie |
| 1989 | My Two Dads | Kevin O'Neill | 1 episode |
| 1990 | Doogie Howser, M.D. | Michael Leonetti | 1 episode |
| 1990 | The Great Los Angeles Earthquake | Tim Bradley | TV movie |
| 1990–1991 | 21 Jump Street | Officer Anthony "Mac" McCann | 22 episodes |
| 1990–1991 | Into The Night | Himself (guest) | 2 episodes |
| 1991 | The Joan Rivers Show | Himself (guest) | 1 episode |
| 1992 | Baywatch | Ian | 1 episode |
| 1994 | Red Shoe Diaries | Michael Sims | 1 episode |
| 1995 | Amanda and the Alien | Charlie Nobles | TV movie |
| 1995 | The Monroes | Hunter | 2 episodes |
