= Arlaine Wright =

Canadian exercise instructor

Arlaine Wright (born in Hamilton, Ontario) is the former exercise instructor featured prominently on the Canadian produced aerobics show, The :20 Minute Workout. Wright, Bess Motta, Anne Schumacher and Leslie Smith were the only four women who appeared on both seasons of the :20 Minute Workout.

Wright took ballet lessons from the age of three until the age of fifteen., and danced full-time with a dance troupe at the Delawana Inn. She had also been in the cheerleading squads for the Toronto Argonauts, and Hamilton Tigercats. It was while teaching aerobics at a Toronto aerobics studio, that she got the part on the :20 Minute Workout.

Following two seasons of being an exercise instructor on the :20 Minute Workout, Wright worked for several years at Reebok Canada in the Toronto area where she headed up the company's "Aerobic Instructors' Program"

In 1998, Wright and Motta were seen in the comedy movie Dirty Work, in which they appeared in archival footage from the :20 Minute Workout.
