= Netherworld (film) =

- Video release poster
- Directed by: David Schmoeller
- Screenplay by: David Schmoeller
- Story by: Charles Band
- Produced by: Charles Band; Thomas Bradford
- Starring: Michael Bendetti; Denise Gentile; Holly Floria; Robert Sampson; Holly Butler; Alex Datcher
- Cinematography: Adolfo Bartoli
- Edited by: Andy Horvitch
- Music by: David Bryan
- Distributed by: Full Moon Features
- Release date: February 6, 1992
- Running time: 85 minutes
- Country: United States
- Languages: English; French

Netherworld is a 1992 American horror film written and directed by David Schmoeller and produced by Charles Band. The film, distributed by Full Moon Features, received mixed reviews from critics.

== Plot ==
After his father dies, Corey Thorton inherits his father's estate in Louisiana, only to find that his father plans to sacrifice his soul to live again.

== Cast ==
- Michael Bendetti as Corey Thorton
- Denise Gentile as Delores
- Holly Floria as Diane Palmer
- Robert Sampson as Noah Thorton
- Holly Butler as Marilyn Monroe
- Alex Datcher as Mary Magdalene
- Robert Burr as Beauregard Yates, Esq.
- George Kelly as Bijou
- Mark Kemble as Barbusoir
- Michael Lowry as Stemsy
- David Schmoeller as Billy "Billy C"

== Production and soundtrack ==
The film was originally to be produced in Romania, but Band moved it to New Orleans, Louisiana. The film's soundtrack is handled by keyboardist David Bryan.

== Reception ==
Netherworld received mixed-to-negative reviews from critics. Writing in The Zombie Movie Encyclopedia, academic Peter Dendle called it "an unremarkable Dixieland shocker from dubious Full Moon Studios". Doug Brod of Entertainment Weekly criticized the film's slow pacing, lead character, and rushed, 'unsatisfying' ending. A slightly negative review by Matt Brunson on The Film Frenzy praises the film's chaos while criticizing the plotline's focus. In a more favorable review, Lawrence Cohn of Variety called it an "entertaining horror pic".

=== Awards ===
Netherworld was nominated for the 1993 Saturn Award for Best Genre Video Release.
