= William Prince (actor) =

American actor (1913–1996)

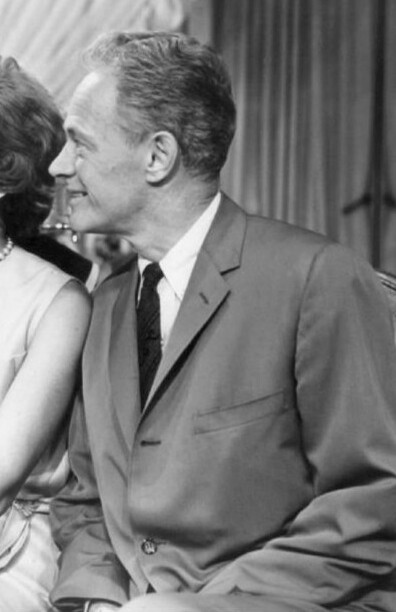
- Prince in Young Doctor Malone, 1962
- Born: William Leroy Prince; January 26, 1913; Nichols, New York, U.S.
- Died: October 8, 1996 (aged 83); Tarrytown, New York, U.S.
- Occupation: Actor
- Years active: 1936–1994
- Spouses: Dorothy Hause (m. 1934; div. 1964) Augusta Dabney (m. 1964–1996)
- Children: 4

William Leroy Prince (January 26, 1913 – October 8, 1996) was an American actor who appeared in numerous soap operas and made dozens of guest appearances on primetime series as well as playing villains in movies like The Gauntlet, The Cat from Outer Space and Spontaneous Combustion.

== Early life ==
Prince was born in Nichols, New York, on January 26, 1913. He graduated from Central High School in Binghamton, New York.

When Prince was a senior at Cornell University, he left to act in The Taming of the Shrew as part of a Federal Theatre tour. He gained additional experience with the Barter Theater in Abingdon, Virginia, including a trip to New York for a 1937 production. He also performed in Shakespeare's plays in a company headed by Maurice Evans.

== Career ==
Early in Prince's career, he supplemented his limited income from acting in summer stock productions in Pennsylvania by photographing children professionally. Off-season from summer stock he was an announcer at WQXR radio in New York City.

In 1936 Prince acted with the Barter Theatre in Abingdon, Virginia.

Prince portrayed Richard in Ah, Wilderness! In 1942, he played Private Quizz West in The Eve of St. Mark. His Broadway debut came in The Eternal Road. After signing a film contract, he acted in Destination Tokyo, Objective Burma, and Dead Reckoning.

Prince worked primarily in television in the 1950s, having moved back to New York. In 1947, he became one of the founding members of The Actors Studio. Over the next decade, he made numerous appearances on anthology drama series such as Studio One, The Philco Television Playhouse, and Armstrong Circle Theatre, and in 1955, Prince co-starred with Gary Merrill in the second season of Justice, an NBC drama about lawyers of the Legal Aid Society of New York.

Prince had roles on several soap operas, including the starring role on Young Dr. Malone from 1958 to 1963, Another World, As the World Turns, The Edge of Night, Search for Tomorrow and A World Apart, often appearing with his actress wife Augusta Dabney. Two of his film roles were as Christian de Neuvillette in the classic 1950 Cyrano de Bergerac starring José Ferrer, and as Edward Ruddy, president of the fictional UBS network in Paddy Chayefsky's 1976 film, Network. He also portrayed patriarch Ambassador Joseph P. Kennedy in the 1977 teleplay Johnny, We Hardly knew Ye. Other films Prince appeared in include Alfred Hitchcock's Family Plot (1976), The Gauntlet (1977) with Clint Eastwood, Spies Like Us (1985) with Chevy Chase and Dan Aykroyd and The Paper (1994).

Returning to Broadway, Prince had leading roles in John Loves Mary and Forward the Heart. He appeared as Orlando in As You Like It, with Katharine Hepburn, and as Christopher Isherwood in I Am a Camera. In 1963, he played Charles Marsden in the Actors Studio production of Strange Interlude. He took leading roles in several plays by Edward Albee, beginning with The Ballad of the Sad Cafe in 1963. He understudied "Charlie" in the Broadway production of Seascape (1975), co-starred in the Hartford Stage Company's 1976 revival of All Over, appeared opposite Angela Lansbury in Counting the Ways and Listening in 1977, and played the title role in the short-lived The Man Who Had Three Arms in 1983.

During the 1970s, 1980s and into the early 1990s, Prince made guest appearances on dozens of primetime television series and miniseries including Cannon, Hawaii Five-O, Kojak, The Rockford Files, Quincy, M.E., Matlock and Murder, She Wrote. He also reunited with Cyrano star José Ferrer for the made-for-television films The Rhinemann Exchange (1977) and Gideon's Trumpet (1980). In the latter, Ferrer played attorney for petitioner Gideon, Abe Fortas, and Prince was seen as one of the Supreme Court Justices. In 1992, he appeared on the long-running NBC drama Law & Order in the episode "The Working Stiff", playing a corrupt former governor and friend of District Attorney Adam Schiff involved in a banking scandal.

== Personal life and death ==
William Prince died October 8, 1996, at Phelps Memorial Hospital in Tarrytown, New York. He was 83, and lived in Dobbs Ferry, New York, at the time of his death.

== Selected filmography ==
- The Moon Is Down (1943) – Bit Part (uncredited)
- Destination Tokyo (1943) – Pills
- The Very Thought of You (1944) – Fred
- Hollywood Canteen (1944) – William Prince
- Objective, Burma! (1945) – Lieutenant Sid Jacobs
- Pillow to Post (1945) – Lieutenant Don Mallory
- Cinderella Jones (1946) – Bart Williams
- Shadow of a Woman (1946) – David G. MacKellar
- Dead Reckoning (1947) – Sergeant Johnny Drake
- Carnegie Hall (1947) – Tony Salerno Jr.
- Lust for Gold (1949) – Barry Storm
- Cyrano de Bergerac (1950) – Christian De Neuvillette
- Secret of Treasure Mountain (1956) – Robert Kendall
- The Vagabond King (1956) – Rene De Montigny
- Macabre (1958) – Dr. Rodney Barrett
- Sacco e Vanzetti (1971) – William Thompson
- The Heartbreak Kid (1972) – Colorado Man
- Blade (1973) – Powers
- The Stepford Wives (1975) – Ike Mazzard
- Family Plot (1976) – Bishop Wood
- Network (1976) – Edward George Ruddy
- Fire Sale (1977) – Mr. Cooper
- Rollercoaster (1977) – Quinlan
- The Gauntlet (1977) – Commissioner Edgar A. Blakelock
- The Cat from Outer Space (1978) – Mr. Olympus
- The Promise (1979) – George Calloway
- Bronco Billy (1980) – Edgar Lipton
- Love and Money (1982) – Paultz
- The Soldier (1982) – The President
- Kiss Me Goodbye (1982) – Reverend Hollis
- The Sting II (1983) – Tuxedo (uncredited)
- Movers & Shakers (1985) – Louis Martin
- Fever Pitch (1985) – Mitchell
- Spies Like Us (1985) – Mr. Keyes
- Assassination (1987) – H.H. Royce
- Nuts (1987) – Clarence Middleton
- Vice Versa (1988) – Avery
- Shakedown (1988) – Mr. Feinberger
- Second Sight (1989) – Cardinal O'Hara
- B.L. Stryker: Blind Chess (1989) – Judge Horace R. Ferrano
- Spontaneous Combustion (1990) – Lew Orlander
- Steel and Lace (1991) – Old Man
- The Taking of Beverly Hills (1991) – Mitchell Sage
- The Paper (1994) – Howard Hackett

== See also ==
- List of actors who have played the President of the United States of America
