= Ken Wahl =

American actor (born 1957)

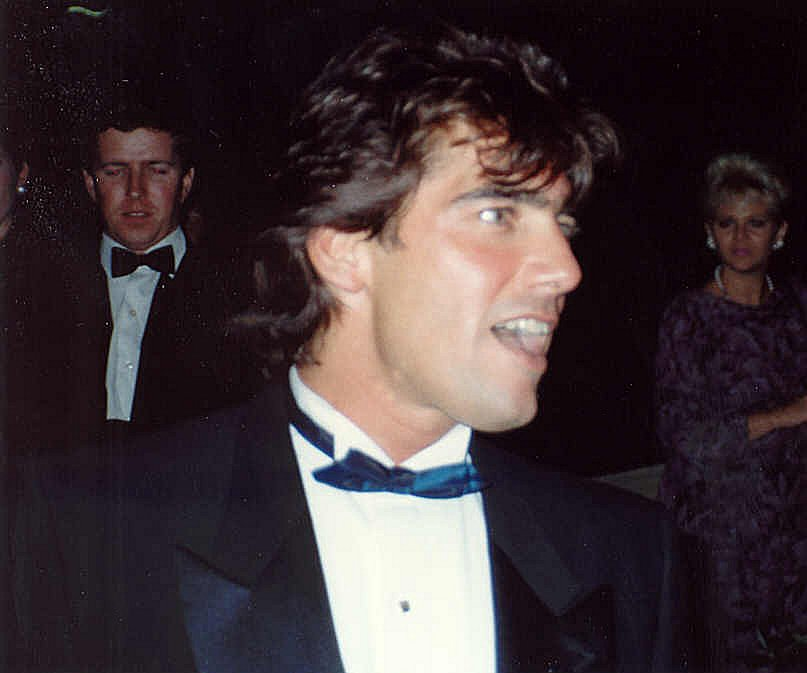
- Wahl at the 41st Emmy Awards
- Born: February 14, 1957 (age 69); Chicago, Illinois, U.S.
- Education: Bremen High School
- Occupation: Actor
- Years active: 1979–1996
- Spouses: Corinne Alphen (m. 1983; div. 1991) Shane Barbi (m. 1997)
- Children: 1
- Awards: See below

Ken Wahl (born February 14, 1957) is an American retired actor. He is best known for his starring role as undercover FBI agent Vinnie Terranova on the television series Wiseguy (1987–90), for which he won a Golden Globe Award for Best Actor – Television Series Drama.

== Early life ==
Wahl is elusive about his personal life, and has given more than one birthdate. A syndicated article in 1988, citing records checked by the CBS publicist for Wahl's television series Wiseguy, gives February 14, 1957, a date that corresponds with the year of his high school graduation: "A call to Bremen High School in the Chicago suburb of Midlothian reveals Wahl graduated from there in June 1975, presumably at age 18." In 2004, Entertainment Weekly noted the confusion surrounding Wahl's date of birth and added that "Ken Wahl is not actually Ken Wahl. At least he wasn't when he was born. While he declines to disclose his birth name, he does say that the moniker he's gone by for the past 25 years is the name of the person who saved his father's life in the Korean War".

According to Wahl, he was born "in a tiny apartment on the south side of Chicago, in the late Fifties". The 1988 NEA article states that Wahl was the ninth of 11 children from a blue-collar German/Italian family and "attended different high schools as the family moved to the [Chicago] suburbs of Midlothian and Worth, Illinois." According to Entertainment Weekly, Wahl played baseball in unspecified venues that might have included youth leagues and high school teams, before crashing a motorcycle and hurting his knee at age 16.

== Career ==
=== Acting ===
After moving to Los Angeles, he worked as an extra on movies, including The Buddy Holly Story (1978). Wahl first gained recognition in 1979 when he was cast in the leading role of director Philip Kaufman's film The Wanderers (1979). He was cast in Fort Apache, The Bronx (1981) and played the lead in movies, including Race for the Yankee Zephyr (1981), The Soldier (1982), Jinxed! (1982), and Purple Hearts (1984). In 1984, he suffered another motorcycle crash while on his way to meet with Diane Keaton about the role that eventually went to Mel Gibson in the film Mrs. Soffel. Not wearing a helmet, Wahl needed 89 stitches in his scalp.

After appearing in the TV movie The Dirty Dozen: Next Mission (1985) and co-starring in the six-episode TV series Double Dare, Wahl was cast in the lead role of Vinnie Terranova in the television series Wiseguy in 1987. The following year, Wahl said "The feature market dried up for me. When 'Wiseguy' came along I was hesitant to do it, but I thought the quality was good. I had to make a living, so I decided to do it. I didn't have to audition or anything." The show ran until 1990 and brought Wahl a Golden Globe Award and an Emmy Award nomination. Wahl wrote an episode of Wiseguy in 1989 and directed an episode in 1990.

During the second season, he injured himself on an episode directed by Jan Eliasberg. In 2024, Wahl said "She had me walking into my own POV shot, and...I was stepping up, and the [camera] wheel caught my right heel and it just ripped out the Achilles tendon...But she wanted to do it again, so I said 'Okay, you're the boss.'" Series creator Steven J. Cannell said the camera ran over Wahl a second time, leaving him in such pain Cannell replaced him for three episodes while Wahl healed.

Wahl starred in The Taking of Beverly Hills (1991) and The Favor (1994) as well as a Wiseguy reunion in 1996.

Wahl retired from acting in 1996.

== Personal life and injury ==
By 1981, Wahl's father had remarried. Between acting jobs, Wahl stayed in Chicago with his father and stepmother or with his sister.

Wahl's acting career was derailed by a broken neck. He initially said that in 1992 he had endured another motorcycle crash, but later said he had fallen down a flight of stairs at the home of comedian Rodney Dangerfield's girlfriend and eventual wife Joan Child. "We were dating casually...I stayed over at her house one night, fell down these stairs, and she begged me not to say that in the press", Wahl said in 2004.

As his official biography describes the incident:

[In] August of 1992...Ken accidentally fell down some slippery marble stairs at a friend's home, causing his neck to break and his spinal column to be injured. Because his friend was in the public eye, she asked Ken not to say where the accident occurred. So, later on, when the media inquired about the scar on his neck, Ken simply offered the explanation that he had broken his neck in a motorcycle accident in a sincere effort to protect the privacy of his friend.

Blaming a "botched" undisclosed surgery and the refusal of doctors to prescribe pain medication, Wahl said in an interview that he told himself "Okay, I can't get a prescription, so I'll get a bottle of vodka. I was in such chronic, agonizing pain 24 hours a day that I started drinking to kill the pain." After gaining weight through lack of exercise, and with a growing alcohol problem, he worked 16 days on the Wiseguy reunion movie "and barely got through it. That's when I knew I couldn't do it anymore."

=== Relationships ===
Wahl married his first wife, former Penthouse Pet of the Year Corinne Alphen, in 1983. With Alphen, he had a son, and a step-son from Alphen's previous marriage. They divorced in 1991.

Traci Lords revealed in her autobiography Traci Lords: Underneath It All that she had a brief affair with Wahl in 1988 after she had a guest appearance on his TV series. Lords said of Wahl that he "was tall, dark, and brooding with a mischievous smile. He took me to dinner that night at a down-home Italian joint near my hotel. It had a low-key vibe and sensational food. He was a star with simple tastes, which impressed me. He was kind to people and bantered easily with the staff as he leaned back in his chair… He was one sexy man." She further added that he "was the first civilian I'd made love to post-porn" and that he made her think differently about relationships.

In 1995, Wahl was charged with disturbing the peace and arrested on an outstanding warrant for a drunken-driving charge, eventually pleaded no contest to both charges and receiving probation. A year later, he was arrested for allegedly threatening a bartender with a hunting knife for refusing to serve him alcohol. He pleaded no contest again and was ordered to enter a live-in alcohol rehabilitation program.

Wahl married Shane Barbi, his second wife, in 1997. Wahl says he and Barbi married after attending twelve-step meetings together.

=== Legal issue ===
In 2009, Wahl sued Henry Levine, his former business manager, alleging that Levine conspired with Wahl's first wife Corinne Alphen to defraud him.

== Activism ==
When his career declined because of injury, Wahl and his wife Shane turned their attention to supporting animal rights and disabled United States military veterans.

On 19 January 2010, he offered his Golden Globe Award as part of a reward then being assembled by the Second Chance Rescue Center in Sioux Falls, South Dakota to help find and convict the person who glued a 7-month-old orange tabby to Minnesota State Highway 60, where travelers found it on 18 December 2009; the cat, which rescuers called Timothy, died days later.

In 2012, Wahl stood against the Hayden Law Repeal, which would have revoked the Hayden Law for shelter pets in California, which had extended the number of days owners had to find their lost pets or for injured animals to receive donations or to be adopted.

For Memorial Day 2012, Wahl sent a message saluting the military, alongside the group Pets for Patriots, supporting adoption of pets for veterans. Later that year, he took part in the documentary Saving America's Horses, about both wild and domestic horses and the issues that plague them. In December 2012, he reiterated the need to support wounded veterans, and help reduce suicide rates, by pairing rescued animals with veterans.

== Filmography ==
=== Film ===
Year	Title	Role	Notes
1979	The Wanderers	Richie	
1980	Running Scared	Chas McClain	
1981	Fort Apache, The Bronx	Corelli	
1981	Race for the Yankee Zephyr	Barney Whitaker	
1982	The Soldier	The Soldier	
1982	Jinxed!	Willie Brodax	
1984	Purple Hearts	Don Jardian	
1987	Omega Syndrome	Jack Corbett	
1990	Book of Love	Angelo's friend	Cameo appearance
1991	The Taking of Beverly Hills	Boomer Hayes	
1994	The Favor	Tom Andrews	Filmed in 1990

=== Television ===
Year	Title	Role	Notes
1985	The Dirty Dozen: Next Mission	Louis Valentine	TV movie
1985	Double Dare	Ken Sisko	Main cast
1986	The Gladiator	Rick Benton	TV movie
1987–90	Wiseguy	Vinnie Terranova	Main cast; Seasons 1-3
1994	Search for Grace	John "Johnny" Danielli/Jake	TV movie
1996	Wiseguy	Vinnie Terranova	TV movie

== Awards and nominations ==
Institution	Year	Category	Work	Result	Ref.
Golden Globe Awards	1989	Best Actor – Television Series Drama	Wiseguy	Nominated	
Golden Globe Awards	1990	Best Actor – Television Series Drama	Wiseguy	Won	
Primetime Emmy Awards	1989	Outstanding Lead Actor in a Drama Series	Wiseguy	Nominated	
