= Dream Street (American TV series) =

- Genre: Drama
- Created by: Mark Rosner
- Starring: Dale Midkiff; Cecil Hoffman; Thomas Calabro; Debra Mooney
- Composer: William Olvis
- Country of origin: United States
- Original language: English
- No. of seasons: 1
- No. of episodes: 6

Production
- Executive producers: Robert Lieberman; Edward Zwick; Marshall Herskovitz
- Producer: Brooke Kennedy
- Camera setup: Single-camera
- Running time: 60 minutes
- Production companies: The Bedford Falls Company; MGM/UA Television

Original release
- Network: NBC
- Release: April 13 – June 7, 1989

Dream Street is an American drama television series created by Mark Rosner that aired on NBC from April 13, 1989, to June 7, 1989. The series was filmed on location in Hoboken, New Jersey, and was executive produced by Thirtysomething creators Edward Zwick and Marshall Herskovitz.

== Synopsis ==
Dream Street focused on a group of blue collar twenty-somethings who live and love in Hoboken, New Jersey. The series focuses on the DeBeau family who run a family business of refrigeration maintenance. They make up of the patriarch Pete, his wife Lillian, and their three adult sons all of whom work in the family business. Eldest son Harry is an irresponsible divorcee and womanizer who struggles to hide his gambling addiction; middle son Denis is the most mature and reliable, but is more of a dreamer than a realist; youngest son Eric is a wild and crazy teenager and high school dropout. In the pilot episode when Pete suffers a stroke, he gives Denis full control over the family business while he recovers, which draws tension between Denis and Harry who wants to run the business for himself.

Denis' best friend is Joey Coltrera, the son of local Mafia underboss Anthony Coltrera. However, Joey finds his friendship with Denis tested when he is assigned to be a collector to collect "protection money" from the DeBeau family. Joni Goldstein is Joey's fiancee whom comes from a traditional Jewish family and who do not approve of her engagement with Joey, and more so when they learn of his Mafia connections.

Other characters include Reuben Fundora, an employee and mutual friend of Denis whom is an ex-convict trying to go straight. Marianne McKinney is an elementary school teacher and a divorced single mother whom Denis becomes smitten with and begins to date despite her uncertainty with him and his background. Caesar Clemons is a Mafia associate and friend of Joey's. Kara is Joni's roommate who works as a dominatrix-for-hire.

== Cast ==
- Dale Midkiff as Denis DeBeau
- Peter Frechette as Harry DeBeau
- David Barry Gray as Eric DeBeau
- Tom Signorelli as Pete DeBeau
- Thomas Calabro as Joey Coltrera
- Cecil Hoffman as Joni Goldstein
- Jo Anderson as Marianne McKinney
- Victor Argo as Anthoney Coltrera
- Debra Mooney as Lillian DeBeau
- Paul Calderon as Reuben Fundora
- Charles Brown as Caesar Clemons
- Christine Moore as Kara

== Episodes ==
No.	Title	Directed by	Written by	Original release date	U.S. viewers (millions)	Rating/share (households)
1	"Pilot"	Mark Rosner	Mark Rosner	April 13, 1989	17.4	12.9/22
2	"True Love"	Unknown	Mark Rosner	April 21, 1989	7.3	5.7/11
3	"Money for Nothing"	Unknown	Story by : Mark Rosner; Teleplay by : Mark Rosner and Anthony Drazan	April 28, 1989	10.3	7.3/14
4	"Girl's Talk"	Unknown	Jeremy Iacone	May 5, 1989	9.4	6.6/12
5	"Father of the Year"	Unknown	Rose Schacht & Ann Powell	May 19, 1989	6.9	4.9/9
6	"Bachelor Party"	Unknown	Story by : Mark Rosner; Teleplay by : Barry Pullman	June 7, 1989	8.5	6.7/13
