= Screwball Hotel =

1988 American and British comedy film directed by Rafal Zielinski

- Directed by: Rafal Zielinski
- Written by: Nick Holeris; Sam Kaufman; Phil Kueber; B.K. Roderick; Charlie Wiener
- Produced by: Maurice Smith
- Starring: Michael Bendetti; Andrew Zeller; Jeff Greenman; Corinne Wahl; Kelly Monteith
- Cinematography: Thomas F. Denove
- Edited by: Debra Chiate; Joe Tornatore
- Music by: Michael Jay; Nathan Wang
- Distributed by: Universal Pictures
- Release date: December 9, 1988
- Running time: 101 minutes
- Countries: United Kingdom; United States
- Language: English

Screwball Hotel is a 1988 American and British comedy film directed by Rafal Zielinski and starring Michael Bendetti, Andrew Zeller, Jeff Greenman, Corinne Wahl, and Kelly Monteith. It is the second sequel to Screwballs.

== Premise ==
Three boys are expelled from military school and get jobs working at a hotel.

== Cast ==
- Michael Bendetti as Mike
- Andrew Zeller as Herbie
- Jeff Greenman as Norman
- Corinne Wahl as Cherry Amour
- Kelly Monteith as Mr. Ebell
