= The Prosecution of an American President =

- Directed by: Dave Hagen; David J. Burke
- Release date: 2012
- Country: United States

The Prosecution of an American President is a 2012 American documentary film about the Iraq War directed by Dave Hagen and David J. Burke. Former prosecutor Vincent Bugliosi outlines his legal case for prosecution of George W. Bush for deliberately starting the war under false pretenses, misleading America over Saddam Hussein's weapons of mass destruction, and falsely blaming Iraq for the 9/11 attacks. Noted attorney Alan Dershowitz also comments.

The film is based on the 2008 book The Prosecution of George W. Bush for Murder by Bugliosi, a former Los Angeles deputy district attorney. Bugliosi also testified in 2008 to the House Judiciary Committee on Bush's alleged crimes. The film documents Bugliosi as he presents to a UCLA law classroom his case that former president George W. Bush should be prosecuted for the deaths of over 4,000 American soldiers and 100,000 Iraqi civilians as a result of the invasion and war.

== Cast and crew ==
The film is based on a screenplay by Bugliosi and directed by Dave Hagen and David J. Burke. It was produced by Jim Shaban and NAFTC Studios, executive produced by, Jim Shaban and www.naftci.com, Nathan Folks, Peter Miller and D. Channsin Berry. It is based largely on a presentation Bugliosi made before a law class at UCLA, in which he prosecuted Bush. Attorney Alan Dershowitz also comments about the case.

== Release ==
The film had trouble getting into production. According to Daily Kos, it faced a "media black-out": it was scheduled to be on HBO but dropped shortly before broadcast. Due to the opposition or indifference of American companies, it was produced by Canadians, the Windsor Ontario NAFTC Studios.

The Prosecution of an American President premiered on October 3 at the Hollywood ArcLight theatre. It did select market testing in the East Coast. A proportion of profits from its theatrical release went to a veterans' charity, the Lost Soldiers Foundation.

== Critical reaction ==
The New York Times found the legal arguments repetitious but said other scenes conveyed the human cost of the war. The Hollywood Reporter found the film unconvincing, despite the writer admitting sympathy with its arguments. Village Voice also had criticisms, finding the film made no attempt at impartiality, and sections were too full of legalese. Long Island Press found it visually uninteresting but fascinating in its exploration of the border between war and murder, and awarded it 3 stars. Jim Emerson of the Chicago Sun-Times said it often felt like recycling of old news, but he defended its partisanship as a counterpoint to the dominant media at the time of the invasion.

== See also ==
- Efforts to impeach George W. Bush
- George W. Bush alleged war crimes
- Prosecutions of Donald Trump in New York
- Federal prosecution of Donald Trump
