= 20 Minute Workout =

Canadian exercise television program

- Created by: Ron Harris
- Written by: David Van Fleet
- Directed by: Ron Harris
- Presented by: Bess Motta; Arlaine Wright
- Opening theme: Shiva (1983); Peter Jermyn and Gilles Ouellet (1984)
- Ending theme: Shiva (1983); Peter Jermyn and Gilles Ouellet (1984)
- Countries of origin: Canada; United States
- No. of seasons: 2

Production
- Producers: Jamie Kellner; Ian McDougall; Jami Allen; Christopher Dalton; Wayne Fenske
- Running time: 30 minutes
- Production companies: Orion Entertainment Corporation; Nelvana; Chumcity

Original release
- Network: City (Canada); Syndication (US)
- Release: June 1983 – 1985

20 Minute Workout is a Canadian-produced aerobics-based television program that ran from 1983 to 1984, in which "a bevy of beautiful girls" demonstrated exercise on a rotating platform. It was created by Ron Harris in 1983, based on his cable TV series Aerobicise.

== Series background ==
The series was produced by Tantra Entertainment in association with the Canadian animation company Nelvana, and broadcast locally on Citytv. In the United States, it was syndicated by Orion Television. Two seasons of the program were produced, although reruns continued to appear for many years afterwards. The first season featured a different instructor for each day of the week, Monday through Friday. Bess Motta, Arlaine Wright, Holly Butler, Nicole Nardini, and Anne Schumacher all had speaking roles. The second season featured only Motta and Wright as instructors. One selling point of the show was the young attractive women exercising in leotards. The exercise routines were demanding, high-impact aerobics, followed by a stretching section. Pulsating music from synthesizers played in the background, although in the first season bass and electric guitar and saxophone were also used in the exercise music scores. For the first season, music was performed by the group Shiva. An "As Seen on TV" vinyl LP containing tracks used on the program was released by Ronco, Inc. in 1983 in the United States. Other versions and formats were also released in Canada, the UK, and Australia under the Ronco and Chadwick Music Productions labels. The second season featured music by the trio Jermyn/King/Ouillet.

20 Minute Workout is a spin-off from Aerobicise, a series of home videos that were first released in 1981, which had varying subtitles of "The Beginners Workout," "The Ultimate Workout," and "The Beautiful Workout." In 1982, a series of segments aired in the U.S. on Showtime as unscheduled filler in between features, and lasting no longer than five minutes. Both the videos and the filler featured a different cast, and unlike the show they later spawned, exercise instruction was either kept minimal, or not featured at all, and any that was present was given by an off-screen narrator. The narrator was Jami Allen, one of the show's producers.

"Aerobicise" is also the name of the original 1982 pilot episode of 20 Minute Workout.

Scenes from the show are visible on televisions in some scenes of 1984's Friday the 13th: The Final Chapter, Beat Street, Sesame Street Presents: Follow That Bird and the 1994 Luc Besson film Leon: The Professional. Additionally, some original music tracks from the 1983 album were used on the US version of the television game show The Price Is Right in the mid-1980s.

== Cast ==
=== First season ===
- Sharon Bisset
- Laurie Briscoe
- Holly Butler
- Sue Carter
- Bess Motta
- Nicole Nardini
- Anne Schumacher
- Leslie Smith
- Arlaine Wright

=== Second season ===
- Michelle Brimacombe
- Ella Collins
- Sharon Hasfal
- Alison Hope
- Nerise Houghton
- Bess Motta
- Anne Schumacher
- Arlaine Wright
