= The Prosecution of George W. Bush for Murder =

2008 book by Vincent Bugliosi

- Author: Vincent Bugliosi
- Language: English
- Subject: Politics, crime
- Publisher: Vanguard Press
- Publication date: 2008
- English publication date: May 27, 2008
- Media type: Hardcover
- Pages: 352
- ISBN: 978-1-59315-481-3
- Dewey Decimal: 973.931/092 22
- LC Class: E902 .B84 2008

The Prosecution of George W. Bush for Murder is a 2008 book by Vincent Bugliosi, a former prosecutor in Los Angeles. He argues that President George W. Bush took the United States into the invasion of Iraq under false pretenses and should be tried for murder for the deaths of American soldiers in Iraq.

The book sold more than 130,000 copies within its first three months of release. It was the basis of a documentary titled The Prosecution of an American President (2012).

== Content and themes ==
Bugliosi says that the Bush administration intentionally misled Congress and the American people about the evidence of nuclear weapons which he said mandated the US and allies to invade Iraq in 2003 and overthrow ruler Saddam Hussein. Bugliosi said as a prosecutor he would seek the death penalty. He said that an impeachment of Bush (as discussed by other opponents) would be "a joke" because of the scale of Bush's alleged crimes.

The strongest evidence against Bush, Bugliosi says, is a speech on October 7, 2002 claiming that Iraq posed an imminent threat to the security of the United States, and that Hussein was capable of attacking America at any time with his stockpile of weapons of mass destruction. A National Intelligence Estimate of less than a week earlier said that while Iraq did have WMD capabilities, it had no plans to use its weapons except in the capacity of self-defense, or if the United States threatened to attack Iraq. Bugliosi said that the president and his administration edited the "White Paper", or declassified version of the NIE released to Congress and the public, in order to present the Iraqi threat as more serious than it was in fact.

Throughout the book, he castigates Bush for what Bugliosi says is his callous and cavalier attitude regarding the deaths and suffering of American soldiers. Bugliosi noted from his investigation that Bush had spent a total of two and a half years of his presidency at various vacation spots outside Washington, DC, such as Camp David and his Texas ranch.

In addition, Bugliosi asserts that the Manning Memo shows that, far from making serious efforts to avoid war, Bush considered the possibility of provoking Saddam into starting a war by sending U-2 reconnaissance aircraft, falsely painted in UN colors, on flights over Iraq along with fighter escorts, and if Saddam ordered them shot down, it would constitute war.

He also argues that Bush pressured intelligence agencies to find proof that Saddam helped al-Qaeda plan the September 11, 2001 attacks.

== Adaptations ==
This book was the basis for The Prosecution of an American President, a 2012 American documentary film. The screenplay was written by Bugliosi and directed by Dave Hagen and David J. Burke. It was released on DVD on October 7, 2014.
