= Cecil Hoffman =

American film and television actress (born 1962)

Cecil Hoffmann
- Born: July 11, 1962 (age 64); McLean, Virginia, U.S.
- Other name: Heidi Hoffmann
- Education: Princeton University
- Occupation: Actress
- Spouse: Paul Slye (m. 1992)
- Children: 2

Cecil Hoffmann (born July 11, 1962) is an American film and television actress.

== Career ==
Best known for her portrayal of district attorney Zoey Clemmons in the television series L.A. Law, Hoffman starred on 26 episodes, spanning three seasons, from Spring 1991 to Fall 1992. She found success on the big screen, turning in performances in hit films Stargate (1993) and the Wyatt Earp biopic Tombstone (1994) with Kurt Russell. She also starred as Greer Monroe with William Devane in the ABC political soap opera The Monroes, which lasted just nine episodes in 1995-1996 television season.

In addition to L.A. Law and her motion picture work, Hoffman also starred in the NBC drama Dream Street (1989) with Thomas Calabro and as Hillary Stein, was a regular on the final season of Wiseguy in 1990. In 1996, she had a three episode guest-starring arc on ER and made two appearances on Picket Fences.

She has guest-starred in television series such as Strong Medicine, Providence, Any Day Now, The Larry Sanders Show, Madman of the People, and Family Law.
