= Edison (film) =

2005 thriller film

Edison Force
- Theatrical release poster
- Directed by: David J. Burke
- Written by: David J. Burke
- Produced by: Boaz Davidson; Randall Emmett; George Furla; John Thompson
- Starring: Morgan Freeman; LL Cool J; Justin Timberlake; Kevin Spacey; Dylan McDermott; Cary Elwes; John Heard; Piper Perabo; Marco Sanchez; Roselyn Sánchez
- Cinematography: Francis Kenny
- Edited by: Casey O. Rohrs
- Music by: Machine Head; Tobias Enhus; H. Scott Salinas
- Production companies: Millennium Films; Emmett/Furla Films; VIP 3 Medienfonds; Ascendant Pictures; Rising Star (poster credit only)
- Distributed by: Sony Pictures Home Entertainment
- Release dates: September 17, 2005 (TIFF); July 18, 2006 (United States)
- Running time: 97 minutes
- Country: United States
- Language: English
- Budget: $25 million
- Box office: $4.1 million

Edison (also known as Edison Force in some markets) is a 2005 American thriller film written and directed by David J. Burke, and starring Morgan Freeman, LL Cool J, Justin Timberlake (in his feature film debut), and Kevin Spacey.

The film premiered at Toronto International Film Festival on September 17, 2005 and was released on July 18, 2006.

== Plot ==
In the town of Edison, a police pursuit by tactical unit F.R.A.T. (First Response Assault and Tactical) ends with a shootout, in which veteran detective Francis Lazerov kills a criminal by shooting him through the sleeve of a hostage. Later, Lazerov and his partner, rookie Raphael "Rafe" Deed, break into a house and steal money and cocaine from two dealers. After Lazerov hears one of the dealers say he's going to rat them out, Lazerov tells Deed to shoot them, but Deed cannot, and so Lazerov kills the dealer. He tells the surviving dealer, Isaiah Charles, to say that his partner attacked him with a knife, so he had to shoot him, covering up the cops' actions and sparing Charles' life.

At the trial, Deed testifies about the incident to match the story Lazerov made up. Reporter Joshua Pollack overhears Charles thanking the cops and tries to question them about it with no success. He tries to write a story about it, but his editor Moses Ashford tells him to just write the verdict since he doesn't have facts to back up his theory about the cops being corrupt. Ashford fires Pollack after Pollack calls him a fraud. Pollack shows his girlfriend Willow his article and she agrees with Ashford.

Meanwhile, Deed is troubled by the shootout and subsequent raid while with his girlfriend Maria. He goes out for his "inspection," a private club where cops from the F.R.A.T. unit drink and play with strippers. F.R.A.T. captain Brian Tilman is also there. Pollack arrives at Ashford's house and tells him he's right about the story and asks for help in finding out more; Ashford gives him some tips and tells him to "do the work." Pollack goes to interview Charles, who promises him he'll help if Pollack can give a message to his sick mother.

After further investigating and bringing his suspicions to district attorney Jack Reigert and investigator Levon Wallace, Pollack and his girlfriend are beaten near to death outside of a dance club where Deed happens to be dancing as well. After Deed rushes out to help them, he recognizes the assailants as two cops from his unit, one of which is Lazerov. Deed visits Pollack in the hospital and meets Ashford. After seeing one of Tilman's lackeys running out, having intended to kill Pollack, Deed tells Ashford he's not safe and to move him. Wallace sets him up at his family farm for his safety while he investigates the unit. Charles is murdered in prison, and Lazerov tells Deed that his problem is solved. Lazerov arrives at Wallace's farm to kill Pollack, who escapes on a bicycle after blowing up Lazerov's car. Wallace and Ashford find him at a payphone after going searching.

Tilman meets Lazerov in a parking garage to chew him out for going rogue, and they argue about how Edison used to need brute force but now it needs "finesse", which Lazerov does not have. At a bar, Pollack meets Deed to try and convince him to come forward because he can likely get immunity. Deed refuses, telling him the courts are corrupt, as well. At the F.R.A.T. office, Lazerov attacks Deed because of a Herald article about the attack outside the club, which ends with Tilman fatally shooting Lazerov. Afterward, Deed sneaks back in at night and finds proof of the unit's corruption for Pollack, which he gives him the next day as he's about to get married. He tells Pollack he wants to be married for "death benefits," implying he believes F.R.A.T. will have him killed and he wants Maria to be taken care of financially. Wallace shows Ashford the headquarters for "Better Edison," a money laundering corporation that Reigert is heavily involved in.

Pollack prepares electronic copies of his story and sends them off to Ashford to print in the Herald. He also mails paper copies to several major newspapers. Deed is dispatched to kill Pollack but saves his life after one of his colleagues attempts to finish the job. After being chased by F.R.A.T. to a construction site, Deed kills the members of the unit, including Tilman, who was holding Pollack hostage. Reigert arrives, and Ashford tells him he will release all the evidence of Reigert and Better Edison's involvement with F.R.A.T. and money laundering if he ever tries to run for office. Reigert quietly dissolves Better Edison, Pollack goes to live with Willow after she recovers, and Deed leaves law enforcement to live quietly with his pregnant wife, looking around to make sure he is safe.

== Cast ==
- Morgan Freeman as Moses Ashford
- LL Cool J as Officer Raphael Deed
- Justin Timberlake as Joshua Pollack
- Kevin Spacey as Detective Levon Wallace
- Dylan McDermott as Sergeant Francis Lazerov
- John Heard as Captain Brian Tilman
- Cary Elwes as District Attorney Jack Reigert
- Damien Dante Wayans as Isiaha Charles
- Roselyn Sánchez as Maria
- Marco Sanchez as Reyes
- Piper Perabo as Willow Summerfield
- Françoise Yip as Crow

== Production ==
In May 2003, it was reported that Emmett/Furla Oasis had acquired Edison, a spec script by David J. Burke centered on a journalist who tries to take down a corrupt group of cops with Burke set to make his directorial debut. In December of that year, it was reported that Millennium Media would finance Edison and handle worldwide distribution. That same month Morgan Freeman, Kevin Spacey, and LL Cool J had been set to star in the film. In February 2004, Justin Timberlake joined the cast.

While the film was in production, some people speculated from the title of the film and the limited story details of corrupt officers that the film was based upon the New Jersey township of Edison, since the township's recent (as of that time) controversy involving its police force. Writer and film director David J. Burke claimed that the name "Edison" was derived from its common association with the inventor and business leader Thomas Edison, which led to thoughts of "electricity, power and industry."

== Release ==
The film was originally supposed to see a US release in the spring of 2005; however, due to its poor reviews from critics after its screening at the Toronto International Film Festival, its release to cinemas in the US and most other countries was cancelled. Sony Pictures Home Entertainment released the film, originally titled Edison, as Edison Force, direct–to–video on July 18, 2006. The film was released in theaters in Netherlands on March 12, 2006.

== Reception ==
On the review aggregator website Rotten Tomatoes, 11% of 9 critics' reviews are positive, with an average rating of 3.1/10.

In September 2017, when a Twitter user asked his followers to "name one bad Kevin Spacey movie", Spacey himself responded and simply wrote Edison.
