= The Soldier (1982 film) =

1982 film

- Theatrical release poster
- Directed by: James Glickenhaus
- Written by: James Glickenhaus
- Produced by: James Glickenhaus
- Starring: Ken Wahl; Alberta Watson; Jeremiah Sullivan; William Prince; Klaus Kinski
- Cinematography: Robert M. Baldwin
- Edited by: Paul Fried
- Music by: Tangerine Dream
- Production company: Embassy Pictures
- Distributed by: Embassy Pictures
- Release dates: July 7, 1982 (France); August 27, 1982 (U.S.)
- Running time: 96 minutes
- Country: United States
- Language: English
- Budget: $5.3-6 million
- Box office: $6,328,816 or $2,169,074

The Soldier (also released as Codename: The Soldier) is a 1982 American action thriller film written, directed, and produced by James Glickenhaus. It stars Ken Wahl as the title character, a covert CIA agent assigned to eliminate renegade KGB agents that have threatened to detonate a dirty bomb in the Ghawar Oil Field. The cast also features Alberta Watson, William Prince, Joaquim de Almeida, and Klaus Kinski. The original score was composed and performed by the German electronic band Tangerine Dream.

The film was released by Avco-Embassy Pictures on August 27, 1982.

== Plot ==
Renegade KGB agents hijack a plutonium shipment inside the United States and use it to plant a nuclear device in the Saudi Arabian Ghawar Oil Field. They threaten to detonate it, thereby contaminating 50% of the world's oil reserve, unless Israel withdraws its settlements from the West Bank. In Washington, D.C., the American President contemplates starting a war with Israel, in order to save the world from a potential oil crisis. Washington is unaware that the KGB are behind this threat. The President orders the head of the CIA to find out who has planted the bomb and to do anything he can to stop this.

An elite CIA agent codenamed 'The Soldier', working outside the usual channels, is assigned to the case. After Russian agent Dracha attempts to terminate him in the Austrian Alps, he contacts the CIA director from the US embassy in West Berlin. A KGB agent assassinates the director and frames The Soldier for his murder, leaving no official knowledge of his activities other than the president, who has disavowed any knowledge of his actions. On the run from his own government, he seeks refuge in the Israeli embassy. He and his team cooperate with Mossad, represented by their director of covert operations Susan Goodman. Meanwhile, the President authorizes military action against Israel.

Given the unpleasant options of the KGB destroying a large part of the world's oil supply or the United States having to invoke a military response to force Israel to remove its settlements from the West Bank, the Soldier decides to take a third option. His team infiltrates and captures a US nuclear missile silo in Smith Center, Kansas, and obtains independent launch capability. As the American military launches their air strikes toward Israel, The Soldier and Susan break into East Berlin by launching their Porsche over the Berlin Wall, confronting the KGB agents and informing them that if their nuke in Saudi Arabia is detonated, his team in Smith Center will nuke Moscow. This forces the KGB to dismantle their device in Saudi Arabia and the American air strike is recalled.

== Cast ==
- Ken Wahl as 'The Soldier'
- Alberta Watson as Susan Goodman
- Jeremiah Sullivan as Ivan
- William Prince as The President
- Joaquim de Almeida as 'Unus'
- Peter Hooten as 'Duo'
- Steve James as 'Tribus'
- Alexander Spencer as 'Quartus'
- Klaus Kinski as Dracha
- Al Israel as Keene
- Ned Eisenberg as Hirsch
- Martin Höner as Michael
- Jeffrey Jones as US Assistant Secretary of Defense
- Željko Ivanek as Bombmaker
- Ron Harper as CIA Director
- Reuben Singer as Israeli Prime Minister

Country music singer George Strait has a cameo appearance as himself, performing the song "Fool-Hearted Memory".

== Production ==
James Glickenhaus first conceived the film's premise after reading John McPhee's The Curve of Binding Energy which explained the methods by which plutonium is transported. Glickenhaus scouted locations in West Berlin and Munich, Germany, after receiving an offer of West German financing, provided that the project be set partially in that country. Glickenhaus traveled for four weeks before composing a first draft of The Soldier, based on places he had seen and devoid of sequences that would be expensive or difficult to shoot. He then continued his travels for an additional two weeks in order to reaffirm what he had written. After the promised West German funding fell through, Glickenhaus took the project to Avco Embassy Pictures assuring the company his thorough planning would enable them to produce the picture at a lower budget, as they had done with his previous film, The Exterminator. Avco Embassy agreed to provide $6 million in production costs and serve as a worldwide distributor. Glickenhaus arranged foreign sales deals at the 1980 Cannes Film Festival, which fully recouped the film’s budget well before its scheduled domestic release.

The film was shot on location in Philadelphia, Buffalo, New York City, West Berlin, and Israel. A sequence was filmed at the actual Checkpoint Charlie in Berlin, the first time a film production had received permission to do so. The ski sequence was shot in St Anton am Arlberg, Austria.

=== Filming ===
According to an interview with director Glickenhaus, the scene with Klaus Kinski was added when the production was under budget and they were able to get Kinski for one day.

== Release ==
After screening at the 1982 Cannes Film Market, the film first premiered in France on July 7, 1982. It was released theatrically in West Germany and Austria, before its US premiere on August 20, 1982.

=== Home media ===
The Soldier was released on Blu-ray by boutique label Kino Lorber on March 27, 2018. The release features commentaries by Glickenhaus and film historian Jim Hemphill.

== Soundtrack ==
The Soldier

Soundtrack album by Tangerine Dream
- Released: 2020
- Recorded: 1982
- Genre: Electronic music

The film's soundtrack was performed and recorded by Tangerine Dream. All tracks were composed by Edgar Froese, Chris Franke, and Johannes Schmoelling. The soundtrack was released as part of the box set Pilots of Purple Twilight (The Virgin Recordings 1980-1983) (2020). "The Soldier: Opening Theme" was released on the bootleg '70/90 (1990). "Soldier on the Beach" was released on the fan release Tangerine Tree Volume 50: Assorted Secrets 2 (2004).

| No. | Title | Length |
|---|---|---|
| 1. | "Main Titles" | 2:03 |
| 2. | "Cue #1: Variation on Logos #1" | 4:55 |
| 3. | "Cue #2: Variation on Horizon #1" | 2:59 |
| 4. | "Cue #3: The Soldier #1" | 5:45 |
| 5. | "Cue #4: Variation on Dolphin Dance" | 1:28 |
| 6. | "Cue #5: Variation on Tangent #1" | 2:28 |
| 7. | "Cue #6: The Soldier #2" | 3:46 |
| 8. | "Cue #7: The Soldier #3" | 1:50 |
| 9. | "Cue #8: The Soldier #4" | 3:12 |
| 10. | "Cue #9: The Soldier #5" | 4:20 |
| 11. | "Cue #10: Variation on Horizon #2" | 5:16 |
| 12. | "Cue #11: The Soldier #6" | 2:53 |
| 13. | "Cue #12: The Soldier #7" | 1:42 |
| 14. | "Cue #13: Variation on Logos #2" | 2:10 |
| 15. | "Cue #14: The Soldier #8" | 7:29 |
| 16. | "Cue #15: Variation on Horizon #3" | 7:47 |
