= Double Dare (TV series) =

- Genre: Drama; Mystery
- Created by: Garry Michael White
- Developed by: Leon Tokatyan
- Directed by: Christian I. Nyby II; Paul Krasny
- Starring: Billy Dee Williams; Ken Wahl; Janet Carroll; Joseph Maher
- Composer: Sylvester Levay
- Country of origin: United States
- Original language: English
- No. of seasons: 1
- No. of episodes: 7 (1 unaired)

Production
- Executive producer: Terry Hughes
- Producers: Leon Tokatyan; Carl Pingatore; David Abramowitz; Shelly Berger
- Cinematography: Robert F. Sparks
- Production companies: Terry Hughes Productions; December Enterprises, Inc. Wanderers Productions, Inc. Warner Bros. Television

Original release
- Network: CBS
- Release: April 10 – May 22, 1985

Double Dare is a mystery television series that was broadcast on CBS for only one season in 1985, on Wednesday nights at 8:00 pm ET. The premise for this show is similar to that of the earlier series It Takes a Thief.

== Plot ==
Professional thief Billy Diamond is captured by San Francisco Police Lieutenant Samantha Warner, who offers him a deal: if he uses his burglary skills to work undercover for the police, he won't have to go to jail. Diamond agrees, on the condition that his former partner in crime, Ken Sisko, is sprung from jail to work as his partner in crimefighting.

== Cast ==
- Billy Dee Williams as Billy Diamond
- Ken Wahl as Ken Sisko
- Janet Carroll as Lt. Samantha Warner
- Joseph Maher as Sylvester

== Episodes ==
Seven episodes were made, but only six were broadcast.

| No. | Title | Directed by | Written by | Original release date |
|---|---|---|---|---|
| 1 | "Double Negative" | Christian I. Nyby II | Leon Tokatyan, Garry Michael White | April 10, 1985 |
| 2 | "Hong Kong Con" "Double Faced" | Christian I. Nyby II | Tom Chehak | April 17, 1985 |
| 3 | "The Lady Is a Tramp" | Unknown | Unknown | April 24, 1985 |
| 4 | "Now You See It, Now You See It" | Christian I. Nyby II | Robert McKee | May 1, 1985 |
| 5 | "Three's a Killer" | Paul Krasny | Robert Sherman | May 15, 1985 |
| 6 | "Double Talk" | Unknown | Joseph Gunn | May 22, 1985 |
| 7 | "Diamonds Are for Murder" | TBD | TBD | Unaired |
