= The Dirty Dozen: Next Mission =

1985 American made-for-TV movie

- Promotional release poster
- Genre: Action; War
- Written by: Michael Kane
- Directed by: Andrew V. McLaglen
- Starring: Lee Marvin; Ernest Borgnine; Ken Wahl; Larry Wilcox; Sonny Landham; Richard Jaeckel
- Music by: Richard Harvey
- Country of origin: United States
- Original language: English

Production
- Producer: Harry R. Sherman
- Cinematography: John Stanier
- Editor: Alan Strachan
- Running time: 95 minutes
- Production company: MGM/UA Television

Original release
- Network: NBC
- Release: February 4, 1985

The Dirty Dozen: Next Mission is a 1985 made-for-TV film and sequel to the original 1967 film The Dirty Dozen, directed by Andrew V. McLaglen and reuniting Lee Marvin, Ernest Borgnine and Richard Jaeckel 18 years after the original hit war film. Marvin returns to lead an all-new dirty dozen on a mission to assassinate SS General Sepp Dietrich, played by Wolf Kahler.

== Plot ==
In September 1944 US Army Major General Worden learns through the French Resistance that Waffen-SS General Dietrich and other high-ranking Nazi officials in German occupied France plan to make a second attempt on Adolf Hitler's life. Worden and other Allied generals are worried that if Dietrich succeeds, more skilled leadership will replace Hitler and prolong the war.

Major John Reisman is on trial for theft when Worden makes him an offer: train twelve US soldiers convicted for military crimes for a mission to assassinate General Dietrich, or remain on trial. Reisman returns to Marston Tyne Military Prison to select thirteen prisoners with the help of MP Sergeant Clyde Bowren. The baker's dozen (Valentine, Wells, Sixkiller, Perkins, Dregors, Deutsch, Wright, Le Clair, Baxley, Reynolds, Sanders, Anderson and Rosen) is assembled by Reisman and Bowren at a disused train station. When Rosen is insubordinate Reisman has him returned to prison and trains the remaining dozen. Valentine attempts to escape during a German air raid, Sixkiller and Wells bring him back, and explain he was merely sleepwalking.

Reisman and the Dozen fly into a German-held French airfield disguised in German uniforms to rendezvous with a bus. Belatedly realizing that Dregors' black skin would betray the fact they are not Wehrmacht soldiers, Reisman bandages his face as though wounded. A Gestapo agent notices his bare, black hands and sounds an alarm, forcing the Dozen to escape in the bus. Wright attempts to murder Reisman during the chase but is shot and killed by Sixkiller. When the bus driver is killed, the resulting crash kills Anderson. The mission falls behind schedule and Dietrich's train leaves the target area.

The Dozen proceed on foot and attempt to commandeer a French farm truck, but the farmer recognizes they are speaking English and shows them a Mercedes-Benz stashed in his barn. The vehicle overheats after a short distance and they abandon it. Valentine refuses to walk and threatens to pull his gun on Reisman. Wells and Sixkiller pull away from the group and train their guns on the rest of the Dozen. They stop to eat in a church, and when Reisman insists on following the train, Dreggers refuses. Valentine trains his weapon on Sixkiller and them men all agree they want to abandon the mission. When Reisman tells them there is a shipment of gold aboard the train, they agree to continue the mission. During an encounter with a German patrol, their commander notices Dregors and in the ensuring firefight Perkins, Sanders and Baxley are wounded.

On the train, Dietrich discovers he has aroused suspicions in his second-in-command, Colonel Schmidt, and shoots him dead. The train arrives at a depot where it is met by hundreds of German troops. The Dozen arrive on foot and shelter behind a stone wall. Reisman reveals he lied about the gold. Dregors contemplates disobeying orders and shooting Hitler instead of Dietrich. Reisman convinces him otherwise and Dregors kills Dietrich with a sniper rifle. Hitler is whisked off in a car while the large reception party counter-attacks the Dozen. Rather than flee, the dozen attacks the train, finding it laden with priceless art works and Beethoven's original piano.

As the Dozen fight their way to Hitler's plane everyone except for Reisman, Dregors, Perkins, Valentine and Wells are killed before they take off. Dregors, shot in the stomach, dies from his wounds, and Reisman finds a briefcase tucked under a seat, containing top-secret intelligence information as well as a bag of jewels, which he agrees to split with the three survivors. They crash land in England and are held at gunpoint by a farmer until Reisman speaks English. The farmer tells them of a good pub in the nearby town, and Reisman agrees to buy them all a round of drinks.

== Cast ==
- Lee Marvin as Major John Reisman
- Ernest Borgnine as Major General Sam Worden
- Richard Jaeckel as Sergeant Clyde Bowren
- Ken Wahl as Louis Valentine
- Sonny Landham as Sam Sixkiller
- Larry Wilcox as Tommy Wells
- Ricco Ross as Arlen Dregors
- Gavan O'Herlihy as Conrad E. Perkins
- Jay Benedict as Didier Le Clair
- Stephen Hattersley as Otto Deutsch
- Rolf Saxon as Robert E. Wright
- Michael John Paliotti as Baxley
- Paul Herzberg as Reynolds
- Jeff Harding as Sanders
- Sam Douglas as Anderson
- Russell Sommers as Gary Rosen
- Wolf Kahler as General Sepp Dietrich
- Bruce Boa as a US Colonel
- Don Fellows as General Trent Tucker
- Michael Sheard as Adolf Hitler
