= Ron Harris (photographer) =

American photographer and television director

Ron Harris (1933 – May 26, 2017) was an American photographer, videographer, and television director.

== Early life and career ==
Harris was born in The Bronx, and attended High School of Performing Arts. He began his career as a fashion photographer.

== Aerobicise ==
In 1980, Aerobicise began with a four-minute pilot featuring Harris’ then girlfriend, Jami Allen, later associate producer and voice-over of Aerobicise.

In 1981, Harris created and directed the exercise show, Aerobicise on the cable television network Showtime. Aerobicise was nominated for a CableACE Award and became the highest grossing exercise video series of its time. He later created 20 Minute Workout.

Most of the performers in the original Aerobicise show were trained dancers. The performers included Jane Leeves, Jami Allen, Loryanna Catalano, Deborah Corday, Tina Rocca, Tamarah Park, Beth Farrelly, Amanda Lee, Debbie Bellman, Evangeline Browne, Darcy DeMoss, Lee Nicholl, Dan Peterson, and Adria Wilson.

The uniqueness of the Aerobicise concept was that it filmed performers using a white turntable floor, which rotated as the exercises were performed, with little narration. A unique soundtrack was also created just for the show. This contrasted with typical exercise videos and TV shows of the day, which were filmed in a typical room with an instructor at the front of the room. The choreographed exercises had the performers in configurations that lent themselves to filming from various angles, including above the turntable. It produced an artistic and even hypnotic approach to exercise programming.

The Library of Congress Copyright Collection has 55 Showtime episodes.

In 1985, Harris wrote the book Aerobicise 20 minutes a day published and distributed by Simon & Schuster in 1986.

The Aerobicise series was released by Paramount Home Video between 1982 and 1995 and was available in LaserDisc, CED, VHS, and DVD formats. In 1983, Aerobiscise: The Original Music was also sold through the Ronco label on vinyl and cassette tapes.

== Later career and controversy ==
Years after Aerobiscise and its spinoffs on network TV had been a great success, Harris decided to jettison fashion and artistic work for pornography in the early days of widespread internet use. In 1996, Harris launched RonHarris.com, an adult-oriented website featuring models between the ages of 18 and 24. He used his white turntable, formerly used for Aerobiscise, with fully nude models.

In 1999, Harris dipped further into controversy and launched ronsangels.com, a site that, according to the BBC, offered "the eggs of eight models for auction over the internet" with bids starting "between US$15,000 and US$150,000, depending on the model". Harris describes his idea as, "Darwin's natural selection at its very best". Critics have stated that this equates to profit-based eugenics. The egg auction portion of site was revealed to be a hoax, a mere publicity stunt designed to drive traffic to Harris' pornographic website, then called eroticboxoffice.com.

In 2013, American Apparel teamed with Harris to create a tumblr.
