= Corinne Alphen =

American model and actress

- Other name: Corinne Wahl
- Occupations: Model, actress
- Years active: 1980–1994
- Spouse: Ken Wahl (m. 1983; div. 1991)

Corinne Alphen is an American model and actress. She was a two-time Penthouse Pet of the Month (June 1978 and August 1981) and was selected as the 1982 Pet of the Year.

== Biography ==
Alphen is one of five children of William Alphen, who had served as a deputy chief of police, and his wife, Marjorie. Her siblings are sister Robin and brothers Billy, Scott, and Glenn.

Alphen was chosen as Penthouse Pet of the Month for June 1978 and again for August 1981. She was named the 1982 Pet of the Year. She appeared in US movies and TV shows in the 1980s and early 1990s. Roger Ebert's review of the 1983 teen film Spring Break praised her appearance, and regretted that hers was not the film's main role. In 1984 she starred with a then unknown Willem Dafoe in the erotic vignette film, New York Nights. She appeared in the 1987 comedy Amazon Women on the Moon as an interactive video girl, and also in 1987 she starred in the post-apocalyptic film Equalizer 2000. Corinne played a dominatrix in the 1988 comedy Screwball Hotel. In 1991, Alphen made an appearance on the TV sitcom Night Court. She also appeared in an episode of the detective series, Mike Hammer. She studied at the Tarot School of New York, receiving two certifications in advanced tarot card reading.

== Personal life ==
She was married to actor Ken Wahl from 1983 or 1984 (sources differ) until their 1991 divorce, and was occasionally credited as Corinne Wahl during their marriage. Alphen and Wahl have one child together, a son named Raymond Wahl. In 2009, Wahl sued his former business manager, Henry Levine, alleging that Levine conspired with Alphen, to defraud him. Wahl also granted Levine power of attorney, according to the lawsuit filed March 30, 2009, in Los Angeles Superior Court, ultimately allowing Levine and Alphen to set up a company "that enabled the secret skimming of funds" from Wahl's bank account. She demanded $7,000 a month in child support for their son.

1970s	Evelyn Treacher	Stephanie McLean	Tina McDowall	Patricia Barrett	Avril Lund
1970s	Anneka Di Lorenzo	Laura Bennett Doone	Victoria Lynn Johnson	Dominique Maure	Cheryl Rixon
1980s	Isabella Ardigo	Danielle Deneux	Corinne Alphen	Sheila Kennedy	Linda Kenton
1980s	None	Cody Carmack	Mindy Farrar	Patty Mullen	Ginger Miller
1990s	Stephanie Page	Simone Brigitte	Jisel	Julie Strain	Sasha Vinni
1990s	Gina LaMarca	Andi Sue Irwin	Elizabeth Ann Hilden	Paige Summers	Nikie St. Gilles
2000s	Juliet Cariaga	Zdeňka Podkapová	Megan Mason	Sunny Leone	Victoria Zdrok
2000s	Martina Warren	Jamie Lynn	Heather Vandeven	Erica Ellyson	Taya Parker
2010s	Taylor Vixen	Nikki Benz	Jenna Rose	Nicole Aniston	Lexi Belle
2010s	Layla Sin	Kenna James	Jenna Sativa	Gina Valentina	Gianna Dior
2020s	Lacy Lennon	Kenzie Anne	Amber Marie	Tahlia Paris	Renee Olstead
2020s	Kassie Wallis	-	-	-	-
