= Holly Butler =

American actress, dancer and aerobics instructor

- Born: Ceres, California

Holly Gaye Butler is an American actress, singer/songwriter, dancer and former aerobics instructor who appeared in the :20 Minute Workout Television Show's first season (1983). The :20 Minute Workout became the longest running syndicated exercise show, airing in 57 countries. One of the primary instructors of the first season, Holly was noted as the wholesome, girl next door type, and was chosen along with Bess Motta and Anne Schumacher to tour the U.S. throughout 1983 visiting television stations, and making personal appearances promoting the show. Holly opted out of participating in the second season (1984) in order to pursue her acting career.

Born in Ceres, California, Holly moved to Los Angeles in 1981 to pursue an acting career. After the :20 Minute Work-out, Holly appeared in several television shows throughout the 1980s and 1990s including co-starring roles in Hunter, Jake and the Fatman, Cybill, Crime Story, Reasonable Doubts, In Living Color, Mike Hammer, Private Eye, Rags to Riches, Moloney and A Peaceable Kingdom. Holly had a starring role in the short lived teen soap opera Tribes which aired on the Fox network in 1990. Holly toured the U.S. throughout the late 1980s and early 1990s as Universal Studios Hollywood's premier Marilyn Monroe impersonator and appeared in the film Netherworld appearing as Marilyn Monroe. As a songwriter, Holly had a country single, "What a Shame" recorded by Rebecca Lynn Howard in 2003.
