= David J. Burke =

American film director

- Born: November 8, 1948 (age 77); Raleigh, North Carolina, U.S.
- Occupations: Producer, director, screenwriter
- Years active: 1986–present

David J. Burke (born November 8, 1948) is an American executive producer, screenwriter, and film and television director.

Burke has produced Law & Order: Special Victims Unit, seaQuest DSV, TriBeCa, and other shows.

== Filmography ==
=== As director ===
- Wiseguy (1989) – One episode, "Sins of the Father"
- TriBeCa (1993) – One episode, "Honor"
- seaQuest DSV (1994–1995) – Two episodes, "Alone", "The Good Death"
- Edison (2005)
- Animal (2005)
- The Prosecution of an American President (2012)
