= Wiseguy (TV series) =

American crime drama television series (1987–1990)

- Season 1 title card
- Genre: Crime drama; Mystery; Police procedural
- Created by: Stephen J. Cannell; Frank Lupo
- Showrunner: David J. Burke (S1–S3); Peter Lance (S4)
- Starring: Ken Wahl; Jonathan Banks; Jim Byrnes; Steven Bauer; Cecil Hoffman
- Theme music composer: Mike Post
- Composers: Mike Post; Walter Murphy (S2–S3); Velton Ray Bunch (S4)
- Country of origin: United States
- Original language: English
- No. of seasons: 4
- No. of episodes: 75 (3 unaired)

Production
- Executive producers: Stephen J. Cannell; David J. Burke; Stephen Kronish
- Producers: Rod Holcomb (pilot); Brent-Karl Clackson; Alfonse Ruggiero, Jr.; Alex Beaton
- Production location: Vancouver, British Columbia, Canada (S1–S3); Miami, Florida, US (S4)
- Running time: 45–48 minutes
- Production company: Stephen J. Cannell Productions

Original release
- Network: CBS
- Release: September 16, 1987 – December 8, 1990

Wiseguy is an American crime drama television series created by Stephen J. Cannell and Frank Lupo, that aired on CBS from September 16, 1987, to December 8, 1990, for a total of 75 episodes over four seasons. It centered on undercover agents of the Organized Crime Bureau (OCB), a fictional division of the FBI, as they infiltrated organized crime groups.

Wiseguy originally starred Ken Wahl as Vinnie Terranova, a Brooklyn native and Fordham University graduate who was a deep cover operative for the FBI under the supervision of senior agent Frank McPike, played by Jonathan Banks. The primary cast was rounded out by Jim Byrnes, who played an information operative known as Lifeguard (real name Daniel Burroughs) who assisted Vinnie in the field.

After the third season, Wahl departed from the series. Steven Bauer was brought in to replace Wahl as the lead, with Cecil Hoffman joining as a fourth regular cast member alongside Bauer and the returning Banks and Byrnes. Wiseguy ended its run midway through 1991 with three produced episodes left unaired.

The series was filmed in Vancouver, British Columbia, one of the first American television series to embrace "Hollywood North's" lower production costs compared to the United States. Over its run, it was nominated for seven Primetime Emmy Awards (including for Outstanding Drama Series) and four Golden Globe Awards, with Wahl winning Best Actor – Television Series Drama in 1990.

== Synopsis ==
The series followed Vincent "Vinnie" Terranova, an undercover agent of the OCB (Organized Crime Bureau), a fictional division of the FBI. The show kept its focus on both the mechanics of being deep undercover and the consequences of the protagonist's actions.

Unlike similar series of the day, Wiseguy was serialized over multiple episodes telling a self-contained story that would conclude in the final episode of the cycle. This gave rise to the industry term "story arc". Some cycles were short while others were extended, but each new story had a specific set of central characters exclusive to it who would appear over the course of multiple episodes.

=== Season 1 ===
==== Sonny Steelgrave storyline ====
FBI undercover agent Vinnie Terranova is released from prison after serving an 18-month sentence to establish his cover. After his training agent is murdered by Dave Steelgrave (Gianni Russo), an Atlantic City Mafia boss, Vinnie vows to infiltrate the organization and take the Steelgraves down. He earns the trust of Sonny Steelgrave (Ray Sharkey), Dave's brother, and after Dave's death and the apparent defection of one of the Steelgrave captains, he is made Sonny's second-in-command. Over time, Vinnie feels conflicted by his genuine feelings of friendship towards Sonny, and having to lie to his mother about his work for the government in order to maintain his cover. After an attack lands her in the hospital, Vinnie tells his mother the true nature of his work rather than risk her going to her grave thinking him a criminal. Vinnie's contacts Frank McPike and Lifeguard learn of this breach in protocol through surveillance but conceal it from their superiors using an edited audio recording.

With Vinnie's info, the OCB sets up concealed video cameras at the venue for Sonny's bachelor party. Sonny murders "Pat the Cat" Patrice, his chief Mafia rival, at the party. When he finds police have surrounded the building, Sonny realizes that Vinnie, who knew about a hit Patrice put on him and said nothing, must be an undercover agent. About to be arrested for his crimes, Sonny takes his own life rather than face prison. The story arc ends with it in doubt whether Vinnie will be able to overcome the guilt he feels over his betrayal of Sonny and continue to work as an undercover agent.

==== Mel Profitt storyline ====
Vinnie, using his reputation as part of the Steelgrave crime family, makes contact with a hitman/assassin named Roger Lococco (William Russ). However, Vinnie soon discovers a much bigger target: Roger's boss, the manic depressive billionaire arms dealer Mel Profitt (Kevin Spacey) and his sister Susan (Joan Severance), with whom he has an incestuous relationship. Mel is addicted to prescription medication (always administered to him by Susan) which further contributes to his unstable emotional state. He is also a believer in Malthusian economics. Matters are complicated by Vinnie falling in love with Susan and beginning a sexual relationship with her.

Lococco (who turns out to be a CIA agent) encourages Mel to finance insurrectionist Louis Cabra of the Caribbean nation Il Pavao, but Mel becomes convinced that Cabra put a death curse on him. Cabra's rival insurrectionist Emanja Mora offers Mel help, but takes advantage of his trust to steal the crystal which Mel believes houses his soul and gives it to Lococco, who smashes it in front of Mel. As a result, Mel suffers a complete mental breakdown. In a mercy killing, Susan injects Mel with a lethal overdose of amphetamines and gives him a Viking funeral. Susan goes insane (with help from Lococco, who gaslights her in order to obtain signed withdrawal slips for Mel's accounts) and is committed to a mental facility.

The Profitt connection is part of a plot by the CIA to train mercenaries and install a puppet regime in Il Pavao. With info given him by Vinnie, Lococco learns his training officer and immediate superior Herb Ketcher is running the operation as a front for an American corporation. Lococco turns state's evidence. Shortly after his testimony, Lococco goes off the grid. Ketcher, after being exposed, takes his own life before consequences can be dealt him. As the arc comes to an end, Vinnie announces his resignation from the OCB.

Stephen J. Cannell, producer of Wiseguy, stated that the character Jim Profit from the short-lived Fox series Profit (which Cannell also produced) was named after and partially based on the Mel Profitt character. Writer/artist John Byrne has acknowledged that his characters Desmond and Phoebe Marrs, main cast members of the 1990s comic book series Namor the Sub-Mariner, were heavily inspired by Mel and Susan Profitt.

=== Season 2 ===
==== White supremacy story line ====
At the beginning of the second season, Vinnie is living at home with his mother and brother, Father Pete (Gerald Anthony) and working for a friend at a gas station as everyone in his neighborhood still believes he is in the Mafia. McPike is dispatched to find Vinnie by the new director of OCB, Paul Beckstead (Ken Jenkins). McPike must either debrief Vinnie to accept his resignation, or bring him back from sabbatical. Vinnie refuses to go along.

Vinnie's friend gets an eviction notice and nearly is driven to sabotage in an attempt to protect his business. A patron of his turns him on to the teachings of Dr. Knox Pooley (Fred Dalton Thompson), who leads a nativist group with white supremacist leanings called the "Pilgrims of Promise". His right-hand man, Calvin Hollis (Paul Guilfoyle), is an extremist, and leads a group of Pilgrims in an attack on a synagogue. Pete goes on television condemning the attack; shortly after he is run down in an alley.

After agreeing to return to work, but only on his terms, Vinnie arranges a gun sale to Calvin, against the advice of Beckstead, who believes the Pilgrims of Promise are harmless kooks not worth pursuing. Vinnie calls off the sting when Calvin shows up at the exchange with Ritchie (Tim Guinee), a young neighborhood friend. Ritchie confesses to Vinnie that he helped Calvin get the money for the guns in an armed robbery in which an off-duty police officer was murdered. Vinnie takes Ritchie under his wing, guiding him as an undercover agent in hopes of reducing his inevitable sentence as accessory to murder.

Vinnie finds Pete's personal effects in the grill of a car parked at a Pilgrims of Promise rally, but refrains from exacting vengeance, instead setting up his brother's killer for arrest at an arms deal. Hollis murders a talk show host who ridiculed the Pilgrims of Promise on the air. This leads Pooley to disown him. Ritchie recovers the murder weapon, allowing a warrant to be issued for Calvin's arrest, but Calvin perishes in a home invasion gone awry. Ritchie is sentenced to 18 months. Pooley escapes prosecution by claiming to be just a con man and getting Calvin to exonerate him from any involvement in the murders in a recorded phone call. He moves on to selling beachfront real estate in Florida.

==== Garment trade story line ====
David Sternberg (Ron Silver) and his father Eli (Jerry Lewis) run a clothing business, and are being squeezed by garment district kingpin Rick Pinzolo (Stanley Tucci). David goes to the OCB for help; thus Vinnie is recruited to act as security for the Sternbergs. In the episode "Next of Kin," Vinnie is hit by a taxi cab and replaced by agent John Henry Raglin (Anthony Denison), a philandering family man who was on a leave of absence after he blew the covers of two OCB agents during an interrogation. (This was done in order to allow Ken Wahl to recover from a broken ankle he suffered in an on-set accident.) John finds that Pinzolo has no way of profiting from his antagonism of the Sternbergs, leading him to the realization that Pinzolo is in fact merely a pawn of David's cousin Carole (Patricia Charbonneau), daughter of the company's founder. She blames Eli for taking the company from her father and seduced Pinzolo in order to get him to do the dirty work.

A shipment of dresses modified by Pinzolo to lack sufficient flame retardant brings on a wave of class action lawsuits, toppling the Sternberg company. David goes over the edge, kidnapping Pinzolo and attacking bank security guards with a gun, prompting them to fatally shoot David. Suddenly fearing Pinzolo will have her killed in order to prevent her incriminating him, Carole goes to Pinzolo in hopes he will say something incriminating for her tape recorder, but he kills her instead. Having failed to produce any evidence of wrongdoing and allowed everyone who might have testified against Pinzolo to be killed, John simply murders Pinzolo.

==== Dead Dog Records story line ====
Upon his recovery, Vinnie is informed that music label Dead Dog Records was seized by the Drug Enforcement Administration, who traded it to the OCB. Vinnie proposes to infiltrate the music industry in search of corruption as the new executive of Dead Dog. Fast-talking, puppy-dog-eyed talent agent Bobby Travis (Glenn Frey) talks Vinnie into taking him on as a minority partner; Vinnie realizes Bobby is washed up in the industry but can show him the ropes and be the public face of Dead Dog so that his cover is maintained. Bobby tells him about cleans, music products sold overseas and left off the accounting books, thus bypassing taxes and royalties.

Hoping to raise Dead Dog's profile so he can connect with people selling cleans, Vinnie signs fallen idol Diana Price (Debbie Harry) and funds a recording of her song "Brite Side" under brilliant but violent tempered producer Johnny Medley (Paul McCrane). English-American record mogul Winston Newquay (pronounced Noo-kway, rather than Nyoo-key in the English fashion) offers to buy Dead Dog Records, but Vinnie distrusts him and instead turns Dead Dog over to the husband-and-wife owners of Shakala Records, Isaac (Paul Winfield) and Amber Twine (Patti D'Arbanville). Isaac proves to be as crooked as Newquay; on an overseas business trip Bobby finds Isaac has released a bootleg EP consisting of "Bright Side" (Price's only song with Dead Dog/Shakala) and some standards recorded by Price soundalikes. Newquay, played by Tim Curry, is Price's former manager and lover, and Vinnie sends her to Jamaica for fear she will sign with Newquay again.

Vinnie tries to tempt away Newquay's hottest act, singer Eddie Tempest (Billy Wirth), with the opportunity to work with Medley and hit songwriter Monroe Blue (Ron Taylor). The fight over Eddie becomes moot after Isaac, a compulsive gambler, loses Shakala Records to Newquay in a poker game. Eddie discovers Newquay has been siphoning off his accounts after one of his checks bounces; he tries to get revenge by seducing Newquay's wife Claudia (Deidre Hall), not knowing the Newquays routinely have extramarital affairs in order to spice up their relationship. During sex they fall through a skylight to their deaths.

OCB's efforts to build a case around Newquay's selling of cleans prove fruitless, since Newquay is savvy enough to keep the profits from the cleans overseas. A sting operation in which Isaac offers Newquay an unreleased Eddie Tempest tape yields a recording of Newquay planning to sell cleans of the tape. The case is dismissed as entrapment, but the recording leads many artists to abandon Newquay after Bobby shows them loopholes which allow them to exit their contracts while retaining the rights to their recordings. Isaac dies when sex with Amber elevates his heart rate to the point of a heart attack. Grief over the sex-caused deaths of Claudia and Isaac (who was both Newquay's business rival and his best friend) drives Newquay to a mental breakdown. Now believing himself to be Elvis Presley, he is institutionalized and the running of his company turned over to a trustee. Amber relaunches Shakala Records from the ground up. Dead Dog Records is turned over to Bobby.

==== Le Lacrime d'Amore ====
This arc, which lasts just two episodes, acts as a bridge between "Aria for Don Aiuppo", the Dead Dog Records story, and the Mafia Wars story. Amber plans to sell Shakala Records with the counsel of attorney Roger Totland (Thomas Ian Griffith), who is also wining and dining her. Driven by jealousy, Vinnie runs a background check on Roger and deduces that he is negotiating for Shakala to be sold to a crooked real estate developer. Amber calls off the sale and begins a romantic relationship with Vinnie. His mother and stepfather, Don Rudy Aiuppo (George O. Petrie), return to the U.S. to meet Amber. Vinnie's mother initially disapproves of Amber, but they win her over and Vinnie and Amber become engaged. Wanting to ensure their matrimonial bliss is not disturbed, Don Aiuppo introduces Vinnie to the local Mafia commission and warns them against bothering his family. The return of Don Aiuppo to the U.S. causes a stir, and Aiuppo is shot and wounded.

=== Season 3 ===
==== Mafia Wars story line ====
Vinnie declares himself the temporary head of the local Mafia commission (to Frank McPike's delight) in order to find out who ordered the hit on Don Aiuppo at the end of season 2. The Mafia upheaval sparks off a rivalry between Albert Cericco (Robert Davi) and Joey Grosset (John Snyder), whose father-in-law was killed in another recent hit. Amber cannot handle the strain of Vinnie being in this prolonged danger, and breaks up with him.

Don Aiuppo bugs a payphone outside his hospital room, thinking that the various Mafiosi visiting him will be using it just after taking their leave; in this way he overhears Grosset mentioning he ordered the two hits, and Vinnie contacting Uncle Mike. He tells Cericco about Grosset's guilt; Cericco murders Grosset, and is arrested by OCB. From prison Cericco negotiates with Grosset's widow Gina (Anne De Salvo) and Vinnie for them to sell a large shipment of cocaine he smuggled to the Mafia commission. This allows Frank to arrest the entire commission. Vinnie belatedly deduces that Aiuppo manipulated him into bringing down the commission and orchestrated Cericco's murder of Grosset in order to exact revenge on both; he blames Cericco for the Mafia operation in which his son was inadvertently killed. An outraged Vinnie tells Aiuppo that he wants nothing more to do with him. Aiuppo is left heartbroken, having already been renounced by Vinnie's mother, who blames him for Vinnie becoming associated with the Mafia again.

==== Washington, D.C., story line ("The Capitol Conspiracy") ====
Vinnie is summoned to the Justice Department and put in charge of an investigation of Japanese yen counterfeiting. He is aware that he is being set up by the unscrupulous General Leland Masters (Norman Lloyd), who seeks payback for the shutdown of the Il Pavao operation, but plays along in hopes of collecting evidence against Masters. Masters aims to undermine the Japanese economy by printing large amounts of counterfeit yen and smuggling them into Japan on cargo aircraft. The author of the theory behind the conspiracy, Dr. Andrew Valenti, is murdered in what is made to look like a convenience store robbery, but the conspirators' cover is blown due to the assassin having used bullets loaded with curare. Vinnie is covertly photographed questioning reclusive millionaire Prescott Wilson (Ford Rainey), under whose name the theory was contracted. Wilson denies any involvement. When the counterfeit yen is seized en route, Vinnie and Wilson become the focus of an investigation, with the photos as incriminating evidence. Wilson delivers a string of insults against Masters in front of the investigating committee, which prompts Major Vernon Biggs (Stan Shaw) to confess to orchestrating the murder of Valenti at the orders of Admiral Walter Strichen (Stephen Joyce). Strichen then also starts insulting Masters, who loses his temper and shoots Strichen. Masters is arrested for murdering Strichen.

==== Lynchboro/Seattle story line ====
Vinnie is made a deputy of a small town called Lynchboro in Washington state, where the mining magnate Mark Volchek (Steve Ryan) runs the town like a dictatorship, hosts criminal operations such as a brothel, and has a curious obsession with the movie Mr. Sardonicus. Vinnie works under Sheriff Matthew Stemkowsky, nicknamed "Stem" (David Strathairn).

Recent murders, including several deputies, are determined to be the work of a serial killer, and a federal task force is sent to Lynchboro. Volchek, fearful of the disruption and attention, is determined to identify the killer through his knowledge of the town's residents. Volchek works with McPike to narrow down the suspects through a rapid series of deductions. Stem cracks under the intensifying pressure, confesses his crimes, and kills himself with a stun gun. Vinnie has flashbacks of Sonny Steelgrave's death and goes off the grid, calling in a favor from Roger Lococco. Lococco replaces Stem as sheriff and looks deeper into Volchek. He finds that despite his eccentricities, Volchek is a natural leader, beloved by the townspeople, and has a dream to build a hospital for Lynchboro focusing on cryogenics. Concluding that Lynchboro will be worse off if Volchek is removed, Lococco helps take down the official who Volchek planned to bribe for a hospital permit, but hides the bribe money so that there is no evidence against Volchek himself. However, Volchek becomes despondent at the failure to secure the permit. Lococco, Frank, and brothel worker Lacey (Darlanne Fluegel) re-enact part of Mr. Sardonicus with Volchek as Sardonicus, using the "merciful" ending in which he is cured, to help him recover.

Vinnie goes to Seattle, rents a room in a transient hotel, and takes a job with Health Elimination Services, which specializes in dumping medical waste. Vinnie discovers the job resulted in a hepatitis outbreak at a school, but his boss John Kousakis (Vincent Guastaferro) is unconcerned. Vinnie mails information on the illegal dumping to the health inspector, not knowing he is part of the same criminal organization as Kousakis. Vinnie kills two hired killers sent after him. Immediately consumed by remorse, he contemplates suicide but instead finds respite in a city church. After the pastor (Eddie Bracken) hears Vinnie's story, he holds a press conference at the church to expose the dumping. McPike and Kousakis find Vinnie there simultaneously. Kousakis's bullet misses Vinnie and wounds McPike. Frank is left comatose and doctors say there will probably be brain damage.

Kousakis hides out in the church belfry, but Vinnie stumbles upon him when he goes to repair the bells, acting on a religious intuition that they may wake Frank from his coma. Kousakis throws himself down the stairs and dies instantly. Frank is awakened by the church bells, but whether or not he is suffering from brain damage is left as an end-of-season cliffhanger.

=== Season 4 ===
After the third season ended, Ken Wahl left Wiseguy over a dispute with CBS over the direction of the show. Steven Bauer was brought in to be the new lead character, a disbarred United States Attorney named Michael Santana. Jonathan Banks and Jim Byrnes returned in their regular roles, and new addition Cecil Hoffman rounded out the cast. Latin style percussion and piano were dubbed onto the main theme. The series also found a new timeslot, moving to Saturday nights at 10:00 pm Eastern.

The fourth season was done as part of a realignment of CBS' prime time programming lineup that saw switches of other programming, along with some cancellations.

==== Guzman storyline ====
As the season begins, a now-bearded McPike has healed from the wounds he sustained the previous year, but Director Beckstead is looking to have him assume desk duty, believing he has lost his emotional objectivity with regard to Vinnie. Meanwhile, Lifeguard informs McPike that he has not heard from Vinnie in quite some time, leading McPike to pay a visit to his apartment.

Once there, Frank finds a somewhat normal scene. The TV is on in the living room, pasta is cooking on the stove in the kitchen, and the shower is running in the bathroom. However, nobody appears to be home. Investigating further, Frank notices that there is a white handprint on the apartment door, and comes to the conclusion that there had to be foul play involved; when he speaks to Lifeguard again, they both agree that Vinnie was abducted from his home.

Against the wishes of Beckstead, McPike sets off to try and locate Vinnie. His first stop is Vinnie's mother’s house, where Carlotta and Don Aiuppo inform Frank that one of their neighbors, a Jesuit, was murdered by the death squad Mano Blanca in El Salvador. and Vinnie was assisting the family in finding answers. Just before he disappeared, Vinnie made contact with Michael Santana, the United States Attorney for the Southern District of Florida who handled the case that established Vinnie's cover; Frank travels to Miami to try and make contact with Santana.

However, Santana has also found himself in trouble. He recently took down Cuban drug lord Jose Martinez-Gacha, but got the information he needed to arrest him through coercion. To further complicate matters, Santana also covered up his actions regarding the apprehending of the drug lord; when the cover up emerges, Santana is removed from his position and disbarred. After meeting with McPike, Santana initially denies knowing what Vinnie was up to.

Michael takes a job with AeroLib, an airplane company owned by Amado Guzman (Maximilian Schell), a Cuban-American who launders money for the Medellín Cartel using a pension fund in his bank El Banco de la Nueva Havana. Michael was building a case against Guzman when he was disbarred and suspects Vinnie's abductors took him out of country via AeroLib. With help from Michael's father Rafael (Manolo Villaverde), who runs AeroLib and idolizes Guzman due to his leadership in the opposition to Fidel Castro, all three of Vinnie's abductors are apprehended and a keepsake of Vinnie's is found on them, but they are murdered to prevent their implicating Guzman. Vinnie is presumed dead. McPike speaks at his memorial service, where he reveals the truth regarding Vinnie's services with the FBI and OCB.

Michael gains Guzman's trust by turning over his case files on him and informing him on a plot by his underlings to steal a shipment of gold from him. Guzman takes Michael into his bank operation and confides that the "gold" is actually gold-plated lead used as the front for his money laundering, and that he is exploiting his client by investing their money while he launders it. Michael tells Hillary Stein, his ex-girlfriend who was working as his AUSA before his disbarment but now manages Guzman's funds, to make some bad investments so that Guzman's client will reveal himself. The client, Martinez-Gacha, arrives in Miami demanding Guzman give him his money. Michael shows a photo of the meeting to Rafael, finally ending his faith in Guzman. Due to the bad investments, Guzman lacks the liquid assets to pay Martinez-Gacha, so he flees to El Salvador while Martinez-Gacha is arrested.

Not knowing of Michael's part in his downfall, Guzman has him brought to his location, and the FBI brings Guzman back to the U.S. However, the prosecutor drops all charges against Guzman in exchange for his testifying against Martinez-Gacha and revealing who ordered Vinnie's execution. Guzman's testimony is discredited because of the dropped charges against him, and Michael backs down from testifying when one of Martinez-Gacha's henchmen leads him to believe he is holding Michael's fiance Dahlia Mendez (Martika) hostage, though in actuality he already murdered her. However, Hillary's testimony is sufficient to convict Martinez-Gacha of all counts. Guzman is murdered by Mano Blanca, presumably because he identified the man who ordered Vinnie's death.

==== OCB disbands ====
With the Guzman investigation closed, McPike convinces Santana to become an official OCB agent. However, Director Beckstead is forced to shut down the task force due to budget cuts. Instead, McPike and Santana are sent to the New York FBI office to work in tandem with the U.S. Attorney's office there. They are immediately thrust into an investigation into a scheme involving the deaths of several naval pilots in crashes involving faulty plane parts. Former AUSA Stein, meanwhile, has joined her family's law firm and taken on the case, but after the firm's partners elect not to go after the partmaker she turns her attention to finding justice for the families affected by the crashes. Through the work of McPike and Santana, as well as the continued covert work from Lifeguard, the head of the company is arrested and brought to justice.

=== Cancellation ===
The fourth season of Wiseguy debuted in November 1990 to significantly lower ratings than it had achieved in the three prior seasons; this was attributed to the move to Saturdays, which typically was not a very highly rated night of television at the time. CBS announced that production would be indefinitely suspended after eleven episodes for the season had been produced; the eighth of these eleven episodes aired on December 8, 1990. After a two week hiatus, CBS announced that it was cancelling Wiseguy and removing it from the schedule immediately. The remaining three episodes never aired.

The program was never the strongest ratings draw, despite the positive feedback from critics. Discussing Wiseguy in retrospect, critic Matt Zoller Seitz said that the dense, long-form narrative which drew critical praise also kept the show from drawing a large viewership. The loss of Ken Wahl combined with the move to a traditionally low rated Saturday night spot depleted the ratings further.

Ken Wahl said that the entire fourth season concept was "ridiculous" because it got away from what Wiseguy had been about: Whereas before the show was more character driven, CBS wanted to make the show more of an action-based crime drama and Wahl felt he could not continue in the role if that was where they wanted to go.

=== Non-arc episodes ===
There were also several stand-alone episodes between the arcs, most of which dealt with the personal lives of the main characters. For instance:

==== "Last Rites for Lucci" ====
While Vinnie is recovering from observing Sonny Steelgrave's suicide, he learns of a contract on the life of a childhood friend who works at Brooklyn Borough Hall. Unable to get his friends at OCB to intervene, he takes matters into his own hands to bring the assassin down including asking help from a new friend he makes in a support group for previously "damaged" agents.

==== "Aria for Don Aiuppo" ====
Mama Carlotta Terranova falls for and marries an old flame, Rudy Aiuppo, whom she had formerly given up when he chose a life of crime. When the OCB come to arrest him at his wedding for being in the country illegally, Aiuppo switches places with his recently reconciled (and dead-ringer) brother, who is deported to Italy, while Aiuppo and Carlotta goes on their honeymoon.

==== "Stairway to Heaven" ====
Frank's wife Jenny is dying of liver failure, and cannot get a transplant due to her alcoholism. Frank uses money given to Vinnie by Roger in "Date with an Angel" to obtain an under-the-table liver transplant, saving her life. However, feeling that Frank was the cause of her drinking, she demands a separation, and Frank temporarily moves in with Vinnie.

==== "White Noise" ====
Vinnie has his broken leg from the beginning of the Garment Center storyline healed in a local hospital, where disgraced former OCB chief Daryl Elias (John M. Jackson) is in the mental ward. Elias edits Vinnie's status for being there into that of a violently unstable patient into hospital records. Vinnie is committed when he tries to check out after his physical exam. Through a series of hallucinations of Sonny Steelgrave, Vinnie resolves his guilt issues, retains his sanity and brings Elias and the hospital's mental ward staff down for committing him..

==== "Call it Casaba" ====
Vinnie, Frank, and Lifeguard go on a camping weekend, but Lifeguard has his daughter's marriage on his mind. This is not helped when the daughter shows up at his cabin. This episode is a fan favorite, and was especially a favorite of co-star Jonathan Banks.

==== "Sleepwalk" ====
After the "Mafia Wars" arc, Vinnie tries to patch things up with Amber Twine. At the suggestion of a psychiatrist, they practice chastity while staying at Lifeguard's cabin. However, even in this context Amber cannot give up the music business, and Vinnie realizes that he in turn cannot give up being an undercover agent, so they amicably break up again. This sequence features a cameo by blues harp player Kim Wilson and his band, The Fabulous Thunderbirds.

==== "How Will They Remember Me?" ====
Vinnie discovers his late father's diary and sees his father (also played by Ken Wahl) faced the same temptations from criminals that Vinnie faces. This episode does not feature Frank McPike, due to the episode mostly taking place in flashbacks. The flashbacks are all in black-and-white.

==== "People Do It All the Time" ====
Lifeguard's family troubles continue as he comes to grips with becoming a grandfather. He steps in when his son-in-law takes a job with an unscrupulous construction company.

==== "The Reunion" ====
Vinnie attends his high school reunion, where he is reunited with an old flame, Denise Denelli (Cathy Moriarty), who now works for the NYPD, and Mike "Mooch" Cacciatore (Tony Ganios), the defense attorney from the Garment Trade arc and Vinnie's high school buddy. When Frank informs Vinnie that Denise has bugged his house because of his Mafia association, Vinnie is enraged at her betrayal of their friendship and hatches a revenge scheme. Denise and Mooch are nearly killed in the resulting misadventure, and end up marrying each other.

==== "Meet Mike McPike" ====
Frank has family problems when his father, Mike McPike, gets thrown out of yet another nursing home. Frank takes him in temporarily, but once Mike realizes Frank no longer lives with his family, he becomes determined to get Frank and Jenny back together.

==== "To Die in Bettendorf" ====
Sid Royce (Dennis Lipscomb), Patrice's Harvard-educated accountant, and his wife Allison have been in a witness protection program since Sid turned state's evidence following the murder of Patrice, with Sid working as a shoe salesman named "Elvis Prim" in Bettendorf, Iowa. Allison cannot stand this lifestyle any longer and leaves Sid with a man in a truck, causing Sid to have a mental breakdown. Sid tracks down Frank just as Frank and Jenny return from their first date since the separation, and uses Jenny as a hostage. Frank kills Sid to save Jenny (Vinnie offers to do the deed, but Frank turns him down).

==== "Romp" ====
Vinnie and Mooch attend the bachelor party of their friend Jimmy Vitale, and loan Jimmy the money to get out from under a loan shark's thumb.

== Main characters ==
=== Vincent Terranova ===
Vincent Michael "Vinnie" Terranova (Ken Wahl) is an undercover agent who is 30 years old when the series begins. His job is to infiltrate criminal organizations, gather evidence, and then destroy the organization to bring the guilty parties to justice. At the beginning of the series, he is estranged from his family because of an eighteen-month prison sentence (meant to establish his "wiseguy" credentials with the criminal underworld) and continued ties to criminals, and OCB regulations forbade Vinnie from telling his family the truth. However, his brother Peter (Gerald Anthony), a Catholic priest, knew the truth (Vinnie had revealed everything under the seal of the confessional), and in the first season episode "Prodigal Son" when his Italian-born mother Carlotta (Elsa Raven) is hospitalized after being mugged, Vinnie reveals the truth to her (with McPike and Lifeguard concealing Vinnie's confession from the OCB Regional Director), thereby reconciling mother and son. Carlotta calls him "Vincenzo" but his legal name is Vincent. Vinnie was often seen wearing Fordham University sweatshirts and hats as he and Peter are Fordham graduates.

=== Frank McPike ===
Frank McPike (Jonathan Banks) is Vinnie's superior officer, who assigns Vinnie to cases, supplies him with important information and coordinates backup support. He became OCB Regional Director (RD) and Vinnie's immediate superior after Vinnie was released after completing an eighteen-month sentence in the Newark State Penitentiary (Frank was responsible for ensuring that Vinnie served the full term in order to cement his cover). Since McPike is a known law enforcement official and Vinnie is deep undercover, McPike will often have Vinnie arrested on a trumped-up charge so that he can talk to Vinnie without revealing his identity. Frank has a troubled marriage. He separates from his wife after diverting some money recovered from a gangster to pay for a liver transplant for her.

=== Daniel Benjamin "Lifeguard" Burroughs ===
Lifeguard (Jim Byrnes), with whom Vinnie communicates almost exclusively by telephone, is Vinnie's other contact person. Vinnie (ideally) calls him every morning with the latest updates on the case, and Lifeguard provides him with quick updates. He also, under the name of "Mike Terranova", provides Vinnie with an emergency contact number (555-4958, a play on Vince's agent number), without revealing Vinnie's true identity. (The cover location is "Sailor Hardware"; the code phrase "Uncle Mike" indicates an emergency request for assistance.) Daniel is a double-leg amputee who uses a wheelchair, and on occasion prosthetic legs. Like McPike, Daniel is divorced as a result of his work; his ex-wife stays in close contact, apparently because Daniel has resources she wants, and Daniel endures this with resentment. Eventually he forms a relationship with OCB's West Coast Lifeguard operator when Vinnie's investigations take him to Washington State.

=== Michael Santana ===
Appearing only in season 4 as the focal character in Terranova's absence, Michael Santana (Steven Bauer) is a recently disbarred United States Attorney who becomes allies with McPike and the OCB.

=== Hillary Stein ===
Appearing only in season 4, Hillary Stein (Cecil Hoffman) is Santana's fellow U.S. Attorney and love interest.

== Production ==
=== Conception and writing ===
The series was created by Stephen J. Cannell and Frank Lupo, who had previously co-created The A-Team, Riptide, and Hunter. Though Joseph D. Pistone's book Donnie Brasco: My Undercover Life in the Mafia is sometimes cited as an inspiration for the series, it was not published until 1988, when the series premiered in September 1987.

David J. Burke was the supervising producer and showrunner for the first three seasons. Peter Lance was the showrunner for the fourth season.

=== Filming locations ===
The first three seasons of Wiseguy were shot in and around Vancouver, British Columbia. It was one of the first American television shows (concurrent to 21 Jump Street, also produced by Stephen J. Cannell) that embraced filming in "Hollywood North" to exploit lower production costs. North Shore Studios in North Vancouver, originally constructed for the filming 21 Jump Street, was the home of the series for much of its run.

Following the fourth season retool, filming moved to Miami, Florida.

== Episodes ==
=== Series overview ===
Season	Episodes	Originally released	
Season	Episodes	First released	Last released
1	22	September 16, 1987	March 28, 1988
2	22	October 26, 1988	May 24, 1989
3	22	September 20, 1989	April 18, 1990
4	9	November 10, 1990	December 8, 1990

=== Season 1 (1987–88) ===
No. overall	No. in season	Title	Directed by	Written by	Original release date	Rating/share (households)
Sonny Steelgrave Storyline
1	1	"Pilot"	Rod Holcomb	Stephen J. Cannell & Frank Lupo	September 16, 1987	15.8/27
2	2	"Pilot"	Rod Holcomb	Stephen J. Cannell & Frank Lupo	September 16, 1987	15.8/27
3	3	"New Blood"	Lyndon Chubbuck	David J. Burke	September 24, 1987	12.1/19
4	4	"The Loose Cannon"	Larry Shaw	Stephen J. Cannell	October 1, 1987	11.5/18
5	5	"The Birthday Surprise"	Robert Iscove	S : Gene Miller; S/T : Eric Blakeney	October 8, 1987	13.8/22
6	6	"One on One"	Reynaldo Villalobos	Stephen Kronish	October 15, 1987	11.9/19
7	7	"The Prodigal Son"	Charles Correll	Carol Mendelsohn	October 22, 1987	11.6/18
8	8	"A Deal's a Deal"	Charles Correll	David J. Burke & Stephen Kronish	October 29, 1987	10.7/16
9	9	"The Marriage of Heaven and Hell"	Zale Dalen	Eric Blakeney	November 5, 1987	10.3/16
10	10	"No One Gets Out of Here Alive"	Robert Iscove	David J. Burke	November 12, 1987	11.7/18
Non-arc Episode
11	11	"Last Rites for Lucci"	Bill Corcoran	Stephen Kronish	November 19, 1987	11.6/18
Mel Profitt Storyline
12	12	"Independent Operator"	Aaron Lipstadt	Stephen J. Cannell	January 4, 1988	11.1/18
13	13	"Fascination for the Flame"	William A. Fraker	Stephen J. Cannell	January 11, 1988	12.3/21
14	14	"Smokey Mountain Requiem"	Neill Fearnley	S : Hans Tobeason; S/T : David J. Burke	January 18, 1988	12.7/22
15	15	"Player to Be Named Now"	Don Rapiel	Stephen Kronish	January 25, 1988	10.0/18
16	16	"The Merchant of Death"	William A. Fraker	Carol Mendelsohn	February 1, 1988	11.1/19
17	17	"Not for Nothing"	Bill Corcoran	David J. Burke & Don Kurt	February 8, 1988	11.7/19
18	18	"Squeeze"	Bill Corcoran	Gina Wendkos	February 15, 1988	11.4/19
19	19	"Blood Dance"	Kim Manners	Eric Blakeney	February 22, 1988	11.5/18
20	20	"Phantom Pain"	Dennis Dugan	Stephen Kronish	March 14, 1988	10.1/17
21	21	"Dirty Little Wars"	Robert Iscove	David J. Burke	March 21, 1988	10.5/18
22	22	"Date with an Angel"	Les Sheldon	David J. Burke & Stephen Kronish	March 28, 1988	10.1/17

=== Season 2 (1988–89) ===
No. overall	No. in season	Title	Directed by	Written by	Original release date	Viewers (millions)
White Supremacy Storyline
23	1	"Going Home"	Les Sheldon	David J. Burke	October 26, 1988	18.9
24	2	"School of Hard Knox"	Robert Iscove	Stephen Kronish	November 2, 1988	18.7
25	3	"Revenge of the Mud People"	Bill Corcoran	Stephen J. Cannell	November 9, 1988	17.0
26	4	"Last of the True Believers"	Robert Iscove	John Schulian	November 16, 1988	16.2
Non-arc Episode
27	5	"Aria for Don Aiuppo"	Jan Eliasberg	Alfonse Ruggiero, Jr.	December 7, 1988	16.3
Garment Trade Storyline
28	6	"7th Avenue Freeze Out"	Bill Corcoran	David J. Burke & Stephen Kronish	December 14, 1988	19.7
29	7	"Next of Kin"	Bill Corcoran	Alfonse Ruggiero, Jr. & John Schulian	December 21, 1988	19.0
30	8	"All or Nothing"	Gus Trikonis	Suzanne Oshry	January 11, 1989	17.3
31	9	"Where's the Money?"	Robert Iscove	David J. Burke & Alfonse Ruggiero, Jr.	January 18, 1989	20.2
32	10	"Postcard from Morocco"	Roy Campanella II	Stephen Kronish & John Schulian	January 25, 1989	16.9
Non-arc Episodes
33	11	"Stairway to Heaven"	James A. Contner	Alfonse Ruggiero, Jr.	February 1, 1989	16.8
34	12	"White Noise"	James Whitmore Jr.	S : Ken Wahl; T : David J. Burke & Alfonse Ruggiero, Jr.	February 15, 1989	17.2
Dead Dog Records Storyline
35	13	"Dead Dog Lives"	Gus Trikonis	David J. Burke & Stephen Kronish	March 1, 1989	15.6
36	14	"And It Comes Out Here"	Bill Corcoran	David J. Burke & Stephen Kronish	March 8, 1989	19.1
37	15	"The Rip-Off Stick"	Mario Azzopardi	Alfonse Ruggiero, Jr. & John Schulian	March 22, 1989	17.9
38	16	"High Dollar Bop"	Douglas Jackson	Alfonse Ruggiero, Jr. & John Schulian	April 5, 1989	16.7
39	17	"Hip Hop on the Gravy Train"	Helaine Head	Suzanne Oshry	April 12, 1989	18.3
40	18	"The One That Got Away"	Jorge Montesi	David J. Burke & Alfonse Ruggiero, Jr.	May 3, 1989	16.5
41	19	"Living and Dying in 4/4 Time"	James A. Contner	Stephen Kronish & John Schulian	May 10, 1989	15.5
Non-arc Episode
42	20	"Call It Casaba"	Gus Trikonis	David J. Burke & Clifton Campbell & Alfonse Ruggiero, Jr.	May 17, 1989	17.0
Le Lacrime d'Amore
43	21	"Le Lacrime d'Amore, Part 1: A.K.A. The Four-Letter Word"	Frank E. Johnson	John Schulian & Suzanne Oshry	May 24, 1989	14.1
44	22	"Le Lacrime d'Amore, Part 2: A.K.A. There's Plenty of Time"	Bill Corcoran	Alfonse Ruggiero, Jr. & Clifton Campbell	May 24, 1989	14.1

=== Season 3 (1989–90) ===
No. overall	No. in season	Title	Directed by	Written by	Original release date	Viewers (millions)
Mafia Wars Storyline
45	1	"A Rightful Place"	Robert Iscove	David J. Burke	September 20, 1989	16.5
46	2	"Battle of the Barge"	Robert Iscove	Clifton Campbell	September 27, 1989	17.0
47	3	"Sins of the Father"	David J. Burke	Stephen Kronish	October 4, 1989	15.0
48	4	"Heir to the Throne"	Bill Corcoran	Alphonse Ruggiero, Jr.	October 11, 1989	15.5
Non-arc Episodes
49	5	"Sleepwalk"	Matthew Meshekoff	David J. Burke & Clifton Campbell	October 25, 1989	16.5
50	6	"How Will They Remember Me?"	William A. Fraker	S : Ken Wahl & David J. Burke; S/T : Stephen Kronish & Alfonse Ruggiero, Jr.	November 1, 1989	14.6
51	7	"People Do It All the Time"	Jonathan Sanger	S : David Braden & David Curran; T : Suzanne Oshry	November 8, 1989	13.6
52	8	"The Reunion"	William A. Fraker	S : Don Kurt; T : David J. Burke & Alfonse Ruggiero, Jr.	November 15, 1989	16.1
Washington, D.C. Storyline ("The Capitol Conspiracy")
53	9	"Day One"	Mario Van Peebles	David J. Burke & Stephen Kronish & Alfonse Ruggiero, Jr. & Clifton Campbell	November 29, 1989	13.9
54	10	"Day Four"	Reynaldo Villalobos	David J. Burke & Stephen Kronish & Alfonse Ruggiero, Jr. & Clifton Campbell	December 6, 1989	14.5
55	11	"Day Seven"	William A. Fraker	David J. Burke & Stephen Kronish & Alfonse Ruggiero, Jr. & Clifton Campbell	December 13, 1989	15.3
56	12	"Day Nine"	Les Sheldon	David J. Burke & Stephen Kronish & Alfonse Ruggiero, Jr. & Clifton Campbell	December 20, 1989	15.8
Non-arc Episodes
57	13	"Meet Mike McPike"	Robert Woodruff	Frank Megna	January 10, 1990	14.7
58	14	"To Die in Bettendorf"	Jorge Montesi	Morgan Gendel	January 17, 1990	14.8
59	15	"Romp"	Ken Wahl	Davey Lovejoy	February 7, 1990	13.4
Lynchboro/Seattle Storyline
60	16	"A One Horse Town"	Peter D. Marshall	David J. Burke	February 14, 1990	15.9
61	17	"His Master's Voice"	James A. Contner	Robert Engels	March 7, 1990	14.1
62	18	"Hello Buckwheat"	Jonathan Sanger	David J. Burke & Stephen Kronish	March 14, 1990	12.2
63	19	"Let Them Eat Cake"	James A. Contner	Clifton Campbell & Robert Engels	March 21, 1990	12.8
64	20	"Meltdown"	Frank E. Johnson	Clifton Campbell & Stephen Kronish	March 28, 1990	12.6
65	21	"Sanctuary"	William A. Fraker	David J. Burke & Robert Engels	April 11, 1990	13.5
66	22	"Brrump-Bump"	Peter D. Marshall	Robert Engels	April 18, 1990	14.1

=== Season 4 (1990) ===
No. overall	No. in season	Title	Directed by	Written by	Original release date	Viewers (millions)
Guzman Storyline
67	1	"Fruit of the Poisonous Tree"	Jan Eliasberg	S : Stephen J. Cannell & Rafael Lima; S/T : Peter Lance	November 10, 1990	10.0
68	2	"Fruit of the Poisonous Tree"	Jan Eliasberg	S : Stephen J. Cannell & Rafael Lima; S/T : Peter Lance	November 10, 1990	10.0
69	3	"Black Gold"	Jorge Montesi	S : Stephen J. Cannell & Peter Lance & Rafael Lima; T : Bill Bludworth	November 17, 1990	8.5
70	4	"The Gift"	Jorge Montesi	Stephen J. Cannell	November 24, 1990	10.2
71	5	"La Mina"	Colin Bucksey	Peter Lance	December 1, 1990	8.5
72	6	"Witness Protection for the Archangel Lucifer"	Jorge Montesi	Rafael Lima	December 8, 1990	9.5
OCB Disbands Storyline
73	7	"Point of No Return"	Colin Bucksey	Brock Choy	Unaired	N/A
74	8	"Dead Right"	Tucker Gates	James Kearns	Unaired	N/A
75	9	"Changing Houses"	Gus Trikonis	Stephen J. Cannell	Unaired	N/A

== 1996 Follow Up TV film ==
In 1996, ABC commissioned a reunion film with the possibility of a revival series in the works. Ken Wahl, Jonathan Banks, and Jim Byrnes all reprised their roles.

In order to explain the disappearance of Vinnie, a story was devised which effectively retconned the series and disregarded the events of season four. Following his desertion after witnessing Stem's suicide during the Volchek case in Washington state, as well as his problems with his stepfather, the FBI pulled Vinnie out of OCB and reassigned him to a wiretapping detail where he was still working at the time the film began.

Vinnie is ordered to infiltrate the organization of criminal boss Paul Callendar (Ted Levine). The movie had many of the same themes as the TV show, including Vinnie's constant conflict in betraying the people he had grown to care about.

Under the title of Wiseguy, the TV movie premiered on May 2, 1996. While the movie was a critical success, ABC aired it against NBC's Thursday night Must See TV lineup and it failed to draw many viewers. In addition, Wahl suffered a broken neck in 1992 in a fall that left him temporarily quadriplegic and by the time the Wiseguy reunion was commissioned, he had been in near constant pain after he regained the use of his arms and legs and would likely not have been physically capable to take on the demands of the role. Thus, the movie was the last time the original Wiseguy cast appeared in their roles. The movie was rerun on Sleuth in 2008.

While never released on VHS or DVD in the United States, the movie was released overseas on Video CD (MagnaVision CW071-003001) but is no longer commercially available.

== Home media/streaming/rebroadcast ==
In May 2009, Mill Creek Entertainment announced that they had acquired the rights to release Wiseguy on DVD in Region 1. They subsequently released the complete first season on August 25, 2009. On March 9, 2010, Mill Creek released Wiseguy: The Collector's Edition, a 13-disc set featuring 67 episodes from all four seasons. However, due to rights issues with the music contained in the show, the "Dead Dog Records" arc from Season 2 (seven of 22 episodes) is not included.

Beyond Home Entertainment has released all four seasons on DVD in Region 4, again without the "Dead Dog Records" arc episodes.

On August 12, 2022, Visual Entertainment released Wiseguy: The Complete Collection, a 14-disc set that features, for the first time on DVD, all 75 episodes of the series.

Home media releases of Wiseguy
DVD name	No. ep.	Release dates	
DVD name	No. ep.	Region 1	Region 4
Season 1	22	August 25, 2009	December 1, 2008
Season 2	14*	—N/a	March 4, 2009
Season 3	22	—N/a	July 8, 2009
Season 4	9	—N/a	September 9, 2009
Complete Series	75	August 12, 2022	—N/a

*Omits the seven-episode "Dead Dog Records" arc

The first season became available on iTunes on April 28, 2008.

As of 2022, the series, except the "Dead Dog Records" arc, is available on Peacock and Tubi including "Dead Dog Records" but not Season 4. Other streaming options include: Roku, Pluto, FILMRISE, freevee, and Amazon Prime.

As of 2022, the series is being rebroadcast on Circle and Ace TV. Circle is showing all 75 episodes, including the episodes in the "Dead Dog Records" arc. As of 2023, the series is being rebroadcast on Retro TV, also including the episodes in the "Dead Dog Records" arc.

== Reception ==
=== Critical response ===
Wiseguy has been cited alongside its contemporary Crime Story as breaking ground for the lengthy crime stories which thrived on television during the late 1990s and early 2000s.

In 1997 TV Guide ranked the episode "Blood Dance" number 14 on its "100 Greatest Episodes of All Time" list.

A 2008 Entertainment Weekly retrospective on "The 50 Biggest Emmy Snubs" (TV shows and performances regarded by the publication as deserving Emmy Awards which did not receive them) ranked Ray Sharkey in the role of Sonny Steelgrave as #26 and Kevin Spacey in the role of Mel Profitt as #44.

=== Awards and nominations ===
Institution	Year	Category	Recipient(s)	Episode(s)	Result	Ref.
American Society of Cinematographers	1990	Outstanding Achievement in Cinematography in Regular Series	Frank E. Johnson	"How Will They Remember Me?"	Nominated	
Casting Society of America	1988	Best Casting for TV, Dramatic Episodic	Victoria Burrows, Vicki Huff	—N/a	Nominated	
Casting Society of America	1989	Best Casting for TV, Dramatic Episodic	Vicki Huff	—N/a	Won	
Edgar Award	1988	Best Television Episode	Eric Blakeney	"The Marriage Of Heaven And Hell"	Nominated	
Edgar Award	1989	Best Television Episode	David J. Burke, Stephen Kronish	"Date with an Angel"	Nominated	
Edgar Award	1990	Best Television Episode	David J. Burke, Alfonse Ruggiero	"White Noise"	Won	
Golden Globe Awards	1989	Best Television Series – Drama	—N/a	—N/a	Nominated	
Golden Globe Awards	1989	Best Actor – Television Series Drama	Ken Wahl	—N/a	Nominated	
Golden Globe Awards	1990	Best Television Series – Drama	—N/a	—N/a	Nominated	
Golden Globe Awards	1990	Best Actor – Television Series Drama	Ken Wahl	—N/a	Won	
Primetime Emmy Awards	1988	Outstanding Sound Editing for a Comedy or Drama Series (One-Hour)	Gary Winter, William Jacobs, John M. Colwell, Ray Alba, Jim Siracusa, Michael O'Corrigan, William Hooper, Bill Young, Robert Gutknecht, Joe Divitale, John Kaufman, Thomas McMullen, John Kline, Cliff Bell Jr., John Caper Jr.	"Pilot"	Nominated	
Primetime Emmy Awards	1989	Outstanding Drama Series	Stephen J. Cannell, Les Sheldon, Jo Swerling Jr., David J. Burke, Stephen Kronish, Alfonse Ruggiero Jr., Alex Beaton	—N/a	Nominated	
Primetime Emmy Awards	1989	Outstanding Lead Actor in a Drama Series	Ken Wahl	—N/a	Nominated	
Primetime Emmy Awards	1989	Outstanding Supporting Actor in a Drama Series	Jonathan Banks	—N/a	Nominated	
Primetime Emmy Awards	1989	Outstanding Picture Editing for a Drama Series	Larry Strong, Ron Spang	"White Noise"	Nominated	
Primetime Emmy Awards	1989	Outstanding Sound Editing for a Comedy or Drama Series (One-Hour)	Robert Gutknecht, John Kaufman, William Hooper, Bill Young, Edward L. Sandlin, Roxanne Jones	"All or Nothing"	Nominated	
Primetime Emmy Awards	1990	Outstanding Sound Editing for a Comedy or Drama Series (One-Hour)	Robert Gutknecht, Bill Young, William Hooper, Edward L. Sandlin, Richard LeGrand Jr., John Kaufman, Paul Wittenberg, Jeff Charbonneau	"Heir To The Throne"	Nominated	
Saturn Awards	2004	Best DVD Television Release	—N/a	"Pilot"	Won	
Viewers for Quality Television	1988	Founder's Award	Ray Sharkey	—N/a	Won	
Viewers for Quality Television	1989	Best Quality Drama Series	—N/a	—N/a	Nominated	
Viewers for Quality Television	1990	Best Quality Drama Series	—N/a	—N/a	Nominated	
Viewers for Quality Television	1990	Best Actor in a Quality Drama Series	Ken Wahl	—N/a	Nominated	
Viewers for Quality Television	1990	Best Supporting Actor in a Quality Drama Series	Jonathan Banks	—N/a	Nominated	
