= The Monroes (1995 TV series) =

1995 TV series

- Genre: Soap opera
- Created by: Rick Kellard
- Starring: William Devane; Cecil Hoffman; Steven Eckholdt; Tracy Griffith; Susan Sullivan; David Andrews; Lynn Clark
- Composer: W.G. Snuffy Walden
- Country of origin: United States
- Original language: English
- No. of seasons: 1
- No. of episodes: 13 (7 unaired)

Production
- Running time: 60 minutes
- Production companies: Rebel Heart Productions; Elliot Friedgen Company; Warner Bros. Television

Original release
- Network: ABC
- Release: September 12 – October 19, 1995

The Monroes is a primetime soap opera starring William Devane and Susan Sullivan, that ran from September 12, 1995 to October 19, 1995 on ABC. The Monroes capitalizes on the rise of high drama in politics.

The entire series was aired on SOAPnet in the Spring of 2005.

== Cast ==
- William Devane as John Monroe, a powerful and wealthy power broker who is running for governor of Maryland
- Susan Sullivan as Kathryn Monroe, the smart and long-suffering matriarch
- David Andrews as Congressman William “Billy” Monroe, the eldest son who is politically ambitious but keeps stumbling into extramarital affairs
- Steven Eckholdt as James Monroe, John's favorite son, a former astronaut, despises politics and his father's plays
- Cecil Hoffman as Greer Monroe, a cold-blooded and intelligent attorney who is having an affair with a Washington, D.C. figure who, for the time being, is not revealed but who may just turn out to be the President of the United States
- Darryl Theirse as Michael Bradley
- Tracy Griffith as Ruby Monroe, a photographer and newlywed already on the brink of ending her marriage
- Tristan Tait as Gabriel Monroe
- Lynn Clark as Anne Monroe, Billy’s suffering wife

== Reception ==
From the start, the show faced stiff competition against Seinfeld and was not expected to fare well. In Variety, Brian Lowry wrote:

[The] show’s chances appear contingent on patience and modest expectations. Even so, look for this serialized drama about a high-powered political family to have a tough time winning a second term.

In Entertainment Weekly, critic Ken Tucker wrote:

John’s wife, Kathryn, played with icy devilishness by Susan Sullivan, is both smart and long-suffering. And, of course, it doesn’t take long for a mistress of John’s to pop up and utter the line ”Your husband has an enormous appetite for conquest of all kinds.” Most of The Monroes is as stiff as that snippet of dialogue, but Devane and Sullivan have obvious fun as would-be power brokers, and anyone who wishes Dynasty were still on may find this potboiler amusing.

== Episodes ==
No.	Title	Directed by	Written by	Original release date
1	"Pilot"	Rick Wallace	Rick Kellard	September 12, 1995
2	"Triple Cross"	Vern Gillum	Unknown	September 21, 1995
3	"Educating Billy"	Michael Nankin	Unknown	September 28, 1995
4	"Emission Control"	Vern Gillum	Unknown	October 5, 1995
5	"Bottom's Up"	Michael W. Watkins	Dave Alan Johnson	October 19, 1995
6	"Rites of Passage"	Michael Pavone	TBD	Unaired
7	"Father Knows Best"	James Quinn	Gary R. Johnson	Unaired
8	"The Monroe Victory Tour"	Alan J. Levi	TBD	Unaired
9	"Like Father, Like Son"	TBD	Dave Alan Johnson; Michael Pavone	Unaired
