= Purple Hearts (1984 film) =

1984 American film by Sidney J. Furie

- Theatrical release poster
- Directed by: Sidney J. Furie
- Written by: Sidney J. Furie; Rick Natkin
- Produced by: Sidney J. Furie; Rick Natkin; Lope V. Juban, Jr.
- Starring: Ken Wahl; Cheryl Ladd
- Cinematography: Jan Kiesser
- Edited by: George Grenville
- Music by: Robert Folk
- Production company: The Ladd Company
- Distributed by: Warner Bros.
- Release date: March 30, 1984
- Running time: 116 minutes
- Country: United States
- Language: English
- Budget: $2.8 million
- Box office: US$2,075,282

Purple Hearts is a 1984 war film directed by Sidney J. Furie and starring Ken Wahl and Cheryl Ladd. The screenplay concerns a Navy surgeon and a Navy nurse who fall in love while serving in Vietnam during the war. Their affection for one another provides a striking contrast to the violence of warfare.

== Cast ==
- Ken Wahl as Don Jardian
- Cheryl Ladd as Deborah Solomon
- Stephen Lee as "Wizard"
- Annie McEnroe as Hallaway
- Paul McCrane as Brenner
- Cyril O'Reilly as Zuma
- David Harris as Hanes
- Hillary Bailey as Jill
- R. Lee Ermey as Gunnery Sergeant "Gunny"
- Drew Snyder as Lieutenant Colonel Larimore
- Lane Smith as Commander Markel
- James Whitmore Jr. as Bwana
- Kevin Elders as CIA Driver
- Sydney Squire as Nurse
- David Bass as Lieutenant Grayson
- Rudy Nash as Hartman

== Production ==
Despite having made a Vietnam War movie with The Boys in Company C, director Sidney J. Furie felt he had more to say about the war and wanted to explore romance and the "hunger for intimacy" in the setting. Reteaming with The Boys in Company C co-writer Rick Natkin, Furie delivered the script to The Ladd Company who while enthusiastic about the script voiced concerns over the budget of a war film, which were abated after Furie worked out a relatively modest $2.8 million budget using his experience from The Boys in Company C. Furie wrote the script with Ken Wahl in mind for Don Jardian who accepted the role immediately upon receiving the script. Over a hundred actresses auditioned for the part of Deborah Solomon, until Cheryl Ladd was suggested, leading Furie to hire her on the spot following a cold reading.

== Reception ==
Purple Hearts currently holds a 20% approval rating on Rotten Tomatoes from 5 reviews. Common points of criticism described a lack of chemistry between Wahl and Ladd, or too much of a reliance on coincidence and convenience in the plotting.

In his review for the Chicago Sun-Times, Roger Ebert awarded the film half a star, writing, "This isn't war, this is bad plotting. And this isn't romance, it's soap opera."

In her review for The New York Times, Janet Maslin wrote Purple Hearts had "an ending so contrived it may make your teeth ache."
