= Bess Motta =

American actress

- Years active: 1980–2017

Bess Motta is an American actress, singer, choreographer, and exercise demonstrator who appeared in the Canadian produced television series 20 Minute Workout, which aired for two seasons in 1983 and 1984.

== Biography ==
Motta taught aerobics at Brentwood Fitness Center, and in 1980 she starred in a musical in England. She has been credited with putting TV aerobics on the map, and has been called the "Aerobics queen of the 1980s", having become a fitness advocate after returning from England 30 pounds overweight.

She had a small role in The Terminator, playing Linda Hamilton's roommate, Ginger, in 1984. She played Rita, a friendly and bubbly waitress in a mansion's kitchen, on the syndicated show New Monkees in 1987. She also appeared in the first few seasons of The Home Show.

Motta gave an interview to The Terminator Fans website in August 2010 in which she confirms that she has attended the occasional ComicCon event (Burbank and Chicago in 2010).

On December 3, 2014 Motta appeared on Ken Reid's TV Guidance Counselor Podcast.
