= NYPD Blue season 11 =

Season of television series

NYPD Blue
- Season 11
- Season 11 U.S. DVD cover
- No. of episodes: 22

Release
- Original network: ABC
- Original release: September 23, 2003 – May 11, 2004

Season chronology
- ← Previous; Season 10 Next → Season 12

The eleventh season of NYPD Blue premiered on ABC on September 23, 2003, and concluded on May 11, 2004.

Actor	Character	Main cast	Recurring cast
Dennis Franz	Andy Sipowicz	entire season	—N/a
Mark-Paul Gosselaar	John Clark Jr.	entire season	—N/a
Gordon Clapp	Greg Medavoy	entire season	—N/a
Henry Simmons	Baldwin Jones	entire season	—N/a
Charlotte Ross	Connie McDowell	episodes 1–14	—N/a
Garcelle Beauvais	Valerie Haywood	entire season	—N/a
Jacqueline Obradors	Rita Ortiz	entire season	—N/a
Bill Brochtrup	John Irvin	entire season	—N/a
Esai Morales	Tony Rodriguez	episodes 1–13	—N/a
John F. O'Donohue	Eddie Gibson	episodes 14–22	episode 13
Kim Delaney	Diane Russell	—N/a	episodes 5–8
Jessalyn Gilsig	Kelly Ronson	—N/a	episodes 18–22

== Episodes ==
No. overall	No. in season	Title	Directed by	Written by	Original release date	Prod. code	U.S. viewers (millions)
220	1	"Frickin’ Fraker"	Mark Tinker	Story by : Bill Clark & Keith Eisner; Teleplay by : Keith Eisner	September 23, 2003	IA01/5101	10.24
The brother of a convicted child molester is murdered and the case opens up the scars of his previous actions, and the cops of the 15th Precinct testify against Captain Fraker for his attempted murder of Tony Rodriguez.
221	2	"Your Bus, Ted"	Mark Piznarski	Story by : Bill Clark & Tom Szentgyörgyi; Teleplay by : Tom Szentgyörgyi	September 30, 2003	IA02/5102	10.43
A transvestite is murdered, a surgeon colleague of Dr. Devlin claims he was slashed outside a hospital, and Rodriguez takes the stand in Captain Fraker's trial. Notes: Kelly Mantle guest stars as Dan 'Monika' Hoffnagle
222	3	"Shear Stupidity"	Tawnia McKiernan	Story by : Bill Clark & Bonnie Mark; Teleplay by : Bonnie Mark	October 7, 2003	IA03/5103	9.29
Sipowicz and Clark find that two cases (a barber's severe beating and the disappearance of a family man) are connected, and testimony at Fraker's trial threatens Rodriguez's career. Notes: Daniel Benzali guest stars as Sinclair and Vanessa Marcil guest stars as Detective Maria Olivera
223	4	"Porn Free"	Dennis Dugan	Story by : Bill Clark & Greg Plageman; Teleplay by : Greg Plageman	October 14, 2003	IA04/5104	9.76
A verdict is reached in Fraker's trial, a body is found by the river, and a middle-class housewife with an erotic past is found dead in a vacant lot. Notes: Daniel Benzali's last appearance as James Sinclair
224	5	"Keeping Abreast"	Jesse Bochco	Story by : Bill Clark & Matt Olmstead; Teleplay by : Matt Olmstead	October 21, 2003	IA05/5105	10.86
Diane Russell helps the detectives of the 15th Precinct track a serial killer who targets women at an upscale bar, and Jones attempts to keep a violent father from harming his son.: Note - Kim Delaney returns for four episodes as Diane Russell
225	6	"Andy Appleseed"	Jake Paltrow	Story by : Bill Clark & Nicholas Wootton; Teleplay by : Nicholas Wootton	October 28, 2003	IA06/5106	10.93
Another young woman falls prey to a serial killer whose victims all patronize the same trendy bar; when an abusive mother is found murdered, her children are suspects. Jennifer Devlin comes clean about some issues. Connie gets some surprising news. Notes: Nick Offerman guest stars as Steven Debrees
226	7	"It’s to Die For"	Ed Begley, Jr.	Story by : Bill Clark & Keith Eisner; Teleplay by : Keith Eisner	November 4, 2003	IA07/5107	10.69
When a woman survives an attack, with very similar initial circumstances to the serial killings, the detectives get some new leads; Medavoy and Jones investigate when an off-duty Narcotics detective kills his attacker in a street robbery gone bad. Russell has a breast biopsy. Notes: Federico Castelluccio guest stars as Brian Vaughn
227	8	"And the Wenner Is..."	Paul Eads	Story by : Bill Clark & Tom Szentgyörgyi; Teleplay by : Tom Szentgyörgyi	November 18, 2003	IA08/5108	9.88
The detectives get a break in the serial killer case, McDowell announces her pregnancy, and she and Sipowicz plan their wedding. Notes: David Marciano guest stars as 'Detective' Raymond Gerson.
228	9	"Only Schmucks Pay Income Tax"	Donna Deitch	Story by : Bill Clark & William Finkelstein; Teleplay by : William Finkelstein	November 25, 2003	IA09/5109	10.17
A retired cop who hasn't adjusted to civilian life and his wife are beaten and robbed in their home, the author of a scam book on not paying taxes has his car torched, and Michael Woodruff's foster father returns him to social services when the boy's natural father Craig threatens his family. Notes: Saul Rubinek guest stars as Barry Tytell
229	10	"You Da Bomb"	John Hyams	Story by : Bill Clark and Matt Olmstead & Nicholas Wootton; Teleplay by : Matt Olmstead & Nicholas Wootton	February 10, 2004	IA10/5110	11.11
A man whose child has been kidnapped and had a bomb attached to his body cuffs himself to McDowell, threatening to blow everyone up, and Devlin's personal issues cause her to end things with Clark. Notes: Jane Lynch guest stars as Susanna Howe
230	11	"Passing the Stone"	Carol Banker	Story by : Bill Clark & Bonnie Mark; Teleplay by : Bonnie Mark	February 17, 2004	IA11/5111	9.42
When a Jewish merchant is murdered in a possible hate crime, Sipowicz and Clark suspect a recent convert to Islam. Meanwhile, Craig Woodruff is the prime suspect in an assault on the boy's aunt, and Andy and Baldwin clash over Michael's refusal to do the right thing.
231	12	"Chatty Chatty, Bang Bang"	Mark Tinker	Story by : Bill Clark & Greg Plageman; Teleplay by : Greg Plageman	March 2, 2004	IA12/5112	9.26
Sipowicz and Clark race a mobster to catch the hit-and-run driver who killed his daughter. Meanwhile a woman is raped by a man who claims he met her in a sick online chat room and was invited to do what he did, Rodriguez resigns from the force in disgust and doesn't appreciate Andy's comments about it, and Jones decides to foster-parent Michael Woodruff. Note: Sterling K. Brown guest stars as Kelvin George, Jerry Ferrara as Danny Puglisi, Doug Savant as Jason Foster, Louis Lombardi as Gio Puglisi, Anthony Denison as Tony Grimalid, and Shannon Lucio as Courtney Bates
232	13	"Take My Wife, Please"	Dennis Dugan	Story by : Bill Clark & Keith Eisner; Teleplay by : Keith Eisner	March 9, 2004	IA13/5113	10.38
A cop is suspected in the murder of a man who was seeing his wife, the body of a comedy club owner is found in the trunk of a stolen car, and the precinct is very surprised by the identity of the new boss as Tony Rodriguez officially retires. Notes: John F. O'Donohue joins the regular cast as Sgt. Eddie Gibson; This is Esai Morales' last episode as Tony Rodriguez; Anton Yelchin guest stars as Evan Grabber and Kirk Acevedo as Scott Grafton
233	14	"Colonel Knowledge"	Steven DePaul	Story by : Bill Clark & Tom Szentgyörgyi; Teleplay by : Tom Szentgyörgyi	March 16, 2004	IA14/5114	9.59
Detectives investigate a Latino gang kingpin for murder, a man reports that his 15-year-old daughter may have been kidnapped, and Sergeant Gibson brings his obnoxious parrot to the precinct. Det. Stan Hatcher joins the 15th precinct and the cops find him to be difficult. Notes: This is Charlotte Ross' last appearance as Connie McDowell; Scott William Winters appears as Detective Stan Hatcher; Michael Peña guest stars as Wilmer Lopez
234	15	"Old Yeller"	Mark Tinker	Story by : Bill Clark & Nicholas Wootton; Teleplay by : Nicholas Wootton	March 23, 2004	IA15/5115	9.69
The search is on for a man who kidnaps, rapes and tortures women and locks them in a dungeon, and Medavoy becomes attracted to a much older woman (Ellen Geer) who may be addicted to sex. Notes: Marc Vann guest stars as Paul Grady; Ellen Geer guest stars as Veronica Lewis
235	16	"On the Fence"	Bob Doherty	Story by : Bill Clark & Matt Olmstead; Teleplay by : Matt Olmstead	March 30, 2004	IA16/5116	9.15
Sipowicz suspects that an off-duty cop who got shot (Hatcher) is dirty, and an old man is shot dead at a seedy hotel.
236	17	"In Goddess We Trussed"	Kevin Hooks	Story by : Bill Clark & Greg Plageman; Teleplay by : Greg Plageman	April 6, 2004	IA17/5117	8.93
Detective Hatcher engineers a transfer for Sipowicz out of the 15th precinct to the Bellevue Morgue with the assent of a spineless Gibson, but Clark Jr. takes the lead in countering the bad detective. Sipowicz, for his part, continues to investigate Hatcher for murder and gets help from a stealth-smart desk officer, and a dominatrix is found bludgeoned to death.
237	18	"The Brothers Grim"	Rick Wallace	Story by : Bill Clark & Keith Eisner; Teleplay by : Keith Eisner	April 13, 2004	IA18/5118	9.78
An 18 year old rape-murder case of Sipowicz's is re-opened when DNA evidence and a confession indicates the man convicted of the crimes wasn't involved. Sipowicz and Clark investigate the death of a con man whose brother was pursued by a bounty hunter. A woman who gave her baby away when she went to prison now wants it back. Notes: Jessalyn Gilsig Joins the 15th as Detective Kelly Ronson; Dakin Matthews guest stars as Simon Clifton; Ron Dean guest stars as Joe Brockhurst
238	19	"Peeler? I Hardly Knew Her"	Jesse Bochco	Story by : Bill Clark & Tom Szentgyörgyi; Teleplay by : Tom Szentgyörgyi	April 20, 2004	IA19/5119	10.20
A man has amnesia after being shot in the head. Leonard Peeler, convicted 18 years before for a rape-murder, is released based on DNA evidence and two lying witnesses admitting they lied. Ortiz and Ronson stumble upon a child-prostitution operation while following a lead in the amnesia case. Notes: Scott Klace guest stars as Linus Creel; Katherine Narducci guest stars as Ann Marie Fusco
239	20	"Traylor Trash"	Mark Tinker	Story by : Bill Clark & Matt Olmstead; Teleplay by : Matt Olmstead	April 27, 2004	IA20/5120	9.89
A former drug addict turned devoted church member is found shot in the chest. The attitude of the father of the rape-murder victim, and his refusal to provide a DNA sample, lead Sipowicz to suspect the father of the rape-murder victim. Devlin shows up at the squad, obviously off her meds, and disturbs both Clark and Ronson. Note: Robin Weigert guest stars as Donna Traylor
240	21	"What’s Your Poison?"	Jesse Bochco	Story by : Bill Clark & Nicholas Wootton; Teleplay by : Nicholas Wootton	May 4, 2004	IA21/5121	9.57
Devlin spirals downward and is committed to a psych ward. As DNA continues to rule out suspects in the 18-year-old case of Cindy Clifton, the prime suspect is now a teacher who was at her school. Ortiz and Ronson catch the case of a man who was relieved of an heirloom $35,000 necklace in a mugging. Michael Woodruff testifies against his father. When the new suspect in Cindy's death is found to have died in an overdose, Andy has strong suspicions about the retired detective who caught the original case and wrestles with how to handle them.
241	22	"Who’s Your Daddy?"	Mark Tinker	Story by : Bill Clark and Nicholas Wootton & Matt Olmstead; Teleplay by : Nicholas Wootton & Matt Olmstea	May 11, 2004	IA22/5122	9.12
Andy and Connie have had a little boy, Matthew Nicholas. Clark picks Devlin up after her release from the hospital, but their reunion is short and tragic & send Clark into a severe funk. Sipowicz, Clark, Medavoy, and Jones investigate the murder of a mom who left her blue collar husband (and father of their son) for a wealthy jerk. An old informant of Ronson's shows up and offers her and Ortiz info about a shipment of stolen guns. Craig Woodruff is found not guilty and Baldwin doesn't handle it well. Notes: Sara Ramirez guest stars as Irma Pacheco and Mark Moses guest stars as Andrew Moss
