= NYPD Blue season 10 =

Season of television series

NYPD Blue
- Season 10
- Season 10 U.S. DVD cover
- No. of episodes: 22

Release
- Original network: ABC
- Original release: September 24, 2002 – May 20, 2003

Season chronology
- ← Previous; Season 9 Next → Season 11

The tenth season of NYPD Blue premiered on ABC on September 24, 2002, and concluded on May 20, 2003.

Actor	Character	Main cast	Recurring cast
Dennis Franz	Andy Sipowicz	entire season	—N/a
Mark-Paul Gosselaar	John Clark Jr.	entire season	—N/a
Gordon Clapp	Greg Medavoy	entire season	—N/a
Henry Simmons	Baldwin Jones	entire season	—N/a
Charlotte Ross	Connie McDowell	entire season	—N/a
Garcelle Beauvais	Valerie Haywood	entire season	—N/a
Jacqueline Obradors	Rita Ortiz	entire season	—N/a
Bill Brochtrup	John Irvin	entire season	—N/a
Esai Morales	Tony Rodriguez	entire season	—N/a
John F. O'Donohue	Eddie Gibson	—N/a	episode 9
Kim Delaney	Diane Russell	—N/a	episode 21

== Episodes ==
No. overall	No. in season	Title	Directed by	Written by	Original release date	Prod. code	U.S. viewers (millions)
198	1	"Ho Down"	Mark Tinker	Story by : Bill Clark & Nicholas Wootton; Teleplay by : Nicholas Wootton	September 24, 2002	HA01/5101	13.17
Sipowicz and Clark go to arrest a shooting suspect and Sipowicz ends up pushing a woman down to the floor; a bystander informs them she's Money T's woman, and Sipowicz is in danger. Medavoy and Jones catch the case of an older woman who has been severely beaten and bound with tape. A friend of Clark's shows up at the 15th to tell Clark his name has come up in the investigation of a murdered prostitute. Clark Sr. admits he was sleeping with her and lets his son lie about her being an informant (adding that he'll step up if the job gives his son something WORSE than a 10-day suspension) but Andy and especially Rita don't support Jr.'s efforts and make that very clear to him.
199	2	"You’ve Got Mail"	Mark Piznarski	Story by : Bill Clark & Matt Olmstead; Teleplay by : Matt Olmstead	October 1, 2002	HA02/5102	12.69
A call comes in from the FBI reporting a bomb threat at the Family Court building; as the detectives evacuate the building, McDowell and Ortiz witness a letter bomb exploding in a Judge's chamber. Clark gets grief from the uniforms about his involvement with a prostitute and is called in to talk to IAB, where Fraker informs him he is a suspect in her murder. After Rita misdirects her anger over Don at Jr., Andy's had enough and angrily tells Sr. what his actions are doing to his kid. Sr. takes the blame, Fraker's vendetta dies (the cops caught a junkie who confessed and Fraker knew he couldn't flip Jr. as an informant after that) and Sr.'s fate is left in very uncertain shape.
200	3	"One in the Nuts"	Michael Switzer	Story by : Bill Clark & Jody Worth; Teleplay by : Jody Worth	October 8, 2002	HA03/5103	13.04
Sipowicz and Clark catch a DOA who has been shot in his apartment, once in the groin and once in the head, his gun lying at his side. Medavoy and Jones respond to a shoot-out at a food mart, where the store owner chased out and may have shot the Hispanic robber. A few blocks away, McDowell and Ortiz respond to a Hispanic man who claims he was shot by a robber down the street. Connie has a visit from her very pregnant sister, who is sporting a black eye given to her by her husband.
201	4	"Meat Me in the Park"	Jesse Bochco	Greg Plageman	October 15, 2002	HA04/5104	12.99
Sipowicz and Clark respond to a call about a missing 5-year-old girl whose father claims that he notified a friend's nanny to watch her while he went to the bathroom; it soon comes out that his visit to the bathroom was to engage in sexual encounters with random men, and is revealed to have been a recurring occurrence, which enabled a predator to make off with her. After the girl is rescued and her kidnapper arrested, the closeted dad tries to get away with blaming the cops for his selfish stupidity, but fails. McDowell and Ortiz, soon joined by Medavoy and Jones, catch the case of a seventeen year old girl who was dragged by a car and then shot. Connie, after finding her sister has once again been beaten by her husband, Frank, has him arrested but her demands on the other cops piss them off and Michelle won't leave him because she won't admit that he means to really hurt her.
202	5	"Death by Cycle"	Jake Paltrow	Story by : Bill Clark & Keith Eisner; Teleplay by : Keith Eisner	October 22, 2002	HA06/5106	14.17
Sipowicz and Clark work the case of a 16 year old boy stabbed to death for his fancy new bicycle; Medavoy and Jones also work the case. Connie once again finds her sister Michelle badly beaten and bleeding and has an ambulance take her to the hospital; Ortiz heads out to find Frank. Michelle ends up dying from a combination of injuries from the beating, premature labor and a C-section to give birth to her daughter. Sipowicz and Ortiz catch Frank as he's about to leave town, and successfully persuade him to confess, before telling him of Michelle's death and arresting him for her murder.
203	6	"Maya Con Dios"	Mark Tinker	Story by : Bill Clark & Tom Szentgyörgyi; Teleplay by : Tom Szentgyörgyi	October 29, 2002	HA05/5105	14.62
The detectives investigate the fatal shooting of a police officer. A call shortly after to a break-in leads to the discovery of one of the perpetrators dead on the roof. McDowell and Ortiz are split off to investigate the kidnapping of a young adopted boy. Clark gets a call that his father is at a bar, drunk and causing problems. Connie and Andy get approval to take her late sister's newborn daughter home from the hospital. Note: Katt Williams guest stars as Martel Cates
204	7	"Das Boots"	Mark Tinker	Story by : Bill Clark & Greg Plageman; Teleplay by : Greg Plageman	November 12, 2002	HA07/5107	12.06
Connie is sleep-deprived and not focusing on the job after becoming a new foster mom; Clark Jr. suspects his father has been forced to be an IAB informant. A dead prostitute is found in a vacant lot, while another dead woman is found in the laundry room of her building. Lt. Rodriguez meets his ex-wife Angela for lunch.
205	8	"Below the Belt"	Mark Piznarski	Story by : Bill Clark & Nicholas Wootton; Teleplay by : Nicholas Wootton	November 19, 2002	HA08/5108	12.05
Clark and McDowell investigate the death of a 17-year-old female auxiliary cop, who turns out to have been having sex with a number of the uniform cops, including the auxiliary captain. McDowell and Ortiz respond to the firebombing of a car and uncover a neighborly feud that nearly turns murderous. Haywood asks Jones to investigate when her grandmother appears to be the victim of a phone scam. Tony continues seeing Angela.
206	9	"Half-Ashed"	Steven DePaul	Story by : Bill Clark & Matt Olmstead; Teleplay by : Matt Olmstead	November 26, 2002	HA09/5109	12.42
Theo has responded negatively to Andy and Connie's announcement that he and his dad are moving into Connie's apartment. At the scene of a dead Child Protective Services worker, Carla Solomon, her neighbor thinks it is suicide, as she says Carla has been depressed lately. More disturbing, the uniforms on scene are throwing a lot of attitude at Sipowicz and Clark because all of them have been called in to talk to IAB, despite Sipowicz and Clark having solemnly promised not to inform on them. The widow of a former 15th Squad detective arrives with some of her husband's ashes, wanting to give them a permanent home at the squad. Angela's more recent ex-husband tells Rodriguez she stole his BMW and Tony's in denial and tells the guy to leave his office.
207	10	"Healthy McDowell Movement"	Tawnia McKiernan	Story by : Bill Clark & Jody Worth; Teleplay by : Jody Worth and Nicholas Wootton & Matt Olmstead	December 10, 2002	HA10/5110	12.29
Andy bids goodbye to his apartment, which he has sublet to a delighted John Irvin. Angela misses a breakfast date with Tony. Clark is upset and moody, having found out it was his father who informed on the uniforms. Sipowicz and Clark, with help from Medavoy and Jones, work the case of a young bipolar man who has vandalized his father's apartment; Ortiz and McDowell investigate a dead party girl, who was adopted at age eight and apparently has a history of attacking people.
208	11	"I Kid You Not"	Joe Ann Fogle	Story by : Bill Clark & Tom Szentgyörgyi; Teleplay by : Tom Szentgyörgyi	January 7, 2003	HA11/5111	11.67
Clark, Sipowicz, Medavoy, and Jones arrive at a DOA and find Laughlin back on the job, entirely ungrateful that they lobbied to have him returned to duty. The DOA is accused of trying to hijack the car of a young errand-runner for a record company. When two ounces of cocaine are found in the car, the young woman is arrested. McDowell and Ortiz find three obviously neglected small children alone at the DOA's last known address. Angela failed to meet with Tony to go to rehab last night; he is called to a DOA, who turns out to be Angela, dead of an overdose. Tony spends the episode in bitter denial before crying alongside her devastated parents when he tells them she is gone. Note: Lori Petty guest stars as Joyce Bradovich
209	12	"Arrested Development"	Jesse Bochco	Story by : Bill Clark & Keith Eisner; Teleplay by : Keith Eisner	January 14, 2003	HA12/5112	11.86
An unpleasant woman is found beaten to death in her apartment. First impressions implicate the illegal immigrant who was doing work for her, but he is a weak suspect. Medavoy and Jones investigate the stabbing death of an abrasive do-gooder who rubbed everyone the wrong way with his holier-than-thou harangues. IAB arrive, on an anonymous tip, and find four ounces of heroin in Clark's car; he's arrested. Andy is sure that Laughlin set him up. Theo regresses and is wetting his bed, despite having stopped more than two years before.
210	13	"Bottoms Up"	Donna Deitch	Story by : Bill Clark & Greg Plageman; Teleplay by : Greg Plageman	February 4, 2003	HA13/5113	11.03
Sipowicz works to prove that Laughlin is the one who planted the heroin in Clark's car. John is visited in jail by his father, who wants to help, but seems more upset that Clark Jr. trusts Sipowicz more than his father to clear his name. The other detectives investigate the rapes of two young women at a local park; both were with their boyfriends, who were tied up and forced to watch.
211	14	"Laughlin All the Way to the Clink"	JoAnne McCool	Story by : Bill Clark & Sonny Postiglione; Teleplay by : Sonny Postiglione	February 11, 2003	HA14/5114	10.95
Shannon comes clean about Laughlin setting up Clark; Clark is released and Laughlin is arrested. Clark Sr., shows up at the station house, drunk, and shouts at the uniforms that he was the one who informed, not his son. Jr. later tells his crestfallen dad to stop making his life worse. A wealthy gay man, who has been serving as an unofficial halfway-house for newly-released convicts, is found dead, as is an activist working to help young gang women get out of their gangs. A gang member has fun screwing with the former case, but Andy uses a contact from his past to get sweet revenge.
212	15	"Tranny Get Your Gun"	Rick Wallace	Story by : Bill Clark & Eric Rogers; Teleplay by : Eric Rogers	February 18, 2003	HA15/5115	11.71
Andy and Connie are having a hard time blending their lives, to the point that Andy hints at John Irvin he might want his apartment back. Cases investigated are a man robbed in a Murphy scam with a transvestite hooker and a young Pakistani woman who appears to be the victim of an "honor killing" by her father.
213	16	"Nude Awakening"	Mark Tinker	Story by : Bill Clark & Matt Olmstead; Teleplay by : Matt Olmstead	February 25, 2003	HA16/5116	11.59
Julian Pisano, the half-helpful, half-worthless snitch from Season 9, is shot and wounded during what he claims was a carjacking, though Andy and Clark Jr. don't really buy his story. Connie and Rita catch a case where a woman was scammed for $100 in the street; the woman gets increasingly annoyed and complains to a high level of the NYPD when she feels her case is being neglected. Clark goes to check on his father and finds he has committed suicide; Andy quickly finds Clark Sr.'s gun cleaning kit so he can arrange the death to appear to be an accident. Sr. leaves a goodbye video for his devastated son. Indecency fine (Note: In January 2008, the FCC announced that they would seek a $1.4 million fine against ABC for the opening sequence, in which Theo Sipowicz walks in on a nude Connie in the bathroom preparing to take a shower. The scene featured full rear nudity and partial frontal nudity on the part of actress Charlotte Ross. The complaint alleged that the nude shot of Ross was held onscreen longer than it should have been, and that Ross' character didn't react fast enough to cover herself. The fine was the largest against a network in recent history. ABC said they would appeal the fine on the grounds that it came over five years after the episode was originally broadcast. If they failed, each of 52 affiliates would pay $27,500 for broadcasting the episode. On January 4, 2011, the U.S. Second Circuit Court of Appeals threw out the fine, citing FCC rules as 'unconstitutionally vague and chilling'. [ABC, Inc., et al. v. Federal Communications Commission, No. 08-0841-ag(L) (2nd Cir.)])
214	17	"Off the Wall"	John Hyams	Story by : Bill Clark & Nicholas Wootton; Teleplay by : Nicholas Wootton	April 8, 2003	HA17/5117	10.88
While investigating a drug dealer's murder, Baldwin and Greg end up in a shootout with the suspect, which results in the death of a 13-year-old boy, an apparent innocent bystander. Rita and Connie investigate the death of a belligerent drunk, who is found a long way outside his usual orbit. Clark Jr. is still down after his father's death, and he tells Rita he doesn't want to go out with her anymore.
215	18	"Marine Life"	Matthew Penn	Story by : Bill Clark & Jody Worth; Teleplay by : Jody Worth	April 15, 2003	HA18/5118	10.70
Things are uneasy between John and Rita after their breakup over his inability to accept her offer to help him deal with his father's suicide. One of the cases investigated is the murder of a record promoter, next to whom is a note reading "Die bitch". The other is the assault of a mail-order bride from Russia, whose fat and ugly husband seems like the obvious suspect because she was getting ready to divorce him. Valerie tells Baldwin about threats she has been receiving.
216	19	"Meet the Grandparents"	Jake Paltrow	Story by : Bill Clark & Greg Plageman; Teleplay by : Greg Plageman	April 29, 2003	HA19/5119	11.42
In court to finalize her adoption of her dead sister's daughter, Connie and Andy are blindsided by the abusive father's parents, who challenge Connie and Andy's fitness as parents. A Nigerian man is killed, possibly having been mistaken for his petty criminal brother. McDowell and Ortiz investigate when a waitress complains of being stalked by a doctor. Valerie is beaten up, and Baldwin tries to make good on the threats he made against the man the week before.
217	20	"Maybe Baby"	Bob Doherty	Story by : Bill Clark & Keith Eisner; Teleplay by : Keith Eisner	May 6, 2003	HA20/5120	11.56
The squad continues to work to help Connie keep custody of baby Michelle by researching the Colahans. Medavoy discovers that Frank had a sister no one knew about, who had some sort of crisis, turning from a happy child to a withdrawn teenager. Medavoy gets a break in the beating of Valerie Heywood when fingerprints in her apartment lead to an associate of the man Baldwin threatened. An old AA friend of Sipowicz' makes the break in the case of a jerk found dead in a shop.
218	21	"Yo, Adrian"	Carol Banker	Story by : Bill Clark & Tom Szentgyörgyi; Teleplay by : Tom Szentgyörgyi	May 13, 2003	HA21/5121	11.77
Andy reaches out to Diane Russell, working now in SVU, to try to get Frank's sister Adrian to open up about her relationship with her father, pointing out that if Michelle is adopted, the same thing will likely happen to her. When a disrespected young woman is found dead, her friends and family are unconcerned though her brother-in-law was using her apartment for affairs and her boyfriend is deep in debt to loan sharks. John and Dr. Jennifer Devlin kindle a torrid relationship.: Note - Kim Delaney returns in an appearance as Diane Russell
219	22	"22 Skidoo"	Mark Tinker	Story by : Bill Clark & Matt Olmstead; Teleplay by : Matt Olmstead	May 20, 2003	HA22/5122	12.46
Rita is finding it harder to deal with John's public embrace of his relationship with Jennifer and requests a transfer. Andy and Connie plan an "under-the-radar" wedding. When a Korean, a Pakistani, and an Arabian-American are all gunned down, initial suspicion falls on a Korean young man, posing as an honors student while running a gang. Fraker shows up at the squad, ranting at both Sipowicz and Rodriguez after the revelation of his affair, which neither had a hand in revealing and nearly kills one of them before Rita saves the day.
