= NYPD Blue season 9 =

Season of television series

NYPD Blue
- Season 9
- Season 9 U.S. DVD cover
- No. of episodes: 22

Release
- Original network: ABC
- Original release: November 6, 2001 – May 21, 2002

Season chronology
- ← Previous; Season 8 Next → Season 10

The ninth season of NYPD Blue premiered on ABC on November 6, 2001, and concluded on May 21, 2002.

Actor	Character	Main cast	Recurring cast
Dennis Franz	Andy Sipowicz	entire season	—N/a
Mark-Paul Gosselaar	John Clark Jr.	entire season	—N/a
Gordon Clapp	Greg Medavoy	entire season	—N/a
Bill Brochtrup	John Irvin	entire season	—N/a
Henry Simmons	Baldwin Jones	entire season	—N/a
Garcelle Beauvais	Valerie Haywood	entire season	—N/a
Charlotte Ross	Connie McDowell	entire season	—N/a
Esai Morales	Tony Rodriguez	entire season	—N/a
Jacqueline Obradors	Rita Ortiz	episodes 8–23	—N/a
John F. O'Donohue	Eddie Gibson	—N/a	episodes 3–8,10,16

== Plot ==
The body of Danny Sorenson is found in a shallow grave. Sipowicz gets a new partner, a son of his old nemesis. Together they track the mafia members who killed Sorenson. Valerie becomes pregnant with Baldwin, but she loses the baby and Baldwin has doubts as to whether it was a miscarriage or an abortion.

== Cast ==
=== Main ===
- Dennis Franz as Andy Sipowicz
- Mark-Paul Gosselaar as John Clark Jr.
- Gordon Clapp as Greg Medavoy
- Henry Simmons as Baldwin Jones
- Charlotte Ross as Connie McDowell
- Bill Brochtrup as John Irvin
- Garcelle Beauvais Nilon as Valerie Haywood
- Esai Morales as Tony Rodriguez
- Jacqueline Obradors as Rita Ortiz (episodes 8–22)

=== Recurring ===
- John F. O'Donohue as Eddie Gibson (episodes 3–8, 10, 16)

== Episodes ==
No. overall	No. in season	Title	Directed by	Written by	Original release date	Prod. code	U.S. viewers (millions)
175	1	"Lie Like a Rug: Part 1"	Mark Tinker	Teleplay by : Matt Olmstead; Story by : Steven Bochco & Bill Clark & Matt Olmstead	November 6, 2001	GA01/5901	15.81
In the wake of the World Trade Center September 11 attacks and Danny's disappearance, the 15th Precinct faces a gruesome investigation when four young girls are found dead in an apartment. Sipowicz, in a black mood because his partner's whereabouts are still unknown, takes out his anger on everyone around him. While investigating the murders, Sipowicz and McDowell team up with a young narcotics officer, John Clark. Note: This was Mark-Paul Gosselaar's first appearance as Off. John Clark, Jr.; This episode was dedicated to the policemen and fire fighters who lost their lives on 9/11
176	2	"Johnny Got His Gold: Part 2"	Mark Piznarski	Teleplay by : Nicholas Wootton; Story by : Steven Bochco & Bill Clark & Nicholas Wootton	November 6, 2001	GA02/5902	15.81
When the undercover sting operation to flush out Danny's killer goes bad, there's a major gun battle in the streets of New York between police and a "made" man. Clark acts the hero, saving innocent bystanders, but takes a bullet himself and gets promoted to Detective Third Grade. When Sipowicz guns the suspect down, he becomes a very reluctant New York hero — and finally receives a well-deserved promotion to Detective First Grade. Rodriguez is furious when his seventy-year-old mother is attacked and nearly raped in her apartment. Medavoy and Jones try to solve an apparent serial-killer targeting NYU students and faculty, and uncover more than they want to about one of the victims. Note: Vanessa Marcil guest stars as Det. Maria Olivera. The show originally planned for Marcil to become a series regular, but the cast and crew weren't impressed with her work, and moved on to cast Jacqueline Obradors in a new but similar role of a newly promoted young Latina officer (Det. Rita Ortiz).; Episodes 1 and 2 originally aired as an uninterrupted 120-minute episode. They were split into two 60-minute episodes for reruns, syndication, and streaming.
177	3	"Two Clarks in a Bar"	Henry J. Bronchtein	Story by : Bill Clark & Jody Worth; Teleplay by : Jody Worth	November 13, 2001	GA03/5903	13.13
After Danny's funeral, the squad returns to the office and Sipowicz is partnered with newly-minted Detective John Clark, Jr. Clark's father, John Clark, Sr. — Sipowicz's old nemesis at another precinct — butts heads with both Sipowicz and Clark Jr., when he interferes with their first case together, the stabbing death of a wealthy woman. McDowell and Jones discover that a vintage '56 Les Paul guitar is a key piece of evidence in the death of a young, struggling musician. Note: Eric Balfour guest stars as Charles 'Spyder' Price
178	4	"Hit the Road, Clark"	Jake Paltrow	Story by : Bill Clark & Elizabeth Sarnoff; Teleplay by : Elizabeth Sarnoff	November 20, 2001	GA04/5904	12.87
Sipowicz and Clark investigate the murder of a woman; on first appearances she appears to be a prostitute, but she turns out to be a correctional officer whose off-duty behaviour is a bit off according to her co-workers. McDowell is assigned a new partner, Eddie Gibson, whose meddling got between Sipowicz and Eddie's niece. The two investigate the murder of a woman with multiple sclerosis - and multiple family issues.
179	5	"Cops and Robber"	Mark Tinker	Story by : Bill Clark & Harold Sylvester; Teleplay by : Harold Sylvester	November 27, 2001	GA05/5905	13.56
Clark's promotion is threatened after a thief steals his badge and then a rash of muggings are reported involving a man flashing a badge. McDowell takes a special interest in a murder investigation involving a pregnant teenager and continues to deal with Eddie Gibson's incompetence.
180	6	"Baby Love"	Donna Deitch	Story by : Bill Clark & Matt Olmstead; Teleplay by : Matt Olmstead	December 4, 2001	GA06/5906	14.87
The entire Fifteenth is on the case of a baby missing from a maternity ward; Medavoy and Jones also work the case of a television store owned by two Arab brothers that was torched by a Molotov Cocktail. Andy finds out Eddie has a serious health issue and volunteers to swap partners with Connie. Connie begins following a young woman for no apparent reason. Note: Kal Penn guest stars as Solomon Al-Ramai; Niecy Nash guest stars as Tonya Dunbar; Although the show took place in a post-9/11 universe beginning with the Season 9 premiere, this was the first S9 episode to actually be filmed after the attacks.
181	7	"Mom’s Away"	Steven DePaul	Story by : Bill Clark & Nicholas Wootton; Teleplay by : Nicholas Wootton	December 11, 2001	GA07/5907	13.56
McDowell crosses the line with the daughter she gave up for adoption; Sipowicz, Gibson, and Clark investigate two young men found dead in a gang hangout, and Medavoy, Jones, and McDowell are on the case of a woman found dumped at a construction site that had been inactive since the 9/11 attacks.
182	8	"Puppy Love"	Dick Lowry	Story by : Bill Clark & Jody Worth; Teleplay by : Jody Worth	December 18, 2001	GA08/5908	13.76
Sipowicz moonlights as a guard for an eccentric woman who drinks and sings showtunes. When new Detective Rita Ortiz joins the squad, Sipowicz thinks she's unqualified. Meanwhile, Medavoy and Jones investigate the theft of purebred puppies from a pet store, and Sipowicz and Clark investigate the case of a murdered man accused of child molestation. Note: This was Jacqueline Obradors' first appearance as Det. Rita Ortiz
183	9	"Here Comes the Son"	Charles Haid	Story by : Bill Clark & Jonathan Robert Kaplan; Teleplay by : Jonathan Robert Kaplan	January 8, 2002	GA09/5909	12.18
A series of robberies at massage parlors forces Andy to work with his nemesis and his partner's father John Clark Sr., and Clark Sr. doesn't miss an opportunity to flaunt his by-the-book approach and put down Andy's whatever-it-takes pursuit. The other cops are unhappy when they have to investigate two good Samaritans who beat a mugger to death, Rita continues to face harassment from her jerk husband, and Valerie tells Baldwin she's pregnant.
184	10	"Jealous Hearts"	Bob Doherty	Story by : Bill Clark & Matt Olmstead; Teleplay by : Matt Olmstead & Nicholas Wootton	January 15, 2002	GA10/5910	12.49
A mentally unbalanced woman poses as a cop and performs heroic acts, lowlife Julian Pisano demands a reward before he'll ID the murderer of two young men at a taco stand, and Sipowicz tracks down the crook who is embezzling from the moneyed eccentric Mrs. Hornby.
185	11	"Humpty Dumped"	Dianne Houston	Story by : Bill Clark & Nicholas Wootton; Teleplay by : Nicholas Wootton & Matt Olmstead	February 5, 2002	GA11/5911	12.69
Detective Rita Ortiz is told her husband is having an affair and later finds out it's the truth; Sipowicz and Clark face a young murder witness whose mother won't allow her to testify; Medavoy and Jones are at odds with each other during a murder case; and Sipowicz uncovers Mrs. Hornby's embezzler.
186	12	"Oh, Mama"	Peter Markle	Story by : Bill Clark & Jody Worth; Teleplay by : Jody Worth	February 19, 2002	GA12/5912	10.40
A murder investigation leads Sipowicz and Clark to a deranged woman who is having an incestuous relationship with her teenaged son; Ortiz and McDowell investigate the death of a child killed by a stray bullet; Connie and Andy take Theo out to the movies; and, PAA John gets Andy's advice when considering a trip to Africa with his boyfriend. Sipowicz and McDowell take their relation to the next level. Note: Aaron Paul guest stars as Marcus Denton
187	13	"Safari, So Good"	Mark Piznarski	Story by : Bill Clark & Matt Olmstead; Teleplay by : Matt Olmstead & Nicholas Wootton	February 26, 2002	GA13/5913	12.05
Clark and McDowell suspect a sixteen-year-old prostitute's involvement when a respected physician is murdered. Meanwhile, Sipowicz, who's avoiding McDowell after their recent kiss, investigates the murder of a rehabilitated felon whom he had long regarded as a foe; Baldwin is devastated by personal events but restores his friendship with Greg; Rita's husband swears he'll make her life miserable when she says her divorce decision is final; and PAA John's temporary replacement in the squad is not much liked by anyone.: Robert Wisdom guest stars as Eric Green.
188	14	"Hand Job"	Tawnia McKiernan	Story by : Bill Clark & Matt Olmstead; Teleplay by : Matt Olmstead	March 5, 2002	GA14/5914	11.60
Clark protects a police friend who is suspected in the cover-up of a rap star's murder, and Ortiz and McDowell investigate when a man and his stripper girlfriend are found crucified in her apartment.
189	15	"Guns & Hoses"	Craig Zisk	Story by : Bill Clark & Nicholas Wootton; Teleplay by : Nicholas Wootton	March 12, 2002	GA15/5915	11.99
Sipowicz and Clark investigate the firebombing of an abortion clinic that resulted in the death of a security guard. Meanwhile Ortiz and McDowell find a dead woman whom Ortiz recognizes as her husband's mistress; Medavoy and Jones track another woman who's been missing for five years; and, Baldwin and Valerie have an ugly confrontation.
190	16	"A Little Dad’ll Do Ya"	Steven DePaul	Story by : Bill Clark & Jody Worth; Teleplay by : Jody Worth	March 19, 2002	GA16/5916	12.34
Clark tries to find a foster home for a teenaged boy who's been sexually abused by his mother. Meanwhile, he and Sipowicz are investigating the murder of a teenaged girl from a family that never wanted her; Ortiz and McDowell question a woman who claims she was raped by her fiancé's half-cousin; and, PAA John has a bitter reunion with his homophobic, dying father.
191	17	"Gypsy Woe’s Me"	Mark Tinker	Story by : Bill Clark & Nicholas Wootton; Teleplay by : Nicholas Wootton & Matt Olmstead	March 26, 2002	GA17/5917	11.05
A black man is fatally shot by a white cabbie — who claims self-defense — and Clark defends Ortiz against the advances of a sleazy cop, Laughlin, who then challenges Clark to a boxing match. Meanwhile, Rodriguez fears he's being set up for dismissal on bribery charges; a gay man is killed outside a bar; and, PAA John and his father make peace with each other.
192	18	"Less Is Morte"	Matthew Penn	Story by : Bill Clark & Stephen Adly Guirgis; Teleplay by : Stephen Adly Guirgis	April 16, 2002	GA18/5918	11.45
An armored car guard is shot to death; a female bank employee is found dead in a dumpster; and Sipowicz intervenes in an attempt to save Lieutenant Rodriguez's job. The armored car investigation reveals the culprit to be a bungling group of amateurs looking to pay off their bookie, and Andy confronts IAB Captain Fraker on the merits of his grudge against Rodriguez. When Andy reveals that he knows of Fraker's affair with another cop, Fraker sees the light and drops the investigation against him. Rodriguez is touched by Andy's assistance, even though Andy won't admit helping him. Meanwhile, Clark prepares for his upcoming boxing match with Laughlin, and Ortiz seems to take a liking to Clark's chivalry.
193	19	"Low Blow"	Mark Tinker	Story by : Bill Clark & Nicholas Wootton; Teleplay by : Nicholas Wootton	April 30, 2002	GA19/5919	10.54
Cops ridicule Clark when they think he is backing out of the big boxing match against Laughlin. Meanwhile, a fireman suspected of raping his estranged wife is also suspected of brutally raping another woman, and a phony physician is found dead in his car. Clark and Laughlin's fight is canceled by the event organizer, but when they convince him the fight is not a grudge match, he reinstates it. At the fight, Clark knocks out Laughlin, despite taking a nasty, deliberate low blow from his angry competitor. Afterward, Ortiz arrives at Clark's door to thank him for his chivalry, and Clark and Ortiz spend the night together. Note: Gabrielle Carteris guest stars as a rape victim; Neil Flynn guest stars as Kevin Healey
194	20	"Oedipus Wrecked"	Nelson McCormick	Story by : Bill Clark & Matt Olmstead; Teleplay by : Matt Olmstead	May 7, 2002	GA20/5920	12.39
Sipowicz is taken hostage by a gunman in the interrogation room. Meanwhile, a woman is busted for possession of narcotics that her son planted on her; one of three people shot execution-style survives; and, Medavoy's daughter threatens to elope because his ex can't face him at the wedding.: Daniel Roebuck guest stars as Dave Burgess, the gunman that held Sipowicz hostage.
195	21	"Dead Meat in New Deli"	Jake Paltrow	Story by : Bill Clark & Jody Worth; Teleplay by : Jody Worth	May 14, 2002	GA21/5921	11.86
Sipowicz and Clark investigate the murder of a deli owner but begin to question the integrity of a robbery detective who is helping them with the case. Meanwhile, McDowell and Ortiz stumble on a sex slave operation, and McDowell accepts Sipowicz's proposal to join him and Theo on a vacation to Walt Disney World. Note: Daniel Baldwin guest stars as Det. Frank Hughes
196	22	"Better Laid Than Never: Parts 1 & 2"	Mark Tinker	Teleplay by : Matt Olmstead & Nicholas Wootton; Story by : Bill Clark & Nicholas Wootton & Matt Olmstead	May 21, 2002	GA22A/5922A	12.94
197	23	"Better Laid Than Never: Parts 1 & 2"	Mark Tinker	Teleplay by : Matt Olmstead & Nicholas Wootton; Story by : Bill Clark & Nicholas Wootton & Matt Olmstead	May 21, 2002	GA22B/5922B	12.94
Andy and Connie return from their week's holiday with Theo. A boy goes missing, and the squad is led to a pedophile in the area. John meets with a lawyer about his father's estate. McDowell and Ortiz investigate the death of a woman found in her apartment, where an ex-con neighbor is suspect. The investigation into Scott's murder points towards his friend. Andy thinks about the future. Rita meets John's father. Note: Claudia Christian guest stars as Catherine Lowe; Mark Pellegrino guest stars as Steve Dansick; Episodes 22 and 23 originally aired as an uninterrupted 120-minute episode. They were split into two 60-minute episodes for reruns, syndication, and streaming.
