= NYPD Blue season 8 =

Season of television series

NYPD Blue
- Season 8
- Season 8 U.S. DVD cover
- No. of episodes: 20

Release
- Original network: ABC
- Original release: January 9 – May 22, 2001

Season chronology
- ← Previous; Season 7 Next → Season 9

The eighth season of NYPD Blue premiered on ABC on January 9, 2001, and concluded on May 22, 2001.

Actor	Character	Main cast	Recurring cast
Dennis Franz	Andy Sipowicz	entire season	—N/a
Rick Schroder	Danny Sorenson	entire season	—N/a
James McDaniel	Arthur Fancy	episodes 1–13	—N/a
Kim Delaney	Diane Russell	episodes 1–18	—N/a
Gordon Clapp	Greg Medavoy	entire season	—N/a
Bill Brochtrup	John Irvin	entire season	—N/a
Henry Simmons	Baldwin Jones	entire season	—N/a
Garcelle Beauvais	Valerie Haywood	episodes 11–20	episodes 3–10
Charlotte Ross	Connie McDowell	episodes 12–20	episodes 9, 11
Esai Morales	Tony Rodriguez	episodes 14–20	episode 13
John F. O'Donohue	Eddie Gibson	—N/a	episodes 6, 10–11, 13–14

== Episodes ==
No. overall	No. in season	Title	Directed by	Written by	Original release date	Prod. code	U.S. viewers (millions)
155	1	"Daveless in New York"	Mark Tinker	Teleplay by : Matt Olmstead & Jody Worth; Story by : Bill Clark & Jody Worth & Matt Olmstead	January 9, 2001	EA01/5801	16.41
Sipowicz clings to son Theo's improved appearance as a sign that he is cured, but others are not so sure. The 15th precinct detectives are nervous and defensive about testifying to Internal Affairs concerning Kirkendall's suspected involvement in her ex-husband's activities. Leo Cohen, now in private practice, serves as counsel for the detectives and shares his usual sarcastic attitude with a short-tempered Andy. Diane Russell is once again forced to deal with the unsavory Harry Denby in an effort to confirm Jill Kirkendall's innocence. Sorenson wants to deal with Denby on Diane's behalf and his actions lead to a schism between Danny and Mary and a surprising resolution for Danny and Diane.
156	2	"Waking Up Is Hard to Do"	Steven DePaul	Story by : Bill Clark & Jody Worth; Teleplay by : Jody Worth	January 16, 2001	EA02/5802	14.12
Andy's mood turns dramatically when he gets good news about Theo's health, but he maintains his composure to help Greg and Baldwin solve a case involving a series of cabdriver homicides. Diane spars with Denby in an effort to forestall an IAB investigation into Jill's involvement with her ex-husband Don's activities. Denby's information is useless, as is the "help" from Bobby Simone's slippery friend Ray DiSalvo, who offers to kill Don. After Don is reported dead, Ray attempts to entrap Danny by saying he committed the murder as Danny directed, but Danny reveals he recorded their first conversation, which ends Ray's ploy. With Don dead, Cohen tells Diane the IAB investigation is over.
157	3	"Franco, My Dear, I Don’t Give a Damn"	Mark Tinker	Story by : Bill Clark & Matt Olmstead; Teleplay by : Matt Olmstead	January 23, 2001	EA03/5803	15.16
When a female cop is shot while responding to a call, her husband, an NYPD captain, blames her partner and wants to seek his own revenge. A new assistant district attorney, Valerie Heywood arrives to handle the case and prompts concerns with her by-the-book approach. Sorenson must make some important decisions in his personal life, which is bad news for Mary Franco and maybe good news for Diane. Notes: First appearance of Garcelle Beauvais as A.D.A Valerie Heywood; Richard Brooks guest stars as Capt. Eric Knowlton; Eugene Byrd guest stars as Andre Cutler
158	4	"Family Ties"	Bob Doherty	Story by : Bill Clark & Buzz Bissinger; Teleplay by : Buzz Bissinger	January 30, 2001	EA04/5804	14.00
The brutal rape of a tourist in her hotel room may not have been a merely random attack. PAA John Irvin faces his phobia of little people during work on another case from the same hotel. Danny tries to ease the awkwardness with Andy over his relationship with Diane, who comes to a difficult decision of her own that devastates Danny.
159	5	"Fools Russian"	Farrel Jane Levy	Story by : Bill Clark & Jonathan Lisco; Teleplay by : Jonathan Lisco	February 6, 2001	EA05/5805	13.76
The detectives are suspicious of a Russian widow's alibi when her husband is found floating in the East River. Medavoy's newfound interest in the Chinese language comes in handy when he and Detective Harold Ng (Episodes 2.3 & 3.9) help an immigrant family rescue their kidnapped relative. Diane is emotionally conflicted about the end of her relationship with Danny.: Tzi Ma guests as Det. Harold Ng
160	6	"Writing Wrongs"	Steven DePaul	Teleplay by : Alexandra Cunningham; Story by : Bill Clark & T.J. English and Steven Bochco	February 13, 2001	EA06/5806	14.12
A high school girl's essays could lead detectives to her killer. Diane finds the investigation of the girl's hidden life to be especially disturbing. In spite of his own personal pain, Danny shows compassion and patience with a mentally ill homeless man who witnessed a murder. As Andy Sipowicz re-enters the dating world, he is confronted with a reality of single parenting -- finding a babysitter.
161	7	"In-Laws, Outlaws"	Jake Paltrow	Teleplay by : Buzz Bissinger & Jonathan Lisco; Story by : Bill Clark & T.J. English and Steven Bochco	February 20, 2001	EA07/5807	12.68
Danny feels personally responsible when the homeless man he tried to protect is released from a holding cell and then murdered. His frustration causes him to lash out at co-workers but he is relentless in his pursuit of the homeless man's murderer. An apparent murder-suicide with a connection to Harry Denby also brings out Danny's mean side and leads to a stunning confrontation between him and Diane. Andy has another date with Cynthia Bunin that both seem to enjoy.
162	8	"Russellmania"	Karen Gaviola	Story by : Bill Clark & Jody Worth; Teleplay by : Jody Worth	February 27, 2001	EA08/5808	11.62
The murder-suicide from the previous episode leads to Harry Denby, which prompts what could be the final showdown between Denby and Diane. Danny's path of anger and destruction continues, and his mishandling of a double-murder case forces Lieutenant Fancy to assign him to desk duty, with termination of his employment a distinct possibility. Andy and the rest of the detective squad confront Danny directly to reinforce to him how badly his actions are affecting their cases and his career.
163	9	"Oh, Golly Goth"	Mark Tinker	Story by : Bill Clark & Matt Olmstead; Teleplay by : Matt Olmstead	March 6, 2001	EA09/5809	13.69
A trio of Goth teens are involved in a stabbing during a night of wild partying. New evidence gives Sipowicz the opportunity to save the case Sorenson mishandled. Russell works with Connie McDowell, who has to overcome brief hostility when she fills in for Danny. Andy delivers Danny a stern lecture about how his recent words and actions make him difficult to work with, affecting both the detective squad and the cases they are attempting to solve. Note: First appearance of Charlotte Ross as Connie McDowell.; Pedro Pascal guest stars as Shane "Dio" Morrissey.; Taryn Manning guest stars as Tracy, a witness to a homicide.
164	10	"In the Still of the Night"	Bob Doherty	Story by : Bill Clark & Alexandra Cunningham; Teleplay by : Alexandra Cunningham	March 13, 2001	EA10/5810	14.30
Sipowicz and a fully reinstated Sorenson work to help an officer's relative whose temper gets him in trouble, while the rest of the detectives investigate an apparent stabbing attack on Captain Bass' wife. Romance blossoms as Sipowicz spends more time with Cynthia and Baldwin Jones has a date, while PAA John finds an admirer in an antiques store owner. Note: Scott Lawrence guest stars as Anthony Mackey
165	11	"Peeping Tommy"	Michael Watkins	Teleplay by : Victor Bumbalo and Matt Olmstead & Nicholas Wootton; Story by : Bill Clark & Victor Bumbalo	March 20, 2001	EA11/5811	13.32
Sipowicz's split-second decision during a shooting puts his entire career in jeopardy unless a missing crime victim can be found to corroborate his story. Danny and Diane team up to find evidence that exonerates Andy. A rape at a bar leads to a disturbing discovery that lets Connie close the case, leading to permanent assignment to the 15th precinct.: Timothy Omundson guest stars as Seth Werna, the department Shrink.; Eric Balfour guest stars as Eli Beardsley.
166	12	"Thumb Enchanted Evening"	John Tracy	Story by : Bill Clark & Buzz Bissinger; Teleplay by : Buzz Bissinger	March 27, 2001	EA12/5812	14.84
Andy has an unusual response upon hearing the news that Fancy is leaving the 15th precinct. Russell and McDowell work to track down a severed penis in hopes of reattaching it to its owner. When Sipowicz and Sorenson investigate what seems to be a mob execution, their suspect makes a deal for immunity that leads to a suspect for a long-unsolved drug murder. Lieutenant Dalto takes over for Fancy and generates immediate animosity that makes the detective squad dysfunctional. Notes: Denise Crosby guest stars as Lt. Susan Dalto; Ricardo Chavira guest stars as Customs Off. Kenny Sotomayor
167	13	"Flight of Fancy"	Kevin Hooks	Story by : Bill Clark & Jonathan Lisco; Teleplay by : Jonathan Lisco	April 3, 2001	EA13/5813	16.63
As Fancy moves on to his new position as a captain, the sadness felt by the detectives of the 15th precinct is compounded by the chafing ways of Lieutenant Dalto. Fancy asks for a final favor from Captain Bass, resulting in Dalto's removal from command and assignment of a new lieutenant. A teenage immigrant girl with a troubled past is murdered and there are numerous suspects. Notes: Last appearance of James McDaniel as Arthur Fancy. Following this episode, Dennis Franz (who plays Andy Sipowicz) is the last remaining member of the original cast and the only actor to star in all twelve seasons and in every single episode.; First appearance of Esai Morales as Tony Rodriguez.; Denise Crosby guest stars as Lt. Susan Dalto
168	14	"Nariz a Nariz"	Steven DePaul	Story by : Bill Clark & Jody Worth; Teleplay by : Jody Worth	April 10, 2001	EA14/5814	14.21
Sipowicz reaches out to an alcoholic ex-cop whose daughter has been murdered. The new squad commander, Lieutenant Rodriguez steps in when detectives from another squad try to take over the 15th precinct's investigation. Andy stumbles in his new relationship with Cynthia and turns to his ex-wife Katie for comfort. Notes: John Finn guest stars as Jimmy McElroy
169	15	"Love Hurts"	Rick Wallace	Story by : Bill Clark & Harold Sylvester; Teleplay by : Harold Sylvester	April 17, 2001	EA15/5815	14.03
When a cop gets shot, the detectives launch a major investigation and are surprised to learn that the shooting may not have been as random as he claims. Medavoy's good intentions to help a store owner backfire, and Sipowicz takes offense when Lieutenant Rodriguez steps in and uses a prior relationship with a suspect to extract a confession.
170	16	"Everyone Into the Poole"	Mark Tinker	Story by : Bill Clark & Nicholas Wootton; Teleplay by : Nicholas Wootton	April 24, 2001	EA16/5816	14.17
When a victim's claims of being kidnapped don't add up, the victim accuses Sipowicz and Sorenson of homophobia. Jones deals with the parents of teens who killed a Chinese food delivery man, who accuse Jones of being a race traitor. Diane's friendship with the doctor who treated Bobby during his final illness becomes public knowledge at the precinct. Andy tries to make major changes in his life in an effort to create stability for Theo.
171	17	"Dying to Testify"	Dennis M. White	Story by : Bill Clark & Matt Olmstead; Teleplay by : Matt Olmstead	May 1, 2001	EA17/5817	13.54
When A.D.A. Valerie Haywood needs help tracking down a wayward witness, she turns to McDowell and Russell. They find the reluctant witness and stay with her overnight to ensure she makes her court appearance. The three women forge an unusual bond in the course of the evening but the witness disappears before testifying. A deeply remorseful Valerie seeks comfort with Baldwin. Andy and Danny work to obtain a confession from a suspect so an eyewitness can avoid the stress of testifying.
172	18	"Lost Time"	Bob Doherty	Story by : Bill Clark & Buzz Bissinger; Teleplay by : Buzz Bissinger	May 8, 2001	EA18/5818	14.68
Still grieving the loss of her husband and the failed relationship with Danny Sorenson, Diane leaves her job in order to get her life back together. Her unannounced and sudden departure causes hurt feelings, especially for Danny. Medavoy and Sipowicz go undercover to nab a pair of robbers who prey on the elderly. Andy wonders openly whether his plan to marry his ex-wife in order to create a stable home for Theo is a good idea. Danny meets a stripper while working a double-murder case and seems to be falling for her. Notes: Final appearance of Kim Delaney as a regular cast member. Delaney would return as a guest star in five episodes during seasons 10 & 11.; Greg Grunberg guest stars as Joey Schulman
173	19	"Under Covers"	Donna Deitch	Story by : Bill Clark & Alexandra Cunningham; Teleplay by : Alexandra Cunningham	May 15, 2001	EA19/5819	12.93
Much to Andy's displeasure, Danny seems to be losing himself in his relationship with Kristen, even placing himself in jeopardy in attempting to protect her from a rude strip club patron. Connie works with Greg on a case where a young woman manipulated two men into committing a robbery that turned into a double homicide. Katie and Andy make a crucial decision about their remarriage. Baldwin struggles to holds his temper in check while working on a case in which a woman was savagely beaten and her husband murdered for no apparent reason. Note: Greg Grunberg guest stars as Joey Schulman; Last appearance of Rick Schroeder as Danny Sorenson, however he remains in the opening credits for the next episode.; Final appearance of Debra Monk as Katie Sipowicz.
174	20	"In the Wind"	Mark Tinker	Teleplay by : Jonathan Lisco; Story by : Steven Bochco & Bill Clark & Jonathan Lisco	May 22, 2001	EA20/5820	15.12
Danny is missing, and his colleagues fear the worst. Kristen is found dead in his apartment. As the detectives desperately cling to the belief that Danny is not the murderer, concern and fear for his wellbeing cloud their search. Rodriguez gets the squad to focus on the job and helps them close a murder case involving a gay hustler and a minister's wife. Notes: Greg Grunberg guest stars as Joey Schulman; World Trade Center last appearance in this series
