= List of NYPD Blue characters =

The following is a partial list of the numerous characters that appeared on NYPD Blue during the twelve seasons it was on the air.

== Main cast chart ==
Character	Portrayed by	Position	Seasons											
Character	Portrayed by	Position	1	2	3	4	5	6	7	8	9	10	11	12
John Kelly	David Caruso	Detective	Main	Main										
Andy Sipowicz	Dennis Franz	Detective/Sergeant	Main	Main	Main	Main	Main	Main	Main	Main	Main	Main	Main	Main
Arthur Fancy	James McDaniel	Lieutenant/Captain	Main	Main	Main	Main	Main	Main	Main	Main				
Laura Michaels Kelly	Sherry Stringfield	A.D.A.	M											
Janice Licalsi	Amy Brenneman	Officer/Detective	Main	Main										
James Martinez	Nicholas Turturro	Officer/Detective/Sergeant	Main	Main	Main	Main	Main	Main	Main					
Sylvia Costas	Sharon Lawrence	A.D.A.	R	Main	Main	Main	R	M						
Greg Medavoy	Gordon Clapp	Detective	R	Main	Main	Main	Main	Main	Main	Main	Main	Main	Main	Main
Donna Abandando	Gail O'Grady	P.A.A.	R	Main	Main			G						
Bobby Simone	Jimmy Smits	Detective		Main	Main	Main	Main	Main						G
Adrienne Lesniak	Justine Miceli	Detective		R	M									
Diane Russell	Kim Delaney	Detective		R	Main	Main	Main	Main	Main	Main		G	G	
Jill Kirkendall	Andrea Thompson	Detective				R	Main	Main	Main					
Danny Sorenson	Rick Schroder	Detective						Main	Main	Main				
John Irvin	Bill Brochtrup	P.A.A.		R	R		R	Main	Main	Main	Main	Main	Main	Main
Baldwin Jones	Henry Simmons	Detective							Main	Main	Main	Main	Main	Main
Valerie Haywood	Garcelle Beauvais	A.D.A.								Main	Main	Main	Main	
Connie McDowell	Charlotte Ross	Detective								Main	Main	Main	Main	
Tony Rodriguez	Esai Morales	Lieutenant								Main	Main	Main	Main	
John Clark Jr.	Mark-Paul Gosselaar	Officer/Detective									Main	Main	Main	Main
Rita Ortiz	Jacqueline Obradors	Detective									Main	Main	Main	Main
Eddie Gibson	John F. O'Donohue	Detective/Sergeant							Recurring	Recurring	Recurring	G	M	
Thomas Bale	Currie Graham	Lieutenant												M
Laura Murphy	Bonnie Somerville	Detective												M

Main - may only feature in a portion of their first or last season
Recurring
Guest

== Main 15th Squad detectives ==
- Andy Sipowicz
- Bobby Simone
- Greg Medavoy
- John Clark Jr.
- Diane Russell
- James Martinez
- Baldwin Jones
- Connie McDowell
- John Kelly — The original protagonist. He appeared in the first season and the first four episodes of the second. Kelly was born in 1958, joined the police force in 1979, and became a detective in 1986 at age 28. At the start of season one, Kelly is in the midst of a divorce from his wife Laura and begins a relationship with Janice Licalsi. When Licalsi is charged with murder, Kelly destroys evidence to obstruct the prosecution. While he gets away without legal consequences, the police department pushes him to quit, after which he leaves the country to work as a private security consultant for an American corporation's India branch. After leaving, Kelly never returned to the precinct and was rarely mentioned by name. Played by David Caruso.
- Danny Sorenson — Appeared from seasons six (1998) through eight (2001). An army veteran of the Gulf War and member of the United States Army Reserve, he moved to the 15th squad from Narcotics after Bobby Simone's death. Originally from Norway, his younger sisters and he were raised by an aunt in Albany, New York. While the other detectives were initially wary of the youthful Sorenson, his professionalism and proactive approach earned him their respect. Sorenson had a brief romantic relationship with Officer Mary Franco, but was clearly attracted to Simone's widow, Detective Diane Russell, and they briefly dated. The death of a drug addict he had been mentoring appeared to cause Sorenson to become erratic, but this was a ruse to facilitate his participation in an undercover assignment investigating an organized crime syndicate. Sorenson soon disappeared during the assignment, and his body was uncovered in a shallow grave six months later. His death was attributed to the criminal enterprise he had been investigating. Played by Rick Schroder.

== Other 15th Squad detectives ==
- Adrienne Lesniak — An experienced detective who transferred in to the 15th Squad in Season 2 after her relationship with a co-worker at her old precinct went public. The former boyfriend began stalking her, which caused her to avoid dating colleagues. When James Martinez expressed a romantic interest, she brushed him off by telling him she was gay. Martinez and Lesniak later dated, but Lesniak's jealousy caused her to become possessive. Martinez broke up with her and she later left the 15th Precinct after Season 3. Played by Justine Miceli.
- Jill Kirkendall — Diane Russell's partner, she was a recurring character in Season 4 and a regular from Seasons 5 to 7. A highly skilled detective, her inability to break free of her ex-husband Don ended her career. Don committed crimes with Harry Denby and manipulated Jill into aiding him by threatening to inform on her to Internal Affairs or kill their children. The other 15th Squad detectives engineered Don's arrest in a way that enabled Jill to avoid being arrested with him, after which she and her sons fled New York City to avoid police and prosecutors. While a few moments early in Season 8 hinted that Jill's name could be cleared before or after Don paid for his crimes, she never returned to the job and was never mentioned again after that. Played by Andrea Thompson.
- Rita Ortiz — Transferred in from Vice in Season 9 because her husband Don Harrison, an assistant district attorney, was upset with her dressing as a street walker to effect arrests. Don's increasingly paranoid delusions covered for the fact that he was cheating on Rita, which came to light after he was murdered by his girlfriend's husband. Rita dated John Clark Jr. until his behavior after his father's death led to their breakup. She saved Tony Rodriguez from Captain Fraker's attempt to murder him by shooting Fraker before he could fire at Rodriguez a second time. Rodriguez and Ortiz began a personal relationship after he retired, but it was unclear, though suggested, they were still dating. When she reached out to a fellow officer that had previously expressed interest, he attempted to finally persuade her to date him. She declined which suggested she remained in a relationship with Rodriguez. Played by Jacqueline Obradors.
- Stan Hatcher — Hatcher was assigned to the 15th Precinct as a replacement for Connie McDowell in Season 11 when she went on maternity leave. Hatcher had killed his wife years previously, but the case had gone unsolved because it was attributed to the perpetrator in one of his cases trying to kill him. While working for the 15th squad, he stalked a former girlfriend and got shot when he was mistaken for a burglar. He emerged as a devious, violent, corrupt cop who used his connection to his uncle to get Sipowicz transferred to morgue duty. Sipowicz, Clark, and Detective Wally Dorland from the morgue eventually determined that Hatcher had killed his wife. Though they did not have enough evidence to bring criminal charges, Sipowicz and Clark confronted Hatcher and told him to leave the 15th; Hatcher ended up retiring in disgrace from the force altogether and became a private investigator. After his uncle learned of his true nature, he opted to no longer protect him. In Season 12, he launched a campaign to ruin Sipowicz, including purchasing child sex abuse material with Sipowicz's credit card, badmouthing him to fellow A.A. members, poisoning his beloved pet fish and having a client temporarily abduct Sipowicz's son. Sipowicz threatened Hatcher's life in response, but Hatcher had actually set up Sipowicz by recording the threats. The dispute ended when Bale reluctantly brokered a deal with Hatcher's uncle which kept Andy out of trouble and forced Stan to permanently relocate to Miami. Played by Scott William Winters.
- Kelly Ronson — Transferred in from Brooklyn North late in Season 11 after the welcome departure of Det. Stan Hatcher. She raised a few eyebrows at the 15th when she said she was attending law school at night, but she and Rita Ortiz worked well together. She was unsettled when Dr. Jennifer Devlin, John Clark's bipolar ex-girlfriend falsely accused her of having sex with him. Ronson left the 15th Precinct between Seasons 11 and 12 and her absence was not noted. Played by Jessalyn Gilsig.
- Laura Murphy — joined the 15th Precinct at the beginning of the twelfth season after having worked in the Applications Investigations unit. Murphy was the long-term replacement for Connie McDowell after Connie married Andy Sipowicz, then became a stay at home mother. As she explained to her co-workers, Murphy was from a family of brothers and cousins who were all New York City firefighters. Partnered with Rita Ortiz, Ortiz was initially concerned at what she believed was Murphy's overly flirtatious attitude with fellow cops, including John Clark. They quickly overcame these difficulties and began to work as an effective team. Played by Bonnie Somerville.

== 15th Squad commanders ==
- Lt. Arthur Fancy
- Lt. Susan Dalto (Denise Crosby) — An obnoxious supervisor who immediately got off on the wrong foot with the 15th Precinct when she was assigned as Fancy's replacement. Though she worked in Internal Affairs and had no field experience, she announced that because she had completed the qualification course for supervisors she was already capable of running a detective squad. She criticized Fancy to his face and to the other detectives, though the detectives liked and respected him. She criticized in full view of the squad the wardrobe choices of her female detectives, such as deciding unilaterally that the heels on their shoes were too high for running if they had to chase suspects. She announced immediate changes to partner assignments with no initial observation of how current assignments were working. She hinted to Sipowicz that she intended to have him fired or transferred. Dalto was a lesbian, and John Irvin knew her from a gay police officers' association; he disliked her so much he threatened to quit if she stayed. McDowell asked Fancy if she could transfer out, even though she was a recent arrival, but Fancy counseled her to stay so she did not acquire a reputation as someone who could not get along with her bosses. When it became clear that Dalto was making the squad dysfunctional, Fancy called in a final favor from Bass before Bass retired, which resulted in Dalto's immediate transfer. She angrily accused Fancy of arranging her removal, but deflated when Fancy pointed out what a horrible job she had done and told her to leave.
- Lt. Tony Rodriguez (Esai Morales) Rodriguez was assigned as 15th squad commander after the detectives all but rebelled against Lt. Arthur Fancy's replacement, Lt. Susan Dalto. Fancy called in one last favor from Captain Bass, who had Dalto transferred out and Rodriguez transferred in. Rodriguez had previously been a part of the Narcotics squad where he was a successful undercover officer; the squad (except for Andy) became excited that their new boss was a "living legend". Andy was initially scornful, with their differences coming largely from the fact that Rodriguez was a "hands on" supervisor. When Rodriguez intervened while Andy was interrogating a suspect, Andy reminded him that being a boss was different than being a detective, which Rodriguez accepted as fair criticism. Andy's disputes with Rodriguez were generally addressed quickly and it was clear there was a lot of mutual respect between the two men.

Tony's past in Narcotics came back to haunt him when a vengeful dealer he had arrested got out and attacked Tony's mother. Tony steamrolled the other cops working the case and eventually forced the criminal to confess to his new crime at gunpoint, which he lied about during the subsequent trial. In Season 10, Tony reconnected with his ex-wife, who had left him when she was addicted to drugs. Though she initially claimed to be clean and Tony adamantly ignored reality to defend her, he discovered she was using again and demanded she seek treatment. She ended up fleeing again and was later found dead of an overdose. Tony initially demanded a homicide investigation, and angrily accused a man who was also an ex-husband of being involved in the death. The facts eventually became clear, and Tony faced the reality of her self-inflicted demise.
Tony came into conflict with Captain Fraker, an Internal Affairs investigator who carried a grudge against Tony and tried to have him fired. Fraker's machinations nearly cost Tony his command in season 9, but Andy shut down Fraker's vendetta by threatening to reveal that Fraker was having an affair with one of his female subordinates. Word of Fraker's corruption eventually got out. After his dirty dealings were exposed and his career and marriage were ruined, he blamed Tony. Following a late night confrontation in Tony's office, Fraker suddenly shot him; Fraker moved to fire again, but Det. Rita Ortiz shot Fraker and prevented him from killing Tony. Fraker was acquitted of attempted murder thanks to an underhanded defense by lawyer James Sinclair. Tony was subsequently passed over for promotion to captain and decided to retire from the police and take a lucrative job as head of site security for a real estate development company. Although Tony and Rita began a personal relationship at about the time he left the squad, it was unclear, though suggested they were still dating. When she reached out to a fellow officer that had previously expressed interest, he attempted to finally persuade her to date him. She declined which suggested she remained in a relationship with Rodriguez.

- Lt. Shanley (Alan Feinstein) — Filled in for Lt. Rodriguez when Rodriguez was suspended after Fraker's attempt to frame him. During his brief tenure, Shanley engaged in not-so-subtle sexual harassment of Det. McDowell, who threatened to punch him if he continued. Shanley departed after Rodriguez's suspension was lifted and he resumed command.
- Sgt. Eddie Gibson (John F. O'Donohue) — Eddie was a blustering acquaintance of Andy's who had known him when he was drinking. He got Andy to date his niece Cynthia after Sylvia's death in spite of Andy's reluctance. Eddie was a longtime third grade detective on the night shift, but he requested transfer to the 15th's day tour in Season 9. Andy found out from Cynthia that Eddie had moved to days because he was hoping for a promotion; he was suffering from colon cancer and afraid his family would not be able to live on his third grade pension and benefits if he retired or died. Andy and Lt. Rodriguez then gave Gibson credit for a major arrest, which resulted in his advancement by two steps to detective first grade, after which Eddie left the 15th Squad to treat his cancer. Gibson and his wife raised foster children, and Sipowicz and Clark asked for his assistance to place an abused teenage boy Clark wanted to help; Gibson and his wife ended up agreeing to become the boy's foster parents. In Season 11, Eddie shocked everyone when he got promoted to the leadership position in the 15th after Rodriguez left, because he had passed the sergeant's exam after his cancer treatment, and there were not enough Lieutenants to fill command slots following the September 11, 2001 terrorist attacks (which were referenced on the show). Subsequent events revealed that Gibson received the assignment because he was friendly with the deputy chief for personnel, who was the uncle of Stan Hatcher, a detective with a questionable reputation; as part of receiving the command, Gibson agreed to take Hatcher at the 15th Squad. Eddie initially took a hands-off approach as boss, which was fine when he let the cops work their cases but not when he let Hatcher nearly ruin Andy's career. As time went on, he took a more assertive approach, and began to earn the grudging respect of the squad. Eddie's departure was explained in Season 12 when the newly assigned Lt. Bale said that Gibson had been reassigned because the 15th had been designated a rogue unit in need of reform.
- Lt. Thomas Bale — Bale replaced Gibson as squad commander at the beginning of Season 12. A former internal affairs officer, his original orders were to bring the supposed rogue unit into line. To this end, he cut down on overtime, fined officers who broke even the smallest rules, and chewed out anyone who didn't follow procedures 100 percent. The senior members of the squad, Sipowicz and Medavoy, believed he intended to ensure their retirement. He eagerly encouraged Andy to take the sergeant's exam; passing would mean a uniformed assignment, removing him from the detective squad. When Medavoy violated policy by moonlighting as a bar bouncer, Bale brought formal disciplinary charges against him instead of informally resolving the situation, causing Medavoy to question his desire to remain a detective. During an investigation into attacks on married men who were secretly gay, Sipowicz came across Bale's credit card in a suspect's apartment. When Andy returned it to a stunned Bale and told him he had no intention of looking into the circumstances, Bale's attitude changed. He remained an all-business supervisor, but trusted the detectives to run their cases and use their own judgment. Towards the end of the season Bale was shot during a raid and Sipowicz, now a uniformed sergeant, was ordered back to the detective squad temporarily to run the investigation. When Bale discovered he might not be able to return, he recommended Sipowicz as his replacement. In the series finale, Bale visited Andy during his first day as the new boss and encouraged him by saying he would have no problem doing the day-to-day job or protecting his people, and would figure out how to deal with the NYPD brass as he went along. Played by Currie Graham, who had previously appeared in another role.
- Lt. Jeff Henry (Sam McMurray)—A floating supervisor who worked in precincts when they were shorthanded. Assigned to the 15th to fill in for Bale after Bale was shot, he was a lax boss, and was primarily interested in playing golf. Henry's disinterest in actively running the detective squad served as a motivator for Sipowicz, who took up Bale on his offer to recommend Sipowicz as his permanent replacement.
- Sgt. Andy Sipowicz

== Other supervisors ==
- Insp. Aiello (Andy Romano) — Where most superiors on Blue tended to be either wonderful (Bass) or horrible (Haverill), Aiello was a centrist: he sided with a task force that pushed Bobby out of the way on a major case, but later gave the green light for Bobby to take over (which led to the arrest of a serial killer) and also authorized the 15th to ignore the FBI and follow up a lead on a kidnapping case.
- Captain Clifford Bass (Larry Joshua) — Bass takes over as zone commander after the forced retirement of Captain Haverill. Unlike his predecessor, he quickly establishes that he values honest communication and evaluates performance based on merit. Bass was a patrol command veteran but was new to the Detective division, leading to some initial misjudgments. After pulling Simone and Sipowicz off of a stakeout to reduce overtime and the subsequent botching of the suspect interview, Bass acknowledged to Simone and Sipowicz that he had been in error and thanked them for "bailing him out" by solving the case and effecting an arrest. It quickly became clear that Bass trusted the detectives, listened to good advice, and viewed Fancy as a superb leader. He was tough but fair, finding a compromise when Fancy and a bigoted cop faced off and later ordering severe discipline against an out-of-control Danny. In Season 8, it was revealed that his wife's mental illness was causing her to attack herself so she could get attention by calling the police. Bass retired so he could help her, but first helped Fancy get promoted to captain. In his final act before retiring, he arranged for Fancy's replacement Susan Dalto to be transferred out when her initial actions undermined the squad.
- Captain Haverill (James Handy) — A deeply hateful, imperious leader who did not want Lt. Fancy in charge of the 15th's detectives. It was initially thought that Haverill wanted Fancy gone to promote one of his own loyalists (whom Andy derided as part of the "Chowder Society"), but it was later discovered that Haverill was a racist who hated African-American police who were too smart and talented to be pushed aside, particularly Fancy. He tried unsuccessfully to get Fancy removed only to be thwarted by Andy, whom he also hated. To weaken Fancy's team, Haverill initiated an IAB investigation against Kelly. When the probe turned up nothing Haverill could use, but Kelly responded to Haverill's provocations in an insubordinate manner, Haverill used his power to demote Kelly to a humiliating dispatch position, after which Kelly resigned from the force. During an undercover operation to stop a planned armored car heist, Haverill tried to use one of Fancy's old informants to hook the 15th on bogus information involving a Russian mafia boss. Fancy figured out the plan, and got his informant to record Haverill making incriminating statements (specifically one calling Fancy a "nigger"). Following the successful bust of the armored car robbers, Fancy played the tape for an aghast Haverill, and gave him two choices; retire immediately, or become the defendant in Fancy's lawsuit, where the tape would be Exhibit A. Haverill grudgingly accepted retirement. In Season 5, it was revealed he had become an FBI consultant. He used this role to organize a vendetta that nearly cost Bobby, Andy and Fancy their jobs before they realized what he was doing and solved the case.
- Chief of Detectives Duffy (James Martin Kelly) — Appeared in Season 12. Following the shooting of Lt. Bale, Duffy ordered Sipowicz off uniformed sergeant's duty and back to the detective squad temporarily to take charge of the investigation. After the case was closed and Bale was unable to return to work, Bale offered to recommend Sipowicz as his replacement. Sipowicz overcame his initial hesitation and took Bale up on his offer. At the department social event which included Medavoy's retirement ceremony, Duffy met privately with Sipowicz and allowed him to make the argument for why he should succeed Bale. Duffy appreciated Sipowicz's skills, so despite his initial misgivings, he agreed to give Sipowicz the command. In the show's final episode, Sipowicz disobeys Duffy's orders and keeps a murder investigation open because he is sure the man who confessed is innocent. Sipowicz is proved right, but Duffy still yells at him within earshot of the rest of the detectives for not closing the case as ordered, and threatens to fire him if he disobeys orders again. Bale hears the end of the exchange, and afterwards tells Sipowicz that he did a good job by taking a loud verbal reprimand without complaint in order to protect his detectives from the higher ups and achieve the correct result in the case, and that to succeed in the long term, he will have get used to diplomatically handling his bosses.

== Assistant DAs ==
- Laura Michaels Kelly (Sherry Stringfield) — The ex-wife of Det. John Kelly, they were amiable enough after their divorce to spend the night together on several occasions, but finally decided that their pattern of sex and fighting needed to end. Laura was an assistant DA when a sleazy supervisor pressured her to lie about a dying witness' final words, but she used a recording of the conversation as leverage to get a transfer to a position enabling her to work with the 15th's detectives. She told Kelly she had begun dating a doctor (played by Kyle Secor), and later that she felt she was being followed. She then got angry at Kelly for interviewing the doctor about the possible stalking, causing Kelly to tell her to go to someone else for help. However, Kelly still identified the mobsters who had ordered Laura's murder. He then confronted them in prison and made clear that if anything happened to her, he would retaliate. After John Kelly's departure, Laura was not mentioned again.
- Sylvia Costas
- Leo Cohen (Michael B. Silver) — A sarcastic young ADA who quickly ran afoul of the 15th's cops for reasons ranging from snidely referring to secret love affairs (Bobby and Diane) to implying widespread brutality (Andy) and bad judgment (Lt. Fancy), Leo nevertheless showed he cared about the law and was able to sometimes work well with the 15th's top cops. He dated Jill but ruined that relationship with his jealousy. Leo later entered private practice and in season 8 briefly represented Andy, Diane, and Greg over bogus corruption charges, then returned to the DA's office in Season 11 to unsuccessfully prosecute a murder case.
- Valerie Haywood (Garcelle Beauvais) — She became the full-time ADA for the 15th after Leo Cohen left in Season 8. While she was smart and tough, she initially alienated Andy with her rigid rule-book approach, and often showed judgmental tendencies that Sylvia Costas had generally avoided when dealing with cops. Over time, she began to work more harmoniously with the detectives, though she was consistently reluctant to seek as many prosecutions as the detectives pushed for. She was attracted to Baldwin Jones and they dated in Seasons 8 and 9; when she thought she was pregnant and later had a miscarriage, their suspicions and lack of personal chemistry sank the relationship. When they resumed dating in Season 10, Baldwin tried to help her when an angry ex-con she had prosecuted began stalking her and later had one of his friends beat her up (Medavoy found the links to arrest both men, which prevented Baldwin from seeking revenge). After losing a slam-dunk case relating to Lt. Rodriguez's shooting, she appeared in fewer episodes and was written out of the show after Season 11. Played by Garcelle Beauvais-Nilon.
- Lori Munson (Elizabeth Lackey) — ADA Munson became the full-time ADA in Season 12. She was initially furious at John Clark when his actions ruined a murder case, but she later forgave him when he cleaned up his act and helped salvage something from that case. They also began dating and were still doing so when the show ended. Her father was a powerful and meddlesome businessman named Owen; he looked down on Clark, and tried to interfere in their relationship.

== PAAs ==
- Donna Abandando — The first squad police administrative aide (PAA), Donna initially appeared to be a bleached-blonde bimbo, but quickly won over the 15th with her skills and won over Det. Medavoy with her beauty and charm. They began dating and even lived together until Greg's jealousy ruined things in Season 2. Near the end of Season 3, Donna decided to take a job at Apple Computer Inc., and moved to California. Played by Gail O'Grady.
- Geri Turner — One of two PAAs who joined the 15th in Season 4 after Donna and John left, she annoyed Andy with her constant sexual innuendos and odd behavior. Lt. Fancy had her transferred to Anti-Crime. Andy did sympathize with her during a case where a man Geri had been having an S&M-heavy relationship with died during a sexual encounter, and the 15th's detectives had to investigate. Played by Debra Christofferson
- Gina Colon — The other new PAA in Season 4, Gina caught the eye of Det. Martinez and they began dating. She was beaten and her face slashed by an attacker, and James stayed by her side during her recovery. She later got pregnant in Season 5, and she married him shortly before their son, James Martinez Jr., was born. Played by Lourdes Benedicto
- Naomi Reynolds — A PAA with a pronounced Southern accent who appeared during Season 5 as Gina's replacement. It was revealed she was actually an illegal immigrant from Australia who was forced to resign her job when the INS found out about her. She was later allowed to stay in the U.S. and continue to pursue her dream of becoming an American policewoman by working as a security guard. Played by Gabrielle Fitzpatrick
- Dolores Mayo — The pretty young woman who took over after Naomi's departure, Dolores wanted to be a dancer and liked to take frequent cigarette breaks during her workdays. However, in Season 6, she was revealed to have serious emotional issues which led to self-destructive behavior, from working as a stripper to shoplifting, to lashing out against her police department supervisors. She died of a drug overdose that turned out to be an intentional homicide, and her father later admitted that her problems stemmed from his molestation of her when she was younger. Played by Lola Glaudini, who had appeared twice before in other roles.
- John Irvin — John appeared for the first time in Season 2 as a temporary replacement for Donna; he was friends with Bobby Simone from their previous work at 1 Police Plaza. He returned as Dolores' permanent replacement. Andy's homophobia initially led him to be rude to John. Over time, John and Andy became good friends, to the point of John babysitting for Andy's son Theo and keeping Andy's hair in trim, and Andy sub-leasing his apartment to John when he and Theo moved in with Connie. John was shot and nearly killed in Season 6 when trying to counsel Dolores Mayo's grieving father, the same incident in which Sylvia was killed. Andy's respect for John continued to grow; when Andy and Connie got married, John obtained minister's credentials from an online church so he could officiate. He had a poor relationship with his bigoted father that healed when they made peace not long before his father's death. John and his sister received sizable inheritances, but John continued to work. John's knowledge of art, music, antiques, and fashion sometimes enabled him to make contributions that helped detectives solve cases, as did his knowledge of psychology and interpersonal relationships. His obsession with punctuality and professional behavior also endeared him to Lieutenant Fancy, because it contrasted with the unreliability of most of his predecessors. Played by Bill Brochtrup.

== Informants ==
- Steve Richards — A low-level snitch and local con artist that appeared occasionally in Seasons 2 and 3. Steve once ruined a police surveillance operation when the suspects offered him a cut of the proceeds from a planned robbery. No one wanted to listen to him when he returned, and he always wrapped his information in innuendo and double-talk, but what he revealed helped save a kidnapped business executive and earn him a hefty reward. Played by Paul Ben-Victor.
- Vinnie Greco — Lt. Fancy's top snitch, who provided information that enabled Fancy to effect an arrest early in his career that resulted in Fancy earning his detective's shield. Vinnie returned in Season 2 with info about plans for an elaborate robbery involving military weapons. He was roped into informing on Fancy for bigoted Cmdr. Haverill, but turned into Fancy's snitch again when his ruse was discovered. He got Haverill to make racist statements about Fancy on tape after the successful bust, which Fancy used to force Haverill to retire. Played by Joe Pantoliano.
- J.B. Murphy — J.B. loved doo-wop music, giving data to Danny Sorensen, and drugs. While he was a top-level snitch at first, he spiraled back into his addictions in spite of Danny's desperate efforts to help, and died when he overdosed inside a building that was later burned down with his still-breathing body inside. Played by Jeff Cahill.
- Julian Pisano — A sleazy and unlikeable low-level criminal whose initial interaction with the 15th's detectives was to provide details which led them to arrest Danny's killer. Andy and Clark later found out Julian's wife was trying to kill him and got him to set aside his tendencies towards low level crime and get rich quick schemes long enough to help them to arrest her. Played by Lenny Venito, who had previously appeared on the show in another role.
- Ferdinand Hollie — A stick-up artist and drug addict dubbed by Simone as his best informant ever. Hollie caught AIDS through his heroin addiction and specialized in robbing drug dealers, while leaving ordinary citizens alone. He made Sipowicz and Lt. Fancy uncomfortable with his illegal activities, but they turned a blind eye because he played a crucial role in bringing down the Barnes crew, which was being investigated by a Federal Drug Task Force led by Sgt. Ray Kahlins. Kahlins later revealed Hollie's identity in an interrogation as retaliation for Hollie having made the task force look incompetent during a drug raid; Hollie then died at the hands of the Barnes crew. Hollie was regarded by Sipowicz as more stand-up than Kahlins, and Hollie's death caused Simone to beat Kahlins in the presence of the task force. Hollie was created by David Simon, later the producer of The Wire, and foreshadows Simon's later creation, Omar Little; Hollie shared Omar's high-risk occupation of robbing drug dealers, his faithfulness to his own personal code of ethics, and his willingness to work with the police as an informant. Both were inspired by the same group of Baltimore street desperadoes that Simon knew from his crime reporting days, and Hollie's name references two of those figures, Ferdinand Harvin and Anthony Hollie. Played by Giancarlo Esposito, who later appeared on the show in another role.

== Internal affairs ==
- Det. Kevin Sullivan - A recruit who graduated from the police academy with John Kelly, at the start of his career he caught his partner stealing money from dead bodies and turned him in. As a result, Sullivan was relegated to Internal Affairs because as a "rat", no other officers would associate with him, including Kelly. Sullivan had a passion for the bagpipes, but because of the freeze-out, the Emerald Society's pipers' band wouldn't even let him audition. As a result, he ended most work days by stopping at a nearby cemetery to play alone. During the investigation of corrupt police officer Jack Hanlon, Kelly reconnects with Sullivan at the cemetery to seek his advice. Sullivan recommends wearing a recording device to obtain a confession, since the circumstantial evidence against Hanlon isn't enough to take action. As an established detective, Kelly decides to do it himself so that the less experienced Martinez, whose brother lived in the building Hanlon manages, won't gain a reputation as a "rat". After Hanlon confesses and is arrested for several deaths, Kelly visits Sullivan a second time to apologize for having ignored him since his move to Internal Affairs. Sullivan expresses his appreciation for Kelly's willingness to protect Martinez - something no one did for Sullivan. Sullivan asks Kelly to stay a few minutes so that at even if he can't be in the band, at least one other cop will have heard him play. Though no one else on the police force knows, Sullivan is as talented as anyone in the band, and he plays a beautiful, lilting Irish lullaby as Kelly and he watch the sun setting on the city skyline. Played by John Bolger.
- Sgt. Jerry Martens — Originally appeared as a one-dimensional "Rat Squad" leader who was happy to ruin Det. Kelly's career, earning him hatred from Sipowicz which never fully disappeared. However, over time Martens was revealed to be a decent cop who viewed his role in IAB as a way to protect good cops and give 'bad' ones a fair investigation into extenuating circumstances; as such, he becomes a sometimes-ally to the 15th squad. In Season 3, he and Simone run intersecting investigations based on Simone's former friend, Ray DiSalvo, who was looking to trade information for a reduced sentence. Though Simone was close to breaking the case on his own, Martens interrupted and used IAB to arrest a smug detective who'd arranged for the robbery that killed two retired cops. Simone initially chafed at the intervention, until Martens revealed that DiSalvo had approached them earlier with all of the details and attempted to sell out Simone as well; Martens exercised his own judgment in not pursuing a case against Simone, telling him philosophically that "Everything's a situation". Martens assisted Sipowicz in obtaining information about Fraker from internal affairs, which Sipowicz used to force Fraker to end a vendetta against Rodriguez. He also aided in exposing the corrupt Detective Stan Hatcher, which caused Hatcher to quit the police department. Martens' first name wasn't revealed until a casual mention of it in Season 12. Played by Scott Allan Campbell.
- Captain Pat Fraker — A corrupt Internal Affairs officer who used his position to harass Rodriguez. Fraker got stuck in Internal Affairs after a report from Rodriguez which contained no officer's names exposed a bunch of corrupt officers, including Fraker's Narcotics partner; other cops assumed the "rat" had been Fraker (since he knew of the corruption but didn't partake in it), so IAB became the only unit where he could work without being harassed. Fraker attempted to sabotage Rodriguez and the 15th Precinct's detective squad. Sipowicz ended the harassment by obtaining from Martens details about Fraker's corrupt actions, including an affair with a subordinate, then threatening to tell Fraker's wife and supervisor. After Fraker's secrets were later exposed by someone else, he was passed over for promotion to deputy inspector and his marriage ended. He blamed Rodriguez and tried to kill him during a confrontation in Rodriguez's office; after Fraker shot Rodriguez, Rita Ortiz shot him before he could fire a second time. Rodriguez and Fraker survived, but Fraker was left permanently disabled. He was acquitted at trial after an unsavory defense by shady attorney James Sinclair. Fraker's acquittal led to Rodriguez being passed over for promotion to captain, then retiring to take a lucrative private security job. Despite avoiding a criminal conviction, the shooting, the trial, and the prior revelation of Fraker's other indiscretions left his career and reputation in ruins and, along with the injuries he suffered, ultimately contributed to him leaving the force in disgrace. He later worked in a sleazy bar, where he had an angry confrontation with Sipowicz during Sipowicz's attempt to determine who had been menacing him (which turned out to be Stan Hatcher). Played by Casey Siemaszko, who had previously appeared in another role.

== Other police ==
- Officer Janice Licalsi — Began a sexual relationship with Det. Kelly in Season 1, when a mob boss told her to get close to Kelly (who had been shutting down his businesses) and kill him. Janice instead killed the mob boss and his driver, and later was blackmailed by the mob into doing some illegal work for them, which was authorized by her sleazy, ambitious boss. Janice was legally free when Kelly destroyed evidence of her guilt, but her own conscience led her to confess to a priest and then turn herself in for the killings. She was acquitted of second-degree murder charges and convicted of manslaughter early in Season 2. Played by Amy Brenneman. Janice would have returned later if not for David Caruso's departure from the series, as Brenneman noted her character was a "mob chick" who didn't have any room for stories in the absence of Caruso's Det. John Kelly.
- Officer Roy Larson — A hot-tempered, workout-obsessed uniformed officer who partnered with Licalsi in the middle of Season 1 and showed himself to be a subpar cop when he screwed up the arrest of a rapist and left the victim needing to tell her husband (who blamed her). (The fact that the case was closed did nothing to improve Larson's abilities or his attitude.) Licalsi rebuffed Larson's efforts to date her, for which he blamed Kelly. Larson's erratic behavior resulted in his supervisors directing him to undergo a drug test; he tested positive for steroids and methamphetamine, and was immediately fired. He blamed Kelly for his firing, and instigated a fight with Kelly and Sipowicz in the main lobby of the precinct headquarters. Kelly punched Larson, knocked him down, and left him with a bloody lip and nose. After this altercation, Larson left and was not seen at the precinct again. Played by John Wesley Shipp.
- Desk Sgt Vinnie Agostini — The One-Five Desk Sergeant. Generally got along well with the 15th's detectives, at one point furiously lambasting two corrupt plainclothes cops who had been robbing drug dealers before being arrested by Kelly and Sipowicz. Played by Vincent Guastaferro.
- Insp. Anthony Lastarza — The sleazy, ambitious OCCB boss who forced Janice to work for the mobsters (and coldly shut down her efforts to confess to killing Marino and his driver by stating a mob hitman had claimed credit for those killings and "those cases are closed, period") and later clashed with Andy and Kelly over his treatment of a mob informant case. He rode his dubious successes out of the NYPD and into an off-screen job with the DEA. Played by Tom Towles.
- Detective Mike Roberts — In Season 1, he was part of the detective squad but was disliked by Lt. Fancy and appeared to be a subpar performer. Roberts had a sexual relationship with a drug-addicted informant, who threatened to call his wife to reveal their affair. After an altercation with Mike, she committed suicide and left a diary that talked of wanting to get clean and being kept in drugs and violence by Roberts. The circumstances were suspicious, and the entire matter was enough for Fancy to force him to quit the job at a reduced pension (Roberts' other choice was to fight the charges and face Fancy's threat to terminate him without any severance). Roberts became a private investigator and second-rate "security consultant" whose work sometimes brought him back to the 15th Precinct, and usually made him look worse than ever. He finally tried to do a good deed in Season 6 when he nearly confessed to Sipowicz about a murder-for-hire plot he was being blackmailed into by Malcolm Cullinan; the intended victim was John Irvin. Roberts gave Irvin a veiled warning, which came shortly before Roberts was himself murdered. A badly-written book of fictionalized detective stories Roberts penned gave clues to the blackmail plot and Roberts' murder, and led to Cullinan's arrest. His last mention on the show came in the S8 episode "Dying to Testify", where a homicide case he closed against a murderous drug dealer is reopened with tragic results, and Diane Russell responds to ADA Haywood's mention of him by stating he used to work at the 15th but is now dead. Played by Michael Harney.
- Detective Sharon LaSalle — She had attended the police academy with John Kelly, and transferred into the 15th Precinct in Season 1 to work as a detective. Her husband Danny, a retired police officer in charge of public safety at a city university, was killed while trying to stop a robbery on her first day at the 15th. She was later offered a position as an investigator in the department's Equal Employment Opportunity office. After being assaulted by a suspect during an interview, she decided that the raise that came with promotion to Detective First Grade and the regular hours that enabled her to spend more time with her children made the EEO opportunity too good to pass up; she accepted, and was not seen again at the 15th Precinct. Played by Wendy Makkena.
- Detective Art Stillwell — An aging, fat Detective seen in Season 1 as a part of the 15th squad. Stillwell had a crippling gambling addiction that would often wipe out much of his paycheck and would play practical jokes that often irritated the other officers of the 15th. After losing his entire pension and the rest of his money, Stillwell played a final practical joke, which led Lt. Fancy to send him to a mental hospital and out of the 15th for good. Played by John Capodice.
- Detective Vince Gotelli — A night shift detective and union delegate. Near the end of season 4, he stole and crashed an unattended city bus while the driver ran into a store for a bathroom break. It was revealed that Gotelli was drunk and depressed over health problems which would force him to retire when he was only two months away from reaching 30 years of service and qualifying for a higher pension. Fancy met with the bus driver's boss, and they agreed to keep both Gotelli and the bus driver out of trouble. Fancy then informed Gotelli that he needed to retire immediately with a pension for medical disability. Gotelli later had heart surgery and made a full recovery, after which he returned to work as a claims investigator for an insurance company. Played by Carmine Caridi.
- Det. Nick Savino — A capable, successful narcotics officer who accidentally arrested Andy Jr. in Season 1 because he resembled a drug dealer Savino was investigating, then helped free him without charges. Savino later helped Andy on a murder case involving a store Andy had worked at when he was a kid, and with murders at an apartment building Bobby inherited. Played by Steve Antin.
- Officer Mike Shannon — A uniformed cop who was the main "man in blue" that the 15th's detectives tended to interact with when arriving at a crime scene. While he was generally a stand-up guy who helped the detectives when he could (he helped find Andy's assailant and saved his career, and turned in a corrupt fellow officer who had framed Clark Jr.), he sometimes clashed with the detectives, mostly in cases where the detectives suspected that uniform cops had done something wrong. He was afraid that he would be forced out of the department after he cleared Clark Jr.'s name by admitting knowledge of Laughlin's attempt to frame Clark Jr., but subsequent appearances showed he remained on the job, and was a well-regarded officer at the 15th. Played by James Luca McBride.
- Officer Miller — In addition to Shannon, one of the uniformed officers most likely to be in charge of a crime scene when detectives arrived. Played by Billy Concha.
- Josh Astrachan & N.D. "Hank" Harold — A white-and-black pair of plainclothes Anti-Crime cops, they were mostly on hand to take care of babysitting suspects and witnesses, and to handle unpleasant tasks the detectives and uniformed cops tried to avoid, such as monitoring a suspect who had swallowed balloons full of drugs so they could be collected as evidence after the suspect passed them. Played by Ray LaTulipe and Henry Murph.
- Officer Abby Sullivan — A uniformed officer who met and became friends with Greg Medavoy in Season 4 when the portly detective undertook a fitness regimen to shed excess pounds. Greg later asked her out, only to learn she was a lesbian, but they remained friends and Abby and her partner Kathy decided they wanted Greg to be a sperm donor so Abby could have a child. Greg was unsure about this, but eventually did make a donation and Abby did get pregnant. In Season 5, Kathy was murdered during a fake robbery that was set up by her bitter ex-lover, and Abby resolved to be a single mother, with Greg promising he would be there to help her if she needed him. She gave birth off-screen late in Season 5 and was never seen or mentioned again. Played by Paige Turco.
- Lt. Joe Abner — A bitter African-American lieutenant who previously commanded Baldwin Jones in the Bias Incident Investigation Unit. Abner held a grudge against Fancy over Fancy's refusal to get rid of Andy Sipowicz for his racist attitudes, but later revealed he steered Jones to Fancy's command so Jones could learn from a good boss in a position (general squad work) he was more suited for than judging whether cases involved hate crimes. Abner was depressed over the belief that his work had not done anything to change racism in the department, and he committed suicide, which had a negative effect on the emotions of both Fancy and Jones—they both knew if they had liked Abner more they would have interceded to get him help. Played by James Pickens Jr., who had previously appeared in another role.
- Sgt. Bill Dornan — Another bitter African-American officer who did not like Andy based on a racist remark he once heard Andy make to a homeless black panhandler, as well as Andy seeking to re-open a murder case (at Sylvia's instigation) that Dornan had cleared. A convicted murderer, Suarez, told Sylvia that he had falsely confessed to prevent the real killer from retaliating against his family. Dornan overcame his initial anger at Sipowicz's second-guessing and told him that maybe Suarez had confessed too easily and Sipowicz should re-open the case. Sipowicz informed Sylvia, but by then Suarez had been murdered in prison to prevent him from officially recanting; subsequent events revealed that Suarez had been bribed and coerced into confessing, and while he was in prison, he was regularly beaten and raped, while the real killer carried on an affair with Suarez's wife. Dornan later got demoted; Andy worried that it was over Dornan's handling of the Suarez case, but in fact the demotion was unrelated. Dornan later fell into heavy drinking and left the job, leading Fancy and Andy to try to help him; Dornan was last seen in the Season 6 finale, making a concerted effort to stay sober and telling Fancy that in the aftermath of Sylvia's death, Andy was a "tough guy" who "will be all right". Talking to Dornan made Andy realize that Andy's father was not a victim of unprovoked violence at the hands of a black man, as Andy had believed, but a drunken bigot who was attacked by a black man who was defending himself. This realization caused Andy to begin questioning his own racist attitudes, which he began to moderate. Dornan was in some ways a black version of Andy, possessing several of the same traits—gruffness, pride, suspicion of authority figures, alcoholism, and racist attitudes—that initially defined Andy's character. Played by Richard Gant.
- Officer Mary Franco — In Season 7, Danny met her on a murder case and they soon began sleeping together. Mary was nice but brittle, and Danny showed little interest in sharing details of his messed-up life with her, preferring to do so with Diane Russell (something Mary noticed). They broke up when Danny hit bottom over an informant's death, then got back together on rocky terms, before Danny finally did the right thing and broke up with her for good early in Season 8, after which she left the 15th. Played by Sheeri Rappaport.
- Officer Ed Laughlin — On the same case where Danny met Mary, they also met Ed, who was upset about turning in two other uniformed cops for beating a punk to death. Ed later interfered with a case Jill was working, taunting an abusive drunk until he ended up killing his wife and leaving his children parentless. This led Kirkendall to confront him in a bar. When the much larger Laughlin menacingly moved toward her, Kirkendall stayed put, telling Laughlin that she was "standing right in front of [him]." In Season 9, Ed ran afoul of Clark Jr. by making advances on recently widowed Rita Ortiz, leading to a boxing challenge where Clark beat Laughlin despite Laughlin's low blows and other attempts to cheat. In Season 10, Andy and Clark found out Ed had been having sex with an underage auxiliary cop and ignored her pleas for help on a stalking complaint which later led to her death. The detectives gave Laughlin a choice: retire immediately or face an IAB investigation. He resigned, and Clark Jr. later discussed the case with his father. Clark Sr. informed on Laughlin to IAB, and Clark Jr. tried to make things right by trying to get IAB to reinstate Laughlin. Despite returning to work as a police officer, Laughlin blamed Clark Jr. for his troubles, and responded by planting heroin in Clark's car, followed by an anonymous call that resulted in Clark's arrest. Shannon was aware of what Laughlin had done, and eventually decided to turn him in, which resulted in Laughlin's arrest, followed by Clark's release from jail and return to duty. Played by Anthony Mangano.
- Det. Harry Denby — A sleazy narcotics officer who was working the case that involved the drug dealers that Don Kirkendall was associated with. He later helped fake Don's death so they could deal drugs together. He was suspended from the force and began working at a courier company, where he put together a new drug ring and began an affair that ended with him killing his girlfriend and her husband. When a sting in Brooklyn led to him killing two dealers and wounding an undercover DEA agent, Diane Russell stepped in and shot him in a suicide-by-cop. Played by Scott Cohen.
- Sgt. Ray Kahlins — The head of a combined NYPD-federal drug task force that worked with the 15th investigating drug gangs. An alcoholic loudmouth and liar regarded by Sipowicz as a "hump" with inept investigative skills, Kahlins was more often concerned with raking in overtime pay than in making good cases, and was held in low regard by both his task force and the 15th's detectives, though he appeared to be able to make major cases based on his good relationship with the U.S. Attorney. He clashed with Sipowicz and Simone over lies about his involvement in the Vietnam War and his exposure of informant Ferdinand Hollie, who was murdered as a result. He later appeared during a case that involved Fancy's foster son Maceo being caught while transporting heroin; Maceo agreed to become an informant, and made a controlled delivery that enabled Kahlins's task force to arrest the drug gang for whom Maceo had been working. Played by Daniel von Bargen.
- Det. John Clark Sr. — John Clark Jr.'s father. An average detective from a low crime precinct mutually despised by Sipowicz, who called him "Dutch Boy" in reference to a plaster marketing statue he once shot in the dark thinking it was a suspect with a gun. He threw his son out of the house when John Jr. decided to work at the 15th with Andy; his partner and he later worked a case with Clark Jr. and Andy that revealed Clark Sr.'s by-the-book approach and hyper-sensitivity to his son being anything like Andy. (In fact, Andy was much more the kind of detective Clark Jr. wanted to be, which is why he chose to transfer to the 15th when he earned a detective's shield and pick of assignments.) When the name "John Clark" surfaced in connection with a known prostitute, Clark Sr. let his son face the IAB accusation until Andy told him Clark Jr. was on the verge of being fired, which caused Clark Sr. to confess. After this, Clark Sr. began drinking heavily and became an IAB informant, which nearly ruined Clark Jr.'s career at the 15th. His actions helped lead to the campaign by Officer Laughlin against Clark Jr., who finally told his father to stop making bad decisions on his behalf and stop drinking so much. A depressed Clark Sr. later committed suicide, which sent his son into a long depression of his own. Played by Joe Spano.
- Sgt. McNamara — A bigoted officer who had both gone to the academy and worked with Lt. Fancy. He was the supervisor of Fancy's brother Reggie, who was involved in a verbal altercation with McNamara that seemed to be racially motivated. Fancy mediated, which resulted in a brief respite, but McNamara later aided a Haitian gypsy cab driver to file a harassment complaint against Reggie. Fancy perceived that McNamara was using the groundless complaint to have Reggie fired; McNamara claimed it was departmental procedure to take complaints from minority citizens seriously even when minority officers were accused of police harassment. Fancy recognized the racism in McNamara's actions, and took action to save Reggie's job. Played by Danny Goldring.
- Officer Reggie Fancy — Lt. Fancy's younger brother, who was not close to Arthur as evident by his failure to visit Arthur's first-born son until Arthur brought it up, who was a uniformed officer at a neighboring precinct. Reggie's willingness to complain about his supervisor's racism drew the ire of that supervisor, Sgt. McNamara. McNamara later tried to end Reggie's career by supporting a harassment complaint from a Haitian gypsy cab driver complaining that Reggie had shaken him down for money. Fancy's detectives teamed up to uncover the false story, after which Reggie seemed appreciative of his brother's help, while Fancy informed Reggie that none of the cops who saved his career were African-American, teaching Reggie a serious lesson in trust. Played by Michael Jai White.
- Officer Jack Hanlon — A retired officer who had been on the force at the same time as John Kelly Sr. Hanlon was a corrupt racist who worked part-time as the superintendent of a rent-controlled building; the landlord paid him to brutalize residents in an effort to make them move so he could replace them with better-paying tenants. Martinez's brother lived in the building, and Martinez became aware of Hanlon's bad acts, so Martinez, Sipowicz, and John Kelly Jr. investigated. Because they thought turning in another cop might get Martinez a reputation as a "snitch", Kelly obtained a recorded confession from Hanlon, because he was established enough that his reputation would not suffer. Martinez and Kelly then turned Hanlon in for the murders of two tenants, which were caused when Hanlon created incidents that initially appeared to be accidents. Played by Mitchell Ryan.
- Det. Walker — A tired, likely-alcoholic officer who appeared in the Season 1 episode "True Confessions", when Andy Sipowicz was restored by Lt. Fancy to active duty and joined him and Det. Kelly in investigating a double-murder at a liquor store. Walker did not want Andy on the case, ignored his work, and refused to listen to his concerns that they'd arrested the wrong man. When an anonymous tip about the robbery was phoned in from a local bar, Walker snidely said Andy wanted to check it out so he could drink rather than investigate, but Andy's instincts paid off when the lead ended up nabbing the man who really committed the crimes. Walker was still hostile towards Andy and asked how he was going to get screwed, but after Andy said the case was made and no one including himself would care about the wrong initial arrest, he finally apologized to Andy, and revealed that he wished he could find a way to sobriety like Andy did. Walker is mentioned once more in Season 1, as a character says the portly detective isn't able to play the 15th's Santa Claus because he's out with medical problems. Played by Robert Breuler.
- Officer Szymanski — A bigoted uniformed officer who stopped Lt. Fancy and his wife for driving in an all-White neighborhood of Bayside, Queens. Art figured that Szymanski had little interaction with Blacks working in Bayside (aside from the ones he pulled over, according to Art) and then called in a favor to send Szymanski to work in an all-Black precinct located in either Brooklyn North or Harlem as a means of teaching him to learn which Black citizens to treat with respect. Szymanski was then transferred to the all-Black neighborhood Bedford-Stuyvesant but later was transferred to the 15th when Captain Bass said it was a bad idea to put a cop who disliked black people in a problematic neighborhood like Bed-Stuy. Szymanski was later falsely accused of robbing a drug dealer and was involved in shooting an undercover Black officer, both cases where Fancy and he clashed, but in both Szymanski was later cleared. In Season 8, his cousin was killed accidentally and the brother of the dead cousin later killed a man in a drunken rage. Played by Christopher Stanley.
- Officer John McCaslin — The rookie partner of Officer Szymanski, who stopped Lt. Fancy in Queens. Seeing that McCaslin was a rookie who had merely backed up the veteran Szymanski in the traffic stop, Fancy spared him the payback that Szymanski received.
- Officer Lucas — A patrol officer at the 15th.
- Desk Sergeant Baumgartner— An obnoxious uniformed sergeant who first appeared in Season 4's "Upstairs Downstairs", when an off-duty uniformed officer named Mike Zorzi was investigated following the death of a friend for whom he had been providing security. Baumgartner whipped up anger among the uniformed officers against Andy and Bobby for investigating one of their own, but Baumgartner unintentionally revealed information that implicated Zorzi in the crime, which led to his arrest (Zorzi's friend was a courier for illegal gambling money, and Zorzi killed him to steal the cash, after which he fabricated a story about a mugger committing the crime). After Zorzi's arrest, Baumgartner acted like there had been no animosity, but Andy bluntly told him he was a mean drunk who wanted to make everyone else miserable. Baumgartner appeared again in Season 6's "Cop in a Bottle", when Andy went to him for alcohol so Andy, Diane, and Greg could "focus" Mike Walsh, an alcoholic cop who was involved in a shooting while he was off-duty; Baumgartner brought up his past with Sipowicz in a negative context, and denied drinking on the job; Andy replied that Baumgartner could either help or take a beating. Baumgartner then conceded that he did keep a flask on hand, and gave it to Andy so Andy could let the alcoholic cop have a few drinks and stop his DTs (the shooting turned out to be justified). Played by Matt Landers.
- Desk Sergeant Mahoney — A uniformed supervisor who had an altercation with Danny; Danny had requested that an informant, Nicholas, be held in jail overnight for his own protection. Mahoney decided that he needed to free up the cell to detain suspects who had been arrested and were pending booking, so he released Nicholas, who was then murdered by the suspect against whom he was informing. When Sorenson found out the next morning that Nicholas was dead, he got into a screaming match with Mahoney, which was observed by several other officers. Believing that Sorenson had undercut his authority, Mahoney approached Fancy to demand punishment. Fancy reminded Mahoney that he once caught Mahoney drinking on the job, and agreed to handle the problem unofficially. Mahoney agreed, and reminded Fancy that he had apologized to Fancy in person—"like a man"—and insisted that unofficial resolution of his dispute with Sorenson would also require an in person apology. Sorenson put it off until Fancy ordered him to do it; he then attempted to deliver his apology one-on-one. Mahoney compelled Sorenson to make the apology in full view of the 15th's uniformed officers. Sorenson did so, which Mahoney accepted as an unspoken restoration of his authority. In return, Mahoney told Sorenson that the death of Nicholas was no one person's fault, but rather the unintended consequence of unfortunate circumstances. Played by Jack McGee, who had appeared twice previously in other roles.
- Lt. Steve Graham — The commanding officer of the detective squad at the 27th Precinct (a running meta-reference to the precinct on the rival NBC drama Law & Order), Graham was an inflexible, unlikable boss. He appeared twice in Season 6 when detectives from his squad crossed paths with the 15th's detectives. The first appearance had him looking forward to ending the career of the alcoholic Detective Mike Walsh, but backing down in the face of evidence that Walsh had acted properly during a shooting (even though he had been drinking) and Lt. Fancy's anger over his crusade. The second appearance had Graham dealing with Bill Dornan, the recently demoted sergeant who brought a bad attitude to his detective's position that was matched by Graham's contempt for him, though Graham was not behind Dornan's demotion. The two detective squads handled a gun-smuggling case that led to Lt. Fancy being shot and wounded in the arm. Graham wanted to grandstand after the arrests, and deny credit to Fancy, which caused Sipowicz to lead the 15th Precinct's detectives in a boycott of the planned press conference to show solidarity with Fancy. An angry Graham then canceled the press conference. Played by Steve Rankin.
- Officer Donny Simmons — An African-American uniformed cop who like Shannon was often a first on the crime scene officer seen briefing the detectives upon their arrival. He usually got along well with the detectives but was among the uniformed officers who were upset with Sipowicz and Clark when they mistakenly believed Sipowicz and Clark had informed IAB about the numerous officers who were having sex with an underage auxiliary officer. Played by David Harris.
- Officer Maya Anderson — An attractive, extroverted, flirtatious police officer who works in Anti-Crime, she made her attraction to Baldwin Jones clear as soon as they met, and they eventually began spending time together. She found herself in trouble when the details of her story about how her partner died in a shoot-out did not line up with the recollections of the eyewitnesses. When Maya confesses that her negligence might have contributed to her partner's death, Baldwin persuades Valerie to let him remove Maya's original statement from the case file and replace it with an accurate one so that she will not be accused of perjury. Maya decides that she may not be well-suited for police work and takes time off to consider her options, after which she is not seen at the 15th precinct again. Played by Tanya Wright.

== Family, friends, and love interests ==
- Andy Sipowicz Jr. — Andy's son with Katie. Hated his father due to Andy being a drunken, abusive, non-parenting figure in his life, but began to respect his dad when he realized Andy Sr. was staying sober and was a great cop. Andy Jr. joined the Air Force, later getting an honorable discharge because of a torn rotator cuff, and then joined the Hackensack, New Jersey police department. His father taught him lessons about being a policeman until Andy Jr. was killed when he intervened in a robbery/rape, and one of the perpetrators shot him. His death sent his father into a tailspin that nearly destroyed his life. After his death, Andy Jr. appeared on occasion in dreams and visions to talk with his dad, often contentiously but always with father and son saying they loved each other. Played by Michael DeLuise.
- Lillian Fancy — Arthur's wife, who is happy and outgoing in comparison to her private and serious husband. She scared Art when she got pregnant because her diabetes nearly killed her during her pregnancy with their second daughter, but she healthily delivered a son. Worked for a natural-foods company that Art very reluctantly told his detectives about, and told him he should lighten up after Art became upset at the notion that he was forcing his subordinates to buy the items (they actually liked them and were happy to make purchases). Heard a lot about Andy over the years and decided Art had little reason to side with him over his past behavior. Played by Tamara Tunie.
- Robin Wirkus — The longtime girlfriend of Det. Kelly's shadowy, rich friend Jimmy Wexler, whom she married not long before he died because Jimmy wanted to ensure she would inherit his fortune. Slept with Det. Kelly in the Season 1 finale and they began dating between the seasons, but she broke up with him in the Season 2 premiere when she realized he was in love with Janice Licalsi. Played by Debrah Farentino.
- Benita Alden — A reporter Bobby began dating in Season 2. After she used private information from him in a story that led to a cop committing suicide, Bobby broke things off. Played by Melina Kanakaredes.
- Marie Medavoy — Greg's unpleasant wife, whom he left in Season 1 when he learned she was cheating on him. Marie and Greg would reconcile a few times, but finally got divorced in Season 4. Marie initially refused to attend their daughter's wedding if Greg was there, which caused Greg's daughter to ask him not to attend; eventually their daughter insisted that both attend and remain civil with each other, and the wedding went ahead with Marie and Greg in attendance (off-screen). Played by Deborah Taylor.
- Dr. Mondzac — A physician at Bellevue who treated James Martinez when he was shot and concealed Andy's identity when he was beaten while drunk and had his service pistol stolen, which could have led to Andy getting fired. He later examined Bobby's mentor Patsy Ferrara and determined that Patsy was suffering from Alzheimer's Disease. When Andy was diagnosed with prostate cancer, Mondzac encouraged him and helped him through the crisis. Played by Titus Welliver.
- Theo Sipowicz — Andy and Sylvia's son. Theo looked a lot like his dad and was a sweetheart who did sometimes show the kind of stubbornness that befitted a Sipowicz. He adjusted remarkably well when Sylvia was killed and later became attached to Connie, who ended up marrying Andy and forming a new family with him, Theo, her adopted daughter Michelle, and Andy and Connie's son Matthew. Played by Austin Majors.
- Katie Sipowicz — Andy's ex-wife, who initially hated him (like Andy Jr.) but later saw he was a new, different and good person (like Andy Jr.). Andy found out she had become an alcoholic after her son died and helped her find support through Alcoholics Anonymous. Katie moved in with him for a while to help take care of Theo after Sylvia died, but her hopes they would reunite romantically didn't pan out. Andy later asked her to marry him and she said yes; it was quickly apparent that Andy didn't really want to marry her, so she packed up and left after assuring Andy that they would remain friendly. Played by Debra Monk.
- Henry Coffield — The son of a woman who left Bobby her apartment building in her will. Henry was initially angry when Bobby inherited the building, because he'd counted on selling it to pay off gambling debts. Henry stayed on as the building's maintenance man. The woman who lived in the apartment he'd previously occupied was killed by drug dealers whom Henry had planned to do a deal with, but backed out when he didn't get the building. Bobby went from hating him to sort of tolerating him to later clearing him when an elderly tenant was killed and it looked at first like Henry had done it (it was a relative who wanted her money). When Bobby died, he left the building and his pigeons to Henry, and Henry later stopped to talk with Diane, revealing that Bobby had also asked him to check in on Diane after his death to make sure she was OK. Played by Willie Garson.
- Dr. Victor Carreras — The young ER doctor who took care of Bobby during his heart failure crisis in Season 6. Bobby and Diane liked and trusted him, especially when compared to the arrogant, senior-level surgeon who performed Bobby's transplant. Dr. Carreras forthrightly told Diane that Bobby would not survive his post-operative infections and the rejection of his new heart; she tearfully said she did not want her husband to suffer before he died. In Season 8, Diane ran into Dr. Carreras again and they began dating, which angered Danny Sorensen and made him jealous. Played by David Barrera.
- Cynthia Bunin — Eddie Gibson's niece, whom Eddie convinced Andy to date. They ran into each other again in Season 8 and dated until Cynthia's insecurities and Eddie's meddling led Andy to call things off. Cynthia returned in Season 9 and Andy was afraid she wanted to date again, but she had contacted him only to help Eddie confront and get treatment for his colon cancer (which Andy did; Eddie did get treated and recovered fully). Played by Juliana Donald.
- Don Harrison — Rita Ortiz's ADA husband, who quickly emerged as controlling and possibly violent. Rita found out he was cheating on her with another ADA, and she threw him out of their apartment and filed for divorce. Don insisted Rita had also cheated on him, which was untrue, and made sure to contest the divorce fully, putting a drain on Rita's emotions and finances. Don was killed by his girlfriend's husband after they resumed their affair; the husband then committed suicide. Played by Stan Cahill.
- Michael Woodruff (Andre Kinney) — A young African-American whose mother was murdered in Season 11. Baldwin was sure Michael knew his worthless father Craig (Cyrus Farmer) had committed the crime, but Michael refused to talk about it, and Baldwin served as Michael's mentor while Michael's aunt raised him. Andy finally gave Michael a talking-to that led him to turn on his dad and get him arrested. Michael became Baldwin's foster son while Craig was tried and acquitted for the crime, and later stayed with him after Craig was killed.
- Brigid Scofield — Greg Medavoy was smitten by this lovely real-estate agent when he helped bust a con man who had swindled her. They began dating and Brigid fell for Greg's goofy charm and honesty. Near the series' end, Greg retired from the police department to begin a new career working with Brigid in real estate sales. Played by Mary Page Keller.

== Adversaries ==
- James Sinclair — A brilliant, high paid, but underhanded defense attorney. Usually found defending the worst criminals, the exception came in Season 2 when he defended Officer Licalsi, and obtained a manslaughter conviction instead of a guilty verdict on first degree murder, as the prosecutors had argued. Sinclair appeared for the last time defending crooked IAB Captain Pat Fraker and getting him acquitted for the shooting of Lt. Tony Rodriguez. Played by Daniel Benzali.
- Alphonse Giardella — A gross mobster with a bad toupee, who hated Andy and was hated by him. He set up an ambush for Andy by luring him with a prostitute after he had been drinking; Giardella then emerged from hiding and shot Andy several times. Giardella was later arrested for the crime but became a prosecution witness; he was killed by a mob hitman before he could testify. Played by Robert Costanzo.
- Kwasi Oloshula — Formerly known as Kenny Parker, Kwasi was a community activist who organized a basketball game in memory of a young boy who had died in police custody, only to have the game taken over by local drug lords who started a gun fight in which two people were killed. Kwasi was distrustful of police and would often get belligerent when dealing with them, with the exception of Fancy, with whom he had a cold but respectful relationship. Kwasi provoked Sipowicz into using the word "nigger" during a homicide investigation, causing conflict between Fancy and Sipowicz. Fancy removed Sipowicz from the case but refused Kwasi's demand that he be fired. Fancy accused Kwasi of protecting the drug dealers who disrupted the basketball game, which convinced Kwasi to provide an eyewitness statement that helped catch one of the shooters. When Kwasi was murdered, Sipowicz solved the case and apologized to Kwasi's ex-wife and daughter for his past language. Played by Tom Wright.
- Jimmy Liery — A thug with IRA connections whom Russell had known during a previous undercover assignment; she was asked to resume the undercover identity and reconnect with Liery in Season 4. Jimmy knew Diane as "Mouse" and his bad acts included anti-Semitic violence, and slipping Diane a roofie and then refusing to tell her what happened while she was unconscious. Bobby got angry enough to barge in on the operation and beat up and arrest Jimmy; later Bobby and Andy spread false information that led to Jimmy being murdered by his partner in arms-smuggling. Played by Christopher Meloni.
- Malcolm Cullinan — A wealthy man who appeared in Season 6, Cullinan hired PAA Dolores Mayo as a prostitute, watched as she died of a heroin overdose (which he videotaped), and then buried her body in New Jersey. PAA John Irvin punched Cullinan in the face when he saw the tape after Cullinan gave it to detectives to prove he had not murdered Mayo. It later emerged that Cullinan deliberately gave prostitutes high-grade drugs so he could watch them die of overdoses, and that he also tried to hire sleazy ex-cop Mike Roberts to kill Irvin in revenge for Irvin's punch. When Roberts did not follow through, and Cullinan feared Roberts would turn him in, Cullinan arranged for Roberts' death. After his actions indirectly led to the death of Sylvia Costas, Cullinan broke down and finally confessed. Played by Todd Waring.
- Don Kirkendall — Jill's ex-husband and father of her two boys, Don returned to Jill's life in Season 7. She claimed to believe that he was legitimately working, but quickly learned he was part of a major drug-trafficking ring. However, Jill's inability to turn him in or let him get arrested nearly ended her career before Don was apparently killed by the drug cartel. It later emerged that he and Denby had faked the death and begun their own dealing; Jill's career was destroyed because she hid this information because Don had kidnapped one of her sons for leverage. Diane and Danny arrested Don for the kidnapping, and his fictional story of how he was an innocent victim of Jill's narcotics trafficking and her "henchmen" at the 15th who forced poor Don to take the fall initially was convincing to a very credulous IAB team. Unfortunately for Don, he didn't think through that his plan to destroy Jill and the 15th's cops would also result in a lot of his former Colombian dealer associates going to jail as well, and the cost of his stupidity was that some of their imprisoned associates repeatedly stabbed Don in the Rikers' shower room and left him to bleed to death. Played by Erich Anderson.
- Craig Woodruff — An ex-con suspected of murdering his ex-wife. The only witness in the case was his son Michael, whom Baldwin Jones had taken under his wing. Michael was reluctant to inform on his father, but Craig later assaulted Michael's aunt, who was also Michael's foster mother. A lecture from Andy convinced Michael to tell what he knew about Craig, leading to Craig's arrest. After Craig was acquitted, Baldwin confronted him at a local bar, and the altercation soon became physical. Craig later reappeared and attempted to reenter Michael's life, greatly upsetting a suspicious Baldwin. Craig was murdered, and Baldwin was a suspect, but the married woman with whom Craig had had an affair and her husband each confessed. The case remained unresolved because the police could not prove which one had committed the crime. Played by Cyrus Farmer.
