= Connie McDowell =

Fictional character in television series NYPD Blue

- NYPD Blue character
- First appearance: “Oh, Golly Goth” (8x09)
- Last appearance: "Colonel Knowledge" (11x14)
- Portrayed by: Charlotte Ross

In-universe information
- Gender: Female
- Occupation: NYPD Detective
- Spouse: Andy Sipowicz (husband)
- Children: Theo Sipowicz (stepson); Michelle Sipowicz (adopted daughter); Matthew Sipowicz (son)

Connie McDowell is a fictional character in the television series NYPD Blue. She was played by Charlotte Ross from Season 8 to 11. Ross had previously guest starred on the show as another character in two episodes of Season 5.

== Biography ==
McDowell was born in 1968 and was from upstate New York, where her father had been the chief of police for the city of Saratoga Springs. She began her detective career as a "floater" working temporary assignments in whichever precinct was shorthanded until receiving permanent assignment to the 15th Precinct.

Soon after her arrival, Lieutenant Arthur Fancy was promoted to captain, and McDowell did not hit it off with his intended replacement, Susan Dalto. Upon asking if it was too late for her transfer out of the 15th Precinct, Fancy counseled her to stay, so that she did not develop a reputation as someone who could not get along with her superiors. Fancy ultimately solved the problem by engineering Dalto's transfer out; her replacement was Lieutenant Tony Rodriguez, with whom McDowell got along well. McDowell partnered first with Diane Russell, and later with Rita Ortiz.

McDowell dealt with some dysfunction in her family; she had a baby when she was 16, and her parents insisted she give the girl up for adoption. In late 2001 she contacted her daughter, by then a 16-year-old known as Jennifer Beck, by arranging a fake arrest for smoking marijuana; the attempted reunion was unsuccessful. McDowell was told by her doctors that she could not become pregnant again; still desiring to be a parent, she began to help Andy Sipowicz by babysitting his son Theo, which gradually led to a romantic relationship between her and Andy. McDowell also had a sister, Michelle, who was in an abusive relationship; after several unsuccessful efforts by McDowell and her co-workers to stop the abuse, Michelle's husband Frank killed her. McDowell ended up as the adoptive parent of her sister's child, after successfully fighting Frank's parents for custody.

After McDowell became the adoptive mother of her niece, her relationship with Andy continued to blossom; soon afterwards, McDowell became pregnant, despite her previous medical prognosis. Despite their age difference, they decided to marry, and she gave birth to a son, Matthew. After giving birth, McDowell left work to stay at home and raise the three children in the blended family she and Sipowicz had created. (In reality, McDowell's pregnancy and departure from the show coincided with Ross's real life pregnancy.) She is referred to several times during the rest of the series, usually as Sipowicz is talking to her on the phone while he is at work. When it was confirmed that Season 12 would be the series' last, the show's producers and Dennis Franz both reached out to Charlotte Ross to make a few return appearances as Connie. She politely declined.

== Sources ==
=== Internet ===
- Sepinwal, Alan. "Biographies: Connie McDowell, Charlotte Ross". NYPD Blue Online. Alan Sepinwal. Archived from the original on August 28, 2001.
- Sepinwal, Alan. "Frequently Asked Questions (FAQ) about NYPD Blue: Question 2, the Characters; Lt. Tony Rodriguez". NYPD Blue Online. Alan Sepinwal. Archived from the original on July 28, 2005.
- "Season 8, Episode 13: Flight of Fancy". Episode Data: NYPD Blue. Episodedata.com.
- "NYPD Blue Season 5 Episode Guide: Episodes 16, 18". TV Guide. CBS Interactive Inc. Archived from the original on September 16, 2015.
- "NYPD Blue: Regulars, Episode List and Details". NYPD Blue: (A Titles & Air Dates Guide). Epguides.com.

=== Newspapers ===
- Huff, Richard (April 7, 2004). "Actress is 'NYPD' Thru". New York Daily News. New York, NY. Archived from the original on December 20, 2016.
- Rohan, Virginia (April 8, 2001). "NYPD Blue's Ross Is Doing Her Time With The Crime". Sun-Sentinel. Ft. Lauderdale, FL. Archived from the original on December 20, 2016.
