= Safari So Good =

Safari So Good may refer to:

- Safari So Good (film), a 1947 Popeye the Sailor animated short
- "Safari, So Good" (NYPD Blue), a 2002 TV episode
- "Safari So Good" (Raw Toonage), a 1992 TV episode
  - Also aired as a 1993 episode of Marsupilami
- Safari, So Good!, a DVD release of The Cat in the Hat Knows a Lot About That! episodes
- "Safari So Good", a cartoon short from the 1965–1966 TV series The New 3 Stooges
- Safari So Good, an arcade at Disney's Animal Kingdom Lodge at Walt Disney World Resort, Orlando, Florida, U.S.

== See also ==
- "Safari So Goodi!", a 2002 episode of What's New, Scooby-Doo?
