= Total Security (TV series) =

American drama television series

- Genre: Drama
- Created by: Steven Bochco; David Milch; Charles H. Eglee; Theresa Rebeck
- Starring: James Remar; Jim Belushi; Debrah Farentino; Tracey Needham; Bill Brochtrup; Flex Alexander; Tony Plana; Kristin Bauer
- Composer: Mike Post
- Country of origin: United States
- Original language: English
- No. of seasons: 1
- No. of episodes: 13 (7 unaired)

Production
- Executive producers: Steven Bochco; Charles H. Eglee; Michael Fresco
- Producers: Joe Ann Fogle; Dayna Flanagan
- Cinematography: Anthony R. Palmieri
- Running time: 42 minutes
- Production companies: 20th Century Fox Television; Steven Bochco Productions

Original release
- Network: ABC
- Release: September 27 – November 8, 1997

Total Security is an American drama television series created by Steven Bochco, David Milch, Charles H. Eglee and Theresa Rebeck. The series stars James Remar, Jim Belushi, Debrah Farentino, Tracey Needham, Bill Brochtrup, Flex Alexander, Tony Plana and Kristin Bauer. The series aired on ABC from September 27 to November 8, 1997.

== Cast ==
- James Remar as Frank Cisco
- Jim Belushi as Steve Wegman
- Debrah Farentino as Jody Kiplinger
- Tracey Needham as Ellie Jones
- Bill Brochtrup as George LaSalle
- Flex Alexander as Neville Watson
- Tony Plana as Luis Escobar
- Kristin Bauer as Geneva Renault
- Jason Biggs as Robbie Rosenfeld
- Michael MacRae as Michael Miller
- George Wyner as Norman Rosenfeld

== Production ==
In February 1997, it was announced ABC had ordered a pilot from Steven Bochco called Total Security which would follow a team of private security specialists. The following month, it was announced Jim Belushi and James Remar would be starring as the leads for the series. Belushi opted for Private Security after his dissatisfaction with the creative direction of a sitcom project for ABC from Chuck Lorre titled It's Good To Be King, which would have featured him as a Chicago bar owner.

== Episodes ==
No.	Title	Directed by	Written by	Original release date	Prod. code	U.S. viewers (millions)
1	"Pilot"	Joe Ann Fogle	Story by : Steven Bochco & David Milch & Charles H. Eglee & Theresa Rebeck; Teleplay by : Theresa Rebeck	September 27, 1997	9101	7.65
2	"One Wedding and a Funeral"	Michael Fresco	Story by : Steven Bochco & Charles H. Eglee; Teleplay by : Nicholas Wootton	October 4, 1997	9102	6.40
3	"Dental Men Prefer Blondes"	Joe Ann Fogle	Story by : Steven Bochco & Charles H. Eglee; Teleplay by : Robert Palm	October 11, 1997	9103	TBA
4	"Looking for Mr. Goombah"	Duane Clark	Story by : Steven Bochco & Charles H. Eglee; Teleplay by : Geoffrey Neigher & Doug Palau	October 18, 1997	9104	TBA
5	"Citizen Canine"	Patrick R. Norris	Story by : Steven Bochco & Charles H. Eglee; Teleplay by : Nicholas Wootton	October 25, 1997	9105	TBA
6	"Who's Poppa?"	Duane Clark	Story by : Steven Bochco & Dayna Flanagan; Teleplay by : Geoffrey Neigher & Charles H. Eglee	November 8, 1997	9106	TBA
7	"Look Who's Stalking"	Joe Ann Fogle	Robert Palm	UNAIRED	9108	TBA
8	"Das Bootie"	Whitney Ransick	Story by : Dayna Flanagan & Charles H. Eglee; Teleplay by : Robert Palm	UNAIRED	9107	TBA
9	"Evasion of the Body Snatchers"	Donna Deitch	Story by : Steven Bochco & Charles H. Eglee & Doug Palau; Teleplay by : Doug Palau	UNAIRED	9109	TBA
10	"Wet Side Story"	Michael Fresco	Ted Mann	UNAIRED	9110	TBA
11	"The Never Bending Story"	Rick Wallace	Story by : Charles H. Eglee; Teleplay by : Robert Palm & Geoffrey Neigher & Doug Palau	UNAIRED	9111	TBA
12	"Do the Right Schwing"	Joe Ann Fogle	Story by : Charles H. Eglee & Dayna Flanagan; Teleplay by : Robert Palm	UNAIRED	9112	TBA
13	"A Man for Half a Season"	TBD	Story by : Steven Bochco & Charles H. Eglee & Dayna Flanagan; Teleplay by : Charles H. Eglee & Geoffrey Neigher & Robert Palm	UNAIRED	9113	TBA
