= Arthur Fancy =

Fictional character in television series NYPD Blue

- NYPD Blue character
- James McDaniel as Lt. Arthur Fancy
- First appearance: "Pilot"
- Last appearance: "Flight of Fancy"
- Portrayed by: James McDaniel

In-universe information
- Title: Lieutenant
- Occupation: NYPD Detective
- Family: Reggie (brother)
- Spouse: Lillian
- Children: 4
- Nationality: American

Capt. Arthur Fancy is a character in the television series NYPD Blue. He is played by James McDaniel from seasons one through eight. McDaniel appears in all 167 episodes, from the show's 1993 pilot to the 2001 episode in which his departure is depicted.

== Background ==
In an episode in late summer 1995, Fancy stated that he is 42 years old and that he was 41 when his wife gave birth in January 1995. This places his birthday sometime between January and August 1953. He also alluded in Season 2 to recently passing his 20-year service mark on the police force. Fancy previously worked as a detective prior to entering the management track and was promoted to lieutenant in charge of the 15th detective squad about a year prior to the start of the show's timeline.

Fancy was one of the newly recruited African American commanders on a force previously controlled by Irish American police officers. According to officer Jack Hanlon during a conversation with John Kelly, "the force up until the 1960s was comprised of a majority Irish Americans with some Italian American and Jewish officers, but only a few African Americans."

Fancy commands the respect of black community activists and the (entirely white) upper leadership of the fictional version of New York City Police Department. He expresses a pragmatic attitude towards older cops' outdated beliefs. In different episodes, Fancy manages to thwart the attempts of his superior, Captain Haverhill, who opposes appointing black commanders, to frame him for misconduct and threatens a civil lawsuit over racial discrimination. Fancy also reprimands the officer Szymanski for a racially motivated traffic stop. In “Weaver of Hate”, he also demands that a crime victim's father, who always uses racial slurs, be removed from the squad room.

== Family ==
Fancy's wife, Lillian, is played by Tamara Tunie. The characters married in mid-1982. When the show began, they had two daughters. A son, Arthur Jr., was born during the run of the show. The family also participates in the foster care program. Lillian is diabetic, which causes Fancy to be overprotective during her last pregnancy, which he later apologizes for.

He has a younger brother, an officer named Reggie (played by Michael Jai White), who is distrustful of whites. In an attempt to get Reggie fired, McNamara helps a black gypsy cab driver falsely accuse Reggie of taking kickbacks, which led Reggie to be suspended. McNamara claims he is merely following departmental procedures. Fancy informed his detectives. They conducted an investigation that revealed McNamara's misdeeds.

It is revealed in Season 6 that Fancy's father was an alcoholic who stole his mother's money and died as a poor man in the streets. His family takes in a foster child named Maceo in season 1, and Fancy is devastated when Maceo's mom, a reformed drug abuser, later returns to reclaim custody. In season 4, when Maceo is arrested for running drugs for his off-the-wagon mom, Fancy has to convince him to cooperate with the NYPD in a sting against her associates. His mother blames him and says prison might do him some good.

== Relationship ==
=== 15th Precinct commanders ===
When a borough commander named Haverhill (played by James Handy) planned to fabricate reasons to remove Fancy from command, Andy Sipowicz used information about an unsolved organized crime murder to blackmail Haverhill into leaving Fancy alone. Haverill later started a witch hunt directed at Detective John Kelly, one of Fancy's best detectives. After stoking an investigation based on flimsy allegations, Haverhill provoked Kelly into committing an act of insubordination. Haverhill assigns him to menial work as a dispatcher. Kelly resigns from the force.

Haverhill later tried to use one of Fancy's informants to make it appear Fancy was corrupt. Fancy uncovered the plan and got the informant to record Haverhill calling Fancy a "nigger". Haverhill angrily retired.

=== Detective Sipowicz ===
Fancy was one of the characters who most influenced Andy Sipowicz, changing his once-openly racist views. Most of Sipowicz's hostility toward Fancy originated from Sipowicz's troubled past with African Americans from his childhood and early days on the force infiltrating the Black Panther Party. Fancy, at the same time, had dealt with white police officers since his days at the police academy. Fancy and Sipowicz clashed over a racially charged police shooting and Sipowicz's exchange of racist words with a black community activist, but eventually they grew to respect each other.

== Bayside, Queens, incident ==
In Season 4, Fancy and his wife were stopped at a traffic light and treated in a rough and possibly racist manner by two police officers in Bayside, Queens.

The following day, Fancy called the officers in, claiming that they had pulled them over as if they were suspects in an armed robbery. After questioning the officers, Fancy concluded that he and his wife were pulled over at gunpoint strictly on the basis of their race. The senior officer, Szymanski, denied pulling them over on the basis of their race. Fancy went to Captain Bass, requesting that the Chief of Patrol transfer Officer Szymanski out of the predominantly Caucasian precinct of Bayside, Queens. Junior Officer McCaslin had only been on the force for 10 months. He was seated in the passenger's seat of the squad car, and Fancy believed he was merely backing Szymanski, his superior.

Captain Bass then came to Fancy, telling him that putting Szymanski in Bedford-Stuyvesant was a bad idea. Fancy got Szymanski transferred under his command to the 15th precinct, where he was assigned a Black partner. Szymanski later faced false accusations of robbing a black drug dealer and assassinating a Black undercover officer while at the 15th.

== Promotion to captain ==
After nine years as the commander of the 15th Precinct's detective squad, Fancy was promoted to captain. When the 15th Squad discovered that Captain Bass's wife was injuring herself as a means of getting attention, Bass expressed gratitude that they kept the matter from becoming a criminal case or a news story. He retired to care for her and recommended Fancy as his replacement. When Lieutenant Susan Dalto was transferred in as Fancy's replacement, but made the squad dysfunctional, Fancy called on Bass for one more favor. Bass had Dalto transferred out and Fancy was permanently replaced by Lieutenant Tony Rodriguez.
