= John Clark Jr. =

Fictional character in television series NYPD Blue

- NYPD Blue character
- First appearance: “Lies Like a Rug” (9x01)
- Last appearance: “Moving Day” (12x20)
- Portrayed by: Mark-Paul Gosselaar

In-universe information
- Family: John Clark, Sr. (father)
- Significant other: Dr. Jennifer Devlin

John Clark Jr. is a fictional character in the television series NYPD Blue. He was played by Mark-Paul Gosselaar for four years, from season 9 until the end of the series.

== Biography ==
Clark Jr. was partnered with Detective Andy Sipowicz after Sipowicz's previous partner, Danny Sorenson, was murdered in an undercover sting that went wrong. Clark earned his detective badge and choice of precinct after courageous action in an undercover operation. Sipowicz became a mentor, and much of the veteran detective's skill rubbed off on Clark Jr.

His father, John Clark Sr., was a by-the-book, average detective who disapproved of his son's choice of precinct. He referred to the 15th Precinct as a "hellhole" and held a strong dislike for Sipowicz, whom he knew from previous experiences. The conflict between father and son came to a head when Clark Sr. threw his son out of the house because of his decision to work with Sipowicz. When Clark Jr.'s name up in connection with a murdered prostitute, he realized that it was his father, not him, then covered for his father until Sipowicz convinced Clark Sr. to clear Clark Jr.'s name. Clark Sr. disrupted his son's career when he showed up drunk at the 15th Precinct, having been forced into retirement then turned into an IAB informant as a result of his involvement with the prostitute. Clark Sr. subsequently committed suicide. Clark Jr. had been dating Rita Ortiz, but the relationship ended when he pushed her away while grieving his father's death.

Clark Jr.'s bipolar ex-girlfriend, Dr. Jennifer Devlin (Chandra West), later died of a prescription drug overdose. As a result of the tragedies, Clark Jr. experienced a brief, ugly period where he was often drunk and had a number of indiscriminate sexual encounters, causing at least one of the squad's cases to be ruined in court. With Sipowicz's help, Clark Jr. righted himself, and soon began dating Assistant District Attorney Laurie Munson.

Despite these personal troubles and some mistakes early in his career, Clark Jr. developed an excellent interview manner and attitude, which Sipowicz noted after observing an interrogation conducted solely by Clark. Clark eventually became the 15th Squad's lead detective, partnering with Baldwin Jones after Sipowicz was promoted to squad commander at the series' conclusion.
