= Diane Russell (NYPD Blue) =

Fictional character in television series NYPD Blue

- NYPD Blue character
- First appearance: "The Boxer Rebellion" (2x19)
- Last appearance: “Lost Time” (8x20)

In-universe information
- Spouse: Bobby Simone

Diane Russell is a fictional character in the television series NYPD Blue. She was played by Kim Delaney in Season 2 as a recurring character, from Seasons 3 to 8 as a primary character, and a recurring character again in Seasons 10 and 11.

== Biography ==
While working a case with Bobby Simone, Russell and he became attracted to each other and began a personal relationship, which became complicated when she transferred to the 15th squad and they became co-workers.

Russell was a skilled detective, but came from a dysfunctional family; this background, in addition to her years of working undercover, caused her to develop a drinking problem and other emotional issues. Bobby broke up with her in large part because of her alcoholism; they resumed their personal relationship after she sought treatment and stopped drinking.

Over the course of the show, Russell's family issues were a major story line, which largely culminated when her mother shot and killed her father, who had been emotionally and physically abusive to Russell's mother and brother, and had sexually abused Russell when she was a child.

As their relationship solidified, Russell and Simone conceived a child, but Russell miscarried. A few months later, Russell and Simone got married, but Simone developed a heart ailment and died from transplant complications soon afterwards.

After Russell returned to work, she engaged in a flirtation and brief romance with Simone's replacement, Danny Sorenson. The relationship failed, and Russell took a leave of absence to work out her personal issues. When she returned to service, she was a member of the department's Special Victims (sex crimes) unit.

Russell received the Medal of Honor for her actions during a standoff when a DEA agent was being held at gunpoint in the eighth-season episode "Russellmania".

== Awards and decorations ==
The following are the medals and service awards worn by Detective Russell. She received the Medal of Honor for her actions during a standoff when another officer was being held at gunpoint in the eighth-season episode "Russellmania".

American Flag Breast Bar
World Trade Center Breast Bar
Medal of Honor

== Sources ==
=== Internet ===
- Sepinwall, Alan. "Biographies: Diane Russell, Kim Delaney". NYPD Blue Online. Archived from the original on January 14, 2006.

=== Newspapers ===
- Avins, Mimi (May 7, 2001). "Hailing an Unsung Heroine: After six seasons, Kim Delaney leaves 'NYPD Blue' as the tough, dedicated Diane Russell, a flawed character who bucked the stereotypes". Los Angeles Times. Los Angeles, CA.
- Friedman, Josh (May 13, 2003). "Delaney Remains True 'Blue'". Los Angeles Times. Los Angeles, CA.
