= John F. O'Donohue =

American actor (1946–2026)

- Born: January 14, 1946; New York City, New York, U.S.
- Died: January 6, 2026 (aged 79); Vero Beach, Florida, U.S.
- Other names: John F. Donohue, John F. O'Donahue, John O'Donahue, John O'Donohue
- Occupation: Actor
- Years active: 1991–2016

John F. O'Donohue (January 14, 1946 – January 6, 2026) was an American actor. A former police officer, he played Sgt. Eddie Gibson in the television series NYPD Blue.

== Career ==
A 20 year veteran of the New York Police Department, his first acting role was that of an armed guard in Knots Landing in 1991. The next year, he was hired as a main supporting character in every episode of the short lived, critically acclaimed Ben Stiller Show until its cancellation. He has since appeared in such programs as Diagnosis: Murder, Seinfeld, Everybody Loves Raymond, Brooklyn South and The West Wing. After appearing on NYPD Blue intermittently, O'Donohue joined the show on a regular basis for the second half of the eleventh season as the squad commander, Sergeant Eddie Gibson.

== Death ==
O'Donohue died in Vero Beach, Florida, on January 6, 2026, at the age of 79. John succumbed to illnesses contracted while in the service of his country.

== Selected Filmography ==
- Knots Landing (1 episode, 1991) – Armed Guard
- Matlock (1 episode, 1991) – Detective Vorhess
- L.A. Law (1 episode, 1992) – Jury Foreman
- Doogie Howser, M.D. (1 episode, 1992) – Harry
- Snapdragon (1993) – Fat Man
- Reality Bites (1994) – Food Mart Clerk (uncredited)
- Seinfeld (1 episode, 1995) – Gus
- ER (1 episode, 1995) – Mr. Goodwin
- Step by Step (1 episode, 1995) – Lester
- The Single Guy (1 episode, 1995) – Fireman
- Mad About You (1 episode, 1995) – Ernest
- Chicago Hope (3 episodes, 1995–1998) – Detective Gene Pirro / Detective Ryan
- NewsRadio (1 episode, 1996) – Stan
- The Cable Guy (1996) – Prison Guard
- Guy (1996) – Detective
- Cybill (1 episode, 1996) – Stagehand
- Diagnosis: Murder (2 episodes, 1996) – Jail Guard
- Living Single (1 episode, 1996) – Kenneth Reed
- Early Edition (1 episode, 1996) – Jordan Butler
- Steel (1997) – Federal Reserve Guard
- As Good as It Gets (1997) – Detective Ray
- Everybody Loves Raymond (1 episode, 1998) – Harry
- Living Out Loud (1998) – Sid
- Simon Says (1998) – Bobby Morgan
- The King of Queens (1 episode, 1999) – Jack O'Boyle
- Just Shoot Me! (1 episode, 1999) – Sgt. Fanning
- Suddenly Susan (1 episode, 1999) – Dirk
- NYPD Blue (28 episodes, 1994–2004) – Det. Eddie Gibson / Court Clerk
- Lucky Numbers (2000) – Bobby
- Providence (1 episode, 2000) – Henry Pillup
- The Family Man (2000) – Tony the Doorman
- The West Wing (1 episode, 2001) – Mr. Koveleskie
- CSI: Crime Scene Investigation (1 episode, 2001) – Carl Mercer
- CSI: Miami (1 episode, 2003) – Fire Marshal Ronnie Jameson
- Law & Order (1 episode, 2003) – David Carlson
- Crooked Lines (2003) – Detective Anderson
- The Groomsmen (2006) – Pops
- Lonely Street (2008) – Hank The Tank
- Law & Order: Special Victims Unit (1 episode, 2009) – Stevedore
- Meet Pete (1 episode, 2013) – Larry
- Cop Show (9 episodes, 2015–2016) – Tommy
