= Bill Brochtrup =

American actor (born 1963)

- Born: March 7, 1963 (age 63); Inglewood, California
- Education: New York University (BA)
- Occupation: Actor
- Years active: 1984–present

William Brochtrup Jr. (born March 7, 1963) is an American actor. He is known for playing John Irvin, a police administrative assistant, on the ABC television drama NYPD Blue.

== Early life and education ==
Born William Brochtrup Jr. in Inglewood, California, Brochtrup was raised in Tacoma, Washington and graduated from New York University's Tisch School of the Arts in 1985.

== Career ==
After graduating from college, Brochtrup moved to Los Angeles to pursue an acting career. He was billed as "William Brochtrup" in some of his earliest roles in the 1980s.

Theatre credits for Brochtrup include David Marshall Grant's Snakebit (off-Broadway at the Century Center and in Los Angeles at the Coast Playhouse), South Coast Repertory (Noises Off, Taking Steps, The Real Thing), the Antaeus Theatre Company (Peace In Our Time, The Malcontent, Cousin Bette, Tonight at 8.30, Sinan Unel's Pera Palas), Black Dahlia Theatre (Jonathan Tolins' Secrets of the Trade, Richard Kramer's Theater District, both directed by Matt Shakman), The Odyssey Theatre Ensemble (Bach at Leipzig, Small Tragedy), L.A. Theatre Works (The Great Tennessee Monkey Trial, The Caine Mutiny Court-Martial), and Pasadena Playhouse (If Memory Serves).

He appeared in the feature films Life as We Know It, He's Just Not That Into You, Duck, Ravenous, Man of the Year, and Space Marines.

Brochtrup has been a series regular on three Steven Bochco shows: CBS sitcom Public Morals, ABC drama Total Security, and seven seasons on the ABC drama NYPD Blue. He has appeared on television shows as varied as Dexter, Without a Trace, the animated children's series The Wild Thornberrys (as the voice of a dolphin), Major Crimes (as Dr. Joe Bowman), and Bravo's Celebrity Poker Showdown. Brochtrup is a frequent guest host of the PBS newsmagazine In The Life.

He has written for Out magazine. The best-selling book of essays I Love You, Mom! includes his original stories at Un-Cabaret and numerous spoken word events. He has hosted AIDS Walks across the country, supports animal rescue organizations like the Society for the Prevention of Cruelty to Animals, and has travelled the Persian Gulf, Atlantic, Mediterranean, Germany, Japan, Bosnia and Kosovo meeting servicemen and women during Handshake Tours for the United Service Organizations (USO) and Armed Forces Entertainment.

From 2012 to September 2024, he served as Artistic Director of the Antaeus Theatre Company in Glendale, CA.

== Personal life ==
Brochtrup came out to People magazine as gay in 1997. He said, "[C]asting directors have known [that] for years," and assured that being gay would have no "adverse effect" on his career, even with potential typecasting. In 2012, Brochtrup said that he has not regretted coming out back then.

== Filmography ==
=== Films ===
Film
Year	Title	Role	Notes
1993	Something Else	Eugene	
1995	Man of the Year	Pledge Cartwright	
1996	Not Again!	Glen	
1996	Space Marines	Hacker	
1999	Ravenous	Lindus	
2002	Role of a Lifetime	Bruce's Receptionist	
2005	Duck	Leopold	
2009	He's Just Not That Into You	Larry	
2010	Life as We Know It	Gary	
2012	No Boundaries	Dr. Harvey	(Short film)
2018	Finding Home	Dr. Cohen	(Short)
2019	Hypnotized	Kyle	(completed in 2019, not released)

=== TV ===
Television
Year	Title	Role	Notes
1989-1996	Murder, She Wrote	Leo Gunderson (1989, credited as William Brochtrup) / Gene Gains (1996)	(TV Series), 2 episodes: "Class Act" and "Murder Among Friends"
1993	Birds of a Feather	Tour Guide (credited as William Brochtrup)	(TV Series), 1 episode: "It Happened in Hollywood"
1994	Diagnosis Murder	Paramedic	(TV Series), 1 episode: "Georgia on My Mind"
1995	Terror in the Shadows	Maitre D'	(TV Movie)
1995	The Monroes	Duane	(TV Series), 1 episode: "Father Knows Best"
1995	Betrayed: A Story of Three Women	Patrick McGraw	(TV Movie)
1995-2005	NYPD Blue	John Irvin	(TV Series), 156 episodes
1996	Public Morals	John Irvin	(TV Series), 13 episodes
1996	Picket Fences	Gordy Hartman	(TV Series), 1 episode: "Bye-Bye, Bey-Bey"
1997	Total Security	George LaSalle	(TV Series), 12 episodes
1997	Dharma & Greg	Steve	(TV Series), 1 episode: "Indian Summer"
1997	Two Small Voices	David Ivey	(TV Movie)
2001	The Wild Thornberrys	Colin (voice of dolphin)	(TV Series), 1 episode: "Hello, Dolphin!"
2005	Without a Trace	Edgar	(TV Series), 1 episode: "Second Sight"
2010	Dexter	Funeral Director	(TV Series), 1 episode: "My Bad"
2012	Kendra	Arnold	(TV Series), 3 episodes: "Three Way", "Driver's License" and "Old Fashioned"
2013-2014	Shameless	Hal	(TV Series), 4 episodes
2013-2017	Major Crimes	Dr. Joe Bowman	(TV Series), 13 episodes
2019	After Forever	Frank	(TV Series), 2 episodes: "Honeymoon" and "One Step Forward"
