= NYPD Blue season 3 =

Season of television series

NYPD Blue
- Season 3
- Season 3 U.S. DVD cover
- No. of episodes: 22

Release
- Original network: ABC
- Original release: October 24, 1995 – May 21, 1996

Season chronology
- ← Previous; Season 2 Next → Season 4

The third season of NYPD Blue premiered on ABC on October 24, 1995, and concluded on May 21, 1996.

| Actor | Character | Main cast | Recurring cast |
|---|---|---|---|
| Jimmy Smits | Bobby Simone | entire season | —N/a |
| Dennis Franz | Andy Sipowicz | entire season | —N/a |
| James McDaniel | Arthur Fancy | entire season | —N/a |
| Nicholas Turturro | James Martinez | entire season | —N/a |
| Sharon Lawrence | Sylvia Costas | entire season | —N/a |
| Gordon Clapp | Greg Medavoy | entire season | —N/a |
| Gail O'Grady | Donna Abandando | episodes 1–20 | —N/a |
| Justine Miceli | Adrienne Lesniak | entire season | —N/a |
| Kim Delaney | Diane Russell | entire season | —N/a |
| Bill Brochtrup | John Irvin | —N/a | episodes 1, 5, 8, 16, 22 |

== Episodes ==
| No. overall | No. in season | Title | Directed by | Written by | Original release date | Prod. code | U.S. viewers (millions) |
|---|---|---|---|---|---|---|---|
| 45 | 1 | "E.R." | Mark Tinker | Story by : David Milch & David Mills; Teleplay by : David Mills | October 24, 1995 | 0G01/5301 | 24.7 |
Medavoy and Martinez come upon a bar robbery in progress, where one of the robbers shows a badge and claims he's a cop. They let their guard down just long enough for the other robber to fire at them. In the ensuing chase Martinez is shot and may lose the use of his left leg. Turns out the badge-holder is a corrections officer gone bad who almost succeeds in leveraging bogus info about drug trafficking to get off scot-free, until Bobby and Andy ruin his plans. Diane has been going to AA with Andy; Sylvia tells a somewhat oblivious Andy she is ”late.”
| 46 | 2 | "Torah! Torah! Torah!" | Donna Deitch | Story by : Theresa Rebeck & Bill Clark; Teleplay by : Theresa Rebeck | October 31, 1995 | 0G02/5302 | 21.9 |
A young developmentally challenged man is suspected of killing his sister while their parents are away, but the case leads the detectives to a truly sick individual. An historically valuable Torah is stolen from a Hasidic synagogue. Detective Morrissey (Episode 4-2) has run out options in his pursuit of a man accused of killing his wife. Lesniak's visits to Martinez in the hospital have everyone thinking they are an item. Sylvia swears Andy to absolute secrecy on her pregnancy, but he just can't help telling some of the squad "in strictest confidence". Notes: Sam Rockwell guest stars as Billy.; Rebeck and Clark won an Edgar award in the category of "Best Mystery Teleplay from a Series" for this episode.
| 47 | 3 | "One Big Happy Family" | Michael M. Robin | Gardner Stern | November 7, 1995 | 0G03/5303 | 21.2 |
Medavoy and Lesniak catch the case of a man who has been repeatedly attacked but claims he hasn't an enemy in the world. Simone recognizes a man as the suspect in a series of rapes but can't hold him. Diane intervenes when her drunken father creates a scene at a local bar. Adrienne is uncomfortable at the assumptions about her and James and tells Greg that she's a lesbian. Sylvia becomes a martyr to intense morning sickness.
| 48 | 4 | "Heavin’ Can Wait" | Elodie Keene | Story by : Leonard Gardner & Bill Clark; Teleplay by : Leonard Gardner | November 14, 1995 | 0G04/5304 | 21.0 |
Andy's day gets off to an aggressively bad start. He's unable to help Sylvia with her terrible morning sickness, and Diane reveals she called Bobby instead of Andy when she fell off the wagon the night before. It only gets worse when he and Simone catch a particularly gruesome case where two small children were shot execution style. In his anger he manages to alienate everyone he interviews, as well as his partner. They almost come to blows when picking up two suspects, but Sipowicz keeps himself under control long enough to get valuable information out of one of them. Martinez casually lets slip that Lesniak is gay. Notes: Jasmine Guy guest stars as LaVonna Runnels and Raymond Cruz as Raoul Calderon
| 49 | 5 | "Dirty Laundry" | Mark Tinker | David Milch & Nicholas Wootton | November 21, 1995 | 0G05/5305 | 22.7 |
Simone and Sipowicz catch the case of a low rent pimp shot down in a laundromat, and find the witness is Holly Snyder (Episode 2.21), who is obviously "messed up" on drugs. When they get back to the squad, Fancy pulls Simone off the case to babysit a newly assigned detective, Ronnie Drucker, who has "a big IAB bug crawling up his shorts" so Russell works the laundromat murder with Sipowicz. Simone and Drucker catch a case of alleged child molestation that ends badly on the investigation and then (deservedly) much worse for Drucker. Andy weighs having Upstairs John cut his hair.
| 50 | 6 | "Curt Russell" | Jim Charleston | Story by : Bill Clark & Leonard Gardner; Teleplay by : Leonard Gardner | November 28, 1995 | 0G06/5306 | 21.9 |
A case involving an Indian woman found strangled in her car brings out the worst of Sipowicz's racism. Simone believes the husband is not involved, but is suspicious of the woman's actions as she didn't follow the family's usual routine that day. Russell and Lesniak are sent to identify a DOA. Medavoy and Martinez arrest a guy, high on LSD, for stealing credit card slip duplicates. Simone goes ballistic when he learns Russell is going undercover on a gun buy. While Donna is on a computer course, an apathetic PAA subs for her.
| 51 | 7 | "Aging Bull" | Davis Guggenheim | David Mills | December 12, 1995 | 0G07/5307 | 20.1 |
The entire squad is sent out to investigate when a high-powered publisher is snatched off the street. But the investigation is barely off the ground when the FBI swoops in and takes over, much to Sipowicz's disgust, as he is convinced that that just blew any chances of getting the victim back alive. Annoying Steve the Snitch (Episode 2.8) provides information to the squad that may save the publisher. Bobby is concerned about his old mentor, the ex-boxer and pigeon fancier Patsy, who appears to be sliding into senility. Donna returns from her word processing class and has an awkward reunion with Greg.
| 52 | 8 | "Cold Heaters" | Adam Nimoy | Story by : Bill Clark & Theresa Rebeck; Teleplay by : Theresa Rebeck | December 19, 1995 | 0G08/5308 | 20.6 |
Simone gets some information from his childhood friend Ray DiSalvo (Episode 2.12) that could break a cold case involving the killing of two retired cops. DiSalvo is desperate to spend no more time ”inside”. Lt. Fancy takes the lead in a case involving the shooting of two hispanics at a bodega by a black family man. Medavoy gets involved with theater egos as he works the case of one actor who claims another assaulted him with a stage sword. IAB Sergeant Martens shocks Bobby when he tells Bobby a hard truth about Ray, leading to an ugly confrontation between Bobby and his "good friend." Notes: Anthony Stewart Head guest stars as Raleigh Gibson.
| 53 | 9 | "Sorry, Wong Suspect" | Michael M. Robin | Story by : Bill Clark & Gardner Stern; Teleplay by : Gardner Stern | January 9, 1996 | 0G09/5309 | 21.5 |
Simone and Sipowicz, along with Det. Harold Ng (Episode 2.3), catch the case of a 19-year-old Chinese girl found stabbed in her bedroom. No weapon is found, and there are no signs of forced entry; her parents suspect her boyfriend. Martinez reluctantly works with Lesniak on the push-in robbery of a wheelchair-using woman. Greg moves into the crib upstairs after he and Marie have "WWIII"; Sipowicz says he may join him due to tensions caused by Sylvia's pregnancy. Marie and Donna have an acrimonious encounter that somehow leads to some sex for Greg. Notes: MacKenzie Phillips guest stars as Mary Donaldson
| 54 | 10 | "The Backboard Jungle" | Mark Tinker | Story by : William L. Morris; Teleplay by : David Mills | January 16, 1996 | 0G10/5310 | 20.8 |
Sipowicz's racism becomes a serious problem in the investigation of a multiple homicide at a basketball game in honor of a youth who died in police custody. The organizer makes an issue of Sipowicz's racial cracks, including use of the "n" word, and demands "that cracker's badge", while Fancy balances his disgust over Andy's behavior with his dislike of the organizer's actions and desire to just close the cases. Sipowicz also has a big issue with a reporter who stands firmly on his 1st Amendment rights. Even Simone is at odds with Sipowicz over his attitude, but it's Sylvia who ultimately gets Andy to face up to his issues. Notes: Hill Harper guest stars as Bo-Bo
| 55 | 11 | "Burnin' Love" | Perry Lang | Story by : Bill Clark & Leonard Gardner; Teleplay by : Leonard Gardner | January 30, 1996 | 0G11/5311 | 19.8 |
Sipowicz and Simone are assigned to a case of arson where a young woman was burnt to death in the basement of a vacant building. The victim matches the description of a missing woman. They interview the missing woman's father and a young man, a friend of hers. They realize the dead woman is the missing daughter, and that the friend is possibly involved. Medavoy gets an assignment guarding a guy who is the subject of a contract put out by a drug dealer, and has a great time when he joins in the perpetual poker game going on there. Notes: Poppy Montgomery guest stars as Lisa Arcotti
| 56 | 12 | "These Old Bones" | Donna Deitch | Theresa Rebeck | February 6, 1996 | 0G12/5312 | 20.1 |
Diane's father is killed in their apartment and her brother, Dougie, insists he did it. But there are discrepancies between the evidence and the stories being told by Dougie, Mrs. Russell, and a neighbor woman who is a witness. A woman comes to the squad insisting that her husband, Rickie, is threatening to kill her like he did "that boy eight years ago". Andy and Greg uncover a trail that reveals the missing kid was garbage and Rickie is even worse.
| 57 | 13 | "A Tushful of Dollars" | Elodie Keene | Story by : Bill Clark & Nicholas Wootton; Teleplay by : Nicholas Wootton | February 13, 1996 | 0G13/5313 | 19.1 |
Simone and Sipowicz investigate the killing of the upright older son of a known mob boss. At the scene the family is uncooperative, but a neighbor comes in later on and tells them the mother told her the useless younger brother did the murder. Russell and Medavoy cross swords with high-powered lawyer Barry Ulin in the case of a woman apparently shot by her husband. Diane is unhappy with her lawyer's approach to her mother's defense and even more so with ADA Cohen's approach; both of whom are worried that appearance of special treatment could be a problem.
| 58 | 14 | "The Nutty Confessor" | Mark Tinker | Story by : Bill Clark & Gardner Stern; Teleplay by : Gardner Stern | February 20, 1996 | 0G14/5314 | 20.2 |
Simone, Sipowicz, Martinez, and Lesniak are assigned the case of a young woman found "gutted like a fish". Various leads are followed before one of the victim's credit cards used in a casino in Atlantic City leads to a suspect. Russell and Medavoy work the shooting of a surgeon in a mugging outside his personal assistant's apartment building. Adrienne asks advice from Donna about her and James' "big night", about which everyone in the squad seems to know. Notes: Jenna Elfman guest stars as Patty Snow.
| 59 | 15 | "Head Case" | Randy Zisk | Story by : David Mills & Bill Clark; Teleplay by : David Mills | February 27, 1996 | 0G15/5315 | 18.8 |
When an NYU professor is found dead, decapitated in his apartment, the doorman tells Sipowicz and Simone that the professor had a predilection for hustler types of color. When they tell his mother of the murder, she is strangely detached and distant, and more concerned with getting their car back. Porn starlet Vanessa Del Rio shows up at the squad for assistance with harassing phone calls she's been getting, delighting James and his friend Manny and irritating Adrienne. Andy Jr. stops by to tell his father he needs to talk, but won't tell him why, making Andy Sr., with his tendency to think the worst, crazy for the rest of the day. Notes: Vanessa del Rio guest stars as herself
| 60 | 16 | "Girl Talk" | Perry Lang | Story by : Bill Clark & Theresa Rebeck; Teleplay by : Theresa Rebeck | March 19, 1996 | 0G16/5316 | 18.1 |
When a young girl is raped and thrown off the roof of the building she lives in, Det. Martina Escobar comes to work with the 15th, as she is already working on a similar case, where the girl survived. Sipowicz is less than thrilled about working with her as he believes she "stole" his promotion the year he got "screwed" out of his. Martinez and Russell catch the case of a woman who claims to be the victim of date rape; the accused rapist has a very different story, which Martinez believes and Russell doesn't, and the women at the 15th are generally not happy with their male colleagues' attitudes. Notes: Wanda de Jesus guest stars as Martina Escobar
| 61 | 17 | "Hollie and the Blowfish" | Davis Guggenheim | Story by : Bill Clark & David Simon; Teleplay by : David Simon | March 26, 1996 | 0G17/5317 | 18.0 |
Simone runs across a well-connected old informant, who gives Simone and Sipowicz some good information that clears several cold cases in exchange for a blind eye to criminal on criminal crime. A blowhard from Sipowicz's past shows up at the 15th in charge of a unit investigating a case involving warring drug dealers and the death of a 10-year-old girl caught in the crossfire. Fancy assigns Russell to assist the unit. Martinez and Medavoy investigate the murder of a young Santeria priest. Notes: Danny Trejo guest stars as Gabriel Mota, Giancarlo Esposito as Ferdinand Hollie, and Daniel Von Bargen as Sgt. Ray Kahlins.
| 62 | 18 | "We Was Robbed" | Mark Tinker | Story by : Bill Clark & Leonard Gardner; Teleplay by : Leonard Gardner | April 2, 1996 | 0G18/5318 | 19.7 |
A Mafia loan shark is found dead in the East River, and a nervous FBI agent thinks the killers came from a mob-connected social club. While installing a wiretap at the club, Andy and Bobby are interrupted by two low-level hoods—whom they then rob to keep their cover. Donna's hairdresser comes to her for help when her rotten cousin is trying to help her violent ex-boyfriend rob her current man's truck, and the successful op to stop the robbery leads to the worst tension yet between James and Adrienne. Andy tells Andy Jr. a story about how he nearly shot and killed an innocent person during his beat-cop days because he didn't know the keys of "people, places, the things they do, and the times they do them".
| 63 | 19 | "Auntie Maimed" | Michael Watkins | Story by : Bill Clark & Nicholas Wootton; Teleplay by : Nicholas Wootton | April 30, 1996 | 0G19/5319 | 17.7 |
Andy's on a knife's edge (which is where his emotional barometer usually settles anyway) as his son's birth looms; he talks too much about 911 calls, the fact that Sylvia's doctor is Jewish, etc. But he has time to teach Andy Jr. on the job, as he and Simone investigate a break-in and robbery where an elderly woman was killed. Martinez and Medavoy catch the case of a bouncer beaten to death at a strip club. Donna meets an Apple recruiter and considers a new career path. Adrienne knows James wants to break up with her, and when they finally sit down to talk he gently confirms that's the truth.: Future Dexter star Erik King appears as Billy, a junkie suspected of killing his aunt.
| 64 | 20 | "A Death In the Family" | Mark Tinker | Michael Daly | May 7, 1996 | 0G20/5320 | 20.9 |
Andy and Bobby go to the hospital to investigate a bar robbery where a man intervened to prevent the robbers from raping a waitress and got shot. To their horror, the man who was shot and killed was Andy Sipowicz Jr. Andy can barely contain his shock, and Bobby resolves to work the case around the clock until they catch Andy Jr.'s killers. Bobby works the case with Diane and struggles with an unthinkable request Andy made to him. Andy makes funeral arrangements and continues blaming himself; he leaves Sylvia alone at home with their newborn son and ends his long period of sobriety. Donna decides to take the job with Apple; Greg is clearly hurt but keeps his feelings to himself as the woman he loved walks out the 15th forever. Note: Last credited appearance of Gail O'Grady as Donna Abandando. The character returns for a brief, uncredited, appearance in Season 6, episode 18.
| 65 | 21 | "Closing Time" | David Rosenbloom | Story by : Bill Clark & David Mills; Teleplay by : David Mills | May 14, 1996 | 0G21/5321 | 19.8 |
Andy has continued on a drunken bender after his son's murder, to the point where an angry Sylvia throws him out of their apartment. His behavior on the job is just as abysmal. Fancy hears about it and orders him to take lost time, saying he doesn't want to end Andy's career but will if he comes back a wreck again. Simone and Martinez get a break when a prostitute comes in with a story that might be useful. Note: Dennis Franz submitted this episode and won the Primetime Emmy Award for Outstanding Lead Actor in a Drama Series. It is the second of four Emmys Franz won for the role.; Future King of Queens star Leah Remini appears as an angry suspect who throws a soda can at a half-drunk Sipowicz during an interrogation. Remini and Sharon Lawrence appeared together on the sitcom Fired Up.
| 66 | 22 | "He’s Not Guilty, He’s My Brother" | Michael M. Robin | Story by : Bill Clark & Bob Glaudini; Teleplay by : Bob Glaudini | May 21, 1996 | 0G22/5322 | 18.8 |
Sipowicz begins his comeback on the job by teaming with Simone and Russell to investigate a double-homicide at an auto repair store. The cops figure out the perpetrator is a veteran convict facing life without parole, but his good-citizen younger brother refuses to rat on his sibling. Martinez, Medavoy, and Lesniak catch the case of two murdered junkies. Greg finds a nice apartment he can afford, PAA John Irvin leaves the department to start his own business, Bobby and Diane decide to take some vacation time together, and Andy prays for the first time in a very long time during his son Theo's Greek Orthodox churching ceremony. Notes: Last appearance of Justine Miceli as Adrienne Lesniak.; Casey Siemaszko appears as Jim Bauerline. He would later appear as the squad's internal affairs nemesis, Captain Pat Fraker.; Lola Glaudini appears as Karen Thanos. She would return in season 5 as Patty Bell before appearing in season 6 as P.A.A. Dolores Mayo.; Robert Glaudini, who co-wrote this episode, is the father of Lola Glaudini and would return to play her character Dolores Mayo's father in season 6.; Neal McDonough appears as Jerry Selness; Tobin Bell appears as Donald Selness; This episode set up the short-lived spin-off series Public Morals.
