= NYPD Blue season 4 =

Season of television series

NYPD Blue
- Season 4
- Season 4 U.S. DVD cover
- No. of episodes: 22

Release
- Original network: ABC
- Original release: October 15, 1996 – May 20, 1997

Season chronology
- ← Previous; Season 3 Next → Season 5

The fourth season of NYPD Blue premiered on ABC on October 15, 1996, and concluded on May 20, 1997.

Actor	Character	Main cast	Recurring cast
Jimmy Smits	Bobby Simone	entire season	—N/a
Dennis Franz	Andy Sipowicz	entire season	—N/a
James McDaniel	Arthur Fancy	entire season	—N/a
Nicholas Turturro	James Martinez	entire season	—N/a
Sharon Lawrence	Sylvia Costas	credited in all but only appeared in 1, 7, 11, & 15	—N/a
Gordon Clapp	Greg Medavoy	entire season	—N/a
Kim Delaney	Diane Russell	entire season	—N/a
Andrea Thompson	Jill Kirkendall	—N/a	episodes 6–8, 10–14, 17–18, 20

== Episodes ==
No. overall	No. in season	Title	Directed by	Written by	Original release date	Prod. code	U.S. viewers (millions)
67	1	"Moby Greg"	Mark Tinker	Story by : David Milch & Bill Clark; Teleplay by : Theresa Rebeck	October 15, 1996	0H01/5401	21.57
Sipowicz and Simone catch the case of a dead man found in a trunk; evidence indicates the trunk had been dragged over precinct lines from the 13th. Greg and Andy, concerned over their expanding waistlines, declare a weight-loss contest, which Andy keeps postponing. Geri Turner is the new PAA. Bobby is surprised when he finds he has inherited an apartment building; he asks Diane to marry him and she says she is not ready for that. Notes: First appearance of Gina Colon (played by Lourdes Benedicto), who eventually marries Martinez.: Wood Harris guest stars as Hector.; Viola Davis guest stars as an unnamed character.
68	2	"Thick Stu"	Brad Silberling	Story by : David Milch & Bill Clark; Teleplay by : David Mills	October 22, 1996	0H02/5402	19.36
Det. Stu Morrissey has hit a dead end in his case of a missing baby girl and asks Sipowicz and Simone for help. Bobby tries to make peace with Henry Coffield, the tenant in his new building who believes Bobby stole the place that he should have gotten himself. Andy and Greg start their weight-loss competition. Martinez is running for Delegate against night-watch detective Vince Gotelli. Geri gets a little touchy-feely with Andy.
69	3	"Yes, We Have No Cannolis"	Mark Tinker	Story by : David Milch & Bill Clark; Teleplay by : Leonard Gardner	October 29, 1996	0H03/5403	20.38
A young woman was shot dead in Bobby's apartment building, in a manner Henry Coffield described as his likely fate only 24 hours before. An ex-con whom Simone put away years ago comes to him and says another man is in jail for a crime he didn't commit. Sipowicz remembers the case, a robbery where the getaway car hit and killed a female pedestrian, and struggles with guilt over not making his concerns over the results known to the veteran detectives running it. James wins the Delegate election by three votes. Diane calls Bobby selfish for wanting more than she can give. Geri makes another wholly inappropriate advance on Andy and he gets annoyed.
70	4	"Where's 'Swaldo"	Mark Tinker	Stephen Gaghan & Michael R. Perry and David Milch	November 12, 1996	0H05/5405	18.93
Activist Kwasi Olashula (Episode 3.10) is found shot to death in his car in the company of a drug dealer. Andy grapples with his history of bigotry while working to solve the case. James and Greg investigate a murder at a bodega.: Jurnee Smollett guest stars as Hanna.
71	5	"Where'd the Van Gogh"	Michael M. Robin	Story by : David Milch & Bill Clark; Teleplay by : Nicholas Wootton	November 19, 1996	0H04/5404	17.82
Sipowicz and Simone catch the case of an art burglary at the residence of an impoverished European prince and his well-to-do American wife. Her life hangs in the balance as the result of the beating she sustained at the hands of the burglars. James' first case as delegate is a sticky one when he has to deal with a detective who seems to have two wives. Diane gets an offer to return to OCCB work and reconnect with an arms dealer named Jimmy Liery who might have gone active again.: Christopher Meloni guest stars as Jimmy Liery.; Judy Reyes, who became well known for her later role in Scrubs, guest stars as Anna Ortiz.; Garret Dillahunt guest stars as Bryce Coopersmith; Dean Winters guest stars as Larry
72	6	"Yes Sir, That's My Baby"	Davis Guggenheim	Rift Fournier	November 26, 1996	0H06/5406	19.25
Detective Jill Kirkendall joins the 15th and immediately picks up a case where a guy is being threatened unless he marries an overweight young woman her brother claims he impregnated. Andy tells Fancy that Geri's behavior is bothering him, and Fancy has Geri and Gina switch working locations inside the 15th. A limo driver's murder is connected to a closeted businessman and his bad taste in male prostitutes. Diane remains in her undercover role. Bobby finally leans hard enough on Henry to find out the truth about the murder in his building. Note: First appearance of Andrea Thompson as Jill Kirkendall.
73	7	"Ted and Carey's Bogus Adventure"	Daniel Sackheim	Meredith Stiehm	December 3, 1996	0H07/5407	18.50
A developmentally disabled young girl is sexually assaulted by a group of rich students. The girl's angry mom and the meddling Councilman father (from Season 2's "Innuendo") of one of the kids roil Andy and Bobby, but everyone shares heartbreak when the young girl kills herself. Bobby advises her mom to sue the kids, and Sylvia Costas rocks the students by pointing out they will never face any punishment and can look forward to a life of being disgusting and contemptible. Diane is out on UC with Liery when a rollerblader bumps into her and Liery beats the guy, leaving her unable to forcefully protect the guy, though she does keep Liery from killing him. Diane later tells her OCCB boss that the work is getting to her, and has an ugly argument with Bobby. A mentally disturbed young man named Fred comes to the house babbling about his mother, and Andy finds out she died of a heart attack and Fred tried to bury her in a Dumpster. Sylvia talks about how she does not want to leave her job because she felt someone had to be there to try and get through to the rich young creeps from the case that day.
74	8	"Unembraceable You"	Michael M. Robin	Story by : Bill Clark & Theresa Rebeck; Teleplay by : Theresa Rebeck	December 10, 1996	0H08/5408	17.82
Diane goes over to Bobby's and they sleep together, but Bobby is not impressed with her idea of a casual relationship and asks her to leave. She throws herself into her undercover work with Jimmy Liery and gets a strong idea of how he is moving stolen guns, but Jimmy has a nasty plan of his own in mind for her. Bobby and Andy catch a murder case where the prime suspect is Arthur Cartwell, a smart but obnoxious guy who was involved with the brutal murders in "Heavin' Can Wait". Neither cop wants to cut Arthur any slack, until a new witness puts the case in a different light. Lt. Fancy is rocked when his former foster son, Maceo, is arrested for running drugs. Fancy has to deal with Maceo's rude and sullen behavior, the evil actions of Maceo's biological mom, and worthless cop Ray Kahlins (from "Hollie and the Blowfish") to save Maceo from a long prison sentence. Greg asks Abby out on a date and she tells him she is a lesbian, and he's stunned as he wonders if she's lying.
75	9	"Caulksmanship"	Donna Deitch	Story by : David Milch & Bill Clark; Teleplay by : George D. Putnam	December 17, 1996	0H09/5409	17.81
Diane wakes up in Jimmy Liery's apartment and has no idea what happened the night before. Jimmy denies he did anything, but he does not clarify what "anything" means until Diane fires one round about a foot to his left. Fancy is upset when the brass tells him Bobby is in line to get a promotion to Detective First Grade, but Andy will not, while his wife feels Andy is getting what he deserves (Fancy felt Andy deserved the promotion and is upset it was declined). Fancy decides that he can't cost Bobby an earned reward and tells him privately about the decision. The two top cops, meanwhile, are tied in knots when an overbearing woman was strangled and her browbeaten employee and the employee's boyfriend both claim guilt. And the rest of the cops are not getting any information in a tight-knit neighborhood when a repairman is shot to death.
76	10	"My Wild Irish Nose"	Bob Doherty	Hugh Levick	January 7, 1997	0H10/5410	17.80
Bobby finds out about Diane shooting at Liery when his neighbor makes a complaint, so Bobby visits Jimmy, beats him, and illegally seizes an AK-47 from the place. Diane is livid that Bobby interfered with her work, and Bobby is mad that Diane is acting like she has lost her mind. He asks for a day to deal with the case, and he and Andy proceed to tell one of Jimmy's contacts he is cooperating with the cops. At Bobby's promotion ceremony, Diane confronts Bobby with the news that Jimmy is dead. Bobby not only is not sorry about that, he tells Diane that if she wants to cry over Liery, then she should not even stay for the ceremony. Bobby tries to make Andy's case for advancement to the NYPD Commissioner, who is not receptive to the idea, but Andy ends up attending the ceremony anyway to support his partner. Andy and Bobby earlier try to help out a witness to a Mob killing who has had his prized paintings stolen, and have to save his life before they convince one of the killers to flip on his partners. James is reminded of his brother's problems when a young runaway witnesses a murder and he has to deal with the kid's abusive father. Note: In the Season 9 premiere, Andy is promoted to Detective First Grade.
77	11	"Alice Doesn't Fit Here Anymore"	Mark Tinker	Story by : David Milch & Bill Clark; Teleplay by : Leonard Gardner & Nicholas Wootton	January 14, 1997	0H11/5411	19.60
Gina the PAA is slashed and nearly raped by a vagrant, and James is ready to burn down the precinct to catch the guy. Greg and Diane convince him to be by Gina's side as she is treated for her injuries, and they later bring the creep in. When Greg's low-key approach does not work, Fancy sends in Andy, subtly suggesting he beat a confession out of the creep, and Andy does just that. Greg and Andy then have a conversation about the use of violence on the job, which does not make Andy feel all that good about himself. Diane remains on a knife's edge in the aftermath of Jimmy Liery's death and her growing estrangement from Bobby, not least after Bobby has a friendly dinner date with Jill Kirkendall. Diane later calls Andy from a diner because she is on the verge of relapsing into alcohol. The main case involves a diamond dealer's sister, who went missing with a large quantity of stones alongside her no-good boyfriend. And Sylvia decides to take an indefinite leave from work to care for baby Theo, leading Andy to say he will do moonlighting to earn extra money.
78	12	"Upstairs, Downstairs"	Paris Barclay	Story by : Bill Clark & David Mills; Teleplay by : David Mills	January 21, 1997	0H12/5412	18.89
A popular uniform cop who was bodyguarding a local Italian crooner says the crooner was shot to death by two men, but Andy and Bobby find themselves in serious conflict with the 15th's uniformed officers as this story produces more and more questions, egged on by a bully of a sergeant. Elsewhere, a teenaged girl's murder is connected to a grotesque fetish video and drugs, and Diane breaks down in Bobby's arms as she finally relates how her father sexually abused her for years.: Danny Masterson guest stars as Will Scheltema
79	13	"Tom and Geri"	Adam Nimoy	Story by : David Milch & Bill Clark; Teleplay by : Meredith Stiehm	January 28, 1997	0H13/5413	18.56
A construction site that is a battleground between shady outfits led by African Americans and Puerto Ricans becomes a murder scene when the number-two man from the latter coalition is shot to death. Andy and Bobby find out he was a good man who was targeted by a wide-ranging group of scummers, and they are not able to arrest anyone except a perfect patsy. Andy is disgusted when PAA Geri wants to talk to him, but she has news about a man's death. Diane and Jill are assigned to the case and learn the victim was close to Geri and into domination and S&M, but it falls to Andy to see through Geri's facade and help her avoid jail time. Elsewhere, Diane and Bobby's relationship finds a new solid ground on which to continue, and James and Gina have their first sleepover.
80	14	"A Remington Original"	Michael M. Robin	Story by : David Milch & Bill Clark; Teleplay by : Nicholas Wootton	February 11, 1997	0H14/5414	18.29
A junkyard car's trunk yields the body of a tortured female bartender. Andy and Bobby find a suspect in a nerdy guy with a porn fetish, and cook up a plan to insult him into confessing. Greg and James get a very odd death when a guy had his head crushed by a flying typewriter. Diane tells Bobby she is having therapy sessions, while Bobby gets sucked back into Henry Coffield's orbit when a crotchety old woman with a rent-controlled place in the building demands Henry do all of her household chores.
81	15	"Taillight's Last Gleaming"	Randy Zisk	David Mills	February 18, 1997	0H15/5415	17.22
Fancy and his wife are pulled over in Bayside, Queens, by two uniformed officers on the basis of driving in an all-white neighborhood. Fancy angrily plans to transfer the senior officer Szymanski to a precinct in Bedford-Stuyvesant, Brooklyn as punishment for his profiling actions, before some criticism from Captain Bass leads to Officer Szymanski's arrival at the 15th. Andy begins having dreams where he see his dead son, Andy Jr., but he is confused and angry about the uneven and pointed nature of their conversations. The dreams play into Andy's psyche when he and Bobby investigate a real life string of bar robberies. They have to deal with a stolen .45 automatic, the involvement in one robbery of Vince Gotelli, and a too-eager cop who is trying to solve the case on his own before they get a break and make arrests. Diane and James come up with a plan to bust scam artists who are ripping off disabled women. Andy learns he will need to find a different outlet to see his dead son in the future.: Tony Todd as Det. Eddie Hazell; Pat Crawford Brown as Mrs. Klein; Michael DeLuise as Andy Sipowicz, Jr.
82	16	"What A Dump!"	Perry Lang	Story by : David Milch & Bill Clark; Teleplay by : Leonard Gardner	February 25, 1997	0H16/5416	17.62
Sipowicz and Simone catch the case of a woman's body found in an alley, strangled and apparently raped. They learn she was a Russian mail-order bride and focus on her old American husband and a young Russian man she was having an affair with to solve the case. Medavoy, on edge over a mystery dinner with Abby, is uncharacteristically violent as he and Martinez investigate a drive-by where the vehicle was a city bus. Sipowicz has a night job as a marshal, and his first assignment has him thrilled: baby-sitting drug mules until they pass the drugs.: Robert Carradine guest stars as Gerard Salter
83	17	"A Wrenching Experience"	Michael Watkins	Story by : David Milch & Bill Clark; Teleplay by : Meredith Stiehm	April 15, 1997	0H17/5417	17.83
Simone and Sipowicz investigate the case of a young Latino shot on the street in front of his pregnant girlfriend. Nobody, including the girlfriend, is interested in being helpful; the likely reason develops when it turns out a local gang head honcho was involved. Medavoy and Martinez catch a shooting at an auto repair shop where the partner's son, who happened to be out of the shop at the time, acts hugely suspicious. The victim was a huge NYPD supporter and the top brass pushes Greg and James to use force to get a confession, but Greg has a different approach in mind and it succeeds. Russell and Kirkendall are assigned the case of a shaken Chinese baby who the doctor says isn't likely to make it. Greg, Abby, and Kathy finally have dinner together. Bobby and Diane see Jerry Maguire and Diane asks Bobby to show her...the engagement ring.: Lucy Liu guest stars as Amy Chu.
84	18	"I Love Lucy"	Kathy Bates	Story by : David Milch & Theresa Rebeck; Teleplay by : Theresa Rebeck	April 22, 1997	0H18/5418	15.88
Peaches and Angela (Episode 4.8) show up to complain that Angela's boyfriend is threatening her life if she doesn't have a sex change - but when they find out he will be arrested have second thoughts. Kirkendall solos on a case brought to the 15th by the parents of an old friend of hers when she steals a valuable pen from her father that was a graduation gift. Lt. Fancy reluctantly offers Amway-type products, that his wife is selling, to the squad. Bobby and Diane celebrate their engagement but a guy at the restaurant they're at who congratulates Bobby makes him visibly uncomfortable.: Ken Jenkins guest stars as Marshall Hastings.; Peter Onorati guest stars as Joey Salvo.
85	19	"Bad Rap"	Matthew Penn	Thad Mumford	April 29, 1997	0H19/5419	16.99
Andy and Bobby investigate the shooting of a rap star who does not want to cooperate and is much more hostile to the cops than to whoever shot him. It takes some stakeout time and a guilt trip, but the truth comes out in time. Fancy is upset when Officer Szymanski, whose actions in "Taillight's Last Gleaming" led to him being moved to the 15th, refuses to save himself when he is falsely accused of stealing drug money. Greg asks Abby exactly what she wants from him, and she says she wants him to be a sperm donor so she can have a baby. Bobby gets an unwanted visit from an FBI agent who wants him to do some undercover work regarding his old "friend" Joey Salvo, and Bobby later tells Diane a story that illustrates just what a bad guy Salvo is.
86	20	"Emission Impossible"	Bob Doherty	Story by : David Milch & Bill Clark; Teleplay by : Bill Barich	May 6, 1997	0H20/5420	15.16
A jumpy waiter leads Simone and Sipowicz to the killers of five Ecuadorians at a social club; a nervous Medavoy awaits Abby's ovulation and hampers Russell's interview strategy with a child molester; and Simone must withhold information from Sipowicz, who disapproves of his partner's undercover wardrobe.: Currie Graham guest-stars as Frankie Lankersheim, seven years before playing Lt. Thomas Bale.; Peter Onorati guest stars as Joey Salvo.
87	21	"Is Paris Burning?"	Paris Barclay	David Shore	May 13, 1997	0H21/5421	15.56
Bobby gets in trouble over the license plate he ran for Joey Salvo the previous week at the FBI's request when they will not stand up for him after IAB finds out about it, and he learns that the FBI suspects IAB of having someone on Salvo's payroll. Bobby's relationship with Andy gets worse as the secrecy about the case continues (though Andy learns Bobby has talked to Diane about it) and affects their investigation of a rape-assault. Andy tries to protect scared witness Steve Cameron, but indifference from ADA Leo Cohen and Bobby's focus being elsewhere leads to a horrible ending. The cops find out that Vince Gotelli hijacked a city bus while drunk and Fancy works to save Vince from jail time.: Richard Schiff guest stars as Steve Cameron; Kathryn Joosten, who would go on to work with Richard Schiff in The West Wing, guest stars as Mrs. Prows.
88	22	"A Draining Experience"	Michael Watkins	Jane Wallace	May 20, 1997	0H22/5422	17.26
Bobby gets suspended by IAB and told to follow the FBI's playbook, but Bobby breaks bounds to tell Andy the whole sad story. Andy and Diane have serious conflict over Bobby's situation, only putting them aside to investigate the murder of a young woman who was seeing a psychiatrist after being raped. A reporter who has little admiration for the NYPD's tactics is the victim of crime himself, and Greg and James deal with his attitude while doing their investigation. Bobby tells Joey Salvo he is out of a job, and Joey says he wants Bobby to come work for him, but then Joey is shot three times and killed.: Peter Onorati guest stars as Joey Salvo.
