= Turturro =

Turturro is an Italian surname. Notable people with the surname include:

- Aida Turturro (born 1962), American actress, cousin of John and Nicholas
- John Turturro (born 1957), American actor and filmmaker
- Nicholas Turturro (born 1962), American actor
