= James Martinez =

James Martinez may refer to:

- James Martinez (actor), American actor
- James Martinez (basketball) (born 1987), Filipino basketball player
- James Martinez (NYPD Blue), a fictional detective from the television series NYPD Blue
- James Martinez (wrestler) (born 1958), American wrestler
