= NYPD Blue season 12 =

Season of television series

NYPD Blue
- Season 12
- Season 12 U.S. DVD cover
- No. of episodes: 20

Release
- Original network: ABC
- Original release: September 21, 2004 – March 1, 2005

Season chronology
- ← Previous; Season 11

The twelfth and final season of NYPD Blue premiered on ABC on September 21, 2004, and concluded on March 1, 2005.

Actor	Character	Main cast	Recurring cast
Dennis Franz	Andy Sipowicz	entire season	—N/a
Mark-Paul Gosselaar	John Clark Jr.	entire season	—N/a
Gordon Clapp	Greg Medavoy	entire season	—N/a
Henry Simmons	Baldwin Jones	entire season	—N/a
Jacqueline Obradors	Rita Ortiz	entire season	—N/a
Bill Brochtrup	John Irvin	entire season	—N/a
Currie Graham	Thomas Bale	entire season	—N/a
Bonnie Somerville	Laura Murphy	entire season	—N/a
Jimmy Smits	Bobby Simone	—N/a	episode 6

Note: Garcelle Beauvais-Nilon, Jessalyn Gilsig, and John F. O'Donohue did not return for the twelfth season. With the exception of Eddie Gibson being replaced as squad commander, their absences are not explained to the audience.

== Episodes ==
No. overall	No. in season	Title	Directed by	Written by	Original release date	Prod. code	U.S. viewers (millions)
242	1	"Dress for Success"	Jesse Bochco	Story by : Bill Clark & Matt Olmstead; Teleplay by : Matt Olmstead	September 21, 2004	JB01/1201	9.68
Detective Laura Murphy joins the squad and has an uneasy start to her partnership with Ortiz. A new Lieutenant, Thomas Bale, formerly of Internal Affairs, takes command from Sergeant Gibson. Someone sends Sipowicz a dead rat and keys "PAB" ("Payback's A Bitch") into his car. Ortiz and Murphy investigate the murder of a homeless man while the rest of the squad work the murder of a doctor who is in town to research a book. Clark obviously still has not gotten over Devlin's suicide. Notes: Bonnie Somerville makes her first appearance as a Detective Laura Murphy; Currie Graham makes his first appearance as Lieutenant Thomas Bale. Graham had appeared in a different role in Season 4's "Emission Impossible".; The doctor's murder storyline is based loosely on the life of David Reimer and Dr. John Money.
243	2	"Fish Out of Water"	Jesse Bochco	Story by : Bill Clark & Nicholas Wootton; Teleplay by : Nicholas Wootton	September 28, 2004	JB02/1202	9.73
Bale announces his mandate from the department to make the "rogue" 15th squad reflect "today's policing" and insists on micromanaging the details of every case, which causes friction with the detectives. Cases include a dead 8-months pregnant woman in a dumpster and a push-in robbery. Investigation of the pregnant woman's death exposes an adoption scam. Andy and John Clark's relationship continues to deteriorate as John struggles to cope with Devlin's death and his father's suicide and takes out his anger on Andy. Andy's stalker poisons the fish in Andy's squad room tank. Notes: Guest stars include Mackenzie Phillips as Lorraine Stuval and Scott Atkinson as Steve McClintock
244	3	"Great Balls of Ire"	Mark Tinker	Story by : Bill Clark & Tom Szentgyörgyi; Teleplay by : Tom Szentgyörgyi	October 12, 2004	JB03/1203	8.72
Theo is briefly kidnapped, but returned unharmed. Sipowicz secretly tries to find out who is responsible while the rest of the squad works the case of a murdered rapist who had been harassed by one of his victims. Bale's latest irritating move is to mount the squad movement log next to the squad room door and put John Irvin in charge of ensuring detectives sign in and out whenever they arrive and depart. Sipowicz is barely speaking to Clark.
245	4	"Divorce Detective Style"	Mark Tinker	Story by : Bill Clark & Keith Eisner; Teleplay by : Keith Eisner	October 19, 2004	JB04/1204	8.43
Cases involving a young woman found in a closet who has been bludgeoned to death and a man's kidnapped son dovetail into one larger situation, and Bale's stupidity during the case leads Andy to blow up at him. During the trial of Steve McClintock, who is accused of murdering a pregnant woman ("Fish Out of Water") Clark's testimony is impeached when he admits to having sex with Carly, McClintock's girlfriend and co-defendant. Andy's stalker orders child sex abuse material with Andy's credit card, which brings a visit from the FBI. A police mechanic finds a bug in Andy's police car. John Irvin traces the manufacturer, enabling Andy to hunt for his stalker, which Bale tacitly allows. Following a lead developed by Medavoy, detectives find that the kidnapping was staged by the victim, and his conspirators killed his girlfriend, who was the young woman in the closet. When Clark has a flippant attitude about ruining the murder case, Andy informs Clark he is going to request a new partner. Notes: Guest stars include John de Lancie as Scott Garvin and Scott Atkinson as Steve McClintock.; (Elizabeth) Lisa Lackey's first episode in a recurring role as A.D.A. Lori Munson
246	5	"You’re Buggin’ Me"	John Hyams	Story by : Bill Clark & Greg Plageman; Teleplay by : Greg Plageman	October 26, 2004	JB05/1205	9.27
Andy attempts to pull a drunken John Clark from a bar and is shot by an unseen assailant. When he returns to the squad the next day, three AA "friends" confront him based on an anonymous tip they received and Andy has difficulty making them believe he had not been drinking. The bar's bouncer provides Ortiz and Murphy information about John's behavior at the bar, which does not concur with John's version. Medavoy finds out Hatcher's detective agency did a credit check on Andy. Andy confronts Stan and threatens to kill him if he does not stop stalking Andy. Hatcher recorded the conversation and reports the threats to the police department. Bale reluctantly brokers a deal with Hatcher's uncle, the deputy chief for personnel, who agrees that Andy will not be charged with any crimes in exchange for Hatcher's banishment to a private security job in Miami. Clark receives a verbal reprimand from Bale. Bale also tears into Andy because of the influence Bale had to expend to save Andy's career. Clark quietly asks Andy if they can stay partners and Andy agrees. Notes: Jonah Hill guest stars as a store clerk, in his television debut; Ed O'Ross guest stars as Pat Carr; Richard Fancy guest stars as Howard Seigal
247	6	"The Vision Thing"	Tawnia McKiernan	Story by : Bill Clark & William Finkelstein; Teleplay by : William Finkelstein	November 9, 2004	JB06/1206	10.76
After being brought up short by both Bale and Baldwin, Clark reassesses his recent behavior and makes a tentative move to mend fences with Sipowicz. A man is stabbed while riding the bus with his family. A video store clerk is stabbed by a robber. A wealthy antiques dealer reports a suspicious burglary. Medavoy takes a part-time job as bouncer at a bar. Andy has a surprise visitor who helps him gain perspective. Notes: Jimmy Smits makes an uncredited appearance as the spirit of Bobby Simone; Dennis Christopher guest stars as Mr. Prosser; Lee Garlington guest stars as Margaret Lidz; Richard Herd guest stars as Jimmy McGowan
248	7	"My Dinner With Andy"	Kevin Hooks	Story by : Bill Clark & Tom Szentgyörgyi; Teleplay by : Tom Szentgyörgyi	November 16, 2004	JB07/1207	9.05
John and Andy begin to put their relationship back together. A material witness in a murder case is beaten in an alley. John Clark volunteers to protect the witness, enabling him to begin repairing his relationship with Munson. Clark and Andy continue to deal with Bale's interference and micromanagement. Greg is caught moonlighting as a bouncer, placing his job at risk. Baldwin Jones wants custody of Michael — but so does Michael's criminal father. Notes: Barry Shabaka Henley guest stars as Archie Day; Jude Ciccolella guest stars as Simon Kerensky
249	8	"I Like Ike"	Jesse Bochco	Story by : Bill Clark & Keith Eisner; Teleplay by : Keith Eisner	November 23, 2004	JB08/1208	10.22
Lucy, the murder case witness Clark is voluntarily protecting, is fired at from a passing car. The shooting persuades Bale to authorize overtime so Ortiz and Murphy can take over the detail. Lucy reveals a name that enables detectives to identify other witnesses and solve the alley murder ("My Dinner With Andy"). Jones appears at a family court hearing, but Michael is missing and his father accuses Baldwin of hiding him. Greg pleads with Bale to informally handle the discipline for Greg's violation of department rules by working as a bar bouncer, but Bale insists he face a formal internal affairs hearing. Greg consults a department lawyer, who barely listens to him and says Greg's best move would be to have an unnecessary heart procedure so he can retire with 75 percent benefits. Andy prepares for the sergeant's exam and Bale volunteers to loan his study aids to Andy, who begrudgingly accepts.
250	9	"The 3-H Club"	Mark Tinker	Story by : Bill Clark, Greg Ball & Steve Blackman; Teleplay by : Greg Ball & Steve Blackman	November 30, 2004	JB09/1209	9.52
Michael's father Craig is shot and killed. Both Michael and Baldwin's off-duty gun are missing. Sipowicz and Clark investigate Baldwin and Michael as suspects. Greg's hearing officer orders him to forfeit five days' pay, but subjects him to no other discipline. Greg upbraids Bale for not handling his violation of the rules informally, and carries himself with more confidence afterwards. A boy is molested by someone driving a church van and Ortiz and Murphy have to deal with a cop whose personal experiences impact his behavior on the case. Michael and Baldwin's gun are found. Craig's murderer confesses. Notes: Christine Estabrook guest stars as Lynn Cahill; Gregg Daniel guest stars as Harold Barker; Paul Butcher guest stars as Eddie Cown; Mark Chaet guest stars as Norman Kerasic; Eddie Kehler guest stars as Eric Larson
251	10	"The Dead Donald"	Carol Banker	Story by : Bill Clark & Tom Szentgyörgyi; Teleplay by : Tom Szentgyörgyi	December 7, 2004	JB10/1210	9.81
The brother of a mentally disabled man is found dead. A conman rents the same apartment to multiple parties. Greg makes a connection with one of the conman's victims, realtor Bridgid Scofield. Andy and John Clark clash with Bale when Bale decides to conduct a sting on an upset father who offers a bribe to drop drug charges against his son, rather than simply warning the father not to follow through. Sipowicz takes the sergeant's exam. Bale is enraged when the father who offered the bribe returns and tells Bale he has no idea what Bale is talking about. Bale blames Andy, but Andy's response makes Bale into a joke to the squad and he backs off. Rita later reveals to Andy that she warned the father, and does not regret it. Notes: Mary Page Keller guest stars in a recurring role as Realtor Brigid Scofield; Corey Stoll guest stars as Martin Schweiss; Nikita Ager guest stars as Alyssa Pelikan
252	11	"Bale Out"	Jake Paltrow	Story by : Bill Clark & Keith Eisner; Teleplay by : Keith Eisner	December 14, 2004	JB11/1211	10.32
While investigating closeted gay men who have been beaten and robbed, Andy finds Bale's credit card in the suspect's home. Andy returns the card to Bale and says he has no intention of looking into the matter any further, prompting a change in Bale's demeanor toward the detectives. A respected attorney is shot to death in his car. Ortiz and Murphy investigate a drive-by shooting at a basketball court. Clark accompanies A.D.A. Munson to a party honoring a lecherous judge. Greg and Bridgid have a lunch date. Notes: Chad Allen guest stars as Kyle Tanner; David Garrison guest stars as Dr. Russell Fain; Ricky Harris guest stars as Stanley Newell; Arjay Smith guest stars as Tyler Newell
253	12	"I Love My Wives, But Oh You Kid"	Alan Rosenberg	Story by : Bill Clark & William Finkelstein; Teleplay by : William Finkelstein	December 21, 2004	JB12/1212	10.38
A young pregnant woman is murdered, and the detectives find that the father is a bigamist whose two families hold the key to solving the case. Attractive young women who had just begun attending Alcoholics Anonymous meetings are being killed. Andy leads the squad in an undercover investigation to find the killer. Greg helps Bridgid close a sale. Notes: Corbin Bernsen guest stars as Bob Cavanaugh; Rae Allen guest stars as Bertha Kunitz; William Russ guest stars as Hal Matheson; Judith Hoag guest stars as Paige Matheson; Robin Bartlett guest stars as Evelyn Winkler; Kimberly Quinn guest stars as Annabelle Rhulen 'Matheson'
254	13	"Stoli With a Twist"	Jesse Bochco	Story by : Bill Clark & Tom Szentgyörgyi; Teleplay by : Tom Szentgyörgyi	January 11, 2005	JB13/1213	9.61
Ortiz and Murphy go undercover to catch the AA killer. Steve McClintock is found stabbed to death in his apartment, which is full of steroids. The investigation leads Clark to Steve's girlfriend Carly, the witness with whom Clark previously had sex. Steve's killer claims Carly set up Steve to be robbed, but that Steve was not supposed to be home. Clark believes Carly arranged things so that Steve would be killed, but is unable to prove it, though Carly confesses to setting up the robbery and will face major prison time anyway. ADA Munson is initially angry at Clark over Carly's return but apologizes when she notices the change in his demeanor. Bale informs Andy unofficially that he has passed the sergeant's exam. Notes: Zeljko Ivanek guest stars as Justin Deroos; Myndy Crist guest stars as Carly Landis; Jim Metzler guest stars as Roger Harborn; Joanna Canton guest stars as Kerri Heath; Sasha Mitchell guest stars as Darian Lasalle; Scott Atkinson guest stars as Steve McClintock
255	14	"Stratis Fear"	Bob Doherty	Story by : Bill Clark & Keith Eisner; Teleplay by : Keith Eisner	January 18, 2005	JB14/1214	9.00
Andy and John Clark investigate the murder of a successful immigrant restaurateur with a taste for young girls. Ortiz learns the Joint Narcotics Task Force is after the boyfriend of Rita's cousin Paula, and that Paula may be involved. Greg and Baldwin probe the murder of a public relations consultant whose clients included a famous, paralyzed former cop. Ortiz and Murphy arrange to arrest Paula with a small amount of drugs, preserving the federal investigation into Paula's boyfriend while removing Paula from involvement. Notes: Terri Hoyos guest stars as Aunt Sylvia; Robb Derringer guest stars as Robert 'Bobby' Friedman; Mike Genovese guest stars as Charlie Quinn; JB Blanc guest stars as Alex Stratis
256	15	"La Bomba"	Mark Tinker	Story by : Bill Clark & Greg Plageman; Teleplay by : Greg Plageman	January 25, 2005	JB15/1215	9.41
Sipowicz and Clark investigate when a wealthy businessman is killed in a car explosion. They pursue the victim's business dealings in Colombia and an Israeli ex-security guard, but find that the victim's cold-hearted daughter holds the key to solving the case. Ortiz and Murphy investigate the death of a teenager who was beaten to death in an alley. Notes: Geoff Pierson guest stars as Phil Beckett; Cindy Pickett guest stars as Francine Beckett; Lynsey Bartilson guest stars as Quinnie Stein; Jeffrey Licon guest stars as Javier Garcia; Adoni Maropis guest stars as Avi Mosher; Shannon O'Hurley guest stars as Rachel Tinsley
257	16	"Old Man Quiver"	Ed Begley, Jr.	Story by : Bill Clark & William Finkelstein; Teleplay by : William Finkelstein	February 1, 2005	JB16/1216	10.63
Sipowicz and Clark investigate when an elderly millionaire whose wife is more than 50 years younger is found smothered to death. Medavoy and Jones look into the murder of a State Supreme Court judge's elderly mother at a retirement home. Munson introduces Clark to her arrogant and powerful father. Sipowicz is promoted to sergeant. Notes: Nichole Hiltz guest stars as Amy Rasmussen; Nan Martin guest stars as Enid; William McNamara guest stars as Richard Pencara; Anna Berger guest stars as Belle; Rikki Klieman guest stars as Nora Rosenthal; Octavia Spencer guest stars as Elanor Jackson; John Aprea guest stars as Owen Munsen
258	17	"Sergeant Sipowicz' Lonely Hearts Club Band"	John Hyams	Story by : Bill Clark & Tom Szentgyörgyi; Teleplay by : Tom Szentgyörgyi	February 8, 2005	JB17/1217	9.74
A U.S. Army recruiter is shot to death and Clark suspects the brother of a soldier killed in Iraq. Medavoy and Jones investigate the death of a homeless man whose body was found dead in a dumpster and find a connection to Murphy's first case after being assigned to the 15th precinct. Bridgid makes Greg an offer he cannot refuse and Greg tells Baldwin he intends to retire from the police force to join Bridgid's real estate business. Notes: Jeffrey D. Sams guest stars as Steve Nutting; Sean Marquette guest stars as Paul Corbelli; Ernie Grunwald guest stars as Jonas Grissom; Jon Manfrellotti guest stars as Ed Corbelli
259	18	"Lenny Scissorhands"	Rick Wallace	Story by : Bill Clark & Keith Eisner; Teleplay by : Keith Eisner	February 15, 2005	JB18/1218	9.78
Sipowicz, Murphy and Ortiz investigate the shooting of a fellow police officer. Clark and Jones become partners and investigate the beating death of a woman whose newly religious husband owns a jewelry store. Bale is shot during the course of a murder investigation. Medavoy makes his retirement official. Notes: Alan Rosenberg guest stars as Barry Olshan; Carlos Gomez guest stars as Anthony Perez; Jennifer Jostyn guest stars as Teresa Donatelli; Ken Lerner guest stars as Norman Hanes; Nealla Gordon guest stars as Margaret Gregorek; James Martin Kelly guest stars as Chief Duffy; Debi Mazar guest stars as Maxine Annuziato; Alex Veadov guest stars as Sergei Yesenin
260	19	"Bale to the Chief"	Jesse Bochco	Story by : Bill Clark, Tom Szentgyörgyi & Keith Eisner; Teleplay by : Tom Szentgyörgyi & Keith Eisner	February 22, 2005	JB19/1219	10.60
Bale is hospitalized and his temporary replacement is more interested in playing golf than running the detective squad. When a young Muslim bride is found stabbed to death, Ortiz and Murphy suspect her husband. Sipowicz, Clark, and Jones arrest the man who shot Bale. Bale reveals he is permanently disabled and recommends to the chief of detectives that Sipowicz take over as the commander of the detective squad. At the celebration that includes Medavoy's retirement, the chief of detectives gives Andy the chance to make the case for why he should be the new squad commander and agrees to give him the job. Notes: Natasha Alam guest stars as Elena; Sam McMurray guest stars as Lieutenant Jeff Henry; Shishir Kurup guest stars as Adeeb Amar; James Martin Kelly guest stars as Chief Duffy
261	20	"Moving Day"	Mark Tinker	Story by : Steven Bochco, Bill Clark & William Finkelstein; Teleplay by : William Finkelstein	March 1, 2005	JB20/1220	16.08
Ray Quinn and Joe Slovak join the detective squad. Andy questions his decision to take over as detective squad commander after top brass try to stop the investigation of a rich and powerful murder suspect. Medavoy stops by while on a sales call and realizes that organizations continue to function even after one person leaves. Bale commends Andy for continuing to search for the truth and defending the detectives from the bosses, even though the chief of detectives had ordered him not to pursue the case. Notes: Bill Smitrovich guest stars as Al Angelotti; Stanley Anderson guest stars as Robert Heilbrenner; Joseph Sikora guest stars as Detective Joe Slovak; Vince Corazza guest stars as Detective Ray Quinn; Keone Young guest stars as Akira Nikada; Gwendoline Yeo guest stars as Ai Wantanabe; Danica McKellar guest stars as Rosemary Wyatt; Patty McCormack guest stars as Jeannie Wyatt; Dan Ziskie guest stars as Inspector Dowdell
