= Baldwin Jones =

- NYPD Blue character
- First appearance: “Along Came Jones” (7x07)
- Last appearance: “Moving Day” (12x20)
- Portrayed by: Henry Simmons

Baldwin Jones is a fictional character in the television series NYPD Blue. He was played by Henry Simmons from Season 7 until the end of the series in Season 12.

== Biography ==
Jones's mother named him for the writer James Baldwin. He had previously worked in the police department's bias crimes unit, and transferred into the 15th Precinct to replace James Martinez.

Joe Abner, a bitter African-American lieutenant, previously commanded Baldwin Jones in the Bias Incident Investigation Unit. Abner held a grudge against Jones's boss, Lieutenant Fancy over Fancy's refusal to get rid of Andy Sipowicz for his racist attitudes, but later revealed he steered Jones to Fancy's command so he would learn from a good boss in a position (general squad work) he was more suited for than judging whether cases involved hate crimes.

Abner was depressed over the belief that his work had not done anything to change racism in the department, and he committed suicide, which had a negative effect on the emotions of both Fancy and Jones--they both knew if they had liked Abner more personally they would have interceded to get him help.

Jones had an imposing physique -- he was well over six feet tall, and worked out regularly. When the situation demanded it, he used his size and strength to intimidate suspects. Jones and Greg Medavoy became close friends and solid partners, with Jones often using his calm and direct demeanor to hide his irritation and immediately refocus Medavoy when Medavoy talked too long about some inane subject, or otherwise displayed his neurotic tendencies.

Jones and Assistant District Attorney Valerie Haywood had an on-again, off-again relationship, which included a pregnancy and miscarriage. Jones later took on the parenting role for a troubled teenager named Michael Woodruff, whom he took responsibility for after investigating the murder of Woodruff's mother by his father.

== Sources ==
=== Internet ===
- Sepinwall, Alan. "Biographies: Baldwin Jones, Henry Simmons". NYPD Blue Online. Archived from the original on June 19, 2000.
- Kendall, G. (June 7, 2016). "NYPD Blue Season One, The Guest Stars". The Milch Studies. Gentlemen of Leisure.

=== Newspapers ===
- Mills, Nancy (March 19, 2000). "The Sexiest Man on TV: Henry Simmons cuts an arresting figure on 'NYPD Blue'". New York Daily News. New York, NY. Archived from the original on December 1, 2016.
