= Bobby Simone =

Fictional character in television series NYPD Blue

- NYPD Blue character
- Jimmy Smits as Bobby Simone
- First appearance: "Simone Says"
- Last appearance: "Hearts and Souls" (last regular appearance) "The Vision Thing" (guest appearance)
- Portrayed by: Jimmy Smits

In-universe information
- Gender: Male
- Occupation: NYPD Detective
- Spouse: Maria "Mary" Cimino (unseen first wife, died of cancer); Diane Russell (long-term relationship from season 3 on, married at end of season 5)
- Partner: Andy Sipowicz

Detective Robert "Bobby" Simone is a fictional character in the American television series NYPD Blue. Played by Jimmy Smits for four seasons, Simone is known for his sensitivity and street smarts, as well as his friendship with his detective-partner Andy Sipowicz.

He was introduced in the fifth episode of the second season remaining until the fifth episode of the sixth.

== Character biography ==
Simone was raised in Brooklyn, where he attended Catholic school at Our Lady of Perpetual Help. His ancestry and place of birth are ambiguous; see below.

== Storylines ==
Simone was introduced to the squad after Andy Sipowicz's former partner, John Kelly, was forced to leave the NYPD in the face of an IAB witch hunt. His previous job had been as a driver for the police commissioner, a role that initially riled Sipowicz. However, Simone explained that he had asked for the job so he could spend more time with his wife as she was dying from cancer. It is also gradually revealed that Simone is a highly experienced and competent police officer, who had earned the rank of Detective Second Grade prior to his driving assignment.

An early bond and friendship between the partners was strong enough that Andy asked Simone to step in after John Kelly couldn't make it back to New York for Sipowicz's wedding to Sylvia Costas. Bobby and Andy became great friends and partners, although Bobby did not let Andy get away with making racist comments around him. It is later learned that Bobby was a quiet kid whose passion for raising racing pigeons came from his friendship with a retired boxer (who later showed early signs of Alzheimer's), and that he had a flashy older friend named Ray DiSalvo whom he idolized—which came back to haunt him when Ray became a petty criminal and tried unsuccessfully to sell Bobby out to IAB for giving him an implicit warning to avoid a drug bust. Simone carried a Glock 17 as his service weapon.

Bobby mentions in season 2 that he worked his first homicide as a detective in late 1979. If he became a detective no earlier than age 28 as is common for characters in the series, then this places his birth date at no later than 1951 and his joining the police force at approximately 1972.

Early on in his time in the squad Simone started a relationship with Diane Russell, another detective at the 15th Precinct. According to NYPD guidelines the police department did not allow such couplings for officers who worked in the same precinct, so the couple kept it quiet up until the point that they were married by a justice of the peace (Lt Arthur Fancy also knew they were dating, but never officially notified the higher-ups about it). Simone earlier had to convince Diane that she had a drinking problem but was a source of strength and comfort for her as she successfully battled the demons in her past. The couple also conceived a child, but Diane had a miscarriage in season 5. In that season's finale, Bobby and Diane were married at City Hall.

In the premiere of Season 4, Bobby inherits an apartment building from his late wife's aunt. Over the following two years, this causes a series of conflicts between Bobby and Henry Coffield, the cousin of Bobby's deceased wife. Henry's neuroses, drug use, and chronic unemployment lead him to intersect with several of the squad's criminal cases.

Shortly after the wedding, Simone contracted a critical heart infection that required a heart transplant. Although the transplant was successful and it initially seemed that Bobby would be discharged from hospital, he developed a Gram-positive bacterial infection which soon spread to his brain and other vital organs, causing a quick decline in his health. Due to his being on immunosuppressants at the time to keep his body from rejecting the heart, his immune system was not strong enough to withstand the infection, and he ultimately died, devastating Diane, Andy, and the rest of the team at the 15th. He was succeeded as Andy's partner by Danny Sorenson.

Bobby returned, in an episode of the show's final season, as a spirit offering guidance and comfort to a troubled Andy.

== Ethnic ancestry ==
In the season 5 episode "Prostrate Before The Law", Simone is dealing with a white supremacist suspected of a murder, who assumes he is Puerto Rican. Simone retorts that he is of French and Portuguese descent and that his parents met in Belize, where Simone was born and lived for three years before immigrating to the U.S. The character had earlier alluded to this ethnic background during an argument with Sipowicz in season 2 episode "Double Abandando".

Other episodes, especially the locker room confrontation with Sipowicz over racism in season 4 episode "Where's Swaldo", strongly imply that Simone is in fact New York-born and of Puerto Rican or other Latino ancestry, and that the "French-Portuguese" immigrant story was some combination of Simone working an investigative angle with the racist suspect, or seeking to avoid career complications with bigots in the department.

Simone's first wife, and several recurring characters depicted as long-term residents of Simone's childhood neighborhood in Brooklyn, are all Italian-American.
