= Her Hidden Truth =

- UK VHS cover
- Genre: Thriller; Drama
- Written by: Pamela K. Long
- Directed by: Dan Lerner
- Starring: Kellie Martin; Antonio Sabato Jr. Ken Howard
- Theme music composer: Patrick Williams
- Country of origin: United States
- Original language: English

Production
- Executive producers: Stockton Briggle; Pamela K. Long
- Producer: Anthony Santa Croce
- Production location: Nashville
- Cinematography: Michael Gershman
- Editor: Victor DuBois
- Running time: 96 minutes
- Production companies: Ascato TV Inc. NBC Productions

Original release
- Network: NBC
- Release: November 12, 1995

Her Hidden Truth is a thriller/drama television film starring Kellie Martin, Antonio Sabato Jr. and Ken Howard. It was directed by Dan Lerner and written by Pamela K. Long, who was also one of the film's producers. The film first aired on Sunday, November 12, 1995 on NBC.

== Plot ==
Young teenager Billie Calhoun is wrongly accused of setting a deadly arson fire that killed her mother and sister. After years in a juvenile detention center, she requests an early release around the age of 18, but it is denied. During the journey back to the center, she escapes the prison van to find the real killer of her mother and sister. Out on her own, she disguises herself and befriends a young cop named Matt Samoni, and together they set out to uncover the truth.

== Cast ==
- Kellie Martin as Billie Calhoun
- Alisan Porter as Young Billie
- Antonio Sabato Jr. as Det. Matt Samoni
- Ken Howard as Jack Devereaux
- Reed Diamond as Clay Devereaux
- Bruce Weitz as Lt. Ricky Levine
- Cindy Pickett as Laney Devereaux
- Gordon Clapp as Father Paul
- Mary Donnelly Haskell as Dr. Jane Wilson
- Lisa Thornhill as Jean Calhoun
- Red West as Fireman Leon Sykes
- Harold Surratt as Jazz, Lab Tech
- Dennis Letts as the Prosecutor
- Diana Taylor as Officer Val Johnson
- David Dwyer as Mr. Gleason
- Levi Frazier Jr. as Chairman Howell

== Background ==
The film stars Kellie Martin as Billie Calhoun, Antonio Sabato Jr. as Det. Matt Samoni and Ken Howard as Jack Devereaux. Others in the film include Reed Diamond as Clay Devereaux, Bruce Weitz as Lt. Ricky Levine, Cindy Pickett as Laney Devereaux and Gordon Clapp as Father Paul.

Today, the film only remains on out-of-print and hard-to-find VHS, released exclusively in the UK via Sony and Odyssey. The release was on May 14, 1997, almost two years after the original American broadcasting. The film has never received a DVD release. In recent times, the movie can often be found unofficially on DVD.

The film's tagline on the UK VHS release reads "Eight years ago Billie was accused of murder, but who really killed her mother?"

The film was filmed in Nashville, Tennessee.

Her Hidden Truth was created by production companies Ascato TV Inc. and NBC Productions.

== Critical reception ==
Allmovie gave the film two out of five stars.
