= NYPD Blue =

American television police procedural (1993–2005)

- Genre: Police procedural
- Created by: Steven Bochco; David Milch
- Starring: (See: Main cast)
- Music by: Mike Post; Edward Rogers
- Country of origin: United States
- Original language: English
- No. of seasons: 12
- No. of episodes: 261 (list of episodes)

Production
- Executive producers: Steven Bochco; David Milch; Matt Olmstead; Nicholas Wootton; Bill Clark; Mark Tinker; Hans VanDoornewaard; William M. Finkelstein; Gregory Hoblit
- Producers: Leonard Gardner; Paris Barclay; Steven DePaul
- Running time: 47–49 minutes
- Production companies: Steven Bochco Productions; 20th Century Fox Television (Note: credited as 20th Television between 1993–1995 due to TCFTV going on a 2-year hiatus)

Original release
- Network: ABC
- Release: September 21, 1993 – March 1, 2005

Related
- Brooklyn South; Public Morals

NYPD Blue is an American police procedural television series set in New York City, exploring the struggles of the fictional 15th Precinct detective squad in Manhattan. Each episode typically intertwines several plots involving an ensemble cast. The show was created by Steven Bochco and David Milch, and was inspired by Milch's relationship with Bill Clark, a former member of the New York City Police Department, who eventually became one of the show's producers. The series was produced by Steven Bochco Productions and 20th Century Fox Television and originally broadcast by ABC from September 21, 1993‚ to March 1, 2005. It was ABC's longest-running primetime one-hour drama series until Grey's Anatomy surpassed it in 2016.

NYPD Blue was met with critical acclaim, praised for its grittiness and realistic portrayal of the cast's personal and professional lives. However, the show garnered controversy for its depictions of nudity and alcoholism. In 1997, "True Confessions" (season one, episode four), written by Art Monterastelli and directed by Charles Haid, was ranked number 36 on "TV Guide's 100 Greatest Episodes of All Time". In 1998, "Hearts and Souls" (season six, episode five), Jimmy Smits' final episode as a main cast member, ranked 30th on TV Guide's "100 Greatest Episodes of All Time".

== Main cast ==
Character	Actor	Position	Seasons											
Character	Actor	Position	1	2	3	4	5	6	7	8	9	10	11	12
John Kelly	David Caruso	Senior Detective	Main	Main										
Andy Sipowicz	Dennis Franz	Junior Detective, Senior Detective, Sergeant	Main	Main	Main	Main	Main	Main	Main	Main	Main	Main	Main	Main
Arthur Fancy	James McDaniel	Lieutenant, Captain	Main	Main	Main	Main	Main	Main	Main	Main				
Laura Michaels Kelly	Sherry Stringfield	A.D.A.	M											
Janice Licalsi	Amy Brenneman	Officer, Junior Detective	Main	Main										
James Martinez	Nicholas Turturro	Officer, Junior Detective, Senior Detective, Sergeant	Main	Main	Main	Main	Main	Main	Main					
Sylvia Costas	Sharon Lawrence	A.D.A.	R	Main	Main	Main	R	M						
Greg Medavoy	Gordon Clapp	Senior Detective	R	Main	Main	Main	Main	Main	Main	Main	Main	Main	Main	Main
Donna Abandando	Gail O'Grady	P.A.A.	R	Main	Main			G						
Bobby Simone	Jimmy Smits	Senior Detective		Main	Main	Main	Main	Main						G
Adrienne Lesniak	Justine Miceli	Junior Detective		R	M									
Diane Russell	Kim Delaney	Senior Detective		R	Main	Main	Main	Main	Main	Main		Guest	Guest	
Jill Kirkendall	Andrea Thompson	Junior Detective				R	Main	Main	Main					
John Irvin	Bill Brochtrup	P.A.A.		Recurring	Recurring		R	Main	Main	Main	Main	Main	Main	Main
Danny Sorenson	Rick Schroder	Junior Detective						Main	Main	Main				
Baldwin Jones	Henry Simmons	Senior Detective							Main	Main	Main	Main	Main	Main
Valerie Haywood	Garcelle Beauvais	A.D.A.								Main	Main	Main	Main	
Connie McDowell	Charlotte Ross	Junior Detective								Main	Main	Main	Main	
Tony Rodriguez	Esai Morales	Lieutenant								Main	Main	Main	Main	
John Clark Jr.	Mark-Paul Gosselaar	Officer, Junior Detective									Main	Main	Main	Main
Rita Ortiz	Jacqueline Obradors	Junior Detective									Main	Main	Main	Main
Eddie Gibson	John F. O'Donohue	Junior Detective, Senior Detective, Sergeant							Recurring	Recurring	Recurring	G	M	
Thomas Bale	Currie Graham	Lieutenant												M
Laura Murphy	Bonnie Somerville	Senior Detective												M

Main
Recurring
Guest

== Production and crew ==
Produced by 20th Century Fox and Steven Bochco Productions, film production primarily took place in the greater Los Angeles area. The show did film in New York, but only for exterior shots that used New York landmarks. In the final season, the show was filmed only in Los Angeles to save money.

The series was shot on film and framed for a 16:9 ratio from the first episode, though it was not natively broadcast in HD until season 9. In 2016, the first eight seasons were remastered into a 2K resolution HD image for use in future syndication and streaming releases. The 90-minute versions of "Lost Israel, Part 2", "Honeymoon at Viagra Falls", and "Hearts and Souls" were not included in this project and are available only on the DVD releases, as standard definition 4:3 episodes. The streaming remastered editions use the 60-minute versions of those episodes.

Exterior shots of the 15th Precinct used the 9th Precinct building on East 5th Street in New York City, also used for Kojak.

The show was initially a vehicle for David Caruso. John Kelly was the main character, and the first season revolved around him and his professional and personal lives. Promotional shots for the show depicted Caruso in the foreground and other first-season characters set off behind him. Season two had the departure of John Kelly, and the show was thereafter built around an ensemble cast.

Dennis Franz, as Andy Sipowicz, a veteran New York City Police detective, evolved into the show's lead character, who increasingly assumed a mentorship role to other characters as the series progressed. His co-stars included (season two and beyond) Jimmy Smits as Det. Bobby Simone (1994–1998), Rick Schroder as Det. Danny Sorenson (1998–2001), and Mark-Paul Gosselaar as Det. John Clark, Jr. (2001–2005).

=== Music ===
The show used an instrumental theme by prolific TV composer Mike Post, which did not change throughout the run of the series. The theme begins with a percussion arrangement reminiscent of the sound of a New York City Subway train departing a station and then proceeds to an oboe-dominated melody influenced by the Irish-American music used at NYPD ceremonies. Each episode had a cold open scene followed by the full-length theme song over the opening credits. The cold open and scene transitions used short instrumental breaks reminiscent of the main theme. As the series progressed, the musical start of the cold opens grew longer. By season seven, each episode began with a fast-paced montage of typical Manhattan street scenes unrelated to the show's characters, scored with an increasingly complex combination of scat singing and instrumental music riffing on the main theme. The specific variations were original to each episode and were not reused. Some especially dramatic or dialogue-free scenes were scored during particular episodes, but otherwise the main body of scenes used only limited diegetic music. A section of the main theme played again over the closing credits.

== Plot ==
=== Season 1 ===
Original cast (from left): Caruso, Franz, Stringfield, McDaniel, Turturro, and Brenneman

John Kelly and Andy Sipowicz are detectives in the 15th squad. Sipowicz is the elder partner, but is an alcoholic who drinks on the job, as well as off duty, and his behavior causes doubt that the partnership will last much longer. Kelly has a genuine affection for his partner, but becomes increasingly exasperated by Sipowicz's behavior. In addition to his alcoholism, Sipowicz is a deeply negative, misogynist, homophobic man. In the pilot, Sipowicz is shot by a suspect he had attacked and humiliated earlier. This leads to his decision to sober up and save his job. While Sipowicz is recuperating, the squad's lieutenant, Arthur Fancy, teams Kelly with a young cop from Anticrime, James Martinez.

Kelly's personal life is as frenetic as his professional life. He is reluctantly going through a divorce from his wife, Laura, and is embarking on an affair with a uniformed cop, Janice Licalsi. To complicate matters further, Licalsi's police-officer father is on the payroll of mob boss Angelo Marino. Licalsi, in an attempt to protect her father, has been ordered to do a "hit" on Kelly. Instead, Licalsi murders Marino, and the repercussions come back to haunt both Kelly and her.

Sipowicz, meanwhile, sobers up and begins a relationship with ADA Sylvia Costas. The other detective in the squad, Greg Medavoy, a married man, embarks on an affair with the squad's new administrative aide, Donna Abandando.

=== Season 2 ===
Licalsi is found guilty of the manslaughter of Marino and his driver, and is given a two-year sentence. Because of Kelly's involvement with Licalsi, and the widely held belief that he withheld evidence that could have given her a longer sentence, he is transferred out of the 15th to working as a dispatcher and subsequently chooses to leave the department altogether. He is replaced by Bobby Simone, a widower whose previous job was that of driver for the police commissioner. This does not sit well with Sipowicz, but after learning that Simone took the assignment to be present for his wife, who was suffering from cancer, Sipowicz learns to accept his new partner, and eventually builds a strong friendship with him. When Sipowicz's relationship with Sylvia leads to marriage, he asks Simone to be his best man.

After an affair with a journalist whom he suspects has used information that he disclosed to her after an intimate moment to boost her career, Simone begins a relationship with another new member of the squad, Diane Russell. Sipowicz, as a recovering alcoholic, recognizes from Russell's behavior that she also has a drinking problem. After much prompting, she begins attending Alcoholics Anonymous (AA). In another storyline, due to his low self-esteem and disbelief that a woman like Donna could love him, Medavoy's relationship with her breaks down, due in no small part to Donna's visiting sister.

=== Season 3 ===
Main police cast of season three of NYPD Blue, l-r Turturro, Smits, Delaney, McDaniel, Miceli, Clapp, Franz

At the beginning of the season, Sylvia becomes pregnant with Andy's child. A baby boy, Theo, is born towards the end of the season. This is contrasted with the fate that awaits Sipowicz's older son, Andy Jr., who announces that he plans to join the police force in nearby Hackensack, New Jersey, after being discharged from the Air Force due to an injury. Sipowicz is finally bonding with his long-estranged son when Andy Jr. is gunned down trying to help people in a bar holdup. This causes the elder Sipowicz to fall off the wagon. Simone kills Andy Jr.'s murderers in an act of self-defense while attempting to arrest them.

Bobby and Diane, who had placed their relationship on hold while she attended AA, resume seeing each other. Diane begins drinking again when her abusive father beats her mother. Her father is eventually killed, and her mother becomes the prime suspect.

James Martinez and new detective Adrienne Lesniak begin an affair, but Lesniak later breaks it off, because her last relationship with a fellow cop ended disastrously, and tells Medavoy (Martinez's partner and the squad gossip) that she is gay. After James is shot, recovers, and returns to work, and Lesniak and he get to know each other, she admits that the story she told Medavoy was a lie. Martinez later breaks up with her due to her controlling and unpleasant behavior, and Lesniak eventually leaves the squad. Medavoy leaves his wife, recognizing that she is holding him back, but it is too late to save his relationship with Donna, who leaves to take a job with Apple in California.

=== Seasons 4–5 ===
Main cast at the beginning of season seven of NYPD Blue, l-r Thompson, Delaney, Brochtrup, Franz, Turturro, Schroder, McDaniel, Clapp

During the next two seasons, a few minor cast changes are made; Donna is replaced by several PAAs, most notably by Gina Colon (played by Lourdes Benedicto), who eventually marries Martinez and is written out, and Det. Jill Kirkendall (played by Andrea Thompson) is partnered with Russell. Sipowicz's battle with prostate cancer and the up-and-down Simone/Russell relationship, which includes Russell's revelation that she had been sexually abused by her father, are prominent storylines. Also, during this time, Franz won four Emmy Awards, and both Delaney and Clapp won an Emmy for supporting roles.

=== Seasons 6–8 ===
Season six is a major turning point for the series, as Smits decided not to renew his contract and left the show. In episode five, "Heart and Souls", just episodes after marrying Russell, Simone dies due to an enlarged heart and a subsequent infection caused by complications from a heart transplant. Smits was replaced by Rick Schroder, as Det. Danny Sorenson.

Two additional critical incidents occur during season six, the heroin overdose death of PAA Dolores Mayo (played by Lola Glaudini), and the death of Costas, who is accidentally gunned down by Mayo's distraught father at the trial of the suspect accused in Mayo's death. Costas's final words to Sipowicz, "Take care of the baby", led to his initial withdrawal from the squad. Yet, his keen perceptiveness allows him to gain a confession from the suspect in Mayo's death, who had tried to buy his way out of trouble. Furthermore, Sipowicz reaches a level of understanding with PAA John Irvin (portrayed by Bill Brochtrup), whose homosexuality had been a stumbling block for Sipowicz in their interactions to that point.

The next two seasons had the continuation of Sipowicz's relationship with Sorenson (in whom Sipowicz sees a resemblance to his late son), along with more changes in the squad. Departing during this time were Kirkendall (due to her unknowing involvement in her ex-husband's dirty dealings), Martinez (following his promotion to uniformed sergeant), Fancy as squad leader (following his promotion to captain), and Russell (for a leave of absence to grieve the loss of Simone). Arriving to replace them are Det. Baldwin Jones (played by Henry Simmons), Det. Connie McDowell (played by Charlotte Ross), and Lt. Tony Rodriguez (played by Esai Morales). Also arriving in season eight was new full-time ADA Valerie Haywood (played by Garcelle Beauvais-Nilon).

At the end of season eight, Sorenson is approached by the owners of a strip club to work for them providing information. Still reeling from Russell's abruptly ending their brief affair, he accepts the offer. After reporting to Lt. Rodriguez, Sorenson goes undercover, but then goes missing, after a stripper he was seeing turns up dead in his apartment (though not by his doing). The Sorenson character was written out at the start of season nine, at Schroder's request; he wanted to spend more time with his family.

L–R, the cast of NYPD Blue at the beginning of season 11: Clapp, Gosselaar, Obradors, Beauvais-Nilon, Franz, Simmons, Ross, Brochtrup, Morales

=== Seasons 9–12 ===
Season nine initially tied in with the September 11 terrorist attacks. In the "Sorenson missing" storyline, continuing from the previous season, a suspect trades immunity for a robbery and shooting in exchange for information on a buried rug in Brooklyn that turns out to contain Sorenson's dead body.

Assisting on the investigation is Officer John Clark Jr., played by Mark-Paul Gosselaar. He is promoted to detective third grade for his heroic actions in the shootout that ended with the death of the hitman who had murdered Danny and an undercover federal agent; Sipowicz is promoted to detective first grade at the same time. Fancy had previously recommended Sipowicz for first grade at the same time as Simone for a high-profile case they both worked several years earlier; while Simone was promoted, the negative incidents in his past caused the department to deny Sipowicz's promotion.

The newly minted Det. Clark becomes Sipowicz's newest (and greenest) partner. As had occurred with Simone and Sorenson, initially tension exists between Clark and Sipowicz, largely due to an old feud from years earlier involving Sipowicz and Clark's father, John Clark Sr. (Joe Spano), an average, by-the-book detective from a low-crime precinct, who is enraged that his son chose to join the 15th Precinct to work with Andy. Season nine also has the introduction of Det. Rita Ortiz (played by Jacqueline Obradors). Two other actresses were first cast in roles as young, Latina detectives who were intended to be regular cast members; one was dropped in the prefilming process over creative differences, and Vanessa Marcil made an appearance as Det. Maria Olivera in the season-9 premiere, with the possibility of becoming a regular cast member. Producers were not convinced about Marcil, and made her character a one-time guest role, then continued casting until they hired Obradors. (Marcil did come back for another one-episode guest spot in season 11).

The remaining four years had a continuing focus on Sipowicz as the main character, as had been the case since Simone's death. Another unlikely romance developed between Sipowicz and Connie McDowell. This came about due to her ability to stand up to Sipowicz's gruffness, and her tender relationship with his son Theo (played by Austin Majors). They eventually married, and after adopting McDowell's sister's baby daughter (following the sister's murder by her husband, Connie's brother-in-law), had a child of their own. The McDowell character eventually became an off-screen character in the second half of the 11th season and throughout the final season due to issues between Ross and show executives.

Rodriguez was written out halfway through the 11th season, after his IAB enemy Capt. Pat Fraker shot and nearly killed him in a drunken rage, then was acquitted; the acquittal, combined with him not making the captain's promotion list, caused him to retire and take a lucrative job in private security. Sgt. Eddie Gibson, played by former NYPD officer John F. O'Donohue, replaced Lt. Rodriguez as squad commander. Gibson had previously served in the squad both on night watch and briefly on the "day tour". Haywood, after failing to convict Fraker for Rodriguez's shooting, appeared in fewer episodes and then left at the end of the 11th season. Kelly Ronson, played by Jessalyn Gilsig, replaced McDowell, and appeared in a handful of episodes in the closing stretch of season 11. Ronson was never a main-credits character and did not return in season 12. Lt. Thomas Bale, played by Currie Graham, replaced Gibson at the start of season 12. Det. Laura Murphy, played by Bonnie Somerville, replaced Ronson.

In the final few episodes, the storylines revolved around the impending retirement of Det. Medavoy and Sipowicz's promotion to sergeant and later assumption of command of the 15th Detective Squad. The series finale introduced two new young detectives named Quinn and Slovak, who echoed the first days of Irish-American Kelly and Polish-American Sipowicz.

== Controversy ==
The series included more nudity and raw language than was common on broadcast television, which resulted in at least 30 of the network's affiliates—mostly in smaller and conservative markets and mainly in the South—not running the series when it debuted, with the show airing in many of those markets on a Fox affiliate or independent station live or delayed. 29 of the affiliates eventually had the show's ratings overrule their moral objections and began to air it by the time the third season started. WLOX in Biloxi, Mississippi, was the only ABC affiliate that never aired any episodes of the series, choosing to pre-empt it with double-run syndicated sitcoms and leaving Fox affiliate WXXV-TV to run it, instead.

In 2005, L. Brent Bozell III told Time magazine that the nudity on the series influenced him to establish the Parents Television Council, for which he served as president from 1995 to 2006. The PTC has directly criticized several episodes of the show for perceived vulgarity and filed complaints with the Federal Communications Commission (FCC) over the use of obscene language in several episodes aired in early 2003, at the last half of the 10th season of the show, associating the series with a perceived increase in profanity and violence on prime-time television from the late 1990s to early 2000s. The FCC ruled that the language in the episodes was indecent, but decided not to fine ABC, because the episodes aired before a 2004 ruling that obscenities would lead to an automatic fine. However, on January 25, 2008, the FCC fined ABC $1.4 million for the episode "Nude Awakening" (airdate February 25, 2003), due to scenes of "adult sexual nudity". The fine was ultimately rejected by the United States Court of Appeals for the Second Circuit on January 6, 2011.

According to NYPD Blue: A Final Tribute, a retrospective broadcast that aired the same night as the last episode, the controversy was not limited to what was on the screen. David Milch, the show's co-creator and head writer, was a controversial figure on the set during the seven years he was with the show. His working style and tendency to procrastinate or make last-minute, on-set changes contributed to a frustrating working environment for some of the cast and crew. Smits left the show when his contract ended because of it, as did Andrea Thompson. Milch cites his own alcoholism and other addictions as factors contributing to the difficult environment. His personal problems and "exhaustion" over the lengthy production of the episodes caused him to leave the series after the seventh season. In spite of the controversy, Milch is usually credited as a major creative force during the years he worked on the show; he won two Emmy Awards for his writing, shared another as executive producer, and shared in a further 10 nominations for his writing and production.

== Awards and nominations ==
NYPD Blue has won 84 out of 285 award nominations. The series has garnered 84 Primetime Emmy Award nominations, winning 20 of them. Of the 20 wins, the series won the award for Outstanding Drama Series; Dennis Franz won four times for Outstanding Lead Actor in a Drama Series; Kim Delaney won for Outstanding Supporting Actress in a Drama Series; Gordon Clapp won for Outstanding Supporting Actor in a Drama Series; Shirley Knight and Debra Monk each won for Outstanding Guest Actress in a Drama Series and Paris Barclay won twice for Outstanding Directing for a Drama Series. It has received thirteen Golden Globe Award nominations, with David Caruso, Franz and Jimmy Smits each winning for Best Actor – Television Series Drama and the series winning Best Television Series – Drama. The series received 23 Screen Actors Guild Award nominations, with Franz winning twice for Outstanding Performance by a Male Actor in a Drama Series and the cast winning for Outstanding Performance by an Ensemble in a Drama Series. NYPD Blue received 13 TCA Award nominations, winning once for Outstanding Achievement in Drama. Additional accolades include two Peabody Awards, the Producers Guild of America Award for Best Episodic Drama, the Writers Guild of America Award for Television: Episodic Drama, and the Satellite Award for Best Television Series – Drama.

== Episodes ==
Season	Episodes	Originally released		Rank	Rating (seasons 1–4)/ Viewers (in millions) (seasons 5–12)
Season	Episodes	First released	Last released	Rank	Rating (seasons 1–4)/ Viewers (in millions) (seasons 5–12)
1	22	September 21, 1993	May 17, 1994	18	13.9 (Note: Tied with Wings)
2	22	October 11, 1994	May 23, 1995	7	16.5
3	22	October 24, 1995	May 21, 1996	10	14.1
4	22	October 15, 1996	May 20, 1997	13	12.5
5	22	September 30, 1997	May 19, 1998	19	15.0
6	22	October 20, 1998	May 25, 1999	12	14.4
7	22	January 11, 2000	May 23, 2000	17	15.6
8	20	January 9, 2001	May 22, 2001	23	16.2
9	23	November 6, 2001	May 21, 2002	31	12.3
10	22	September 24, 2002	May 20, 2003	34	11.3
11	22	September 23, 2003	May 11, 2004	51	9.9
12	20	September 21, 2004	March 1, 2005	42	10.1

== Critical reception ==
NYPD Blue has generally received rave reviews from leading television critics. Variety even went as far as to say that broadcast television had lost its edge after NYPD Blue was cancelled. In 2013, TV Guide placed the series at number 44 on its list of the 60 best television shows of all time, and Complex ranked it as the eighth best television drama of all time.

=== Average seasonal ratings ===
Season	Episodes	Timeslot (EDT)	Season premiere	Season finale	TV season	Rank	Nielsen rating (Households, seasons 1–6; Viewers (in millions), seasons 7–12)
1	22	Tuesday 10:00pm	September 21, 1993	May 17, 1994	1993–94	#18	13.0
2	22	Tuesday 10:00pm	October 11, 1994	May 23, 1995	1994–95	#7	15.7
3	22	Tuesday 10:00pm	October 11, 1995	May 21, 1996	1995–96	#10	13.5
4	22	Tuesday 10:00pm	September 15, 1996	May 20, 1997	1996–97	#13	12.1
5	22	Tuesday 10:00pm	September 3, 1997	May 19, 1998	1997–98	#17	10.5
6	22	Tuesday 10:00pm	October 20, 1998	May 25, 1999	1998–99	#12	10.4
7	22	Tuesday 10:00pm	January 11, 2000	May 23, 2000	1999–2000	#17	15.5
8	20	Tuesday 10:00pm	January 9, 2001	May 22, 2001	2000–01	#23	16.2
9	22	Tuesday 9:00pm	November 6, 2001	May 21, 2002	2001–02	#31	12.3
10	22	Tuesday 10:00pm	September 24, 2002	May 20, 2003	2002–03	#34	11.3
11	22	Tuesday 10:00pm	September 23, 2003	May 11, 2004	2003–04	#51	9.9
12	20	Tuesday 10:00pm	September 20, 2004	March 1, 2005	2004–05	#42	10.1

== Home media ==
20th Century Fox Home Entertainment released the first four seasons of NYPD Blue on DVD in Regions 1, 2, and 4. All of the sets contain the original master recordings, the original ABC broadcasts, and custom-made credits. After the release of the fourth season in 2006, Fox announced that they would be reviewing the possibility of further releases, citing the lack of sales.

On October 3, 2013, it was announced that Shout! Factory had acquired the rights to the series in Region 1. They have subsequently released seasons five to 12 on DVD.

In Region 2, Mediumrare acquired the rights to release the remaining eight seasons of the show on DVD in the United Kingdom.

Seasons 1–12 are available on Hulu, the American subscription video on demand service. However, the first six seasons are remastered in HD and cropped from 4:3 to 16:9, in similar fashion to The Simpsons and Buffy the Vampire Slayer. All 12 seasons are also available on Amazon Prime in their original formats (as of August 2023).

In Australia and New Zealand, all twelve seasons are streaming on Disney+ in 16:9. The same cropping is present for the UK and Ireland.

DVD Name	Ep #	DVD Release dates			Extra features
DVD Name	Ep #	Region 1	Region 2 (UK)	Region 4	Extra features
The Complete 1st Season	22	March 18, 2003	May 19, 2003	June 17, 2003	Audio commentary on one episode on each disc; "The Making Of Season 1" featurette; "Love On NYPD Blue" featurette; "Cast Blotter" featurette; Script-to-screen comparison; Cast/Crew Biographies
The Complete 2nd Season	22	August 19, 2003	October 6, 2003	February 17, 2004	Audio Commentaries; "Season Two: A Season of Change" featurette; "Wedding Bell Blues" featurette; "The Music of Mike Post" featurette; Script-to-screen comparisons: "Sipowicz Meets Simone", "Sylvia Meets Simone", and "Simone and Sipowicz Bond"
The Complete 3rd Season	22	February 21, 2006	April 17, 2006	May 29, 2006	Audio commentary on three episodes; Season-three overview; "The 15th Precinct" featurette; "Fathers and Sons" featurette; "Women of NYPD Blue" featurette
The Complete 4th Season	22	June 20, 2006	August 14, 2006	August 21, 2006	Audio commentaries; "Through the Lens: The Look of Blue" featurette; "In With the New" featurette
The Complete 5th Season	22	January 21, 2014	December 10, 2012	N/A	This DVD set is the only licensed release of the full 90-minute version of the episode "Lost Israel, Part 2," which is cut to 60 minutes in syndication and streaming.
The Complete 6th Season	22	June 24, 2014	December 10, 2012	N/A	This DVD set is the only licensed release of the full 90-minute version of the episode "Hearts and Souls" which is cut to 60 minutes in syndication and streaming.
The Complete 7th Season	22	September 30, 2014	February 25, 2013	N/A	
The Complete 8th Season	20	January 13, 2015	February 25, 2013	N/A	
The Complete 9th Season	23	April 5, 2016	March 25, 2013	N/A	
The Complete 10th Season	22	August 23, 2016	April 1, 2013	N/A	
The Complete 11th Season	22	November 15, 2016	April 29, 2013	N/A	
The Complete 12th Season	20	January 17, 2017	April 29, 2013	N/A	

== Legacy ==
TV reviewer and author Alan Sepinwall informally began his career by blogging recaps and analyses of NYPD Blue episodes.

== Sequel ==
The sequel of the series was announced in October 2018. The pilot is a co-production between 20th Century Fox TV, which was behind the original series, and ABC Studios, and producers were casting its four main roles at the time of the announcement. The storyline would revolve around the murder of Andy Sipowicz, with his son Theo as a uniformed police officer who works to earn promotion to detective while investigating his father's killing.

On May 10, 2019, it was reported that the sequel's pilot would be retooled for a potential midseason pickup. On January 30, 2020, it was reported that the sequel was no longer in active development at ABC.
