= Currie Graham =

Canadian stage, film and television actor

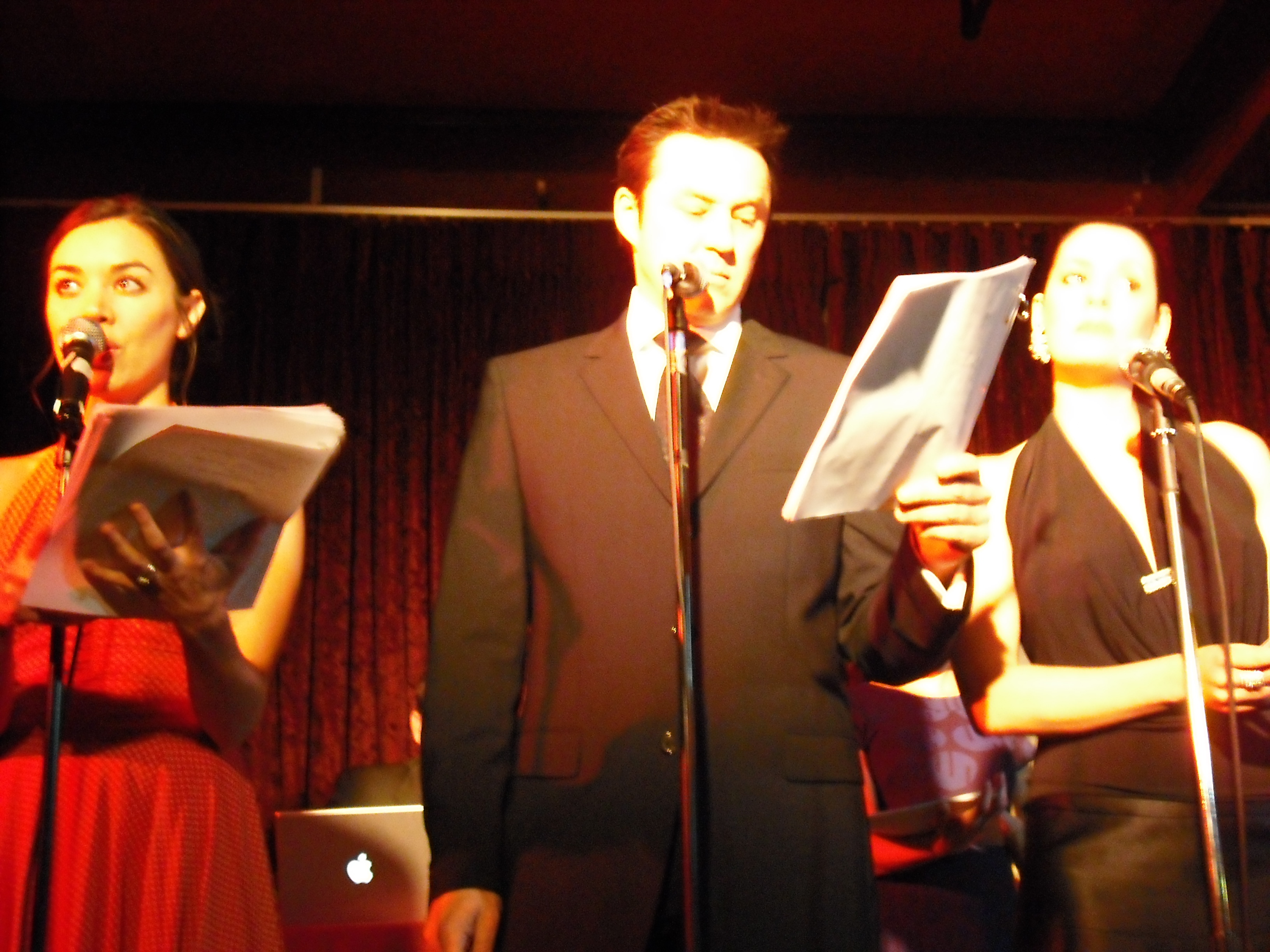
- Graham at The Thrilling Adventure and Supernatural Suspense Hour in 2009
- Born: February 26, 1967 (age 59); Hamilton, Ontario, Canada
- Occupation: Actor
- Years active: 1988—present
- Children: 1

Currie Graham (born February 26, 1967) is a Canadian stage, film and television actor. While primarily recognized as a TV actor, he has numerous film credits, including the action thrillers Rancid and Assault on Precinct 13.

== Early life ==
Graham grew up in Ontario, Canada. Currie is his mother's maiden name. He attended Algonquin Public School and Maynard Public School. His family relocated from Algonquin, Ontario to Cardinal, Ontario. He attended South Grenville District High School in Prescott, Ontario. He studied acting at the American Academy of Dramatic Arts in New York City.

== Film and TV work ==
Currie may be best known for playing Lt. Thomas Bale, the micromanaging detective squad commander in the final season of the TV program NYPD Blue, having earlier made an appearance in season 4 playing a small-time criminal. His other regular starring TV appearances include the final season of the TV program Suddenly Susan as the male lead/romantic interest Nate Knaborski.

Graham has established a career in television via multiple guest-starring roles, including recurring roles in House as the husband of Dr. House's ex-girlfriend Stacy (Sela Ward), The Mentalist as Walter Mashburn, Weeds as Vince, 24 as Ted Cofell, Boston Legal as ADA Frank Ginsberg, Desperate Housewives as Lynette Scavo's boss, Ed Ferrara, Criminal Minds as Viper, in the episode titled "52 Pickup" and in Men in Trees as Supervisor Richard Ellis, the romantic interest of local chief of police Celia Bachelor. Other guest appearances include Over There (Season 1, Episode 10) as Corporal Shaver, and roles on the TV programs Judging Amy, Patrick Lehane on the TV mini-series Would Be Kings and CSI. Graham also appeared in one episode of ER.

At the 19th Gemini Awards in 2004, Graham received a nomination for Best Performance by an Actor in a Featured Supporting Role for his portrayal of Constable Robert Cross in the 2003 TV film Cowboys and Indians: The J.J. Harper Story.

In 2008, he appeared as IOA agent James Marrick in the direct-to-DVD film Stargate: The Ark of Truth, a film conclusion of the Stargate SG-1 television franchise. He previously starred as Nick Balco in the TNT series Raising the Bar. Previously, he has appeared in the pilot episode of Brimstone as Det. William Kane, in the Season 4 premiere of Private Practice alongside French Stewart, and had a recurring role in Dallas.

Currie has appeared in a handful of films. His credits include minor roles in Hitchcock (2012) and the 2012 remake of Total Recall, as well as a supporting role in Pompeii (2014).

In 2015, he appeared as Mike Sherman in an episode of Mad Men. In 2016, he appeared as Calvin Chadwick in season two of Agent Carter. In 2016, he joined the cast of the HBO series Westworld. He also appeared in USS Indianapolis: Men of Courage as the prosecutor in Captain McVay's court martial. In 2018, he had a recurring role as Ben McRee, a longtime friend of the titular character in The Rookie. In 2022 he had a recurring role in the Amazon Prime Video series Reacher as the villain Kliner Sr.

== Filmography ==
=== Films ===
Year	Title	Role	Notes
1993	Money for Nothing	Dunleavy	
1994	Amateur	Video store clerk	
1994	Trust in Me	Dylan Gray	
1996	Portraits of a Killer	Wade Simms	
1997	One of Our Own	Detective Peter La Pierre	
1999	The Arrangement	Detective Peter La Pierre	
1999	Black Light	Larry Avery	
2002	Edge of Madness	Dr. Jenkins	
2002	Hip, Edgy, Sexy, Cool		
2002	Angels Crest	Richard	
2004	Rancid	Crispin Klein	
2005	Assault on Precinct 13	Mike Kahane	
2008	Stargate: The Ark of Truth	IOA agent James Marrick	
2010	Henry's Crime	Simon	
2012	Hitchcock	PR flack	
2014	Cabin Fever: Patient Zero	Dr. Edwards	
2014	Kiss Me	Dr. Craig	
2014	Pompeii	Bellator	
2016	Havenhurst	Mike	
2016	USS Indianapolis: Men of Courage	Captain Ryan	
2017	Blackmail	Bollinger	
2018	My Million Dollar Mom	Governor Ritter	Short film
2021	Born a Champion	Burchman	
2024	Homestead	Blake Masterson	

=== Television ===
Year	Title	Role	Notes
1992	Law & Order	Mitchell Burkitt	Episode: "Star Struck"
2022	Law & Order	Kyle Swanson	Episode: "Wicked Game"
1993	Survive the Night	Ice	Television film
1994	Hostage for a Day	Hondo	Television film
1994	Lonesome Dove: The Series	Deserter	Episode: "Duty Bound"
1995	Falling for You	Detective Colton	Television film
1996	A Stranger to Love	Jimmy	Television film
1997	ER	James	Episode: "The Long Way Around"
1997	The Big Easy	Ted Rogers	Episode: "Son O' McSwain"
1998	Pacific Blue	Chad Brancato	Episode: "House Party"
1998	Players	Roy "Jericho" Hallicky	Episode: "Con-tamination"
1998	Brimstone	Detective William Kane	Episode: "Altar Boys"
1998	L.A. Doctors	Jay Johnson	Episode: "Classic Evan"
1999–2000	Suddenly Susan	Nate Knaborski	22 episodes
1999	Behind the Mask	Geller	Television film
1999	The Wonder Cabinet	Dr. Kevin Spitz	Television film
1999	Strange World	Malcolm Baine	Episode: "Aerobe"
2001	Philly	Hank Tyler	Episode: "Tempus Fugitive"
2001	CSI	Stanley Hunter	Episode: "Caged"
2002	Judging Amy	Mr. Simmons	Episode: "Boston Terriers from France"
2002	24	Ted Cofell	2 episodes
2002	The Division	Peter Sarkin	Episode: "Welcome Home"
2002	Witchblade	Carl Dalack	Episode: "Nailed"
2002	Body & Soul	Dr. Quinten Bremmer	Main cast
2003	Peacemakers	Linus Turrow	Episode: "Bad Company"
2003	Cowboys and Indians: The J.J. Harper Story	Constable Robert Cross	Television film
2003	The Handler	George	Episode: "Hardcore"
2003	These Guys	Tom	Television film
2003	111 Gramercy Park	Ken Wilton	Television film
2004	Threat Matrix	Agent Daley	Episode: "Extremist Makeover"
2004	Monk	Harold Maloney	Episode: "Mr. Monk and the Missing Granny"
2004	CSI: Miami	Robert Mackenzie	Episode: "Money for Nothing"
2004	The Practice	Sheldon Modry	Episode: "The Firm"
2004	The Drew Carey Show	Russell	Episode: "Straight Eye for the Queer Guy"
2004–2005	NYPD Blue	Lieutenant Thomas Bale	Main role (season 12)
2005–2006	House	Mark Warner	4 episodes
2005	Over There	Corporal Shaver	Episode: "Suicide Rain"
2005–2008	Boston Legal	ADA Frank Ginsberg	9 episodes
2005–2007	Desperate Housewives	Ed Ferrara	9 episodes
2006	Augusta, Gone	John	Television film
2006	CSI	Willy Cutler	2 episodes
2006	The Accidental Witness	Victor Sandeman	Television film
2006	A.K.A.	Captain Mayhew	Television film
2007	By Appointment Only	Jake Brenner	Television film
2007	Elijah	Gary Filmon	Television film
2007–2008	Men in Trees	Supervisor Richard Ellis	10 episodes
2008	Criminal Minds	Viper	Episode: "52 Pickup"
2008	Would Be Kings	Patrick Lehane	Television miniseries (2 episodes)
2008	The Capture of the Green River Killer	Captain Norwell	Television film
2008–2009	Raising the Bar	Nick Balco	25 episodes
2009	Ghost Whisperer	Rick Hartman	Episode: "Thrilled to Death"
2009	Lie to Me	Eric Kuransky	Episode: "Undercover"
2010	Castle	Stanford Raynes	Episode: "Wrapped Up in Death"
2010	The Mentalist	Walter Mashburn	2 episodes
2010	The Closer	Paul Ryder	Episode: "The Big Bang"
2010	Weeds	Vince	Episode: "A Yippity Sippity"
2010	Dark Blue	Jack Sutton	Episode: "Home Sweet Home"
2010	Private Practice	Ryan Mason	Episode: "Take Two"
2010	Smoke Screen	Raley Gannon	Television film
2011	Fairly Legal	John Marsden	Episode: "Believers"
2011	Chaos	Congressman Fuller	Episode: "Song of the North"
2011	Law & Order: LA	Max Hearn	2 episodes
2011	Suits	Judge Donald Pearl	Episode: "Errors and Omissions"
2011	Grimm	Frank Rabe	Episode: "Bears Will Be Bears"
2012	Fringe	Jim Mallum	Episode: "Forced Perspective"
2012	NCIS: Los Angeles	Agent Roger Clarke	Episode: "Partners"
2012	Harry's Law	Detective Lance Johnson	Episode: "The Whole Truth"
2012	The Exes	Brett	Episode: "Three Men and a Maybe"
2012	Drop Dead Diva	Simon Grundy	Episode: "Lady Parts"
2012	Arrow	Derek Reston / King	Episode: "Legacies"
2012–16	House of Lies	Grant Stevens	5 episodes
2013	The Glades	Pruitt Wolcott	Episode: "Shot Girls"
2013	Franklin & Bash	ADA Kirk	Episode: "Freck"
2013	Grey's Anatomy	Greg	Episode: "Sorry Seems to Be the Hardest Word"
2014	Dallas	Stanley "Stan" Babcock	3 episodes
2014–2016	Murder in the First	Mario Siletti	32 episodes
2014	Saving Hope	Dr. Thor MacLeod	Episode: "Days of Heaven"
2015–2017	Longmire	Kevin Morris	3 episodes
2015	Mad Men	Mike Sherman	Episode: "The Milk and Honey Route"
2016	Agent Carter	Calvin Chadwick	7 episodes
2016–2018	Westworld	Craig	Episode: "The Original"; Episode: "The Riddle of the Sphinx"
2016	Noches con Platanito	Himself	1 episode
2017	Chicago P.D.	Todd Smith	Episode: "Home"
2017	Ten Days in the Valley	Henry Vega	5 episodes
2018	Kevin (Probably) Saves the World	Glenn Peyton (voice); Barry	Episode: "Caught White-Handed"; Episode: "The Right Thing"
2018–2021	The Rookie	Ben McRee	7 episodes
2018	The Detectives	Detectives Sergeant Greg Brown	Episode: "The Walk Home"
2019	Blue Bloods	Liam Norris	Episode: "Ripple Effect"
2019	Project Blue Book	Susie's associate	5 episodes
2019	Titans	Stuart	Episode: "Faux Hawk"
2020	Emergence	Government agent	2 episodes
2020	Cardinal	Neil Cuthbert	4 episodes
2022	Reacher	Kliner Sr.	4 episodes
2023	1923	Chadwick Benton	2 episodes
2024–present	Homestead: The Series	Blake Masterson	Recurring character (season 1)
2026	Star Trek: Strange New Worlds	Turr	Episode: "Orders of Magnitude"
2026	Bass X Machina	Rivenbark (voice)	Upcoming series

=== Web ===
Year	Title	Role	Notes
2012	House of Lies: Fridays at Galweather	Grant Stevens	Episode: "Sexual Harassment"
2015	Con Man	Emcee	Episode: "Baby Boom"
