= Greg Medavoy =

- NYPD Blue character
- First appearance: “Brown Appetit” (1x03)
- Last appearance: “Moving Day” (12x20)
- Portrayed by: Gordon Clapp

In-universe information
- Spouse: Marie Medavoy (ex-wife)
- Children: Katie Medavoy (daughter)
- Partners: James Martinez; Baldwin Jones

Gregory Andrew Medavoy is a fictional character (as well as a protagonist) in the television series NYPD Blue. He was played by Gordon Clapp from the third episode of the 1st season to the last episode of the series. Aside from Andy Sipowicz, he was the longest running regular character in the series.

== Biography ==
Medavoy was born in late 1953 or early 1954 and grew up in suburban Long Island. He originally planned to be an English teacher, but due to a school hiring freeze instead followed the example of relatives and joined the NYPD in 1976, the same year he married his wife Marie.

Frequently on the receiving end of jokes about his bumbling speech, occasional stutter, and mannerisms, Medavoy often provided comic relief. He was sometimes dismissed for a lack of street toughness compared to his more blue-collar colleagues who were raised in the city. Despite his faults, he was actually a skilled detective who earned respect through his tenacity and inventiveness; he had a knack for talking people into doing things they were initially reluctant to do, including coming to the police station to be questioned, or confessing to a crime. Where many of his peers relied on intimidation and aggression, Medavoy more frequently used the appearance of sympathy to lull suspects into a false sense of security. In undercover assignments, he especially excelled at playing dimwitted 'suckers' to whom suspects could feel superior. This skill earned him a commendation when Medavoy went into a 15th Precinct holding cell undercover and tricked a conman into confessing by pretending to be interested in learning how to execute the con himself. Medavoy was also a skillful improviser; he was commended for bluffing a murder suspect by matching the suspect's rapid fire lies with lies of his own that were so fast and skillful that the suspect believed he had been seen committing the crime, which prompted him to confess. During the series, Medavoy was promoted to Detective Second Grade.

The other cops, chiefly Sipowicz, sometimes treated him with contempt due to his tendency to drone on about arcane subjects and his general eagerness to be liked. He was also sidetracked occasionally by thoughts of money-making opportunities based on people he met in his police work, including dog breeders, and a conman who sold a book claiming it was possible to legally avoid paying federal income taxes. His partners James Martinez and Baldwin Jones were usually able to get him to focus again with "Let's go, Greg!" or "Come on, Greg!". He was also sometimes the subject of practical jokes, including one where Sipowicz caused him to think free Chinese food he had received from a grateful crime victim whose case he worked on was the subject of an Internal Affairs Bureau investigation, which prompted Medavoy to climb into a dumpster and recover the containers so he could dispose of the "evidence" where Internal Affairs detectives would not find it.

Initially, he was unhappily married to a nagging woman named Marie, whom he caught cheating on him. He had an affair with Donna Abandando, the squad's police administrative aide (PAA), and Medavoy's existing marriage made the relationship difficult. After the pressure became too much, Donna ended things with Greg, who tried unsuccessfully to return to his marriage. He was later attracted to coworker Abby Sullivan, who revealed that she was a lesbian, and that her partner Kathy and she were interested in having him father their child through artificial insemination. Greg agreed; while Abby was pregnant, Kathy was killed. Abby gave birth at the same time Martinez and his wife had their first child, and Greg was present when Abby's baby was born.

In Season 7, Martinez was promoted, and Greg was then partnered with Baldwin Jones, a young detective who had worked in the Bias Crimes unit. Though they were polar opposites in appearance and demeanor, the two soon grew a friendship that was tested by Greg's neuroses and the younger Baldwin's irritation over them, but Baldwin's calm demeanor and occasional bemusement enabled him to cope. Greg's trust in Baldwin became clear when they fired their guns at an armed suspect but killed a bystander just around the corner, and the fatal shot was determined to have come from Baldwin's gun. Despite not having actually seen the shooter's gun, Greg backed his partner up when questioned, telling Baldwin he knew him well enough to know that if Baldwin said there was a gun, there was. Greg's reputation continued to improve within the squad when he assisted Sipowicz and McDowell in their custody hearings; when the parents of Frank Colahan, the father of Connie's sister's baby, attempted to gain custody, Medavoy discovered their past child abuse, which caused them to withdraw their request. His extensive research into ADA Valerie Heywood's attack solved the case by linking the attacker to her disgruntled stalker.

Medavoy also overcame a witch hunt by Lt. Bale, who turned him in to Internal Affairs and tried to wreck his career after learning he was employed part-time at a bar, though it was against regulations for off-duty police officers to work at establishments that serve alcohol. After a hearing in which he was ordered to forfeit five days' pay, Medavoy returned to work and upbraided Bale for his autocratic ways, calling him a bully and a coward for not handling the matter face to face. Medavoy carried himself with a noticeable increase in confidence afterwards.

In the final few episodes, Medavoy retired in order to join the real estate business; the interpersonal skills he had developed as a detective enabled him to close a sale for his new girlfriend Bridgid, whom he had met on a fraud case, and she invited him to come to work with her. At his retirement party, Medavoy expressed his love for his career and coworkers, and closed with the traditional NYPD toast "to the guy that invented this job". In the final episode of the series, Medavoy stopped by the 15th Precinct during a sales call while his former colleagues came and went amid demands of their investigations. This led Medavoy to observe out loud to himself, "Boy, when you're gone, you're gone".

== Sources ==
=== Internet ===
- Alan, Sepinwall. "Character Biography, Detective Greg Medavoy". NYPD Blue Online. Alan Sepinwall. Archived from the original on June 14, 1997.
- Sepinwall, Alan. "Summary, NYPD Blue, Season 2, Episode 12, "Large Mouth Bass"". NYPD Blue Online. Alan Sepinwall. Archived from the original on March 4, 2005.
- Wilson, Amanda (February 8, 2000). "NYPD Blue: Summary/Review, "These Shoots Are Made for Joaquin"". NYPD Blue Online. Alan Sepinwall. Archived from the original on February 29, 2000.
- Wilson, Amanda (February 22, 2000). "NYPD Blue: Summary/Review, "Along Came Jones"". NYPD Blue Online. Alan Sepinwall. Archived from the original on April 7, 2000.
- Wilson, Amanda (December 1, 2004). "NYPD Blue Summary/Review, "I Love My Wives, But Oh, You Kid"". NYPD Blue Online. Alan Sepinwall. Archived from the original on December 29, 2004.
- Wilson, Amanda (November 16, 2004). "NYPD Blue Summary/Review, "My Dinner with Andy"". NYPD Blue Online. Alan Sepinwall. Archived from the original on December 12, 2004.
- Wilson, Amanda (November 30, 2004). "NYPD Blue Summary/Review, "The 3-H Club"". NYPD Blur Online. Alan Sepinwall. Archived from the original on February 9, 2005.
- Wilson, Amanda (February 22, 2005). "NYPD Blue Summary/Review, "Bale to the Chief"". NYPD Blue Online. Alan Sepinwall. Archived from the original on February 25, 2005.
- Wilson, Amanda; Sepinwall, Alan (March 1, 2005). "NYPD Blue Summary/Review, "Moving Day"". NYPD Blue Online. Alan Sepinwall. Archived from the original on March 4, 2005.
- Warn, Sarah (June 22, 2006). "Lesbian Characters Get Promoted on Fourth Season of NYPD Blue". After Ellen.com. Los Angeles, CA: Totallyher Media, LLC. p. 3.
- Wilson, Amanda (January 12, 1998). "Review, "Show And Tell"". NYPD Blue Online. Alan Sepinwall. Archived from the original on August 24, 2000.
- Broaddus, Maurice (June 6, 2005). "Synopsis, Season 12". NYPD Blue at (2005) Television Review. Hollywood Jesus.
- Jicha, Tom (October 24, 1995). "NYPD New: Cop Drama Steps Up With Late Season Premiere". Broward County Sun-Sentinel. Fort Lauderdale, FL. Archived from the original on February 2, 2017.
- "FAQ: What was Greg doing in the mirror in "Seminal Thinking"?". NYPD Blue Online. Alan Speinwall. Archived from the original on July 28, 2005.
- Wilson, Amanda (November 28, 2003). "Review, "Only Schumcks Pay Income Taxes"". NYPD Blue Online. Alan Sepinwall. Archived from the original on April 13, 2004.
- Kendall, G. (June 7, 2016). "Review, NYPD Blue Season Five, The Cast & Guest Stars". The Milch Studies. Gentlemen of Leisure.

=== Books ===
- Ellis, John (2007). TV FAQ: Uncommon Answers to Common Questions About TV. New York, NY: I. B. Tauris. p. 102. ISBN 978-1-84511-565-4.
