= James Martinez (NYPD Blue) =

- NYPD Blue character
- First appearance: “Pilot” (1x01)
- Last appearance: "Brothers Under Arms" (7x06)
- Portrayed by: Nicholas Turturro
- Spouse: Gina Colon Martinez
- Children: James Martinez, Jr.

James Martinez was a fictional character in the television series NYPD Blue. He was played by Nicholas Turturro from Seasons 1 to 7.

== Biography ==
Martinez was originally assigned to the 15th Precinct detective squad as a temporary replacement for Andy Sipowicz after Sipowicz was shot. Though inexperienced, he demonstrated enthusiasm for the job and a willingness to learn, especially from John Kelly, whom he idolized. He proved a quick study, and his competence and upbeat approach to his job enabled him to earn a permanent assignment as a detective. He went on to work primarily as the partner of Greg Medavoy. His family life was not always stable; he witnessed the death of his drug addict brother to a drug overdose, for which Martinez's father blamed Martinez.

Martinez pursued fellow Detective Adrienne Lesniak, who sought to avoid his romantic interests by falsely claiming to be a lesbian. They eventually did begin to date, but Lesniak's constant suspicions and criticism caused James to end their relationship. In season three, Martinez was shot in the side, bullet fragments lodged near his spine, while responding to a call with Medavoy; though doctors initially feared he would be paralyzed, Martinez recovered and returned to work.

Martinez later began a tentative courtship with Gina Colon, a new administrative assistant assigned to the 15th Precinct. After Gina was beaten and her face was slashed, Martinez aided in her recovery, and their relationship blossomed. She became pregnant, but initially rebuffed Martinez's proposals because she did not want him to feel trapped or obligated. He eventually convinced her of his sincerity, and they got married shortly before the birth of their son, James Martinez Jr.

In Season 7, Martinez left the 15th Precinct after passing the examination for promotion and receiving a new assignment as a uniformed sergeant.

== Sources ==
=== Internet ===
- Sepinwall, Alan. "Biographies: James Martinez, Nicholas Turturro". NYPD Blue Online. Archived from the original on November 30, 2016.
- Sepinwall, Alan. "Biographies: Adrienne Lesniak, Justine Miceli". NYPD Blue Online 2. Archived from the original on April 12, 2016.
- Sepinwall, Alan. "Plot Summary: NYPD Blue, Season 4, Episode 11, Alice Doesn't Fit Here Anymore". NYPD Blue Online 3. Archived from the original on June 14, 1997.
- Kendall, G. (June 7, 2016). "NYPD Blue Season Five, The Cast & Guest Stars". The Milch Studies. Gentlemen of Leisure.

=== Newspapers ===
- Huff, Richard (February 15, 2000). "A 'Blue' Sendoff for Nick Turturro". New York Daily News. New York, NY. Archived from the original on September 25, 2016.
- Shales, Tom (September 30, 1997). "On ABC, True 'Blue'". Washington Post. Washington, DC.
- "'NYPD Blue' fans to welcome precinct newcomer Simmons". Lubbock Avalanche-Journal. Lubbock, TX. Knight Ridder. February 22, 2000.
