= Sylvia Costas =

Silvia Costas Sipowicz
- NYPD Blue character
- First appearance: “Pilot” (1x01)
- Last appearance: "Voir Dire This" (6x21)
- Portrayed by: Sharon Lawrence

In-universe information
- Gender: Female
- Occupation: Assistant District Attorney
- Spouse: Andy Sipowicz (husband)
- Children: Theo Sipowicz (son)

Sylvia Costas-Sipowicz is a fictional character from the American television drama NYPD Blue, in which the character was married to Detective Andy Sipowicz, played by Dennis Franz. She was played by Sharon Lawrence.

== Storylines ==
The character of Sylvia Costas is an Assistant District Attorney. She begins a relationship with the older and tough Detective Andy Sipowicz, played by Dennis Franz; Costas sees the decent, caring human being underneath Sipowicz's gruff exterior and falls in love with him. She is very supportive of his attempts to stay sober, a determination likely related to the fact that many of her known family members appear to be alcoholics. Meeting Sylvia's Greek family causes Sipowicz to fall off the wagon, sparking a period of strain in their relationship.

Sylvia is confident on the job, and is known to wield an acid tongue when cops' procedural errors blow her cases. The character was raped while in law school. When she is mugged, after she and Andy start dating, it brings back the emotions she didn't deal with when raped. After sensing that something more than the mugging is upsetting her, Andy makes her tell him what's wrong. This makes both Sylvia and Andy especially sensitive about rape cases.

After they become engaged, Andy expresses a desire to get married quickly in a Maryland civil service, while Sylvia wants a traditional Greek Orthodox wedding. Giving in to Sylvia's wishes, the two are married at the Saint Sophia Greek Cathedral.

They have a son, Theo, but shortly after Theo's birth, Andy's first son from a previous marriage, Andy Jr., is killed, causing Andy to begin drinking again. Despite her sympathy for his loss, Sylvia puts her foot down, ordering Andy out of their home until he can acknowledge his problem.

Their devotion to each other is tested again in a storyline when Andy undergoes surgery for prostate cancer. She threatens to throw him out if he doesn't take the test for cancer, reasoning that "knowing isn't the worst thing." Andy confesses that his greatest fear is not to be with her and baby Theo, to which she quietly replies, "Then be with us," finally convincing him to take the test.

The character has a dramatic exit from the show. The character returns to her job after time off to raise her on-screen son, but she is killed by James Mayo in a courthouse shooting incident. Her final words to her on-screen husband Andy are "Take care of the baby."
