= Nicholas Turturro =

American actor (born 1962)

- Born: Nicholas Turturro Jr. January 29, 1962 (age 64); Brooklyn, New York City, U.S.
- Occupation: Actor
- Years active: 1989–present
- Relatives: John Turturro (brother); Aida Turturro (cousin); Richard Termini (cousin)
- Awards: See below

Nicholas Turturro Jr. (born January 29, 1962) is an American actor. He is known as one of the frequent collaborators of Spike Lee, and his roles as Detective James Martinez on NYPD Blue and Sergeant Anthony Renzulli on Blue Bloods. He was nominated twice for the Primetime Emmy Award for Outstanding Supporting Actor in a Drama Series for his work on NYPD Blue. He is also a Screen Actors Guild Award winner and an Independent Spirit Award nominee.

== Early life ==
Turturro was born in Brooklyn, New York. His mother, Katherine Florence (née Incerella), was born in the U.S. to Italian parents from Sicily, and was an amateur jazz singer who worked in a Navy yard during World War II. His father, Nicholas Turturro Sr., was a carpenter and shoemaker who emigrated from Giovinazzo, Apulia, at the age of six and later fought as a US Navy serviceman on D-Day. He is the younger brother of John Turturro and the cousin of Aida Turturro.

== Career ==
He received two Emmy Award nominations for playing James Martinez on the television series NYPD Blue. He was on the series for its first seven seasons. He was a guest ring announcer at WrestleMania XI for the main event of Shawn Michaels vs. Diesel. His list of credits include portraying Al Capone in an episode of George Lucas's The Young Indiana Jones Chronicles and playing the role of Brucie in The Longest Yard and Renaldo in I Now Pronounce You Chuck & Larry. In July 2009, Turturro began co-starring in the comedy web series Dusty Peacock on Crackle. He played Sgt. Anthony Renzulli on Blue Bloods from 2010 to 2016.

He is a frequent collaborator with Spike Lee, appearing in six of his films.

== Personal life ==
Turturro is an avid New York Yankees fan and is known for his passionate videos on social media supporting the team. He has been co-owner of Prince St. Pizza since 2022.

== Filmography ==
=== Film ===
Year	Title	Role	Notes
1989	Do the Right Thing	Policeman	
1990	Mo' Better Blues	Josh Flatbush	
1991	Men of Respect	Bingo	
1991	Jungle Fever	Vinny	
1991	Dead and Alive: The Race for Gus Farace	Danny D'Arcangelo	TV movie
1992	Mac	Tony Gloves	
1992	Malcolm X	Boston Cop	
1994	Men Lie	-	
1994	Federal Hill	Ralph	
1994	Cosmic Slop	Father Carlos	TV movie
1994	The Search for One-eye Jimmy	Junior	
1995	Falling from the Sky: Flight 174	Al Williams	TV movie
1995	In the Line of Duty: Hunt for Justice	Mike Garret	TV movie
1997	Shadow Conspiracy	Grasso	
1997	Excess Baggage	Stick	
1998	Witness to the Mob	Sammy "The Bull" Gravano	TV movie
1998	Mercenary II: Thick & Thin	Major Ray Domino	TV movie
2000	Hellraiser: Inferno	Det. Tony Nenonen	Video
2001	Recess: School's Out	Cop #1 (voice)	
2001	The Shipment	Eddie Colucci	
2002	Monday Night Mayhem	Chet Forte	TV movie
2002	Big Shot: Confessions of a Campus Bookie	Joe Jr.	TV movie
2002	The Biz	Anthony	
2003	Purgatory Flats	Johnny Ramos	
2004	The Hollow	Sheriff Duncan	TV movie
2004	The Hillside Strangler	Angelo Buono	
2005	The Longest Yard	Brucie	
2005	Three Wise Guys	Vincent	TV movie
2006	World Trade Center	Officer Colovito	
2006	Trapped!	Travis	TV movie
2007	McBride: Semper Fi	Officer Pierce	TV movie
2007	I Now Pronounce You Chuck & Larry	Renaldo Pinera	
2008	First Sunday	Officer D'Agostino	
2008	Remembering Phil	Phil Winters	
2008	Phantom Punch	Caesar Novak	
2009	Street Boss	Jimmy Calone	
2009	The Deported	Gianni de Carlo	
2010	Shoot the Hero!	Grant	
2010	Takers	Franco Dalia	
2011	Fancypants	Randy	
2011	Bucky Larson: Born to Be a Star	Antonio	
2011	Zookeeper	Manny	
2012	Nick the Doorman	Nick	TV movie
2012	TalhotBlond	Detective Moretti	TV movie
2012	Super Cyclone	Travis Verdon	Video
2012	Here Comes the Boom	Referee	
2015	Paul Blart: Mall Cop 2	Nick Panero	
2015	Subterranea	Remy	
2017	Justice League Dark	Boston Brand/Deadman (voice)	
2017	The Eyes	Charlie	
2017	A Chance in the World	Mike Silvia	
2018	Honor Up	Detective Kean	
2018	BlacKkKlansman	Walker	
2019	Las Vegas Vietnam: The Movie	The Governor	
2019	Dear Frank	Father Quinn	
2020	Angels Fallen	Newton	
2020	Shooting Heroin	Reverend John	
2020	Escape: Puzzle of Fear	Keith	
2021	The Penthouse	Detective Martinez	
2021	Overrun	Doc	
2021	Four Cousins and A Christmas	Tommy	
2021	Escape from Death Block 13	Renda	
2021	Pups Alone	Benny	
2023	Call Her King	Jerry Spencer	
2023	The Crusades	Coach Krieger	
2023	Murder Motel	Crystal Bobby	
2023	Leo	Anthony's Dad (voice)	
2023	Hopeless Romantic	Soprano	Short
2024	The Bouncer	Doctor Esposito	
2025	Highest 2 Lowest	Frankie da Lunatic	
2025	Vampire for Hire	Stacey	Short

=== Television ===
Year	Title	Role	Notes
1991	Another World	Bartender	Episode: "Episode #1.6982"
1992	Law & Order	Poletti	Episode: "Blood Is Thicker..."
1993	The Young Indiana Jones Chronicles	Big Al Brown	Episode: "Young Indiana Jones and the Mystery of the Blues"
1993	L.A. Law	Anthony	Episode: "Book of Renovation, Chapter 1"
1993–2000	NYPD Blue	Detective James Martinez	Main Cast: Season 1–7
1997	The Drew Carey Show	Detective James Martinez	Episode: "New York and Queens"
1998	Hercules	Meleager (voice)	Guest Cast: Season 1–2
2001	The District	Officer Robert Turner	Episode: "Thursday"
2002	Touched by an Angel	Rolando	Episode: "The Word"
2002	The Twilight Zone	Speed	Episode: "Chosen"
2003	Tremors	Frank	Recurring Cast
2003–04	Third Watch	Aloysius "Allie" Nardo	Recurring Cast: Season 5
2005	Sex, Love & Secrets	Detective	Episode: "Protection"
2006	Celebrity Fit Club	Himself/Cast Member	Main Cast: Season 4
2007	The King of Queens	Vince Dinelli	Episode: "Single Spaced"
2008	Just Jordan	Big G	Episode: "Boogie Toasties"
2008	Days of Our Lives	Officer Darrell	Episode: "Episode #1.10941 & #1.10943"
2008	CSI: Crime Scene Investigation	Goya	Episode: "Let It Bleed"
2009	Burn Notice	Tommy D'Antonio	Episode: "Fearless Leader"
2010–16	Blue Bloods	Sergeant Anthony Renzulli	Recurring Cast: Season 1–3, Guest: Season 4–6
2011	The Protector	-	Episode: "Beef"
2012	White Collar	Delancy	Episode: "Compromising Positions"
2014	Hit the Floor	-	Episode: "Winner Takes All"
2016	The Crossroads of History	Francesco del Giocondo	Episode: "Mona Lisa"
2016	The Night Of	Detective	Episode: "Subtle Beast"
2017	Doubt	Art Camston	Episode: "I'm In If You Are"
2017	Kevin Can Wait	Vinnie	Episode: "Kevin Goes Nuts"
2018	I Feel Bad	Kevin	Recurring Cast
2018	The Neighborhood	Ray Scars	Episode: "The Mezuzah"
2018–20	The Family Business	Councilman Ronald Sims	Recurring Cast: Season 1, Guest: Season 2
2019	The Name of the Rose	Pedro Lopez de Luna	Recurring Cast
2019–20	Law & Order: Special Victims Unit	Detective Frank Bucci	Guest: Season 20, Recurring Cast: Season 21
2020	Gravesend	Ray Scars	Episode: "The Mezuzah I & II"
2022	Duncanville	(voice)	Episode: "The Sharent Trap"
2024	Extended Family	Petey D.	Episode: "The Consequences of Helping People"
2025	The Family Business: New Orleans	TBA	

== Awards and nominations ==
Award	Year	Category	Nominated work	Result	Ref.
Fangoria Chainsaw Awards	2005	Best Supporting Actor	The Hillside Strangler	Nominated	
Independent Spirit Awards	1995	Best Supporting Male	Federal Hill	Nominated	
Primetime Emmy Awards	1994	Outstanding Supporting Actor in a Drama Series	NYPD Blue	Nominated	
Primetime Emmy Awards	1997	Outstanding Supporting Actor in a Drama Series	NYPD Blue	Nominated	
Screen Actors Guild Awards	1995	Outstanding Performance by an Ensemble in a Drama Series	NYPD Blue	Won	
Screen Actors Guild Awards	1996	Outstanding Performance by an Ensemble in a Drama Series	NYPD Blue	Nominated	
Screen Actors Guild Awards	1997	Outstanding Performance by an Ensemble in a Drama Series	NYPD Blue	Nominated	
Screen Actors Guild Awards	1998	Outstanding Performance by an Ensemble in a Drama Series	NYPD Blue	Nominated	
Screen Actors Guild Awards	1999	Outstanding Performance by an Ensemble in a Drama Series	NYPD Blue	Nominated	
Screen Actors Guild Awards	2000	Outstanding Performance by an Ensemble in a Drama Series	NYPD Blue	Nominated	
