= Gordon Clapp =

American actor

- Born: September 24, 1948 (age 78); North Conway, New Hampshire, U.S.
- Education: Williams College
- Occupation: Actor
- Years active: 1979–present
- Spouses: Deborah Taylor (m. 1986; div. 1999) Elisabeth Gordon (m. 2016)

Gordon Clapp (born September 24, 1948) is an American actor best known for playing Det. Greg Medavoy for all 12 seasons of the television series NYPD Blue, winning an Emmy Award in 1998.

== Early life and education ==
Clapp was born in North Conway, New Hampshire. He graduated from Williams College in 1971. At Williams College, he met frequent collaborators David Strathairn and John Sayles. Clapp also studied at The National Theater Institute at the Eugene O'Neill Theater Center (fall 1970).

== Career ==
Clapp has appeared in numerous TV shows such as Check it Out! and Night Court as well as numerous stage plays. His film credits include Return of the Secaucus 7 (1980), Running (1979), Matewan (1987), Eight Men Out (1988, as Chicago White Sox catcher Ray Schalk), Termini Station (1989), The Rage: Carrie 2 (1999), Rules of Engagement (2000), Sunshine State (2002), and Flags of Our Fathers (2006) as United States Marine Corps Gen. Holland Smith. He appeared in the Star Trek: Deep Space Nine episode "Vortex." From 1993 to 2005, Clapp played Detective Greg Medavoy on NYPD Blue. He won an Emmy for the role.

In 2007, he appeared as Coach Mad Maddox in The Game Plan. On Broadway, he appeared in the 2005 revival of David Mamet's Pulitzer Prize-winning play Glengarry Glen Ross, where he was nominated for a Tony Award for Best Performance by a Featured Actor in a Play. He also played Alan Silver in episode Holiday Spirit in Ghost Whisperer (3x10).

In 1995, he played Father Paul in Her Hidden Truth. In 2007, Clapp voiced Horny the Clown in the horror film Drive-Thru. Later that year, Clapp also appeared as Det. Dick Walenski in "In Name and Blood," season 3 episode 2 of Criminal Minds. Clapp portrayed a corrupt police officer in a 2008 episode of Cold Case. He played the main antagonist Gen. Peter Randall in the Prototype video game. Clapp plays the father of Ellen (Rose Byrne) in the F/X show Damages.

In 2014, Clapp began playing a recurring role as Chaplain Orlovsky in Chicago Fire.

In 2021, Clapp had a modest but critical role in the acclaimed HBO series Mare of Easttown, playing key witness Pat Ross.

== Personal life ==
Clapp was previously married to actress Deborah Taylor from 1986 to 1999. He married Elisabeth Gordon, whom he met through a mutual friend, on November 5, 2016.

== Filmography ==
=== Film ===
Year	Title	Role	Notes
1979	Running	Kenny	
1980	Return of the Secaucus 7	Chip	
1987	Matewan	Tom Griggs	
1988	Eight Men Out	Ray Schalk	
1989	Termini Station	Harvey Dunshane	
1989	Gross Anatomy	Doctor	
1994	April One	Gordon Davies	
1999	The Rage: Carrie 2	Eric's Father	
2000	Rules of Engagement	Harris	
2001	Skeletons in the Closet	Dan	
2002	Sunshine State	Earl Pinkney	
2002	Moonlight Mile	Tanner	
2004	The Sure Hand of God	Jefferson T. Stevens	
2006	Flags of Our Fathers	Holland Smith	
2007	Drive-Thru	Horny the Clown	Voice
2007	The Game Plan	Coach Mark Maddox	
2009	Falling Up	Colin O'Shea	
2009	The Funk Parlor	Detective Joseph Angeli	
2010	The Grind	Galt	
2015	Peter and John	Charles Roland	
2015	The Perfect Guy	Bill Forsythe	
2016	Dead Billy	Lucien	
2021	Blood Brothers: Civil War	Mr. Roland	
2027	The Phone Booth	Mr. Steward	In Production

=== Television ===
Year	Title	Role	Notes
1984	The Other Kingdom	George	Television film
1985	Hangin' In	Mr. Hepburn	Episode: "Dead Dogs Wag No Tails"
1985	Evergreen	Palm Court Waiter	Episode #1.1
1985	Letting Go	Walter	Television film
1985	ABC Weekend Special	Cop	Episode: "Pippi Longstocking"
1985–1988	Check It Out!	Various roles	49 episodes
1986	The Right of the People	Chris' Friend	Television film
1987	Hands of a Stranger	Sgt. Markey	Television film
1988	Katts and Dog	Wayne	Episode: "Birds of a Feather"
1988	Breaking All the Rules	John Haney	Television film
1989	Knightwatch	Daniels	2 episodes
1989	Small Sacrifices	Detective Doug Welch	Television film
1989	The Private Capital	Darcy	Television film
1990	Dear John	Dave Travis	Episode: "John's Friend"
1990	Family of Spies	Capt. Burnett	2 episodes
1990	Blind Faith	Det. O'Brien	2 episodes
1990	Night Court	Ralph Shannon	Episode: "I Said Dance!"
1990	Top Cops	Dennis Dutra	Episode: "Dennis Dutra"
1990	Cop Rock	Philip Beamer	Episode: "A Three-Corpse Meal"
1990	The Secret Life of Archie's Wife	Stubbs	Television film
1990, 1993	E.N.G.	Various roles	2 episodes
1991	Fever	Meeks	Television film
1991	Mission of the Shark	Elias	Television film
1992	The Wonder Years	Bruce Leegee	Episode: "Politics as Usual"
1992	Street Legal	James Brackit	2 episodes
1993	Bonds of Love	Evaluator	Television film
1993	Kiss of a Killer	Sullivan	Television film
1993	Civil Wars	Al Blynn	Episode: "Alien Aided Affection"
1993	Family of Strangers	Del	Television film
1993	Cheers	Shiner	Episode: "Look Before You Sleep"
1993	Star Trek: Deep Space Nine	Hadran	Episode: "Vortex"
1993	FBI: The Untold Stories	Gavin	Episode: "The Sting"
1993	In the Line of Duty: Ambush in Waco	Glenn	Television film
1993	Wings	Phil	Episode: "Bye-Bye, Bunny"
1993–2005	NYPD Blue	Greg Medavoy	256 episodes
1995	Abandoned and Deceived	Donald Quinn	Television film
1995	The Outer Limits	Dr. Randall Strong	Episode: "The Voice of Reason"
1995	Her Hidden Truth	Father Paul	Television film
1996	The Morrison Murders: Based on a True Story	Sheriff Byron Calhoun	Television film
1997	Badge of Betrayal	Thatcher	Television film
1997	Dead Man's Gun	Raymond Walter Jakes	Episode: "The Bounty Hunter"
2003	Less than Perfect	Detective Martin	Episode: "It Takes a Pillage"
2005	Without a Trace	Bill Shields	Episode: "The Innocents"
2005, 2006	Deadwood	Gustave	2 episodes
2006	Law & Order: Special Victims Unit	Ted Carthage	Episode: "Infected"
2006	Monk	Francis Merrigan	Episode: "Mr. Monk Gets a New Shrink"
2007	CSI: Crime Scene Investigation	Salvatore Heinz	Episode: "Meet Market"
2007	Halfway Home	Sandy	Episode: "Halfway New Guy"
2007	Criminal Minds	Det. Vic Wolynski	Episode: "In Name and Blood"
2007	Private Practice	Coach Mike	Episode: "In Which Addison Finds a Showerhead"
2007	Ghost Whisperer	Alan Silver	Episode: "Holiday Spirit"
2007–2012	Damages	Gary Parsons	3 episodes
2008	Cold Case	Daniel O'Leary	Episode: "Bad Reputation"
2009	Taking Chance	Tom Garrett	Television film
2011	In Plain Sight	Ben Kulpak	Episode: "I'm a Liver Not a Fighter"
2013	Perception	Alan Kendricks	Episode: "Ch-Ch-Changes"
2013	Grey's Anatomy	Victor Kaufman	Episode: "Somebody That I Used to Know"
2013	Mob City	Carl Steckler	4 episodes
2014–2018	Chicago Fire	Chaplain Orlovsky	11 episodes
2016	Elementary	Deputy Chief Prosky	Episode: "Henny Penny the Sky Is Falling"
2021	Mare of Easttown	Pat Ross	Episode: "Sore Must Be the Storm"
2021	American Rust	Mr. Gelsey	4 episodes
2025	Poker Face	Division Chief Wharton	Episode: "The End of the Road"
