= Andy Sipowicz =

Fictional character in television series NYPD Blue

- NYPD Blue character
- Dennis Franz as Det. Andy Sipowicz; Season 2 promotional photo
- First appearance: "Pilot"
- Last appearance: "Moving Day"
- Portrayed by: Dennis Franz

In-universe information
- Gender: Male
- Title: Detective (promoted to sergeant in season 12)
- Occupation: NYPD Detective
- Spouses: Katie Sipowicz (ex-wife); Sylvia Costas (wife, deceased); Connie McDowell (wife)
- Children: Andy Sipowicz Jr. (son, deceased); Theo Sipowicz (son); Matthew Sipowicz (son); Michelle Sipowicz (daughter)
- Nationality: Polish/American

Andrew Sipowicz Sr. is a fictional character on the ABC television series NYPD Blue. Andy began as the secondary focus of a more ensemble-like show, but by the middle of Season 6 he is the clear protagonist of the show and receives the main storyline in every episode. Dennis Franz portrayed the character for its entire run.

== Character overview ==
Sipowicz was a New York City police detective working in the detective squad of the fictional 15th Precinct of the NYPD, on the lower east side of Manhattan. He was a major character of the show during its twelve-year run, and the only one to have been a regular cast member in every episode.

In October 2018, creators Jesse Bochco, Matt Olmstead, and Nick Wootton revealed a pilot for an NYPD Blue sequel was in production. The sequel was to focus on Andy Sipowicz's son with Sylvia, Theo, who has joined the police department and earns promotion to detective while trying to solve the murder of his father. In 2019, ABC announced that the sequel had been canceled before production started.

== Background and personality ==
Jason Gay of The Boston Phoenix described Sipowicz as a "drunken, racist goon with a heart of gold" who was "the moral core" of NYPD Blue. In 1997, he described Sipowicz as becoming "sobered up" but said Sipowicz "won't ever go totally soft." Gay describes Dennis Franz as adding "underrated, edgy mixture of grit and sensitivity" to Sipowicz.

According to a third-season episode, Sipowicz was anticipating celebrating his 48th birthday on April 7, 1996, implying he was born in 1948. He is from Brooklyn, where his father, a World War II veteran of Polish-American ancestry who worked as a meter reader for ConEd, originally raised the family in temporary Quonset housing. At some time in the mid-1950s, Andy's father moved the family to a new, mostly white housing project in which he was able to purchase a federally subsidized apartment. Subsequently, the neighborhood became more diverse, and a young Andy was frequently in verbal and physical conflict with his black peers. Andy worked in a local candy store as a boy, later returning under sad conditions when a son of the shop owners organized a robbery that led to his mother's death. His father was an alcoholic whose frequent drunkenness cost him his job as a meter reader. He defiantly returned to finish his route after dark, but was hit in the head with a hammer by a black man who mistook him for a burglar, causing him to lose one eye. He claimed that the black man had tried to rob him; Andy grew up hearing the story, which was the basis for his racism. In season 6, however, he realizes that his father was lying about the circumstances of the incident, and begins to question the values he was raised with.

Before becoming a policeman, Sipowicz served in the United States Army for two and a half years, including at least 18 months on active duty in Vietnam beginning in 1968 which he did not talk much about, although it is an underlying theme in the show. He once became incensed when an obnoxious fellow cop named Sgt. Ray Kahlins, also a Vietnam veteran, lied about being in combat, and told Kahlins he could lie to his heart's content about anything else, but not about his Vietnam War service. In 1970, he joined the NYPD "right out of 'Nam" (as referenced in episode 4 of season 4). While in uniform, Sipowicz was partnered with Kurt Kreizer and served under Al Angelotti, then a sergeant, in the 25th precinct. One of his early police assignments was infiltrating the Black Panthers organization and posing as a white leftist radical. These events accentuated his already-developing racist tendencies.

In 1979, Sipowicz received the gold shield of Detective Third Grade (the "beginning" rank) and briefly worked in the Robbery Squad at the 28th Precinct alongside John Clark Sr., before transferring back as a detective to the 15th, where he previously worked as a uniformed officer. He was promoted to Second Grade two years prior to the start of the series in fall 1993, and was promoted to First Grade in late 2001.

Based on information revealed in various episodes cited above, the timeline of Sipowicz's career can be fairly accurately assembled:

- 1948 – Born in Brooklyn, NY
- 1966 – Drafted into the U.S. Army and serves tour of active duty in Vietnam
- 1969 – Returns to New York and enrolls in police force. As an anti-crime trainee, is immediately assigned to infiltrate the Black Panthers undercover as a white radical.
- 1970 – Completes the police academy and begins normal uniformed police work at Manhattan's 25th precinct.
- 1972 – Marries Katie, a lifelong office employee at AT&T/NYNEX
- 1973 – Birth of Andy Jr. In Andy's later self-estimation, his alcoholism first became an active problem in this year.
- 1977 – Reassigned to the 15th precinct
- Early 1979 – Earns promotion to Detective Third Grade and assigned to the Robbery Squad working out of the 28th precinct; has a series of bad interactions with his colleague John Clark Sr.
- Late 1979 – Transfers to the 15th Detective Squad with homicide investigations as primary responsibility; partnered with Joe Brockhurst
- 1983 – Due to the effects of his increasing alcoholism, divorces Katie and no longer has contact with Andy Jr. for the next eight years.
- 1986 – Begins partnership with John Kelly
- 1990 – A brief attempt at rekindling a relationship with Andy Jr. does not work out. Katie and Andy Jr. move to an apartment in north New Jersey and do not have personal contact with Andy for another three years.
- 1991 – Promoted to Detective Second Grade
- Early 1992 – Assigned new direct superior, Lieutenant Arthur Fancy. Sipowicz's first time working under an African-American boss and a boss who will not look the other way on his drinking.
- Fall 1993 – Nearly dies after being shot by Alfonse Giardella; given an ultimatum to change his behavior or be forced out of the police department by Lt. Fancy; stops drinking; reconciles with Andy Jr.
- Fall 1994 – Andy begins attending formal Alcoholics Anonymous meetings. John Kelly forced out of department; Andy partnered with Bobby Simone
- Spring 1995 – Marries Sylvia Costas
- Spring 1996 – Birth of Theo; death of Andy Jr.; Andy relapses for the second and final time since beginning recovery in 1993 and from this point on does not use alcohol for the rest of the show
- First week of December 1998 – Death of Bobby
- January 1999 – Andy partnered with Danny Sorenson
- Spring 1999 – Death of Sylvia
- Summer 2001 – Disappearance of Danny (later revealed to have been killed); Andy partnered with John Clark Jr.
- Fall 2001 – Promoted to Detective First Grade
- Spring 2003 – Moves in with Connie McDowell and adopts Connie's niece Michelle
- Fall 2003 – Marries Connie
- Spring 2004 – Birth to Connie of Matthew, Andy's fourth child, third biological child, and second surviving biological child
- Spring 2005 – Promoted to Sergeant and given command of 15th Detective Squad, expresses intention to remain in this role until planned retirement in 2010

In conversations during the show, Sipowicz has also alluded to working in Queens Homicide and alongside Roy Shaughnessy at the 20th precinct, and in Manhattan North, at some point prior to 1993.

== Role within the show ==
In the first season of NYPD Blue, Sipowicz's partner is John Kelly, who leaves the force in 1994 after withholding evidence in a murder investigation of his lover Janice Licalsi. After Kelly's resignation, Bobby Simone becomes Sipowicz's partner. They soon become best friends; Sipowicz is devastated when Simone dies of a heart infection in 1998. In 1994, Andy begins to date Assistant District Attorney Sylvia Costas, with whom he previously clashed due to professional differences (Sipowicz calls her a "pissy little bitch" in the pilot episode). They get married in 1995 and have a son, Theo, in 1996.

Andy was previously married to Katie Sipowicz for 11 years and they had a son, Andy Jr. (born 1973). By 1993 both his ex-wife and son were estranged from him, due to his heavy drinking, and his job is perpetually in jeopardy due to the effects of his alcoholism and his increasingly outdated bigoted attitudes. In the spring of 1992 the 15th squad, where Sipowicz has been a detective for just over 12 years, receives a new commander, the straitlaced African-American lieutenant Arthur Fancy, who has little patience for Sipowicz's racism, sloppy personal habits, and rogue tendencies. In the show's pilot episode, after being shot six times in an ambush by a mobster named Alphonse Giardella and almost dying, Sipowicz decides to change his life. He stops drinking, focuses on the job, and rebuilds his relationship with his son. Fancy states outright that he was prepared to have Sipowicz removed from the force on the day of his shooting and only gives him another chance, starting with restricted desk duty, because of the incident.

On his route to becoming a better man, Sipowicz struggles to overcome his bigotry with the help of his partner Bobby Simone, he and Fancy continue to have beefs but always resolve them. He also eventually comes to terms with his homophobia, mainly due to his initially grudging friendship with precinct Police Administrative Assistant John Irvin. With the birth of his second son, Sipowicz's life seems to be going well, but a series of devastating personal tragedies over the next few years arise. In May 1996, Andy Jr., who is about to start work as a policeman in Hackensack, New Jersey, is shot and killed while trying to stop a robbery. The shooting sends Andy Sr. into an alcoholic relapse, during which Sylvia briefly throws him out of the house. In November 1998, Bobby Simone dies of an infection caused by heart transplant complications, and less than a year later in May 1999, Sylvia is accidentally killed by the distraught father of PAA Dolores Mayo (whose killer she had been prosecuting) outside the courtroom. This is then followed by the disappearance and subsequent murder of Simone's successor Danny Sorenson during an undercover assignment in 2001. Andy also survives a serious bout with prostate cancer in 1998. With the exception of Andy Jr.'s death, Sipowicz remains sober in the face of all of these tragedies. He also has to deal with the fact that he had been instrumental in putting an innocent black man in prison for 18 years for the murder of a teenager, remembering that he had no experience as a detective and deferred to a lazy veteran cop. He is the only cop to apologize when the man is released (he learns that the perpetrator was a white man who later died of a drug overdose and while Sipowicz and the retired veteran cop basically knew he'd been murdered, the end result of the case was left unresolved).

In 2003, Sipowicz marries for the third time, this time to Connie McDowell, a fellow detective who had recently joined the squad. The year before, Connie's pregnant sister is killed by her abusive husband. The baby survives, so Connie and Sipowicz take custody of the child and name her Michelle, after her mother. Soon after, Connie, who had believed she could not have children due to scarring of her fallopian tubes, becomes pregnant and gives birth to a baby boy named Matthew. With two infants to raise, Connie resigns from the police force to be a stay-at-home mother. Later that year, Sipowicz overcomes a personality clash with new Lt. Thomas Bale, is promoted to sergeant and persuades a reluctant chief of detectives to name him the new squad commander.

== Partners ==
Based on information revealed in various episodes cited above:

- 1986–1994: John Kelly (David Caruso, seasons 1–2)
- 1994–1998: Bobby Simone (Jimmy Smits, seasons 2–6, guest season 12)
- 1999–2001: Danny Sorenson (Ricky Schroder, seasons 6–8)
- 2001–2005: John Clark Jr. (Mark-Paul Gosselaar, seasons 9–12)

== Reception ==
In 1999, TV Guide ranked him #23 on its 50 Greatest TV Characters of All Time list.
