= List of NYPD Blue episodes =

NYPD Blue is an American police procedural drama television series set in New York City, exploring the struggles of the fictional 15th Precinct detective squad in Manhattan. Each episode typically intertwines several plots involving an ensemble cast.

The series was originally broadcast on the ABC network, debuted on September 21, 1993‚ and aired its final episode on March 1, 2005. During the course of the series, 261 episodes of NYPD Blue aired over twelve seasons. It was ABC's longest-running primetime one-hour drama series until Grey's Anatomy surpassed it in 2016.

The episodes "Lost Israel (Part 2)" from season 5 and "Hearts and Souls" from season 6 both aired as extended 90-minute specials during their original airings on ABC. In order to fit in the show's usual 60-minute timeslot, each episode had a cut-down version produced that removed most subplots and focused only on the main storyline. The 60-minute version of each episode is the only version rebroadcast in reruns and syndication, the only version available on streaming services such as Hulu, and the only version that was remastered in HD. The full 90-minute versions of these episodes are available in standard definition on the DVD releases of the seasons.

The episode pairs "Lie Like a Rug: Part 1" and "Johnny Got His Gold: Part 2", and "Better Laid Than Never: Parts 1 & 2," from season 9, both originally aired as extended 120-minute specials edited as a single episode, without a second set of opening titles or end credits. The double-length episodes were divided into two 60-minute episodes each for future reruns, syndication, streaming.

== Series overview ==
| Season | Episodes | Originally released | | Rank | Rating (seasons 1–4)/ Viewers (in millions) (seasons 5–12) |
| Season | Episodes | First released | Last released | Rank | Rating (seasons 1–4)/ Viewers (in millions) (seasons 5–12) |
|---|---|---|---|---|---|
| 1 | 22 | September 21, 1993 | May 17, 1994 | 18 | 13.9 (Note: Tied with Wings) |
| 2 | 22 | October 11, 1994 | May 23, 1995 | 7 | 16.5 |
| 3 | 22 | October 24, 1995 | May 21, 1996 | 10 | 14.1 |
| 4 | 22 | October 15, 1996 | May 20, 1997 | 13 | 12.5 |
| 5 | 22 | September 30, 1997 | May 19, 1998 | 19 | 15.0 |
| 6 | 22 | October 20, 1998 | May 25, 1999 | 12 | 14.4 |
| 7 | 22 | January 11, 2000 | May 23, 2000 | 17 | 15.6 |
| 8 | 20 | January 9, 2001 | May 22, 2001 | 23 | 16.2 |
| 9 | 23 | November 6, 2001 | May 21, 2002 | 31 | 12.3 |
| 10 | 22 | September 24, 2002 | May 20, 2003 | 34 | 11.3 |
| 11 | 22 | September 23, 2003 | May 11, 2004 | 51 | 9.9 |
| 12 | 20 | September 21, 2004 | March 1, 2005 | 42 | 10.1 |

== Episodes ==
=== Season 1 (1993–94) ===
| No. overall | No. in season | Title | Directed by | Written by | Original release date | Prod. code | U.S. viewers (millions) |
|---|---|---|---|---|---|---|---|
| 1 | 1 | "Pilot" | Gregory Hoblit | Story by : David Milch & Steven Bochco; Teleplay by : David Milch | September 21, 1993 | 0K01/5101 | 22.8 |
| 2 | 2 | "4B or Not 4B" | Gregory Hoblit | Story by : David Milch & Steven Bochco; Teleplay by : David Milch | September 28, 1993 | 0K02/5102 | 20.3 |
| 3 | 3 | "Brown Appetit" | Gregory Hoblit | Story by : David Milch & Steven Bochco; Teleplay by : David Milch | October 5, 1993 | 0K03/5103 | 21.0 |
| 4 | 4 | "True Confessions" | Charles Haid | Story by : Art Monterastelli and David Milch & Steven Bochco; Teleplay by : David Milch and Art Monterastelli | October 12, 1993 | K506/5105 | 21.2 |
| 5 | 5 | "Emission Accomplished" | Michael M. Robin | Ted Mann | October 19, 1993 | 0K11/5111 | 19.6 |
| 6 | 6 | "Personal Foul" | Brad Silberling | Story by : David Milch; Teleplay by : Burton Armus | October 26, 1993 | 0K08/5108 | 22.2 |
| 7 | 7 | "NYPD Lou" | Gregory Hoblit | Ted Mann | November 2, 1993 | 0K07/5107 | 19.7 |
| 8 | 8 | "Tempest in a C-Cup" | Daniel Sackheim | Gardner Stern | November 16, 1993 | 0K10/5110 | 19.8 |
| 9 | 9 | "Ice Follies" | Dennis Dugan | W.K. Scott Meyer | November 30, 1993 | 0K09/5109 | 18.5 |
| 10 | 10 | "Oscar, Meyer, Weiner" | Brad Silberling | Ted Mann & Gardner Stern | December 7, 1993 | 0K12/5112 | 17.5 |
| 11 | 11 | "From Hare to Eternity" | Eric Laneuville | David Milch & Burton Armus | December 14, 1993 | 0K13/5113 | 19.0 |
| 12 | 12 | "Up on the Roof" | Michael M. Robin | George D. Putnam | January 4, 1994 | 0K14/5114 | 20.7 |
| 13 | 13 | "Abandando Abandoned" | Gregory Hoblit | Story by : David Milch & Steven Bochco; Teleplay by : Ted Mann & Gardner Stern | January 11, 1994 | 0K15/5115 | 20.5 |
| 14 | 14 | "Jumpin' Jack Fleishman" | Rick Wallace | Story by : Steven Bochco & David Milch; Teleplay by : Ted Mann & Gardner Stern & Burton Armus | January 18, 1994 | 0K16/5116 | 21.7 |
| 15 | 15 | "Steroid Roy" | Félix Alcalá | Ann Biderman | February 8, 1994 | 0K17/5117 | 23.5 |
| 16 | 16 | "A Sudden Fish" | Lesli Linka Glatter | Story by : Steven Bochco & David Milch; Teleplay by : Burton Armus & Gardner Stern | February 15, 1994 | 0K18/5118 | 17.8 |
| 17 | 17 | "Black Men Can Jump" | Jesús S. Treviño | Story by : Steven Bochco & David Milch; Teleplay by : Ted Mann | March 1, 1994 | 0K19/5119 | 22.2 |
| 18 | 18 | "Zeppo Marks Brothers" | Michael M. Robin | Story by : Steven Bochco & David Milch; Teleplay by : Ann Biderman | March 22, 1994 | 0K20/5120 | 19.9 |
| 19 | 19 | "Serge the Concierge" | Lesli Linka Glatter | Story by : Bill Clark; Teleplay by : David Milch & Gardner Stern & Burton Armus | March 29, 1994 | 0K21/5121 | 21.2 |
| 20 | 20 | "Good Time Charlie" | Gregory Hoblit | Story by : Steven Bochco & David Milch; Teleplay by : Ted Mann & Ann Biderman | May 3, 1994 | 0K22/5122 | 19.0 |
| 21 | 21 | "Guns 'N' Rosaries" | Michael M. Robin | Story by : Steven Bochco & David Milch; Teleplay by : Burton Armus & Gardner Stern | May 10, 1994 | 0K23/5123 | 22.8 |
| 22 | 22 | "Rockin' Robin" | Gregory Hoblit | Story by : Jody Worth; Teleplay by : Jody Worth & Ted Mann | May 17, 1994 | 0K24/5124 | 23.2 |

=== Season 2 (1994–95) ===
| No. overall | No. in season | Title | Directed by | Written by | Original release date | Prod. code | U.S. viewers (millions) |
|---|---|---|---|---|---|---|---|
| 23 | 1 | "Trials & Tribulations" | Gregory Hoblit | Story by : Steven Bochco & David Milch; Teleplay by : Ted Mann | October 11, 1994 | 0V01/5201 | 24.3 |
| 24 | 2 | "For Whom the Skell Rolls" | Michael M. Robin | Story by : Steven Bochco & David Milch; Teleplay by : Gardner Stern | October 18, 1994 | 0V02/5202 | 22.1 |
| 25 | 3 | "Cop Suey" | Mark Tinker | Charles H. Eglee & Channing Gibson | October 25, 1994 | 0V03/5203 | 24.7 |
| 26 | 4 | "Dead and Gone" | Daniel Sackheim | Leonard Gardner | November 1, 1994 | 0V04/5204 | 28.8 |
| 27 | 5 | "Simone Says" | Gregory Hoblit | Story by : Steven Bochco & David Milch & Walon Green; Teleplay by : David Milch & Walon Green | November 15, 1994 | 0V07/5207 | 25.7 |
| 28 | 6 | "The Final Adjustment" | Dennis Dugan | Story by : Christopher McQuarrie; Teleplay by : Charles H. Eglee & Channing Gibson & Ted Mann | November 22, 1994 | 0V05/5205 | 25.6 |
| 29 | 7 | "Double Abandando" | Andy Wolk | Story by : Walon Green; Teleplay by : Ted Mann & Gardner Stern & Burton Armus | November 29, 1994 | 0V06/5206 | 26.5 |
| 30 | 8 | "You Bet Your Life" | Elodie Keene | Story by : Eric Newman & Tom Towles; Teleplay by : Eric Newman & Tom Towles and Leonard Gardner | December 6, 1994 | 0V08/5208 | 27.4 |
| 31 | 9 | "Don We Now Our Gay Apparel" | Michael M. Robin | Story by : Steven Bochco & David Milch; Teleplay by : Channing Gibson & Charles H. Eglee | January 3, 1995 | 0V09/5209 | 24.8 |
| 32 | 10 | "In The Butt, Bob" | Donna Deitch | Story by : Steven Bochco & David Milch; Teleplay by : Ted Mann & Burton Armus & Gardner Stern | January 10, 1995 | 0V10/5210 | 25.2 |
| 33 | 11 | "Vishy-Vashy-Vinny" | Michael M. Robin | Story by : Steven Bochco & David Milch; Teleplay by : Ted Mann & Burton Armus & Gardner Stern | January 17, 1995 | 0V11/5211 | 24.6 |
| 34 | 12 | "Large Mouth Bass" | Charles Haid | Theresa Rebeck | February 7, 1995 | 0V12/5212 | 23.9 |
| 35 | 13 | "Travels With Andy" | Mark Tinker | Rosemary Breslin | February 14, 1995 | 0V13/5213 | 23.3 |
| 36 | 14 | "A Murder With Teeth In It" | Donna Deitch | Franklyn Ajaye & Barry Douglass | February 21, 1995 | 0V14/5214 | 25.0 |
| 37 | 15 | "Bombs Away" | Jorge Montesi | Story by : Steven Bochco & David Milch & Bill Clark; Teleplay by : Ted Mann & Gardner Stern | February 28, 1995 | 0V15/5215 | 22.8 |
| 38 | 16 | "Un-American Graffiti" | Joe Ann Fogle | Leonard Gardner | March 14, 1995 | 0V16/5216 | 23.5 |
| 39 | 17 | "Dirty Socks" | Elodie Keene | Larry Cohen | March 21, 1995 | 0V17/5217 | 23.6 |
| 40 | 18 | "Innuendo" | Mark Tinker | Story by : Walon Green & David Mills; Teleplay by : David Mills | April 4, 1995 | 0V18/5218 | 24.0 |
| 41 | 19 | "Boxer Rebellion" | Jorge Montesi | Story by : Walon Green & Bill Clark; Teleplay by : Walon Green & Ted Mann & Gardner Stern | May 2, 1995 | 0V19/5219 | 20.2 |
| 42 | 20 | "The Bookie and Kooky Cookie" | Mark Piznarski | George D. Putnam | May 9, 1995 | 0V20/5220 | 22.2 |
| 43 | 21 | "The Bank Dick" | Michael M. Robin | Victor Bumbalo | May 16, 1995 | 0V21/5221 | 20.8 |
| 44 | 22 | "A.D.A. Sipowicz" | Mark Tinker | Story by : Steven Bochco & David Milch; Teleplay by : Ted Mann & Gardner Stern & Nicholas Wootton | May 23, 1995 | 0V22/5222 | 25.0 |

=== Season 3 (1995–96) ===
| No. overall | No. in season | Title | Directed by | Written by | Original release date | Prod. code | U.S. viewers (millions) |
|---|---|---|---|---|---|---|---|
| 45 | 1 | "E.R." | Mark Tinker | Story by : David Milch & David Mills; Teleplay by : David Mills | October 24, 1995 | 0G01/5301 | 24.7 |
| 46 | 2 | "Torah! Torah! Torah!" | Donna Deitch | Story by : Theresa Rebeck & Bill Clark; Teleplay by : Theresa Rebeck | October 31, 1995 | 0G02/5302 | 21.9 |
| 47 | 3 | "One Big Happy Family" | Michael M. Robin | Gardner Stern | November 7, 1995 | 0G03/5303 | 21.2 |
| 48 | 4 | "Heavin’ Can Wait" | Elodie Keene | Story by : Leonard Gardner & Bill Clark; Teleplay by : Leonard Gardner | November 14, 1995 | 0G04/5304 | 21.0 |
| 49 | 5 | "Dirty Laundry" | Mark Tinker | David Milch & Nicholas Wootton | November 21, 1995 | 0G05/5305 | 22.7 |
| 50 | 6 | "Curt Russell" | Jim Charleston | Story by : Bill Clark & Leonard Gardner; Teleplay by : Leonard Gardner | November 28, 1995 | 0G06/5306 | 21.9 |
| 51 | 7 | "Aging Bull" | Davis Guggenheim | David Mills | December 12, 1995 | 0G07/5307 | 20.1 |
| 52 | 8 | "Cold Heaters" | Adam Nimoy | Story by : Bill Clark & Theresa Rebeck; Teleplay by : Theresa Rebeck | December 19, 1995 | 0G08/5308 | 20.6 |
| 53 | 9 | "Sorry, Wong Suspect" | Michael M. Robin | Story by : Bill Clark & Gardner Stern; Teleplay by : Gardner Stern | January 9, 1996 | 0G09/5309 | 21.5 |
| 54 | 10 | "The Backboard Jungle" | Mark Tinker | Story by : William L. Morris; Teleplay by : David Mills | January 16, 1996 | 0G10/5310 | 20.8 |
| 55 | 11 | "Burnin' Love" | Perry Lang | Story by : Bill Clark & Leonard Gardner; Teleplay by : Leonard Gardner | January 30, 1996 | 0G11/5311 | 19.8 |
| 56 | 12 | "These Old Bones" | Donna Deitch | Theresa Rebeck | February 6, 1996 | 0G12/5312 | 20.1 |
| 57 | 13 | "A Tushful of Dollars" | Elodie Keene | Story by : Bill Clark & Nicholas Wootton; Teleplay by : Nicholas Wootton | February 13, 1996 | 0G13/5313 | 19.1 |
| 58 | 14 | "The Nutty Confessor" | Mark Tinker | Story by : Bill Clark & Gardner Stern; Teleplay by : Gardner Stern | February 20, 1996 | 0G14/5314 | 20.2 |
| 59 | 15 | "Head Case" | Randy Zisk | Story by : David Mills & Bill Clark; Teleplay by : David Mills | February 27, 1996 | 0G15/5315 | 18.8 |
| 60 | 16 | "Girl Talk" | Perry Lang | Story by : Bill Clark & Theresa Rebeck; Teleplay by : Theresa Rebeck | March 19, 1996 | 0G16/5316 | 18.1 |
| 61 | 17 | "Hollie and the Blowfish" | Davis Guggenheim | Story by : Bill Clark & David Simon; Teleplay by : David Simon | March 26, 1996 | 0G17/5317 | 18.0 |
| 62 | 18 | "We Was Robbed" | Mark Tinker | Story by : Bill Clark & Leonard Gardner; Teleplay by : Leonard Gardner | April 2, 1996 | 0G18/5318 | 19.7 |
| 63 | 19 | "Auntie Maimed" | Michael Watkins | Story by : Bill Clark & Nicholas Wootton; Teleplay by : Nicholas Wootton | April 30, 1996 | 0G19/5319 | 17.7 |
| 64 | 20 | "A Death In the Family" | Mark Tinker | Michael Daly | May 7, 1996 | 0G20/5320 | 20.9 |
| 65 | 21 | "Closing Time" | David Rosenbloom | Story by : Bill Clark & David Mills; Teleplay by : David Mills | May 14, 1996 | 0G21/5321 | 19.8 |
| 66 | 22 | "He’s Not Guilty, He’s My Brother" | Michael M. Robin | Story by : Bill Clark & Bob Glaudini; Teleplay by : Bob Glaudini | May 21, 1996 | 0G22/5322 | 18.8 |

=== Season 4 (1996–97) ===
| No. overall | No. in season | Title | Directed by | Written by | Original release date | Prod. code | U.S. viewers (millions) |
|---|---|---|---|---|---|---|---|
| 67 | 1 | "Moby Greg" | Mark Tinker | Story by : David Milch & Bill Clark; Teleplay by : Theresa Rebeck | October 15, 1996 | 0H01/5401 | 21.57 |
| 68 | 2 | "Thick Stu" | Brad Silberling | Story by : David Milch & Bill Clark; Teleplay by : David Mills | October 22, 1996 | 0H02/5402 | 19.36 |
| 69 | 3 | "Yes, We Have No Cannolis" | Mark Tinker | Story by : David Milch & Bill Clark; Teleplay by : Leonard Gardner | October 29, 1996 | 0H03/5403 | 20.38 |
| 70 | 4 | "Where's 'Swaldo" | Mark Tinker | Stephen Gaghan & Michael R. Perry and David Milch | November 12, 1996 | 0H05/5405 | 18.93 |
| 71 | 5 | "Where'd the Van Gogh" | Michael M. Robin | Story by : David Milch & Bill Clark; Teleplay by : Nicholas Wootton | November 19, 1996 | 0H04/5404 | 17.82 |
| 72 | 6 | "Yes Sir, That's My Baby" | Davis Guggenheim | Rift Fournier | November 26, 1996 | 0H06/5406 | 19.25 |
| 73 | 7 | "Ted and Carey's Bogus Adventure" | Daniel Sackheim | Meredith Stiehm | December 3, 1996 | 0H07/5407 | 18.50 |
| 74 | 8 | "Unembraceable You" | Michael M. Robin | Story by : Bill Clark & Theresa Rebeck; Teleplay by : Theresa Rebeck | December 10, 1996 | 0H08/5408 | 17.82 |
| 75 | 9 | "Caulksmanship" | Donna Deitch | Story by : David Milch & Bill Clark; Teleplay by : George D. Putnam | December 17, 1996 | 0H09/5409 | 17.81 |
| 76 | 10 | "My Wild Irish Nose" | Bob Doherty | Hugh Levick | January 7, 1997 | 0H10/5410 | 17.80 |
| 77 | 11 | "Alice Doesn't Fit Here Anymore" | Mark Tinker | Story by : David Milch & Bill Clark; Teleplay by : Leonard Gardner & Nicholas Wootton | January 14, 1997 | 0H11/5411 | 19.60 |
| 78 | 12 | "Upstairs, Downstairs" | Paris Barclay | Story by : Bill Clark & David Mills; Teleplay by : David Mills | January 21, 1997 | 0H12/5412 | 18.89 |
| 79 | 13 | "Tom and Geri" | Adam Nimoy | Story by : David Milch & Bill Clark; Teleplay by : Meredith Stiehm | January 28, 1997 | 0H13/5413 | 18.56 |
| 80 | 14 | "A Remington Original" | Michael M. Robin | Story by : David Milch & Bill Clark; Teleplay by : Nicholas Wootton | February 11, 1997 | 0H14/5414 | 18.29 |
| 81 | 15 | "Taillight's Last Gleaming" | Randy Zisk | David Mills | February 18, 1997 | 0H15/5415 | 17.22 |
| 82 | 16 | "What A Dump!" | Perry Lang | Story by : David Milch & Bill Clark; Teleplay by : Leonard Gardner | February 25, 1997 | 0H16/5416 | 17.62 |
| 83 | 17 | "A Wrenching Experience" | Michael Watkins | Story by : David Milch & Bill Clark; Teleplay by : Meredith Stiehm | April 15, 1997 | 0H17/5417 | 17.83 |
| 84 | 18 | "I Love Lucy" | Kathy Bates | Story by : David Milch & Theresa Rebeck; Teleplay by : Theresa Rebeck | April 22, 1997 | 0H18/5418 | 15.88 |
| 85 | 19 | "Bad Rap" | Matthew Penn | Thad Mumford | April 29, 1997 | 0H19/5419 | 16.99 |
| 86 | 20 | "Emission Impossible" | Bob Doherty | Story by : David Milch & Bill Clark; Teleplay by : Bill Barich | May 6, 1997 | 0H20/5420 | 15.16 |
| 87 | 21 | "Is Paris Burning?" | Paris Barclay | David Shore | May 13, 1997 | 0H21/5421 | 15.56 |
| 88 | 22 | "A Draining Experience" | Michael Watkins | Jane Wallace | May 20, 1997 | 0H22/5422 | 17.26 |

=== Season 5 (1997–98) ===
| No. overall | No. in season | Title | Directed by | Written by | Original release date | Prod. code | U.S. viewers (millions) |
|---|---|---|---|---|---|---|---|
| 89 | 1 | "As Flies to Careless Boys..." | Mark Tinker | David Milch | September 30, 1997 | 0T01/5501 | 18.07 |
| 90 | 2 | "All’s Wells That Ends Well" | Paris Barclay | Story by : David Milch & Bill Clark; Teleplay by : Leonard Gardner | October 7, 1997 | 0T02/5502 | 18.64 |
| 91 | 3 | "Three Girls and a Baby" | Mark Tinker | Story by : David Milch & Bill Clark; Teleplay by : Meredith Stiehm | October 14, 1997 | 0T03/5503 | 18.27 |
| 92 | 4 | "The Truth Is Out There" | Dennis Dugan | Story by : David Milch & Bill Clark; Teleplay by : Edward Allen Bernero | October 28, 1997 | 0T04/5504 | 15.32 |
| 93 | 5 | "It Takes a Village" | Farrel Jane Levy | Story by : David Milch & Catherine Stribling; Teleplay by : Catherine Stribling | November 4, 1997 | 0T05/5505 | 17.47 |
| 94 | 6 | "Dead Man Talking" | Donna Deitch | Jason Cahill | November 11, 1997 | 0T06/5506 | 16.44 |
| 95 | 7 | "Sheedy Dealings" | Dennis Dugan | Story by : David Milch & Bill Clark; Teleplay by : Kevin Stevens | November 18, 1997 | 0T07/5507 | 15.13 |
| 96 | 8 | "Lost Israel (Part 1)" | Steven DePaul | Story by : Ted Mann & Bill Clark & Meredith Stiehm; Teleplay by : David Milch & Ted Mann | November 25, 1997 | 0T08/5508 | 15.69 |
| 97 | 9 | "Lost Israel (Part 2)" | Paris Barclay | Story by : David Milch & Bill Clark; Teleplay by : David Milch & Nicholas Wootton | December 9, 1997 | 0T09/5509 | 18.25 |
| 98 | 10 | "Remembrance of Humps Past" | Jake Paltrow | Story by : David Milch, Bill Clark & John Chambers; Teleplay by : John Chambers | December 16, 1997 | 0T10/5510 | 15.59 |
| 99 | 11 | "You’re Under a Rasta" | Bob Doherty | Story by : David Milch & Bill Clark; Teleplay by : Jody Worth | January 6, 1998 | 0T11/5511 | 16.20 |
| 100 | 12 | "A Box of Wendy" | Mark Tinker | Story by : David Milch & Bill Clark; Teleplay by : Meredith Stiehm | January 13, 1998 | 0T12/5512 | 16.97 |
| 101 | 13 | "Twin Petes" | Matthew Penn | Story by : David Milch & Bill Clark; Teleplay by : T.J. English | February 10, 1998 | 0T13/5513 | 13.17 |
| 102 | 14 | "Weaver of Hate" | Paris Barclay | Story by : David Milch & Bill Clark; Teleplay by : Dennis Woods-Doderer | February 17, 1998 | 0T14/5514 | 15.08 |
| 103 | 15 | "Don’t Kill the Messenger" | Matthew Penn | Story by : David Milch & Bill Clark; Teleplay by : Leonard Gardner | February 24, 1998 | 0T15/5515 | 16.62 |
| 104 | 16 | "The One That Got Away" | Steven DePaul | Adisa Iwa | March 3, 1998 | 0T16/5516 | 16.10 |
| 105 | 17 | "Speak for Yourself, Bruce Clayton" | Mark Tinker | Story by : David Milch & Bill Clark; Teleplay by : Jody Worth | March 24, 1998 | 0T17/5517 | 15.71 |
| 106 | 18 | "I Don’t Wanna Dye" | Perry Lang | Story by : David Milch & Bill Clark & Jill Goldsmith; Teleplay by : Jill Goldsmith | March 31, 1998 | 0T18/5518 | 15.27 |
| 107 | 19 | "Prostrate Before the Law" | Paris Barclay | Story by : David Milch & Bill Clark; Teleplay by : Robert Ward | April 28, 1998 | 0T19/5519 | 14.41 |
| 108 | 20 | "Hammer Time" | Mark Tinker | Story by : David Milch & Bill Clark; Teleplay by : Meredith Stiehm & Nicholas Wootton | May 5, 1998 | 0T20/5520 | 14.35 |
| 109 | 21 | "Seminal Thinking" | Matthew Penn | Story by : David Milch & Bill Clark & Kevin Arkadie; Teleplay by : Kevin Arkadie | May 12, 1998 | 0T21/5521 | 14.75 |
| 110 | 22 | "Honeymoon at Viagra Falls" | Paris Barclay | Story by : David Milch & Bill Clark; Teleplay by : David Milch and Scott Williams | May 19, 1998 | 0T22/5522 | 15.24 |

=== Season 6 (1998–99) ===
| No. overall | No. in season | Title | Directed by | Written by | Original release date | Prod. code | U.S. viewers (millions) |
|---|---|---|---|---|---|---|---|
| 111 | 1 | "Top Gum" | Mark Tinker | Story by : Steven Bochco & David Milch & Bill Clark; Teleplay by : Meredith Stiehm | October 20, 1998 | 0C01/5601 | 15.66 |
| 112 | 2 | "Cop in a Bottle" | Paris Barclay | Story by : Steven Bochco & David Milch & Bill Clark; Teleplay by : Matt Olmstead | October 27, 1998 | 0C02/5602 | 15.98 |
| 113 | 3 | "Numb and Number" | Mark Tinker | Story by : Steven Bochco & David Milch & Bill Clark; Teleplay by : Leonard Gardner | November 10, 1998 | 0C03/5603 | 16.10 |
| 114 | 4 | "Brother's Keeper" | Donna Deitch | Story by : Steven Bochco & David Milch & Bill Clark; Teleplay by : Doug Palau | November 17, 1998 | 0C04/5604 | 16.86 |
| 115 | 5 | "Hearts and Souls" | Paris Barclay | Story by : Steven Bochco & David Milch & Bill Clark; Teleplay by : Nicholas Wootton | November 24, 1998 | 0C05/5605 | 22.10 |
| 116 | 6 | "Danny Boy" | Mark Tinker | Story by : Steven Bochco & David Milch & Bill Clark; Teleplay by : Meredith Stiehm | December 1, 1998 | 0C06/5606 | 18.74 |
| 117 | 7 | "Czech Bouncer" | Paris Barclay | Story by : David Milch & Bill Clark; Teleplay by : Matt Olmstead | December 8, 1998 | 0C07/5607 | 17.77 |
| 118 | 8 | "Raging Bulls" | Steven DePaul | Story by : Steven Bochco & David Milch & Bill Clark; Teleplay by : Leonard Gardner | December 15, 1998 | 0C08/5608 | 18.09 |
| 119 | 9 | "Grime Scene" | Michael M. Robin | Story by : David Milch & Bill Clark; Teleplay by : Doug Palau & Nicholas Wootton | January 5, 1999 | 0C09/5609 | 15.34 |
| 120 | 10 | "Show and Tell" | Marc Buckland | Story by : David Milch & Bill Clark; Teleplay by : Matt Olmstead | January 12, 1999 | 0C10/5610 | 16.30 |
| 121 | 11 | "Big Bang Theory" | Jake Paltrow | Story by : David Milch & Bill Clark; Teleplay by : Ted Mann | February 9, 1999 | 0C11/5611 | 14.50 |
| 122 | 12 | "What's Up, Chuck?" | Bob Doherty | Story by : David Milch & Bill Clark; Teleplay by : John Chambers | February 16, 1999 | 0C12/5612 | 14.88 |
| 123 | 13 | "Dead Girl Walking" | Paris Barclay | Story by : David Milch & Bill Clark; Teleplay by : Leonard Gardner | February 23, 1999 | 0C13/5613 | 14.42 |
| 124 | 14 | "Raphael's Inferno" | Matthew Penn | Story by : David Milch & Bill Clark; Teleplay by : Doug Palau | March 2, 1999 | 0C14/5614 | 14.23 |
| 125 | 15 | "I Have a Dream" | Marc Buckland | Story by : David Milch & Bill Clark; Teleplay by : Nicholas Wootton | April 6, 1999 | 0C15/5615 | 13.56 |
| 126 | 16 | "Tain't Misbehavin'" | Karen Gaviola | Story by : David Milch & Bill Clark; Teleplay by : Matt Olmstead | April 13, 1999 | 0C16/5616 | 13.53 |
| 127 | 17 | "Don't Meth With Me" | Steven DePaul | Story by : David Milch & Bill Clark; Teleplay by : Jody Worth | April 20, 1999 | 0C17/5617 | 11.46 |
| 128 | 18 | "Mister Roberts" | Mark Tinker | Story by : David Milch & Bill Clark; Teleplay by : Michael A. Graham | April 27, 1999 | 0C18/5618 | 15.34 |
| 129 | 19 | "Judas Priest" | Dennis M. White | Story by : David Milch & Bill Clark; Teleplay by : Meredith Stiehm | May 4, 1999 | 0C19/5619 | 13.12 |
| 130 | 20 | "I'll Draw You a Mapp" | Donna Deitch | Story by : David Milch & Bill Clark; Teleplay by : Leonard Gardner | May 11, 1999 | 0C20/5620 | 13.83 |
| 131 | 21 | "Voir Dire This" | Paris Barclay | Story by : Bill Clark & Bernadette McNamara; Teleplay by : Bernadette McNamara | May 18, 1999 | 0C21/5621 | 15.01 |
| 132 | 22 | "Safe Home" | Mark Tinker | Story by : David Milch & Bill Clark; Teleplay by : David Milch | May 25, 1999 | 0C22/5622 | 20.23 |

=== Season 7 (2000) ===
| No. overall | No. in season | Title | Directed by | Written by | Original release date | Prod. code | U.S. viewers (millions) |
|---|---|---|---|---|---|---|---|
| 133 | 1 | "Loogie Nights" | Mark Tinker | Story by : David Milch & Bill Clark; Teleplay by : Matt Olmstead | January 11, 2000 | 0E01/5701 | 19.13 |
| 134 | 2 | "A Hole in Juan" | Steven DePaul | Story by : David Milch & Bill Clark; Teleplay by : Jody Worth | January 18, 2000 | 0E02/5702 | 16.87 |
| 135 | 3 | "The Man With Two Right Shoes" | Mark Tinker | Story by : David Milch & Bill Clark; Teleplay by : Meredith Stiehm | January 25, 2000 | 0E03/5703 | 17.90 |
| 136 | 4 | "The Naked Are the Dead" | Bob Doherty | Story by : David Milch & Bill Clark; Teleplay by : Leonard Gardner | February 1, 2000 | 0E04/5704 | 16.72 |
| 137 | 5 | "These Shoots Are Made for Joaquin" | Jeff McCracken | Story by : Bill Clark & Lee Hubbard; Teleplay by : Lee Hubbard | February 8, 2000 | 0E05/5705 | 13.85 |
| 138 | 6 | "Brothers Under Arms" | Jake Paltrow | Story by : David Milch & Bill Clark; Teleplay by : Matt Olmstead | February 15, 2000 | 0E06/5706 | 14.35 |
| 139 | 7 | "Along Came Jones" | Farrel Jane Levy | Story by : David Milch & Bill Clark; Teleplay by : Jody Worth | February 22, 2000 | 0E07/5707 | 15.91 |
| 140 | 8 | "Everybody Plays the Mule" | Mark Tinker | Story by : David Milch & Bill Clark; Teleplay by : Meredith Stiehm | February 23, 2000 | 0E08/5708 | 12.40 |
| 141 | 9 | "Jackass" | Steven DePaul | Story by : David Milch & Bill Clark; Teleplay by : Matt Olmstead | February 29, 2000 | 0E09/5709 | 15.38 |
| 142 | 10 | "Who Murders Sleep" | Karen Gaviola | Story by : David Milch & Bill Clark & W.K. Scott Meyer; Teleplay by : W.K. Scott Meyer | March 7, 2000 | 0E10/5710 | 15.50 |
| 143 | 11 | "Little Abner" | Bob Doherty | Story by : David Milch & Bill Clark; Teleplay by : Jody Worth | March 14, 2000 | 0E11/5711 | 15.10 |
| 144 | 12 | "Welcome to New York" | Peter Markle | Story by : David Milch & Bill Clark; Teleplay by : Meredith Stiehm | March 21, 2000 | 0E12/5712 | 15.14 |
| 145 | 13 | "The Irvin Files" | Dennis M. White | Story by : David Milch & Bill Clark; Teleplay by : Leonard Gardner | March 28, 2000 | 0E13/5713 | 15.16 |
| 146 | 14 | "Sleep Over" | Matthew Penn | Story by : David Milch & Bill Clark; Teleplay by : Matt Olmstead | April 4, 2000 | 0E14/5714 | 15.48 |
| 147 | 15 | "Stressed for Success" | Donna Deitch | Story by : David Milch & Bill Clark; Teleplay by : Kim Newton | April 11, 2000 | 0E15/5715 | 15.56 |
| 148 | 16 | "Goodbye Charlie" | Mark Tinker | Story by : David Milch & Bill Clark; Teleplay by : Jody Worth | April 18, 2000 | 0E16/5716 | 15.24 |
| 149 | 17 | "Roll Out the Barrel" | James McDaniel | Story by : David Milch & Bill Clark; Teleplay by : Matt Olmstead | April 25, 2000 | 0E17/5717 | 13.10 |
| 150 | 18 | "Lucky Luciano" | Clark Johnson | Story by : David Milch & Bill Clark; Teleplay by : Hugh Levick | May 2, 2000 | 0E18/5718 | 15.79 |
| 151 | 19 | "Tea and Sympathy" | Joe Ann Fogle | Story by : David Milch & Bill Clark; Teleplay by : Ami Canaan Mann | May 9, 2000 | 0E19/5719 | 14.11 |
| 152 | 20 | "This Old Spouse" | Bob Doherty | Story by : David Milch & Bill Clark & Ted Shuttleworth; Teleplay by : Ted Shuttleworth | May 16, 2000 | 0E20/5720 | 14.02 |
| 153 | 21 | "Bats Off to Larry" | Steven DePaul | Story by : David Milch & Bill Clark; Teleplay by : Leonard Gardner | May 23, 2000 | 0E21/5721 | 16.69 |
| 154 | 22 | "The Last Round Up" | Mark Tinker | Story by : David Milch & Bill Clark; Teleplay by : David Milch | May 23, 2000 | 0E22/5722 | 16.69 |

=== Season 8 (2001) ===
| No. overall | No. in season | Title | Directed by | Written by | Original release date | Prod. code | U.S. viewers (millions) |
|---|---|---|---|---|---|---|---|
| 155 | 1 | "Daveless in New York" | Mark Tinker | Teleplay by : Matt Olmstead & Jody Worth; Story by : Bill Clark & Jody Worth & Matt Olmstead | January 9, 2001 | EA01/5801 | 16.41 |
| 156 | 2 | "Waking Up Is Hard to Do" | Steven DePaul | Story by : Bill Clark & Jody Worth; Teleplay by : Jody Worth | January 16, 2001 | EA02/5802 | 14.12 |
| 157 | 3 | "Franco, My Dear, I Don’t Give a Damn" | Mark Tinker | Story by : Bill Clark & Matt Olmstead; Teleplay by : Matt Olmstead | January 23, 2001 | EA03/5803 | 15.16 |
| 158 | 4 | "Family Ties" | Bob Doherty | Story by : Bill Clark & Buzz Bissinger; Teleplay by : Buzz Bissinger | January 30, 2001 | EA04/5804 | 14.00 |
| 159 | 5 | "Fools Russian" | Farrel Jane Levy | Story by : Bill Clark & Jonathan Lisco; Teleplay by : Jonathan Lisco | February 6, 2001 | EA05/5805 | 13.76 |
| 160 | 6 | "Writing Wrongs" | Steven DePaul | Teleplay by : Alexandra Cunningham; Story by : Bill Clark & T.J. English and Steven Bochco | February 13, 2001 | EA06/5806 | 14.12 |
| 161 | 7 | "In-Laws, Outlaws" | Jake Paltrow | Teleplay by : Buzz Bissinger & Jonathan Lisco; Story by : Bill Clark & T.J. English and Steven Bochco | February 20, 2001 | EA07/5807 | 12.68 |
| 162 | 8 | "Russellmania" | Karen Gaviola | Story by : Bill Clark & Jody Worth; Teleplay by : Jody Worth | February 27, 2001 | EA08/5808 | 11.62 |
| 163 | 9 | "Oh, Golly Goth" | Mark Tinker | Story by : Bill Clark & Matt Olmstead; Teleplay by : Matt Olmstead | March 6, 2001 | EA09/5809 | 13.69 |
| 164 | 10 | "In the Still of the Night" | Bob Doherty | Story by : Bill Clark & Alexandra Cunningham; Teleplay by : Alexandra Cunningham | March 13, 2001 | EA10/5810 | 14.30 |
| 165 | 11 | "Peeping Tommy" | Michael Watkins | Teleplay by : Victor Bumbalo and Matt Olmstead & Nicholas Wootton; Story by : Bill Clark & Victor Bumbalo | March 20, 2001 | EA11/5811 | 13.32 |
| 166 | 12 | "Thumb Enchanted Evening" | John Tracy | Story by : Bill Clark & Buzz Bissinger; Teleplay by : Buzz Bissinger | March 27, 2001 | EA12/5812 | 14.84 |
| 167 | 13 | "Flight of Fancy" | Kevin Hooks | Story by : Bill Clark & Jonathan Lisco; Teleplay by : Jonathan Lisco | April 3, 2001 | EA13/5813 | 16.63 |
| 168 | 14 | "Nariz a Nariz" | Steven DePaul | Story by : Bill Clark & Jody Worth; Teleplay by : Jody Worth | April 10, 2001 | EA14/5814 | 14.21 |
| 169 | 15 | "Love Hurts" | Rick Wallace | Story by : Bill Clark & Harold Sylvester; Teleplay by : Harold Sylvester | April 17, 2001 | EA15/5815 | 14.03 |
| 170 | 16 | "Everyone Into the Poole" | Mark Tinker | Story by : Bill Clark & Nicholas Wootton; Teleplay by : Nicholas Wootton | April 24, 2001 | EA16/5816 | 14.17 |
| 171 | 17 | "Dying to Testify" | Dennis M. White | Story by : Bill Clark & Matt Olmstead; Teleplay by : Matt Olmstead | May 1, 2001 | EA17/5817 | 13.54 |
| 172 | 18 | "Lost Time" | Bob Doherty | Story by : Bill Clark & Buzz Bissinger; Teleplay by : Buzz Bissinger | May 8, 2001 | EA18/5818 | 14.68 |
| 173 | 19 | "Under Covers" | Donna Deitch | Story by : Bill Clark & Alexandra Cunningham; Teleplay by : Alexandra Cunningham | May 15, 2001 | EA19/5819 | 12.93 |
| 174 | 20 | "In the Wind" | Mark Tinker | Teleplay by : Jonathan Lisco; Story by : Steven Bochco & Bill Clark & Jonathan Lisco | May 22, 2001 | EA20/5820 | 15.12 |

=== Season 9 (2001–02) ===
| No. overall | No. in season | Title | Directed by | Written by | Original release date | Prod. code | U.S. viewers (millions) |
|---|---|---|---|---|---|---|---|
| 175 | 1 | "Lie Like a Rug: Part 1" | Mark Tinker | Teleplay by : Matt Olmstead; Story by : Steven Bochco & Bill Clark & Matt Olmstead | November 6, 2001 | GA01/5901 | 15.81 |
| 176 | 2 | "Johnny Got His Gold: Part 2" | Mark Piznarski | Teleplay by : Nicholas Wootton; Story by : Steven Bochco & Bill Clark & Nicholas Wootton | November 6, 2001 | GA02/5902 | 15.81 |
| 177 | 3 | "Two Clarks in a Bar" | Henry J. Bronchtein | Story by : Bill Clark & Jody Worth; Teleplay by : Jody Worth | November 13, 2001 | GA03/5903 | 13.13 |
| 178 | 4 | "Hit the Road, Clark" | Jake Paltrow | Story by : Bill Clark & Elizabeth Sarnoff; Teleplay by : Elizabeth Sarnoff | November 20, 2001 | GA04/5904 | 12.87 |
| 179 | 5 | "Cops and Robber" | Mark Tinker | Story by : Bill Clark & Harold Sylvester; Teleplay by : Harold Sylvester | November 27, 2001 | GA05/5905 | 13.56 |
| 180 | 6 | "Baby Love" | Donna Deitch | Story by : Bill Clark & Matt Olmstead; Teleplay by : Matt Olmstead | December 4, 2001 | GA06/5906 | 14.87 |
| 181 | 7 | "Mom’s Away" | Steven DePaul | Story by : Bill Clark & Nicholas Wootton; Teleplay by : Nicholas Wootton | December 11, 2001 | GA07/5907 | 13.56 |
| 182 | 8 | "Puppy Love" | Dick Lowry | Story by : Bill Clark & Jody Worth; Teleplay by : Jody Worth | December 18, 2001 | GA08/5908 | 13.76 |
| 183 | 9 | "Here Comes the Son" | Charles Haid | Story by : Bill Clark & Jonathan Robert Kaplan; Teleplay by : Jonathan Robert Kaplan | January 8, 2002 | GA09/5909 | 12.18 |
| 184 | 10 | "Jealous Hearts" | Bob Doherty | Story by : Bill Clark & Matt Olmstead; Teleplay by : Matt Olmstead & Nicholas Wootton | January 15, 2002 | GA10/5910 | 12.49 |
| 185 | 11 | "Humpty Dumped" | Dianne Houston | Story by : Bill Clark & Nicholas Wootton; Teleplay by : Nicholas Wootton & Matt Olmstead | February 5, 2002 | GA11/5911 | 12.69 |
| 186 | 12 | "Oh, Mama" | Peter Markle | Story by : Bill Clark & Jody Worth; Teleplay by : Jody Worth | February 19, 2002 | GA12/5912 | 10.40 |
| 187 | 13 | "Safari, So Good" | Mark Piznarski | Story by : Bill Clark & Matt Olmstead; Teleplay by : Matt Olmstead & Nicholas Wootton | February 26, 2002 | GA13/5913 | 12.05 |
| 188 | 14 | "Hand Job" | Tawnia McKiernan | Story by : Bill Clark & Matt Olmstead; Teleplay by : Matt Olmstead | March 5, 2002 | GA14/5914 | 11.60 |
| 189 | 15 | "Guns & Hoses" | Craig Zisk | Story by : Bill Clark & Nicholas Wootton; Teleplay by : Nicholas Wootton | March 12, 2002 | GA15/5915 | 11.99 |
| 190 | 16 | "A Little Dad’ll Do Ya" | Steven DePaul | Story by : Bill Clark & Jody Worth; Teleplay by : Jody Worth | March 19, 2002 | GA16/5916 | 12.34 |
| 191 | 17 | "Gypsy Woe’s Me" | Mark Tinker | Story by : Bill Clark & Nicholas Wootton; Teleplay by : Nicholas Wootton & Matt Olmstead | March 26, 2002 | GA17/5917 | 11.05 |
| 192 | 18 | "Less Is Morte" | Matthew Penn | Story by : Bill Clark & Stephen Adly Guirgis; Teleplay by : Stephen Adly Guirgis | April 16, 2002 | GA18/5918 | 11.45 |
| 193 | 19 | "Low Blow" | Mark Tinker | Story by : Bill Clark & Nicholas Wootton; Teleplay by : Nicholas Wootton | April 30, 2002 | GA19/5919 | 10.54 |
| 194 | 20 | "Oedipus Wrecked" | Nelson McCormick | Story by : Bill Clark & Matt Olmstead; Teleplay by : Matt Olmstead | May 7, 2002 | GA20/5920 | 12.39 |
| 195 | 21 | "Dead Meat in New Deli" | Jake Paltrow | Story by : Bill Clark & Jody Worth; Teleplay by : Jody Worth | May 14, 2002 | GA21/5921 | 11.86 |
| 196 | 22 | "Better Laid Than Never: Parts 1 & 2" | Mark Tinker | Teleplay by : Matt Olmstead & Nicholas Wootton; Story by : Bill Clark & Nicholas Wootton & Matt Olmstead | May 21, 2002 | GA22A/5922A | 12.94 |
| 197 | 23 | "Better Laid Than Never: Parts 1 & 2" | Mark Tinker | Teleplay by : Matt Olmstead & Nicholas Wootton; Story by : Bill Clark & Nicholas Wootton & Matt Olmstead | May 21, 2002 | GA22B/5922B | 12.94 |

=== Season 10 (2002–03) ===
| No. overall | No. in season | Title | Directed by | Written by | Original release date | Prod. code | U.S. viewers (millions) |
|---|---|---|---|---|---|---|---|
| 198 | 1 | "Ho Down" | Mark Tinker | Story by : Bill Clark & Nicholas Wootton; Teleplay by : Nicholas Wootton | September 24, 2002 | HA01/5101 | 13.17 |
| 199 | 2 | "You’ve Got Mail" | Mark Piznarski | Story by : Bill Clark & Matt Olmstead; Teleplay by : Matt Olmstead | October 1, 2002 | HA02/5102 | 12.69 |
| 200 | 3 | "One in the Nuts" | Michael Switzer | Story by : Bill Clark & Jody Worth; Teleplay by : Jody Worth | October 8, 2002 | HA03/5103 | 13.04 |
| 201 | 4 | "Meat Me in the Park" | Jesse Bochco | Greg Plageman | October 15, 2002 | HA04/5104 | 12.99 |
| 202 | 5 | "Death by Cycle" | Jake Paltrow | Story by : Bill Clark & Keith Eisner; Teleplay by : Keith Eisner | October 22, 2002 | HA06/5106 | 14.17 |
| 203 | 6 | "Maya Con Dios" | Mark Tinker | Story by : Bill Clark & Tom Szentgyörgyi; Teleplay by : Tom Szentgyörgyi | October 29, 2002 | HA05/5105 | 14.62 |
| 204 | 7 | "Das Boots" | Mark Tinker | Story by : Bill Clark & Greg Plageman; Teleplay by : Greg Plageman | November 12, 2002 | HA07/5107 | 12.06 |
| 205 | 8 | "Below the Belt" | Mark Piznarski | Story by : Bill Clark & Nicholas Wootton; Teleplay by : Nicholas Wootton | November 19, 2002 | HA08/5108 | 12.05 |
| 206 | 9 | "Half-Ashed" | Steven DePaul | Story by : Bill Clark & Matt Olmstead; Teleplay by : Matt Olmstead | November 26, 2002 | HA09/5109 | 12.42 |
| 207 | 10 | "Healthy McDowell Movement" | Tawnia McKiernan | Story by : Bill Clark & Jody Worth; Teleplay by : Jody Worth and Nicholas Wootton & Matt Olmstead | December 10, 2002 | HA10/5110 | 12.29 |
| 208 | 11 | "I Kid You Not" | Joe Ann Fogle | Story by : Bill Clark & Tom Szentgyörgyi; Teleplay by : Tom Szentgyörgyi | January 7, 2003 | HA11/5111 | 11.67 |
| 209 | 12 | "Arrested Development" | Jesse Bochco | Story by : Bill Clark & Keith Eisner; Teleplay by : Keith Eisner | January 14, 2003 | HA12/5112 | 11.86 |
| 210 | 13 | "Bottoms Up" | Donna Deitch | Story by : Bill Clark & Greg Plageman; Teleplay by : Greg Plageman | February 4, 2003 | HA13/5113 | 11.03 |
| 211 | 14 | "Laughlin All the Way to the Clink" | JoAnne McCool | Story by : Bill Clark & Sonny Postiglione; Teleplay by : Sonny Postiglione | February 11, 2003 | HA14/5114 | 10.95 |
| 212 | 15 | "Tranny Get Your Gun" | Rick Wallace | Story by : Bill Clark & Eric Rogers; Teleplay by : Eric Rogers | February 18, 2003 | HA15/5115 | 11.71 |
| 213 | 16 | "Nude Awakening" | Mark Tinker | Story by : Bill Clark & Matt Olmstead; Teleplay by : Matt Olmstead | February 25, 2003 | HA16/5116 | 11.59 |
| 214 | 17 | "Off the Wall" | John Hyams | Story by : Bill Clark & Nicholas Wootton; Teleplay by : Nicholas Wootton | April 8, 2003 | HA17/5117 | 10.88 |
| 215 | 18 | "Marine Life" | Matthew Penn | Story by : Bill Clark & Jody Worth; Teleplay by : Jody Worth | April 15, 2003 | HA18/5118 | 10.70 |
| 216 | 19 | "Meet the Grandparents" | Jake Paltrow | Story by : Bill Clark & Greg Plageman; Teleplay by : Greg Plageman | April 29, 2003 | HA19/5119 | 11.42 |
| 217 | 20 | "Maybe Baby" | Bob Doherty | Story by : Bill Clark & Keith Eisner; Teleplay by : Keith Eisner | May 6, 2003 | HA20/5120 | 11.56 |
| 218 | 21 | "Yo, Adrian" | Carol Banker | Story by : Bill Clark & Tom Szentgyörgyi; Teleplay by : Tom Szentgyörgyi | May 13, 2003 | HA21/5121 | 11.77 |
| 219 | 22 | "22 Skidoo" | Mark Tinker | Story by : Bill Clark & Matt Olmstead; Teleplay by : Matt Olmstead | May 20, 2003 | HA22/5122 | 12.46 |

=== Season 11 (2003–04) ===
| No. overall | No. in season | Title | Directed by | Written by | Original release date | Prod. code | U.S. viewers (millions) |
|---|---|---|---|---|---|---|---|
| 220 | 1 | "Frickin’ Fraker" | Mark Tinker | Story by : Bill Clark & Keith Eisner; Teleplay by : Keith Eisner | September 23, 2003 | IA01/5101 | 10.24 |
| 221 | 2 | "Your Bus, Ted" | Mark Piznarski | Story by : Bill Clark & Tom Szentgyörgyi; Teleplay by : Tom Szentgyörgyi | September 30, 2003 | IA02/5102 | 10.43 |
| 222 | 3 | "Shear Stupidity" | Tawnia McKiernan | Story by : Bill Clark & Bonnie Mark; Teleplay by : Bonnie Mark | October 7, 2003 | IA03/5103 | 9.29 |
| 223 | 4 | "Porn Free" | Dennis Dugan | Story by : Bill Clark & Greg Plageman; Teleplay by : Greg Plageman | October 14, 2003 | IA04/5104 | 9.76 |
| 224 | 5 | "Keeping Abreast" | Jesse Bochco | Story by : Bill Clark & Matt Olmstead; Teleplay by : Matt Olmstead | October 21, 2003 | IA05/5105 | 10.86 |
| 225 | 6 | "Andy Appleseed" | Jake Paltrow | Story by : Bill Clark & Nicholas Wootton; Teleplay by : Nicholas Wootton | October 28, 2003 | IA06/5106 | 10.93 |
| 226 | 7 | "It’s to Die For" | Ed Begley, Jr. | Story by : Bill Clark & Keith Eisner; Teleplay by : Keith Eisner | November 4, 2003 | IA07/5107 | 10.69 |
| 227 | 8 | "And the Wenner Is..." | Paul Eads | Story by : Bill Clark & Tom Szentgyörgyi; Teleplay by : Tom Szentgyörgyi | November 18, 2003 | IA08/5108 | 9.88 |
| 228 | 9 | "Only Schmucks Pay Income Tax" | Donna Deitch | Story by : Bill Clark & William Finkelstein; Teleplay by : William Finkelstein | November 25, 2003 | IA09/5109 | 10.17 |
| 229 | 10 | "You Da Bomb" | John Hyams | Story by : Bill Clark and Matt Olmstead & Nicholas Wootton; Teleplay by : Matt Olmstead & Nicholas Wootton | February 10, 2004 | IA10/5110 | 11.11 |
| 230 | 11 | "Passing the Stone" | Carol Banker | Story by : Bill Clark & Bonnie Mark; Teleplay by : Bonnie Mark | February 17, 2004 | IA11/5111 | 9.42 |
| 231 | 12 | "Chatty Chatty, Bang Bang" | Mark Tinker | Story by : Bill Clark & Greg Plageman; Teleplay by : Greg Plageman | March 2, 2004 | IA12/5112 | 9.26 |
| 232 | 13 | "Take My Wife, Please" | Dennis Dugan | Story by : Bill Clark & Keith Eisner; Teleplay by : Keith Eisner | March 9, 2004 | IA13/5113 | 10.38 |
| 233 | 14 | "Colonel Knowledge" | Steven DePaul | Story by : Bill Clark & Tom Szentgyörgyi; Teleplay by : Tom Szentgyörgyi | March 16, 2004 | IA14/5114 | 9.59 |
| 234 | 15 | "Old Yeller" | Mark Tinker | Story by : Bill Clark & Nicholas Wootton; Teleplay by : Nicholas Wootton | March 23, 2004 | IA15/5115 | 9.69 |
| 235 | 16 | "On the Fence" | Bob Doherty | Story by : Bill Clark & Matt Olmstead; Teleplay by : Matt Olmstead | March 30, 2004 | IA16/5116 | 9.15 |
| 236 | 17 | "In Goddess We Trussed" | Kevin Hooks | Story by : Bill Clark & Greg Plageman; Teleplay by : Greg Plageman | April 6, 2004 | IA17/5117 | 8.93 |
| 237 | 18 | "The Brothers Grim" | Rick Wallace | Story by : Bill Clark & Keith Eisner; Teleplay by : Keith Eisner | April 13, 2004 | IA18/5118 | 9.78 |
| 238 | 19 | "Peeler? I Hardly Knew Her" | Jesse Bochco | Story by : Bill Clark & Tom Szentgyörgyi; Teleplay by : Tom Szentgyörgyi | April 20, 2004 | IA19/5119 | 10.20 |
| 239 | 20 | "Traylor Trash" | Mark Tinker | Story by : Bill Clark & Matt Olmstead; Teleplay by : Matt Olmstead | April 27, 2004 | IA20/5120 | 9.89 |
| 240 | 21 | "What’s Your Poison?" | Jesse Bochco | Story by : Bill Clark & Nicholas Wootton; Teleplay by : Nicholas Wootton | May 4, 2004 | IA21/5121 | 9.57 |
| 241 | 22 | "Who’s Your Daddy?" | Mark Tinker | Story by : Bill Clark and Nicholas Wootton & Matt Olmstead; Teleplay by : Nicholas Wootton & Matt Olmstea | May 11, 2004 | IA22/5122 | 9.12 |

=== Season 12 (2004–05) ===
| No. overall | No. in season | Title | Directed by | Written by | Original release date | Prod. code | U.S. viewers (millions) |
|---|---|---|---|---|---|---|---|
| 242 | 1 | "Dress for Success" | Jesse Bochco | Story by : Bill Clark & Matt Olmstead; Teleplay by : Matt Olmstead | September 21, 2004 | JB01/1201 | 9.68 |
| 243 | 2 | "Fish Out of Water" | Jesse Bochco | Story by : Bill Clark & Nicholas Wootton; Teleplay by : Nicholas Wootton | September 28, 2004 | JB01/1202 | 9.73 |
| 244 | 3 | "Great Balls of Ire" | Mark Tinker | Story by : Bill Clark & Tom Szentgyörgyi; Teleplay by : Tom Szentgyörgyi | October 12, 2004 | JB01/1203 | 8.72 |
| 245 | 4 | "Divorce Detective Style" | Mark Tinker | Story by : Bill Clark & Keith Eisner; Teleplay by : Keith Eisner | October 19, 2004 | JB01/1204 | 8.43 |
| 246 | 5 | "You’re Buggin’ Me" | John Hyams | Story by : Bill Clark & Greg Plageman; Teleplay by : Greg Plageman | October 26, 2004 | JB01/1205 | 9.27 |
| 247 | 6 | "The Vision Thing" | Tawnia McKiernan | Story by : Bill Clark & William Finkelstein; Teleplay by : William Finkelstein | November 9, 2004 | JB01/1206 | 10.76 |
| 248 | 7 | "My Dinner With Andy" | Kevin Hooks | Story by : Bill Clark & Tom Szentgyörgyi; Teleplay by : Tom Szentgyörgyi | November 16, 2004 | JB01/1207 | 9.05 |
| 249 | 8 | "I Like Ike" | Jesse Bochco | Story by : Bill Clark & Keith Eisner; Teleplay by : Keith Eisner | November 23, 2004 | JB01/1208 | 10.22 |
| 250 | 9 | "The 3-H Club" | Mark Tinker | Story by : Bill Clark, Greg Ball & Steve Blackman; Teleplay by : Greg Ball & Steve Blackman | November 30, 2004 | JB01/1209 | 9.52 |
| 251 | 10 | "The Dead Donald" | Carol Banker | Story by : Bill Clark & Tom Szentgyörgyi; Teleplay by : Tom Szentgyörgyi | December 7, 2004 | JB01/1210 | 9.81 |
| 252 | 11 | "Bale Out" | Jake Paltrow | Story by : Bill Clark & Keith Eisner; Teleplay by : Keith Eisner | December 14, 2004 | JB01/1211 | 10.32 |
| 253 | 12 | "I Love My Wives, But Oh You Kid" | Alan Rosenberg | Story by : Bill Clark & William Finkelstein; Teleplay by : William Finkelstein | December 21, 2004 | JB01/1212 | 10.38 |
| 254 | 13 | "Stoli With a Twist" | Jesse Bochco | Story by : Bill Clark & Tom Szentgyörgyi; Teleplay by : Tom Szentgyörgyi | January 11, 2005 | JB01/1213 | 9.61 |
| 255 | 14 | "Stratis Fear" | Bob Doherty | Story by : Bill Clark & Keith Eisner; Teleplay by : Keith Eisner | January 18, 2005 | JB01/1214 | 9.00 |
| 256 | 15 | "La Bomba" | Mark Tinker | Story by : Bill Clark & Greg Plageman; Teleplay by : Greg Plageman | January 25, 2005 | JB01/1215 | 9.41 |
| 257 | 16 | "Old Man Quiver" | Ed Begley, Jr. | Story by : Bill Clark & William Finkelstein; Teleplay by : William Finkelstein | February 1, 2005 | JB01/1216 | 10.63 |
| 258 | 17 | "Sergeant Sipowicz' Lonely Hearts Club Band" | John Hyams | Story by : Bill Clark & Tom Szentgyörgyi; Teleplay by : Tom Szentgyörgyi | February 8, 2005 | JB01/1217 | 9.74 |
| 259 | 18 | "Lenny Scissorhands" | Rick Wallace | Story by : Bill Clark & Keith Eisner; Teleplay by : Keith Eisner | February 15, 2005 | JB01/1218 | 9.78 |
| 260 | 19 | "Bale to the Chief" | Jesse Bochco | Story by : Bill Clark, Tom Szentgyörgyi & Keith Eisner; Teleplay by : Tom Szentgyörgyi & Keith Eisner | February 22, 2005 | JB01/1219 | 10.60 |
| 261 | 20 | "Moving Day" | Mark Tinker | Story by : Steven Bochco, Bill Clark & William Finkelstein; Teleplay by : William Finkelstein | March 1, 2005 | JB01/1220 | 16.08 |

== Ratings ==
NYPD Blue : U.S. viewers per episode (millions)

| Season | Episode number | | | | | | | | | | | | | | | | | | | | | | |
| Season | 1 | 2 | 3 | 4 | 5 | 6 | 7 | 8 | 9 | 10 | 11 | 12 | 13 | 14 | 15 | 16 | 17 | 18 | 19 | 20 | 21 | 22 | 23 |
|---|---|---|---|---|---|---|---|---|---|---|---|---|---|---|---|---|---|---|---|---|---|---|---|
| 1 | 22.8 | 20.3 | 21.0 | 21.2 | 19.6 | 22.2 | 19.7 | 19.8 | 18.5 | 17.5 | 19.0 | 20.7 | 20.5 | 21.7 | 23.5 | 17.8 | 22.2 | 19.9 | 21.2 | 19.0 | 22.8 | 23.2 | – |
| 2 | 24.3 | 22.1 | 24.7 | 28.8 | 25.7 | 25.6 | 26.5 | 27.4 | 24.8 | 25.2 | 24.6 | 23.9 | 23.3 | 25.0 | 22.8 | 23.5 | 23.6 | 24.0 | 20.2 | 22.2 | 20.8 | 25.0 | – |
| 3 | 24.7 | 21.9 | 21.2 | 21.0 | 22.7 | 21.9 | 20.1 | 20.6 | 21.5 | 20.8 | 19.8 | 20.1 | 19.1 | 20.2 | 18.8 | 18.1 | 18.0 | 19.7 | 17.7 | 20.9 | 19.8 | 18.8 | – |
| 4 | 21.57 | 19.40 | 20.38 | 18.93 | 17.82 | 19.25 | 18.50 | 17.82 | 17.81 | 17.80 | 19.60 | 18.89 | 18.56 | 18.29 | 17.22 | 17.62 | 17.83 | 15.88 | 16.99 | 15.16 | 15.56 | 17.26 | – |
| 5 | 18.07 | 18.64 | 18.27 | 15.32 | 17.47 | 16.44 | 15.13 | 15.69 | 18.25 | 15.59 | 16.20 | 16.97 | 13.17 | 15.08 | 16.62 | 16.10 | 15.71 | 15.27 | 14.41 | 14.35 | 14.75 | 15.24 | – |
| 6 | 15.66 | 15.98 | 16.10 | 16.86 | 22.10 | 18.74 | 17.77 | 18.09 | 15.34 | 16.30 | 14.50 | 14.88 | 14.42 | 14.23 | 13.56 | 13.53 | 11.46 | 15.34 | 13.12 | 13.83 | 15.01 | 20.23 | – |
| 7 | 19.13 | 16.87 | 17.90 | 16.72 | 13.85 | 14.35 | 15.91 | 12.40 | 15.38 | 15.50 | 15.10 | 15.14 | 15.16 | 15.48 | 15.56 | 15.24 | 13.10 | 15.79 | 14.11 | 14.02 | 16.69 | 16.69 | – |
| 8 | 16.41 | 14.12 | 15.16 | 14.00 | 13.76 | 14.12 | 12.68 | 11.62 | 13.69 | 14.30 | 13.32 | 14.84 | 16.63 | 14.21 | 14.03 | 14.17 | 13.54 | 14.68 | 12.93 | 15.12 | – | | |
| 9 | 15.81 | 15.81 | 13.13 | 12.87 | 13.56 | 14.87 | 13.60 | 13.80 | 12.18 | 12.49 | 12.69 | 10.40 | 12.05 | 11.60 | 11.99 | 12.34 | 11.05 | 11.45 | 10.54 | 12.39 | 11.86 | 12.94 | 12.94 |
| 10 | 13.17 | 12.69 | 13.04 | 12.99 | 14.17 | 14.62 | 12.06 | 12.05 | 12.42 | 12.29 | 11.67 | 11.86 | 11.03 | 10.95 | 11.71 | 11.59 | 10.88 | 10.70 | 11.42 | 11.56 | 11.77 | 12.46 | – |
| 11 | 10.24 | 10.43 | 9.29 | 9.76 | 10.86 | 10.93 | 10.69 | 9.88 | 10.17 | 11.11 | 9.42 | 9.26 | 10.38 | 9.59 | 9.69 | 9.15 | 8.93 | 9.78 | 10.20 | 9.89 | 9.57 | 9.12 | – |
| 12 | 9.68 | 9.73 | 8.72 | 8.43 | 9.27 | 10.76 | 9.05 | 10.22 | 9.52 | 9.81 | 10.32 | 10.38 | 9.61 | 9.00 | 9.41 | 10.63 | 9.74 | 9.78 | 10.60 | 16.08 | – | | |

Audience measurement performed by Nielsen Media Research

== Home video releases ==
| Season | Episodes | DVD release dates | | | |
| Season | Episodes | Region 1 | Region 2 | Region 4 | Discs |
|---|---|---|---|---|---|
| 1 | 22 | March 18, 2003 | May 19, 2003 | June 17, 2003 | 6 |
| 2 | 22 | August 19, 2003 | October 6, 2003 | February 17, 2004 | 6 |
| 3 | 22 | February 21, 2006 | April 17, 2006 | May 29, 2006 | 4 |
| 4 | 22 | June 20, 2006 | August 14, 2006 | August 21, 2006 | 4 |
| 5 | 22 | January 21, 2014 | December 10, 2012 | TBA | 6 |
| 6 | 22 | June 24, 2014 | December 10, 2012 | TBA | 6 |
| 7 | 22 | September 30, 2014 | February 25, 2013 | TBA | 6 |
| 8 | 20 | January 13, 2015 | February 25, 2013 | TBA | 5 |
| 9 | 23 | August 5, 2016 | March 25, 2013 | TBA | 5 |
| 10 | 22 | August 23, 2016 | April 1, 2013 | TBA | 5 |
| 11 | 22 | November 15, 2016 | April 29, 2013 | TBA | 5 |
| 12 | 20 | January 17, 2017 | April 29, 2013 | TBA | 5 |
