= NYPD Blue season 6 =

Season of television series

NYPD Blue
- Season 6
- Season 6 U.S. DVD cover
- No. of episodes: 22

Release
- Original network: ABC
- Original release: October 20, 1998 – May 25, 1999

Season chronology
- ← Previous; Season 5 Next → Season 7

The sixth season of NYPD Blue premiered on ABC on October 20, 1998, and concluded on May 25, 1999.

== Cast ==
Actor	Character	Main cast	Recurring cast
Jimmy Smits	Bobby Simone	episodes 1–5	—N/a
Dennis Franz	Andy Sipowicz	entire season	—N/a
Rick Schroder	Danny Sorenson	episodes 6–22	—N/a
James McDaniel	Arthur Fancy	entire season	—N/a
Kim Delaney	Diane Russell	entire season	—N/a
Gordon Clapp	Greg Medavoy	entire season	—N/a
Nicholas Turturro	James Martinez	entire season	—N/a
Andrea Thompson	Jill Kirkendall	entire season	—N/a
Sharon Lawrence	Sylvia Costas	episodes 1–10	episodes 11–21
Bill Brochtrup	John Irvin	episodes 13–22	episodes 1, 5, 7, 9, 12

== Episodes ==
No. overall	No. in season	Title	Directed by	Written by	Original release date	Prod. code	U.S. viewers (millions)
111	1	"Top Gum"	Mark Tinker	Story by : Steven Bochco & David Milch & Bill Clark; Teleplay by : Meredith Stiehm	October 20, 1998	0C01/5601	15.66
Simone, Sipowicz, and Fancy are annoyed by the presence of retired cop Mike Roberts, who has been hired by a murder victim's father to keep a lid on his son's alleged homosexuality. Meanwhile, Costas lends a big assist to Russell and Kirkendall in their investigation of a teenage girl's rape, and Bobby Simone helps scare away the lowlife boyfriend of his dentist's daughter, but is clearly not feeling well.
112	2	"Cop in a Bottle"	Paris Barclay	Story by : Steven Bochco & David Milch & Bill Clark; Teleplay by : Matt Olmstead	October 27, 1998	0C02/5602	15.98
The detectives of the 15th Precinct investigate a double homicide involving one of their own, an alcoholic cop who seems to have done the right thing, but can't remember key details about the incident. The situation becomes more precarious as the drunk cop's strict and unlikable lieutenant tries to use the incident to get him kicked off the force. Looming over all these events is the health crisis afflicting Bobby, who collapses at the crime scene and is hospitalized with heart problems.
113	3	"Numb and Number"	Mark Tinker	Story by : Steven Bochco & David Milch & Bill Clark; Teleplay by : Leonard Gardner	November 10, 1998	0C03/5603	16.10
Sipowicz, Medavoy and Martinez try to unravel the confusing information given by the suspect in the murder of a Pakistani man, who was found semi-naked in a park. Meanwhile, Simone's deteriorating health continues to worry Russell and leads Sipowicz into conflict with everyone, including Costas.: Danny Trejo guest stars as Frankie Soto
114	4	"Brother's Keeper"	Donna Deitch	Story by : Steven Bochco & David Milch & Bill Clark; Teleplay by : Doug Palau	November 17, 1998	0C04/5604	16.86
Lieutenant Fancy urgently reaches out to the entire New York City police department for assistance in resolving Simone's critical medical condition, while his co-workers at the 15th Precinct are frustrated by their inability to help their ailing comrade. Meanwhile, Sipowicz, Medavoy and Martinez investigate what appears to be the brutal murder of a 72-year-old woman with two hugely screwed-up sons.: Mark Pellegrino guest stars as Stanley Struel; Wade Williams guest stars as Arnold Struel
115	5	"Hearts and Souls"	Paris Barclay	Story by : Steven Bochco & David Milch & Bill Clark; Teleplay by : Nicholas Wootton	November 24, 1998	0C05/5605	22.10
Sipowicz is led to a surprising reconnection with his ex-wife as Simone's medical crisis reaches the worst possible conclusion. Note: This episode exists in two versions. A 90-minute version was shown once during the original airing on ABC and is on the DVD release of Season 6. In order to fit in the show's usual 60-minute timeslot, a version was produced in which a C-plot involving Greg becoming increasingly irate when he deals with an annoying assault complainant was entirely cut, and a B-plot involving involving Andy helping his now-alcoholic ex-wife Katie was sharply cut down in length. The 60-minute version is the only one that has been rebroadcast in reruns and syndication and is the version used on streaming services such as Hulu. Notes: Last credited appearance of Jimmy Smits as Bobby Simone. He returned for one (uncredited) scene in Season 12 episode 6.; Director Paris Barclay won an Emmy and a Directors Guild of America Award for his work in this episode.; Debra Monk won an Primetime Emmy Award for Outstanding Guest Actress in a Drama Series.
116	6	"Danny Boy"	Mark Tinker	Story by : Steven Bochco & David Milch & Bill Clark; Teleplay by : Meredith Stiehm	December 1, 1998	0C06/5606	18.74
Danny Sorenson transfers from Narcotics to the 15th Precinct's detective squad. While he and Sipowicz lead a double homicide investigation, Sorenson struggles to overcome the squad's suspicion of his techniques and intentions, especially from Diane who is hostile to his existence in the wake of Bobby's death. Meanwhile, Costas has misgivings about a conviction involving a non-violent man and asks a reluctant Sipowicz for help in reviewing it. Note: First appearance of Rick Schroder as Danny Sorenson.; First episode where Dennis Franz receives top billing, which will remain for the rest of the run of the series
117	7	"Czech Bouncer"	Paris Barclay	Story by : David Milch & Bill Clark; Teleplay by : Matt Olmstead	December 8, 1998	0C07/5607	17.77
Sipowicz mentors Sorenson when the latter goes overboard with a suspect in the killing of two elderly gift shop owners; Russell and Kirkendall investigate the murder of a strip club patron and are shocked to learn that PAA Dolores Mayo is working there as a dancer; and Andy gets some info from Sgt. Dornan but it's too late to help Sylvia or an innocent man in jail.: Mos Def guest stars as Leslie Peach.
118	8	"Raging Bulls"	Steven DePaul	Story by : Steven Bochco & David Milch & Bill Clark; Teleplay by : Leonard Gardner	December 15, 1998	0C08/5608	18.09
An off duty white officer mistakenly shoots a black undercover officer when seeing suspects in pursuit of a crime. The white officer, Syzmanski, is the same officer who pulled over Lt. Fancy for driving in an all White neighborhood, leading to a violent explosion of racial tension between Sipowicz and Fancy. Diane and Jill help out an increasingly troubled Dolores Mayo. Andy consoles a distraught Sylvia.: Kevin Dillon guest stars as Officer Neil Baker.
119	9	"Grime Scene"	Michael M. Robin	Story by : David Milch & Bill Clark; Teleplay by : Doug Palau & Nicholas Wootton	January 5, 1999	0C09/5609	15.34
Russell and Sorenson scramble to close a stabbing case so that Kirkendall's son, a witness to the incident, doesn't have to testify; Greg and James slog through a case where a homeless man was beaten to death; PAA John tries to help out an increasingly out of control Dolores Mayo; Andy, Sylvia and Sgt. Dornan join forces to avenge a man who was conned into confessing to a crime, tortured in jail and murdered there; and Russell is tempted to drink.
120	10	"Show and Tell"	Marc Buckland	Story by : David Milch & Bill Clark; Teleplay by : Matt Olmstead	January 12, 1999	0C10/5610	16.30
Sipowicz and Sorenson are beyond frustrated when the FBI and Internal Affairs show up and meddle with their investigation of a family of dirty cops who may have been involved in a robbery-homicide. Meanwhile, Medavoy chafes at being the butt of one of Sipowicz's jokes; Sylvia reaches the end of her rope on the Suarez case; and Diane, still consumed with grief, reaches out for help.: Chad Allen guest stars as Tommy Ibarra
121	11	"Big Bang Theory"	Jake Paltrow	Story by : David Milch & Bill Clark; Teleplay by : Ted Mann	February 9, 1999	0C11/5611	14.50
An apartment building gigolo (Carlos Gómez) is the prime suspect when one of the elderly ladies he "visited" is murdered; and Sorenson turns to Sipowicz for advice when his best friend from their Army days appears to be on the brink of a breakdown.: D.B. Sweeney guest stars as Joey Dwyer and Caroline Aaron as Doris Steinman.
122	12	"What's Up, Chuck?"	Bob Doherty	Story by : David Milch & Bill Clark; Teleplay by : John Chambers	February 16, 1999	0C12/5612	14.88
"Upstairs" John fears that Dolores' downward spiral might have ended tragically, and when Sipowicz and Sorenson investigate her disappearance, they face off with a high profile attorney from Sipowicz's past. Elsewhere, a dysfunctional family leads Greg and James into a bizarre murder case, and Jill and Diane get an even weirder case that could be a murder case, a kidnapping case, or no case at all.: Terrence Howard guest stars as A.J. Foreman.
123	13	"Dead Girl Walking"	Paris Barclay	Story by : David Milch & Bill Clark; Teleplay by : Leonard Gardner	February 23, 1999	0C13/5613	14.42
A girl thought to be dead really isn't, in spite of her mother's positive (and eager for compensation) identification. Meanwhile, a member of the 15th Precinct takes a bullet as a stakeout suddenly turns violent; Andy and Lt. Fancy try to help Det. Dornan, who is bitter for being demoted, even as his attitude sucks; and Henry Coffield surprisingly provides a smile to Diane's day.
124	14	"Raphael's Inferno"	Matthew Penn	Story by : David Milch & Bill Clark; Teleplay by : Doug Palau	March 2, 1999	0C14/5614	14.23
A young girl is found dead in the basement of her apartment and Sipowicz and Sorenson rely on their instincts to narrow the list of suspects; an elderly gentleman suspects that his younger girlfriend was forced to steal money from him but Greg and James find out the "girlfriend" was hiding a secret; and Sorenson's sister and Dolores Mayo's father visit the precinct, hoping to spend time with their loved ones.: Robert Glaudini guest stars as Jimmy Mayo. He is the father of the actress (Lola Glaudini) that plays Dolores Mayo.
125	15	"I Have a Dream"	Marc Buckland	Story by : David Milch & Bill Clark; Teleplay by : Nicholas Wootton	April 6, 1999	0C15/5615	13.56
Sorenson's acquaintance with a drug dealer proves helpful when a cop is accused of prematurely shooting a suspect; Russell and Kirkendall fear that a bitter neighborly dispute could get out of hand; and Sipowicz has a recurring dream about his past which helps him come to terms with his present.: Kevin Dillon guest stars as Officer Neil Baker.
126	16	"Tain't Misbehavin'"	Karen Gaviola	Story by : David Milch & Bill Clark; Teleplay by : Matt Olmstead	April 13, 1999	0C16/5616	13.53
Sorenson and his girlfriend, Nadine, experience an emotional crisis; and Sipowicz gives a convincing performance as a heavy in order to secure a murder confession.: Ray McKinnon guest stars as Ted.
127	17	"Don't Meth With Me"	Steven DePaul	Story by : David Milch & Bill Clark; Teleplay by : Jody Worth	April 20, 1999	0C17/5617	11.46
Sipowicz and Sorenson investigate the death of a woman whose spoiled, drug-using son is a prime suspect; and disgraced retired cop Mike Roberts needs help from his former colleagues when it appears that he may be responsible for a crime at his current job.: Allan Arbus guests as attorney Seymour Epstein.
128	18	"Mister Roberts"	Mark Tinker	Story by : David Milch & Bill Clark; Teleplay by : Michael A. Graham	April 27, 1999	0C18/5618	15.34
Mike Roberts, a troubled former cop, meets an unfortunate end, which causes the detectives to reflect back on his cries for help. Sipowicz feels especially guilty about the situation until information from John Irvin leads him to the source of the tragedy. The squad then swings into action to stop the person who was apparently responsible for Roberts' death.: Daniel Benzali guest stars as James Sinclair, Esq.; Gail O'Grady makes an uncredited appearance as Donna Abandando
129	19	"Judas Priest"	Dennis M. White	Story by : David Milch & Bill Clark; Teleplay by : Meredith Stiehm	May 4, 1999	0C19/5619	13.12
Sipowicz and Sorenson must find more evidence in the Cullinan murder case; Sipowicz and Fancy try to help Ret. Det. Dornan with a drinking problem; ADA Leo Cohen and Jill's relationship comes to an end as he leaves the case.
130	20	"I'll Draw You a Mapp"	Donna Deitch	Story by : David Milch & Bill Clark; Teleplay by : Leonard Gardner	May 11, 1999	0C20/5620	13.83
Sipowicz is overly eager to testify in the Cullinan murder trial, but Costas worries that Sipowicz is no match for defense attorney James Sinclair. Much to Sipowicz's chagrin, Costas thinks Sorenson will make a stronger witness and Andy increasingly loses his mind over having to deal with Sinclair's psychological button-pushing. Meanwhile, Russell and Kirkendall lead the investigation of a home invasion murder in which the widow becomes the prime suspect and everyone throws the shooting of Amadou Diallo right in their faces.: Daniel Benzali guest stars as James Sinclair.; Julie Carmen guest stars as Nidia.
131	21	"Voir Dire This"	Paris Barclay	Story by : Bill Clark & Bernadette McNamara; Teleplay by : Bernadette McNamara	May 18, 1999	0C21/5621	15.01
While Sipowicz continues to be haunted by attorney James Sinclair, the Cullinan murder trial takes a horrific turn, and the lives of the 15th Precinct detectives will never be the same.: This episode was Sharon Lawrence's last appearance as Sylvia Costas.; Ed Bernard as Judge Sheegmuller
132	22	"Safe Home"	Mark Tinker	Story by : David Milch & Bill Clark; Teleplay by : David Milch	May 25, 1999	0C22/5622	20.23
Passions ignite when the detectives of the 15th Precinct go on a personal crusade to implicate the suspect they hold responsible for the death of Sylvia Costas, while simultaneously worrying about Andy's fragile state of mind—specifically whether he's going to start drinking again or kill himself. Meanwhile, John feels responsible for Sylvia's death.: Dennis Franz won the Primetime Emmy Award for Outstanding Lead Actor in a Drama Series based on this episode.
