= Hearts and Souls =

- NYPD Blue episode
- Episode no.: Season 6 Episode 5
- Directed by: Paris Barclay
- Written by: Steven Bochco; David Milch; Bill Clark; Nicholas Wootton
- Original air date: November 24, 1998

Guest appearances
- David Barrera as Dr. Victor Carreras; Jack Blessing as Dr. Swan; Bill Brochtrup as John Irvin; Leonard Gardner as Bar Customer; Lola Glaudini as Dolores Mayo; Cristian Guerrero as Bobby Simone's son; David Kriegel as Mitchell Wolf; James Luca McBride as Officer Mike Shannon (as James McBride); Debra Monk as Katie Sipowicz; Brad Sullivan as Patsy Ferrara; Tony Gomez as Priest; Bill Clark

Episode chronology
← Previous "Brother's Keeper"	Next → "Danny Boy"
- NYPD Blue (season 6)

"Hearts and Souls" is the fifth episode of the sixth season and 115th overall of the American crime drama NYPD Blue. "Hearts and Souls" originally aired in the United States on ABC on Tuesday, November 24, 1998, at 9:30 pm Eastern time as a 90-minute special. The episode was directed by Paris Barclay and written by Steven Bochco, David Milch, Bill Clark and Nicholas Wootton. It was the culmination of months of public speculation on the method of closure that would be employed to write Jimmy Smits's critically acclaimed Bobby Simone character out of the regular cast and clear the way for Smits' replacement, Rick Schroder. "Hearts and Souls" was a critical and commercial success, achieving both high ratings and positive critical feedback and is now regarded as one of the greatest episodes in television history. It marked the second high-profile replacement of the partner for lead character Detective Andy Sipowicz, played by Dennis Franz.

At the 51st Primetime Emmy Awards, this episode won awards for Direction for Paris Barclay and Guest Actress for Debra Monk as well as a nominations in Writing for Steven Bochco, David Milch, Bill Clark and Nicholas Wootton. Barclay also won a Directors Guild of America Award. The episode also won an Eddie Award and a Banff Rockie Award as well as a Cinema Audio Society Award nomination. While the episode was given a 90-minute timeslot on ABC when first aired, it has been shown in syndication as a regular episode covering around half of that time (the rest of the hour block is where commercials were in the pre-streaming era), with the subplot involving Greg Medavoy's angry interactions with an annoying complainant being entirely removed and the material with Andy and Katie being reduced somewhat.

This was Smits' last regular appearance as Simone, although he returned for one scene in an episode during the twelfth season. The episode highlights his rapid and mysterious physical demise, which has culminated in his need for a heart transplant. Many emotional portrayals are included to represent the feelings of loved ones, friends and colleagues when someone that they care about is suddenly in dire medical need. In another storyline, the episode simultaneously highlights the stress that can be caused when alcoholism afflicts a family through a critically acclaimed guest appearance by Debra Monk as the ex-wife of Sipowicz.

== Plot ==
The episode begins with a special five-minute extended "Previously on NYPD Blue" segment that retraces Simone's (Jimmy Smits) whole character history. The final portion of the prologue presents Lt. Arthur Fancy's (James McDaniel) prior episode persuasion of a police widow to directly donate her husband's heart to give Simone a chance to live. The regular portion of the episode begins after the completed heart transplant. The episode focuses on whether Simone's heart transplant was successful. It starts ten days after the heart transplant with his anticipated hospital release. Simone's recovery is hampered by an internal chest infection, which leaves him weakened. The doctors attempt diagnosis of the infection and weakness, which appear to be minor, with tests. Tensions run high in the department from almost the beginning of the episode. Greg Medavoy (Gordon Clapp) has a scene where his verbal aggression with a citizen complainant provides a respite and represents the frustration and helplessness of Simone's friends and colleagues. James Martinez' (Nicholas Turturro) generally good manners are also tested. Sipowicz (Dennis Franz) displays deep emotions to his wife ADA Sylvia Costas (Sharon Lawrence). The doctors differ in their opinions of which treatment to use. One advises Simone and wife Diane Russell (Kim Delaney) to pursue surgery, while another advises natural progression. Sipowicz's ex-wife Katie (Debra Monk) catches him offguard by appearing at the station drunk and asking for his help. She is preparing a pro se defense against DWI charges, but when Sipowicz is about to respond with assistance, she slips away. The personal turmoil drags him away from his compassionate watch. When he is distracted, Simone's health deteriorates to the point where his demise seems imminent. Dr. Carreras suggests ending the suffering, while Dr. Swan disagrees, but Carreras believes his sentiment is masking office politics that govern how statistics are attributed to various departments. Russell is conflicted on which doctor to take advice from. Sipowicz manages his ex-wife's crisis by negotiating agreed Alcoholics Anonymous meetings. After Simone receives his last rites, his colleagues say their goodbyes, while Simone dreams aloud of his mentor Patsy Ferrara. In Simone's waking dream, Patsy acts as a medium, helping Simone transition out of life. In the end, with his wife Russell, having removed his wedding ring, by his side, Simone, shedding a final tear, fades away, and the screen fades to white (as opposed to black).

== Production ==
=== Background ===
After one season on NYPD Blue, David Caruso decided to leave his role as Detective John Kelly and pursue a movie career when he was unable to secure a salary increase from $80,000 (US$173,776 in 2025 dollars) per episode to $100,000 (US$217,220). At the time, Caruso had a pending Primetime Emmy Award for Outstanding Lead Actor in a Drama Series nomination for the 46th Primetime Emmy Awards in 1994. Meanwhile, ABC was enduring the odd combination of high ratings, high critical praise and largescale network affiliate boycotts of its breakthrough use of nudity and profanity on public television that forced it to offer discounted advertising rates in spite of its success. Smits, who had left his Emmy Award-winning role as Victor Sifuentes on L.A. Law in 1991, was signed as a replacement on August 18, 1994. Caruso would continue in his role for the first four episodes of the second season, and Smits replaced him in a new role in episode 5 in November. Smits originally hoped to sign with the show for three years, while ABC sought a more standard five-year contract.

In April 1998, toward the end of the fifth season, Smits told Liz Smith that he would only perform in a handful of episodes in the sixth season in order to smoothly transition his character's departure. Smits declined interviews and made a written statement, but show creator Steven Bochco noted that Smits had come to the decision several weeks before he announced it. Smits earned five consecutive Primetime Emmy Award for Outstanding Lead Actor in a Drama Series nominations as well as three nominations for Golden Globe Award for Best Actor – Television Series Drama for the Simone role. Smits, who earned the Golden Globe Award at the 53rd Golden Globe Awards in 1996 for the role, stated that "I accomplished what I sought to do - to prove I can act - and now it's time to seek another course."

In mid-June 1998, rumors surfaced that Rick Schroder would replace Smits. The following week, Schroder was officially announced as the replacement. By late September, the buildup to Smits' departure was set to commence with the first episode of season 6, on October 20. On October 7, ABC announced that Smits would be stabbed in the opening episode of the season. The week before the season premiere, Mark Tinker revealed that Smits would be written out in the fifth episode of the season and Schroder would enter in the subsequent episode. Bochco revealed that National Enquirer and other gossip tabloids had offered to pay for details about the storyline. The five-week story arc was scheduled so that the final three weeks were in the November sweeps with Schroder's debut marking the final week of the sweeps. When the network decided to pre-empt the show on Election Night (November 3), the final episode was moved back to the second last night of sweeps.

The first week stabbing was regarded as similar to the murder of Jonathan Levin. ABC sent the media the first two episodes prior to the season 6 premiere. In the first episode, Smits is both stabbed and inadvertently cut by his dentist. Based on the first two episodes, Dave Matheny and Neal Justin of the Star Tribune determined that Simone would endure a worsening mysterious illness. In the third episode of the arc, Smits was hospitalized and in need of a heart transplant. The fourth episode was a buildup to impending heart surgery as he struggles with cardiomyopathy.

=== Writing ===
"The reason we did it this way actually has something to do with the fact…that the audience was so saturated with a kind of pre-existing knowledge about Jimmy's plans to leave," explained Milch. "It seemed to me that no story line that relied on any sort of unprepared-for outcome would work. Because… the audience's pre-existing expectations were that he was going to wind up going. So if you did some sort of surprise event there would be too radical a dysfunction between the story's premise and the audience's emotional expectation."

— David Milch, The Buffalo News (November 25, 1998).

In April, Bochco stated that he did not intend to kill off Smits' character, Simone. On L.A. Law, Smits had returned to the show for critically acclaimed guest appearances during sweeps episodes after leaving his regular role. Whether Smits' character would overlap with Schroder's character on screen was undetermined when Schroder was announced in June, but at the time Season 6 production was scheduled to commence on August 10, 1998. As of mid-July, Smits' departing episode was not scheduled to film until September.

On the eve of the season 6 premiere, NYPD Blue executives assured the public that Smits' storyline would not be irreversible. However, this led to doubt among critics who did not feel it was possible to have a sensible storyline that retained the services of Kim Delaney in the role of Simone's wife Detective Diane Russell. A humorous piece in Newsweek described the general consensus as "He's gonna die. He looks like he's dying...If he dies, it's easy to keep his wife (played by Kim Delaney) on the show." In addition, his castmates noted that their characters would grieve. However, some sources, such as National Public Radio's Noah Adams and Robert Siegel, read into the fact that "Network publicity speaks of Simone's departure, not his demise..."

=== Filming ===
In late August, Schroder participated in a New York City Police Department ride-a-long to prepare for his role. Season 6 production began the week of September 5. David Milch, who had had multiple angioplasties, influenced the storyline so that it would represent "the alienation and disempowerment that almost everyone feels in a hospital, without demonizing the hospital". Milch employed his brother, who is a doctor, as a consultant. He explained to his hometown newspaper, The Buffalo News, that the five-story arc was chosen because a surprise event would not have worked in this media age with the audience's expectation of the character's departure. According to Kim Delaney, during the filming of this episode the cast was repeatedly breaking down emotionally as if they were experiencing a personal death in the family.

The 90-minute special extended into the Sports Night time slot that preceded NYPD Blue during the 1998–99 United States network television season. Smits appeared in the November 9, 2004 "The Vision Thing" episode in his only return guest performance.

== Cast ==
- Jimmy Smits as Det. Bobby Simone
- Dennis Franz as Det. Andy Sipowicz
- James McDaniel as Lt. Arthur Fancy
- Nicholas Turturro as Det. James Martinez
- Sharon Lawrence as A.D.A. Sylvia Costas
- Gordon Clapp as Det. Greg Medavoy
- Kim Delaney as Det. Diane Russell
- Andrea Thompson as Det. Jill Kirkendall

== Reception ==
=== Awards and ratings ===
In 2009, TV Guide created TV Guide's 100 Greatest Episodes of All-Time, with this episode ranked number 30. Ron Epstein of Variety named it as the best of the 261 episodes of the series on March 1, 2005 on the day of the series' final episode. Director Paris Barclay won a Primetime Emmy Award for Outstanding Directing for a Drama Series and a Directors Guild of America Award for Outstanding Directing - Drama Series for his work in this episode. Debra Monk won Primetime Emmy Award for Outstanding Guest Actress in a Drama Series for this episode. Jane Kass won an American Cinema Editors Eddie Award in the category Best Edited One-Hour Series for Television for this episode. Steven Bochco Productions won a Banff Rockie Award for the Best Continuing Series at the Banff Television Festival for this episode. Elmo Ponsdomenech (re-recording mixer), J. Stanley Johnston (re-recording mixer) and Joe Kenworthy (production mixer) were nominated for a Cinema Audio Society Award for Outstanding Achievement in Sound Mixing for a Television Series. Steven Bochco, David Milch, Bill Clark and Nicholas Wootton were nominated for Primetime Emmy Award for Outstanding Writing for a Drama Series for the episode, while the other four nominees in the category were episodes of The Sopranos.

The episode finished second to 60 Minutes (23.56 million) for the week ending November 29 with a Nielsen Media Research estimated viewership of 22.10 million. It was the largest overall viewership in three years for the series and the best 18-49 demographic rating in two years.

=== Critical commentary ===
==== Buildup ====
Matthew Gilbert of The Boston Globe noted that the buildup to the finale added intrigue at the cost of cliche. John Levesque of the Seattle Post-Intelligencer said "the whole six-episode arc strikes me as a B or B-minus effort that got bogged down in one character and gave us all-too-familiar subplots that were lacking in imagination." Phil Rosenthal of the Chicago Sun-Times described the arc as a "lingering exit". Associated Press Television critic Frazier Moore found the entire story arc to be "a dramatic and fitting farewell for the character - and a proud performance by Smits". The Buffalo News describes the arc as "a brilliant five-episode story line".

==== Episode ====
Dusty Saunders of Rocky Mountain News described the farewell episode as "Unforgettable", praising several acting performances. Of Simone (Smits), he described his performance as "spellbinding" noting his "Particularly effective" and metaphorical scenes with his pigeons in addition to saying "Smits is not the first TV actor to portray a character, lying in bed, facing death. Such scenes are as common as headache relief commercials. However, Smits' compassionate portrayal is as realistic as weekly TV drama gets." He described Russell (Delaney) as "...superb Tuesday night, displaying both helpless agony and feisty determination." Although he praised her role as a wife, he noted that as a detective her dealings with her partner Det. Jill Kurkendall (Andrea Thompson) were clichéd. He noted that Greg Medavoy's (Gordon Clapp) "...frustration epitomizes the concern of the precinct crew as it monitors Bobby's Simone's battle for life." He noted that Sipowicz' (Franz) storyline with his first wife, Katie (Monk) "...provides a needed diversion from the hospital room drama."

Seattle Post-Intelligencer's Levesque claimed the finale had its ups and downs. He describes the Sipowicz subplot as the only "viable" one in the episode, stating that Monk's performance had "a frantic loneliness that almost brings the show back to its dark, gritty-streets realism". He claims this performance is tempered by the dramatic, but unrealistic "overwrought behavior" of Simone's fretful colleagues. He summarized the episode as "well written (by Nicholas Wootton) and generally well acted, with several characters having to experience a range of emotions", but was most disappointed in Delaney's performance as Russell.

The Chicago Sun-Times's Rosenthal described the episode as "wrenching" and a "powerful piece". He says the focus of the episode is whether Simone's transplant took and that the episode downplayed policework, while highlighting the interpersonal. He noted that the performance made Simone an Emmy Award favorite. He notes that a lot of emotions are displayed by Simone's colleagues and that the episode also has a meaningful secondary storyline in which Sipowicz shows volatility in the face of "Simone's uncertain health and the reappearance of his alcoholic ex-wife". Kevin Newman of ABC's Good Morning America described the finale as "very touching" and noted that Smits, himself, claimed to have warned his own mother not to watch because it would be "too emotional". The Associated Press' Moore described the episode as "moving".

Immediately before the finale, The Boston Globe's Gilbert praised the episode as "one of the series' most memorable" and "a highly emotional and yet restrained 90 minutes, with a satisfying resolution". He describes the special introduction as "a nice touch". He commends the writers for focusing the episode on "medical themes" rather than "crime investigation". He praises Delaney's performance over a range of emotions. He describes Monk's Katie Sipowicz "a prisoner of grief for their late son". He notes that Smits ends his NYPD Blue tenure with "grace and power".

The Buffalo News describes the finale as a "heart-pounding resolution", noting that the final moment between Sipowicz and Simone was "also emotional despite its simplicity". They note that the medical ethics consideration outdoes ER. They note that the "acting is uniformly excellent", praising Smits in particular for conveying emotion without much dialogue as well as Delaney for "capturing Diane's anxiety and heartache". They praise the pigeon scenes' ability to complement to the symbolic achievement of the episode that lives up to its billing.

Monica Collins of the Boston Herald said the episode "lives up to the hype" with "high melodrama" that offset "graceful, gutsy storytelling". She lauded the script, which delved into "the politics of medicine". The episode demonstrates the emotions of several relationships. Sipowicz endured heartfelt suffering due to the friendship that had grown beyond his imagination, while his ex-wife needed his emotional support and connections regarding her legal situation. He says Delaney had "an incredible performance" as "a perfect picture of pain and panic", while Smits "...goes out with dignity, with a performance that's all heart..."
