= NYPD Blue season 5 =

Season of television series

NYPD Blue
- Season 5
- Season 5 U.S. DVD cover
- No. of episodes: 22

Release
- Original network: ABC
- Original release: September 30, 1997 – May 19, 1998

Season chronology
- ← Previous; Season 4 Next → Season 6

The fifth season of NYPD Blue premiered on ABC on September 30, 1997, and concluded on May 19, 1998.

Actor	Character	Main cast	Recurring cast
Jimmy Smits	Bobby Simone	entire season	—N/a
Dennis Franz	Andy Sipowicz	entire season	—N/a
James McDaniel	Arthur Fancy	entire season	—N/a
Nicholas Turturro	James Martinez	entire season	—N/a
Gordon Clapp	Greg Medavoy	entire season	—N/a
Kim Delaney	Diane Russell	entire season	—N/a
Andrea Thompson	Jill Kirkendall	entire season	—N/a
Sharon Lawrence	Sylvia Costas	—N/a	episodes 1, 13, 16–22
Bill Brochtrup	John Irvin	—N/a	episode 16

== Episodes ==
No. overall	No. in season	Title	Directed by	Written by	Original release date	Prod. code	U.S. viewers (millions)
89	1	"As Flies to Careless Boys..."	Mark Tinker	David Milch	September 30, 1997	0T01/5501	18.07
After Joey Salvo's murder, Bobby's on suspension and has not talked to Andy for a while. With the FBI and Diane pushing him to clear his name by throwing Andy under the bus as the triggerman, Bobby confronts Andy about his suspicions regarding Salvo's murder. When Andy convinces him he's not the shooter, they put together a plan to shake loose the man they think did the crime. In other news, a drug-crazed man is murdering complete strangers because he thinks they are his enemies; Jill has a surprising new relationship; James and Greg are both going to be parents; and Bobby makes Diane an offer for life.: Guest cast listed alphabetically: Lourdes Benedicto as Gina Colon, Scott Allan Campbell as IAB Sgt. Jerry Martens, Jay Chandrasekhar as Man, Billy Concha as Officer Miller, Monique Edwards as Woman, John Finn as Lt. John Shannon, Scott Jaeck as FBI Agent Kriegel, Glenn Kessler as Paramedic, David Parker as Customer, Clifton Powell as Gerald / Frankie, Joe Sabatino as Officer Mackey.
90	2	"All’s Wells That Ends Well"	Paris Barclay	Story by : David Milch & Bill Clark; Teleplay by : Leonard Gardner	October 7, 1997	0T02/5502	18.64
Bobby's back on the job, but things are a little uneasy between him and Andy until they work a bar shooting where a terminally ill prison guard holds the key to solving the case. Diane uses a suspect's sexism against him on a string of rape-assault cases. James and Gina get married.: Mos Def guest stars as Levon Wells
91	3	"Three Girls and a Baby"	Mark Tinker	Story by : David Milch & Bill Clark; Teleplay by : Meredith Stiehm	October 14, 1997	0T03/5503	18.27
Greg swings into action when Abby's lover is murdered during a break-in, tying the case to a disturbed figure from Abby's past. The rest of the squad tries to unravel the case of a young woman who was shot and then burnt beyond recognition.
92	4	"The Truth Is Out There"	Dennis Dugan	Story by : David Milch & Bill Clark; Teleplay by : Edward Allen Bernero	October 28, 1997	0T04/5504	15.32
As Andy ponders the lyrics to "Pop Goes the Weasel", he and Bobby must help a murder witness who has a perfect head for details but is otherwise out of her mind. After she gets kidnapped, Andy's hypocrisy gets a workout when he castigates ADA Leo Cohen for making a deal to get her back safely, leading Jill to give Leo some kind words. Greg and James find out an Indian man's brother is behind a series of cab robberies.
93	5	"It Takes a Village"	Farrel Jane Levy	Story by : David Milch & Catherine Stribling; Teleplay by : Catherine Stribling	November 4, 1997	0T05/5505	17.47
Sipowicz struggles to suppress his rage while investigating the rape of a little girl, coming face to face with a suspect who sends him way over the edge. Meanwhile, Simone is utterly distressed by the brutal depths to which a drug-addicted mother will go to support her habit, then disgusted with himself while solving the murder of a Korean grocer. That murder takes place in predominantly black neighborhood and leaves the grocer's racist, miserable son hostile toward everyone, including the detectives at the 15th Precinct.: Daniel Dae Kim guest stars as Simon Lee; John Billingsley guest stars as Glenn Farley
94	6	"Dead Man Talking"	Donna Deitch	Jason Cahill	November 11, 1997	0T06/5506	16.44
Vince Gotelli returns to the 15th's lives when a sleazy bus driver comes under suspicion in the deaths of his wife and sick young son. Lt. Fancy gets a visit from an old friend, a musician dying of cancer who has information about a 20-year-old murder, and later reflects to the friend about his life and where it's going. A record company executive who nobody in his life could stand is beaten to death, but the investigation seems hopeless until some CSI work produces an obvious but still random suspect.: Lola Glaudini guest stars as Patty Bell, six episodes before joining the cast as Dolores Mayo and after playing Karen Thanos previously.; Mark Pellegrino guest stars as Fran Watkins.
95	7	"Sheedy Dealings"	Dennis Dugan	Story by : David Milch & Bill Clark; Teleplay by : Kevin Stevens	November 18, 1997	0T07/5507	15.13
Two young women who worked as exotic dancers are raped and murdered, leaving Andy and Bobby to wade through a sea of scum before closing the case. An unreliable acquaintance of Greg's says that a man's estranged wife and her new lover are in danger from the cuckolded husband, leading the cops on a wild goose chase. Diane is angry when a snooty woman blames an accidental theft on her immigrant housekeeper, and closes the case before letting the woman know she will get an IRS visit if she mistreats the worker again.
96	8	"Lost Israel (Part 1)"	Steven DePaul	Story by : Ted Mann & Bill Clark & Meredith Stiehm; Teleplay by : David Milch & Ted Mann	November 25, 1997	0T08/5508	15.69
A young boy named Brian is reported missing by his controlling father and distraught mother. The father becomes the prime suspect but all of the evidence points to a mute, homeless man named Israel. Andy is unable to hold his temper in check and after Brian is found dead, asks Fancy to remove him from the case. Diane is sidelined on a case involving the murder of a Hasidic woman, but Greg both solves the case and uses his knowledge about Judaism to provide comfort to the victim's loved ones.
97	9	"Lost Israel (Part 2)"	Paris Barclay	Story by : David Milch & Bill Clark; Teleplay by : David Milch & Nicholas Wootton	December 9, 1997	0T09/5509	18.25
Andy is left reading a Bible for answers after Israel commits suicide. While Diane tries to get the wife to tell what she knows about her husband, Bobby gets through the husband's defenses and he begins to start revealing terrible information. An insurance scam involving homeless amputees provides a ruse that lets the cops solve Brian's murder. Note: This episode exists in two versions. A 90-minute version was shown once during the original airing on ABC and is on the DVD release of Season 5. In order to fit in the show's usual 60-minute timeslot, a version was produced in which subplots involving Medavoy, Martinez, and Kirkendall's cases were edited out and only the main storyline about the Brian Egan murder remains. The 60-minute version is the only one that has been rebroadcast in reruns and syndication and is the version used on streaming services such as Hulu.
98	10	"Remembrance of Humps Past"	Jake Paltrow	Story by : David Milch, Bill Clark & John Chambers; Teleplay by : John Chambers	December 16, 1997	0T10/5510	15.59
Andy's old friend Wally asks him for help because Wally's daughter Carla is in a weird relationship with a woman named Margo. Andy learns Carla is a piece of garbage and her boyfriend is worse, and comes after them when Margo is beaten to death, though it's Bobby who gets to the point fastest. Greg and James bust a junkie who says he's been dumping dead bodies and associated parts around the city for a corrupt cemetery owner. Bobby learns the true background story of PAA Naomi.: Silas Weir Mitchell guest stars as Tony
99	11	"You’re Under a Rasta"	Bob Doherty	Story by : David Milch & Bill Clark; Teleplay by : Jody Worth	January 6, 1998	0T11/5511	16.20
Diane's pregnancy is revealed to Bobby, but it leads to an ugly scene when she insists on a dangerous assignment that turns into a shootout and he yells at her about it in front of everyone. James' anger overtakes both his reserve and his back when he finds out a city official threw an OD victim into a dumpster. Naomi tells Bobby she's been turned into the INS for being an illegal from Australia, but she will fight to stay in the U.S.
100	12	"A Box of Wendy"	Mark Tinker	Story by : David Milch & Bill Clark; Teleplay by : Meredith Stiehm	January 13, 1998	0T12/5512	16.97
In the 100th episode of the series, an attractive woman is found dead in a valuable wooden box. Andy and Bobby link the crime to her stupid, worthless brother, but it takes a few bottles of Coca-Cola to get the whole story. Diane's pregnancy weighs on her mind when an unloving mother's louse of a boyfriend accidentally kills her son. Greg, James and Jill catch a murder at a car-repair shop that turns complicated when the family of the victim says they and God forgive the killer.
101	13	"Twin Petes"	Matthew Penn	Story by : David Milch & Bill Clark; Teleplay by : T.J. English	February 10, 1998	0T13/5513	13.17
Greg's head is spinning when a man claims his identical twin is violent and threatening both himself and his girlfriend, and he tries to figure out if there is even another twin out there. A junkie is committing robberies at ATMs, and Jill's bonding with his mother may be the only way to bring him to justice. Andy gets medical news that he does not share with anyone, including Sylvia, and an attractive new PAA named Dolores arrives.
102	14	"Weaver of Hate"	Paris Barclay	Story by : David Milch & Bill Clark; Teleplay by : Dennis Woods-Doderer	February 17, 1998	0T14/5514	15.08
A teenager named Weaver is thrown to his death, but Fancy is more focused on his father's racial slurs than solving the case, eventually targeting Andy for doing his investigation objectively. After Bobby gets news from Diane that she has had a miscarriage, and has to listen to Fancy and Andy all day, he finally screams at them both to shut up. An African immigrant's wife is found hacked to death, and Jill figures out the buttons to push to find him and get him to confess.: Anthony Anderson guest stars as Vondell
103	15	"Don’t Kill the Messenger"	Matthew Penn	Story by : David Milch & Bill Clark; Teleplay by : Leonard Gardner	February 24, 1998	0T15/5515	16.62
A nurse is strangled and stabbed to death. Suspicion initially falls on a mental patient at the hospital she worked at, but Andy and Bobby later learn she was having an affair with a married uniform cop named Tommy Richardson, and try to prove he did the crime. Jill uses a trick involving a soda can to get a mute suspect to confess. Andy's doctor comes to the precinct to get him to face his bad health news, but Andy loses his temper and throws the guy out of the 15th.: Michael Wiseman guest stars as Tommy Richardson
104	16	"The One That Got Away"	Steven DePaul	Adisa Iwa	March 3, 1998	0T16/5516	16.10
Andy and Bobby continue to investigate Tommy Richardson, but none of their ideas work and the most Andy can do is warn Tommy to transfer out of the 15th. Two thugs beat up a student filmmaker and steal his camera, but Diane and Jill are worried the filmmaker will seek his own revenge; they end up finding a nice kid who was beaten up by the thugs but has evidence to bring them down, and shock the thugs by letting them know they're facing richly deserved prison time. Greg gets an emergency call from Abby only to learn she's not in labor, apparently ending up in some kind of speeding ticket issue. And Andy is confronted & comforted by a devastated Sylvia after she gets the word about his health: he has prostate cancer.: Michael Wiseman guest stars as Tommy Richardson; Charlotte Ross appears as Laurie Richardson, three years before joining the cast as Detective Connie McDowell. She reprised the role two episodes later in "I Don't Wanna Dye".
105	17	"Speak for Yourself, Bruce Clayton"	Mark Tinker	Story by : David Milch & Bill Clark; Teleplay by : Jody Worth	March 24, 1998	0T17/5517	15.71
A shooting at a health clinic turns out to be a love triangle involving a lonely wife, her angry boyfriend, and a white-knight guard whose desire to protect her leads to a shootout at the 15th. The rape of one woman and another's murder lead Andy and Bobby to a feud involving a crippled drug dealer who knows Andy from Andy's uglier days on the force. Andy tells Bobby about his health condition. Fancy is happy to do some police work when he takes a statement on the shooting case.: Giancarlo Esposito guest stars as Jamaal
106	18	"I Don’t Wanna Dye"	Perry Lang	Story by : David Milch & Bill Clark & Jill Goldsmith; Teleplay by : Jill Goldsmith	March 31, 1998	0T18/5518	15.27
Tommy Richardson's wife, Laurie, stops by the station to pick up his time records after he transfers to another precinct, where she expresses to Simone and Russell about Tommy's behavior after she caught him in a phone conversation with another woman. They work with Laurie on an incredibly dangerous plan to finally take Tommy down once and for all. Meanwhile, Medavoy and Kirkendall look into the death of a man who was shot and found in the bathtub of his former girlfriend next to a dude who was electrocuted. Also, Sylvia accompanies Sipowicz to the hospital for his CAT scan test which goes wrong, leading to the parting of ways between Andy and a fed-up Dr. Talbot in favor of treatment from Dr. Mondzac.: Karina Arroyave guest stars as Theresa Ocasio; Michael Wiseman guest stars as Tommy Richardson; Charlotte Ross appears as Laurie Richardson, three years before joining the cast as Detective Connie McDowell. She reprised the role two episodes prior in "The One That Got Away".
107	19	"Prostrate Before the Law"	Paris Barclay	Story by : David Milch & Bill Clark; Teleplay by : Robert Ward	April 28, 1998	0T19/5519	14.41
James and Greg reveal that Gina and Abby have given birth. Andy undergoes his prostate surgery and suffers through the agonizing first steps in his recovery process. The rest of the squad catches the murder of an Army veteran who was in town with five buddies from his service days. The more the cops talk to them, the more they learn they have uncovered a larger and more dangerous problem.: Titus Welliver played as Dr. Mondzac
108	20	"Hammer Time"	Mark Tinker	Story by : David Milch & Bill Clark; Teleplay by : Meredith Stiehm & Nicholas Wootton	May 5, 1998	0T20/5520	14.35
Andy is still in pain when he returns to work on a case involving the missing daughter of a crack addict. Andy clashes with ADA Cohen over an immunity plan and later has to use creativity when the girl is found dead. Sylvia shows up to help Andy as well as salvage a criminal case. Bobby learns an elderly tenant at his building is missing and speculation falls on Henry Coffield. Bobby does not think Henry's guilty and follows up on another lead when the elderly tenant's fate is revealed.: Terrence Howard guest stars as Lonnie; Willie Garson guest stars as Henry Coffield
109	21	"Seminal Thinking"	Matthew Penn	Story by : David Milch & Bill Clark & Kevin Arkadie; Teleplay by : Kevin Arkadie	May 12, 1998	0T21/5521	14.75
When the detectives are called to the scene of a murdered prostitute who is covered excessively with bodily fluid, a repulsed Medavoy employs a clever strategy to get the suspect's confession. Meanwhile, Simone and Sipowicz take pity on a misguided young man accused of killing a sleazy car dealer; and Sipowicz gets still more alarming news about his health.
110	22	"Honeymoon at Viagra Falls"	Paris Barclay	Story by : David Milch & Bill Clark; Teleplay by : David Milch and Scott Williams	May 19, 1998	0T22/5522	15.24
Simone and Sipowicz help a frenzied A.D.A. Cohen, who suspects that a defense attorney may have been involved in the execution-style murder of a witness and her child. Medavoy and Martinez bust a slick con man who manufactures fake sports memorabilia; Diane and Jill shift into overdrive to rescue a young girl from a pedophile, and both Simone and Sipowicz reach significant milestones in their romantic relationships. Note: This episode exists in two versions. A 90-minute version was shown once during the original airing on ABC and is on the DVD release of Season 5. In order to fit in the show's usual 60-minute time slot, a version was produced in which most of the scenes involving Martinez and Russell's cases, where they interview additional witnesses and suspects before arresting the perpetrators, were removed. The 60-minute version is the only one that has been rebroadcast in reruns and syndication and is the version used on streaming services such as Hulu.
