= Jody Worth =

American television writer and producer

- Occupation: Television writer
- Writing career
- Notable work: Deadwood

Jody Worth is an American television writer and producer. He has worked in both capacities on Deadwood and has been nominated for an Emmy Award and a Writers Guild of America Award for his work on the series. He is the son of producer and screenwriter Marvin Worth.

== Biography ==
=== 1980s ===
Worth worked as a music supervisor for the film Up the Academy in 1980.

He made his television writing debut on the NBC police drama Hill Street Blues. He wrote the seventh season episode "The Runner Falls on His Kisser" in 1987. The series was created by Steven Bochco and Michael Kozoll. It marked Worth's first collaboration with David Milch - then an executive producer on Hill Street Blues.

=== 1990s ===
He was a music supervisor for the film Flashback in 1990.

Worth became a writer for the first season of ABC police procedural NYPD Blue in 1994. The series was created by Steven Bochco and David Milch and centered on a homicide unit in New York. Worth wrote the story and co-wrote the teleplay (with producer Ted Mann) for the first season finale "Rockin' Robin". Worth returned to NYPD Blue as a writer for the fifth season in 1998. Worth wrote the episodes "You're Under a Rasta" and "Speak for Yourself, Bruce Clayton". He remained a writer for the sixth season in 1999. Worth wrote the teleplay for the episode "Don't Meth with Me" from a story by Milch and retired police detective Bill Clark.

Worth was a music supervisor for the television feature Gia in 1998.

=== 2000s ===
Worth became a regular writer for the seventh season of NYPD Blue in 2000. He wrote the teleplay for four episodes - "A Hole in Juan", "Along Came Jones", "Little Abner" and "Goodbye Charlie" - all from stories by David Milch and Bill Clark. Worth became a producer for the eighth season in January 2001 and wrote or co-wrote a further four episodes for the season. He co-wrote the season premiere "Daveless in New York" with Matt Olmstead. He also wrote the episodes "Waking Up Is Hard to Do", "Russellmania" and "Nariz a Nariz". Worth became a supervising producer for the ninth season in fall 2001 and wrote a further five episodes; "Two Clarks in a Bar", "Puppy Love", "Oh, Mama!", "A Little Dad'll Do Ya" and "Dead Meat in New Deli". Worth remained a supervising producer for the tenth season in 2002 and wrote or co-wrote a further three episodes. Worth wrote the episode "One in the Nuts". Olmstead and Nicholas Wootton co-wrote the teleplay for the episode "Healthy McDowell Movement" from a story Worth co-wrote with Clark. Worth and Clark also wrote the story for the episode "Marine Life". He left the crew at the end of the season having contributed as a writer to twenty episodes in total.

Worth joined the crew of HBO Western drama Deadwood as a writer and producer for the first season in 2004. The series was created by Milch and focuses on the growth of a settlement in the American West. Worth wrote the episodes "Reconnoitering the Rim" and "Bullock Returns to the Camp". He became a supervising producer for the second season in 2005. He wrote the episodes "A Lie Agreed Upon: Part II" and "E.B. Was Left Out". Worth left the crew at the end of the second season. Worth and the production staff were nominated for the Emmy Award for Outstanding Drama Series at the 57th Primetime Emmy Awards in 2005 for their work on the second season. Worth and the writing staff were also nominated for a Writers Guild of America Award for Outstanding Drama Series at the February 2006 ceremony for their work on the second season.

== Filmography ==
=== Television ===
Production staff

Year	Show	Role	Notes
2005	Deadwood	Supervising producer	Season 2
2004	Deadwood	Consulting producer	Season 1
2003	NYPD Blue	Supervising producer	Season 10
2002	NYPD Blue	Supervising producer	Season 10
2002	NYPD Blue	Supervising producer	Season 9
2001	NYPD Blue	Supervising producer	Season 9
2001	NYPD Blue	Producer	Season 8

Writer

Year	Show	Season	Episode title	Episode	Notes
2005	Deadwood	2	"E.B. Was Left Out"	7	
2005	Deadwood	2	"A Lie Agreed Upon: Part II"	2	
2004	Deadwood	1	"Bullock Returns to the Camp"	7	
2004	Deadwood	1	"Reconnoitering the Rim"	3	
1987	Hill Street Blues	7	"The Runner Falls on His Kisser"	20	
