= Bill Clark (screenwriter) =

American soldier, police detective, and screenwriter

Walter Clark
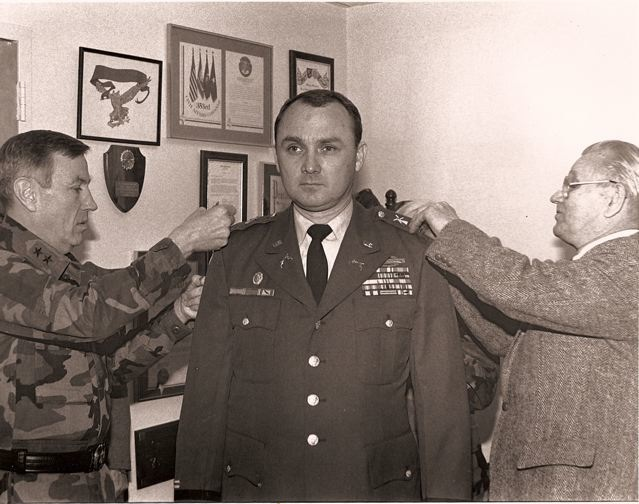
- Promotion to Major (General Barker, Bill Clark, Walter Clark Sr.)
- Born: May 20, 1944 (age 81); St. John's, Newfoundland, Canada
- Other names: Bill Clark
- Occupations: Writer, executive producer, retired detective (NYPD)

Bill Clark (born May 20, 1944) is a former New York Police Department detective and a television writer and producer. He was a veteran NYPD Detective First Grade before joining David Milch and Steven Bochco's NYPD Blue in the first season as technical consultant, drawing on his twenty-five years experience with New York undercover and homicide units to ensure that the series accurately and realistically portrayed the work of New York City detectives. He went on to win two Emmy Awards, and was also honored with a Writers Guild of America Award, a Peabody Award and two Humanitas Prize.

== Early life ==
Born in St. John's, Newfoundland and Labrador, on May 20, 1944, Clark grew up in Brooklyn, in an area now known as Park Slope.

While on the NYPD, Clark attended the New York Institute of Technology on the G.I. Bill, graduating with a B.A. in Criminal Justice.

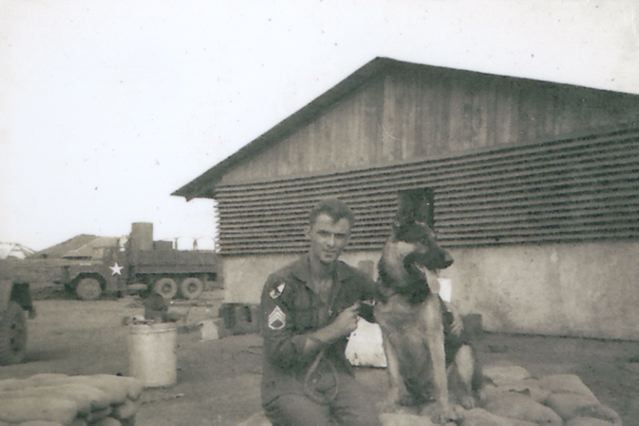

At age 17, Clark joined the United States Army, with tours of duty in Europe and Vietnam as a member of the 25th Infantry Division where he served as a scout dog handler, walking point with his German Shepherd Dog Mox, with the Forty-Sixth Infantry Platoon Scout Dog, Second Battalion, 14th Infantry Regiment.

While in the NYPD he joined the Army Reserve, entering at the rank of Staff Sergeant and retiring in 1989 as a Major.

== N.Y.P.D. ==
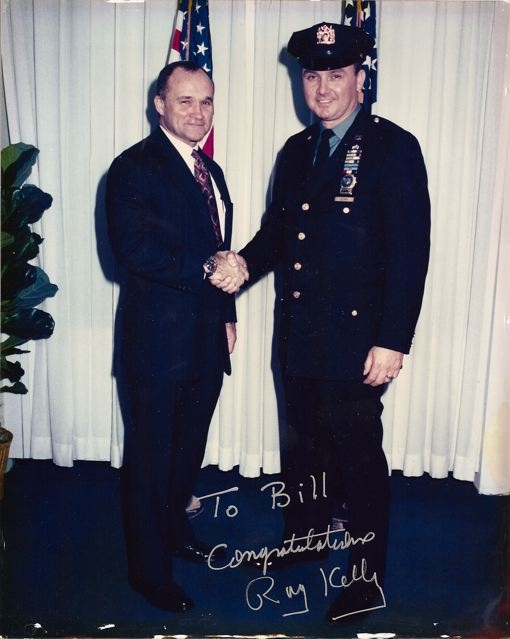
Promotion to First Grade Detective N.Y.P.D. with Ray Kelly

Clark joined the New York City Police Department in 1969. He worked a special undercover assignment for two years before entering the Police Academy. In 1972 he earned his gold detective shield. On December 31, 1994, Clark retired from the Queens Homicide Detective Squad as a First Grade Detective.

One of Clark's specialties on the force was interrogation. He worked on a number of headline cases ranging from the Son of Sam to crackdowns against the Gambino crime family.

His first assignment—even before he attended the Police Academy—was to infiltrate the Young Patriots Organization, an organization of white radicals who, he soon discovered, were planning to bomb several New York City landmarks.

== Television credits ==
- NYPD Blue (Writer, executive producer, technical advisor) (1993–2005)
- Brooklyn South (Supervising producer) (1997)
- Blind Justice (Executive producer) (2005)
- John from Cincinnati (Consulting producer) (2007)

He has had featured acting roles on L.A. Law, John from Cincinnati, Fallen, CSI: Miami and NYPD Blue.

Clark appeared on Charlie Rose in 1995 along with David Milch.

Activision consulted with Clark on their 2005 release True Crime: New York City.

== Awards and recognition ==
=== Emmy Awards ===
- 1995 Outstanding Drama Series (NYPD Blue)
- 1998 Outstanding Writing for a Drama Series (NYPD Blue, "Lost Israel (Part 2)")
- Nominated: 1996 Outstanding Drama Series (NYPD Blue)
- Nominated: 1997 Outstanding Drama Series (NYPD Blue)
- Nominated: 1998 Outstanding Drama Series (NYPD Blue)
- Nominated: 1998 Outstanding Writing for a Drama Series (NYPD Blue, "Lost Israel (Part 1)")
- Nominated: 1999 Outstanding Drama Series (NYPD Blue)
- Nominated: 1999 Outstanding Writing for a Drama Series (NYPD Blue, "Hearts and Souls")
- Nominated: 2002 Outstanding Writing for a Variety, Music or Comedy Program (America: A Tribute to Heroes)

=== Humanitas Prize ===
- 1999 90 Minute Category (NYPD Blue)
- Nominated: 1999 60 Minute Category (NYPD Blue, "Raging Bulls")

=== Peabody Award ===
- 1998 NYPD Blue, "Raging Bulls"
- 2001 America: A Tribute to Heroes

=== Writers Guild of America Award ===
- 1997 Episodic Drama (NYPD Blue, "Girl Talk")

=== Edgar Award ===
- Nominated: 1999 Best Television Episode (Brooklyn South, "Skel in a Cell", "Fools Russian")
- Nominated: 2002 Best Television Episode (NYPD Blue, "Johnny Got His Gold")
- Nominated: 2003 Best Television Episode (NYPD Blue, "Ho Down")

=== People's Choice Awards|People's Choice ===
- 1998 New Favorite TV Drama: Brooklyn South

=== United States Army ===
- Republic of Vietnam Campaign Medal
- Army Reserve Components Training Ribbon
- Army Service Ribbon
- Vietnam Service Medal
- National Defense Service Medal with Silver Oak Leaf Cluster
- Good Conduct Medal with Oak Leaf Cluster
- Army Achievement Medal
- Army Commendation Medal
- Meritorious Service Medal
- Combat Infantry Badge

== Author ==
He co-authored, along with NYPD Blue co-creator and executive producer David Milch, True Blue: The Real Stories Behind NYPD Blue (1995).
