= Andrea Thompson =

American actress

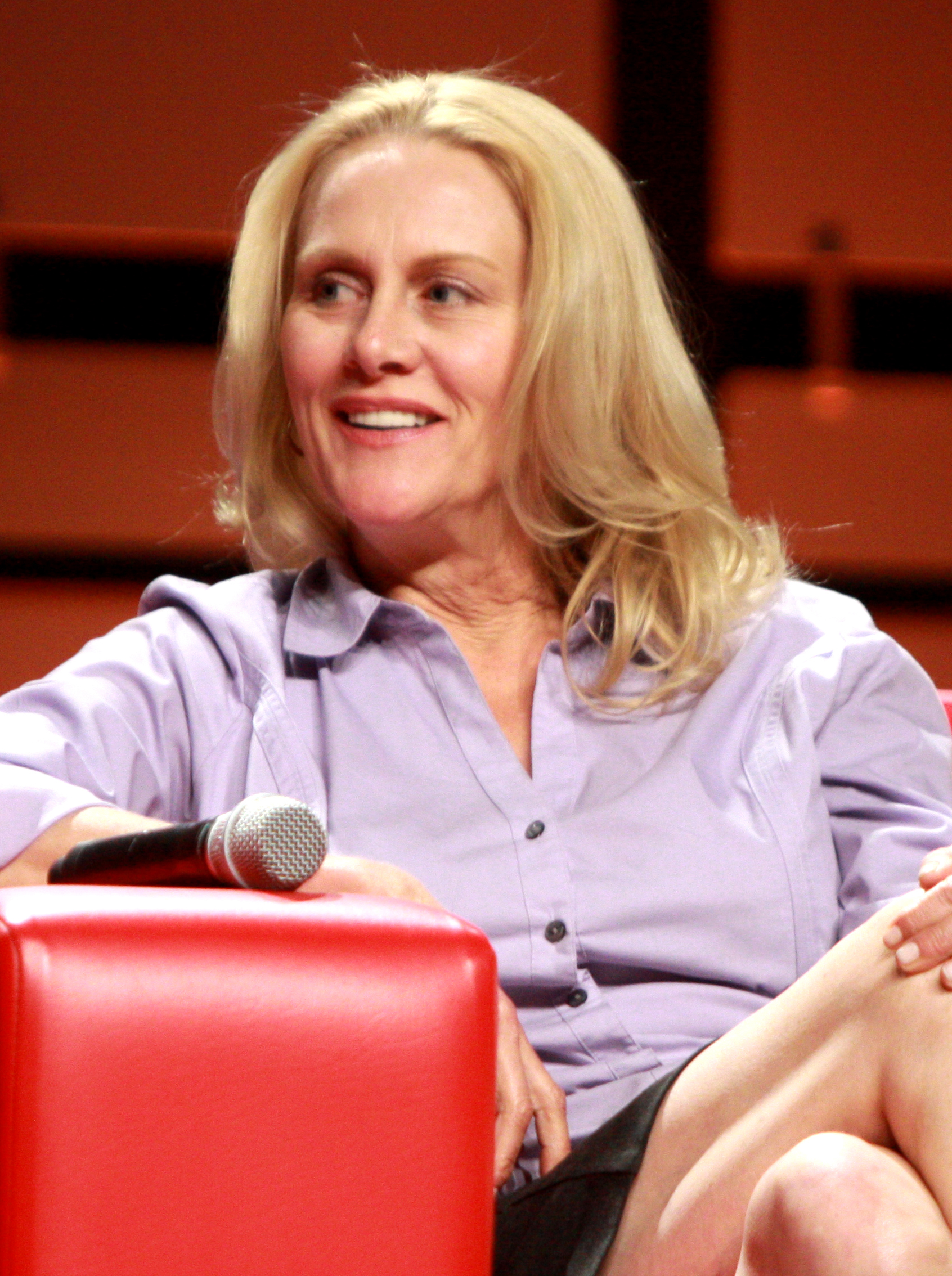
- Thompson in 2013
- Born: Andrea Rebecca Thompson; January 6, 1960 (age 66); Dayton, Ohio, U.S.
- Occupations: Actress, journalist
- Years active: 1986–present
- Spouses: David Guc (m. 1987; div. 1990) Jerry Doyle (m. 1995; div. 1997)
- Children: 2

Rebecca Andrea Thompson (born January 6, 1960) is an American actress, known for her roles on the television series Falcon Crest, Babylon 5, JAG, 24, and NYPD Blue.

== Early life ==
Andrea Thompson was born January 6, 1960, in Dayton, Ohio. When she was six, her family moved to Australia. She left high school at 16, and after an extended period of travel, she moved to New York City. She began modeling and studied acting at the Strasberg Studio and the Herbert Berghof Studio under Uta Hagen.

== Career ==
=== Acting career ===
Thompson began her career as a voiceover artist, which continues today. Her first significant film role was in the 1987 film Wall Street. In 1989, she was cast on the soap opera Falcon Crest as the scheming Genele Ericson during the show's final season, and played photojournalist Maggie Dawson in the Season 3, Episode 2 of the series Quantum Leap. In 1991, she played Nurse Helen Caldwell in the comedy film Delirious. In 1993 she was cast on the science fiction television series Babylon 5 as telepath Talia Winters. Thompson left the series in the middle of its second season.

Thompson moved on to join the cast of JAG midseason as Commander Alison Krennick, an aide to the Judge Advocate General of the Navy and direct supervisor of Harmon Rabb. She was among several actors who left the show when it was canceled by NBC after one season before CBS picked it up. She then went on to play Detective Jill Kirkendall on four seasons of crime drama NYPD Blue, leaving in April 2000 to pursue a career in journalism.

=== Journalism career ===
Thompson started to prepare for her journalism career in 1999, by earning her GED and working for one year with Jack Hubbard, associate director of Stanford University's News Service and a veteran journalist of CBS News. During this time, she also took a writing seminar with KGO-TV's feature reporter Wayne Freedman. She began her work with then-CBS affiliate KRQE in Albuquerque, New Mexico, as a general assignment reporter for $26,000 per year.

Thompson joined CNN Headline News as an evening anchor in June 2001. CNN had laid off 400 of 4,000 employees in January, and was refocusing on personalities to draw in younger viewers. Her first words on-screen as reporter were "Hi, I'm Andrea Thompson, and unless you've been living in a cave, you probably already know that." Her hiring generated controversy in journalism circles, mostly because Thompson had just one year of journalism experience. Nude pictures and videoclips of Thompson taken from her 1980s-era movies also began circulating on the Internet, causing some embarrassment for CNN. Thompson left the network in March 2002. During an appearance in January 2003, she made a statement indicating she left CNN because she disagreed with the way the news was handled, "Basically... you just give the viewers enough to scare the hell out of them, and not any real valuable information. And we saw so much of that after Sept. 11 that I thought was, frankly, irresponsible."

After leaving CNN, she went to work for Court TV, introducing episodes of NYPD Blue and Forensic Files, as well as narrating the documentary series The System. She began hosting Psychic Detectives in 2003.

=== Return to acting ===
Thompson had a recurring guest role as Doctor Nicole Duncan on the third season of the television series 24, first appearing on that show in November 2003.

In 2007, she appeared in season two of Bones in the episode "Spaceman in a Crater".

In 2009, she played Field Agent Anne Hudson in "Outfoxed", a season five episode of the series Criminal Minds.

== Personal life ==
Thompson was married to David Guc from 1987 to 1990, and to Babylon 5 costar Jerry Doyle from 1995 to 1997. In 1992 she gave birth to a son.
