= Steven DePaul =

American television director and producer

Steven DePaul is an American television director, producer and mystery author. His books, "The Left Coast Irregulars", "Frequently Asked Questions" and "Riot House" are the "power trio" of the Rock and Roll Confidential Mystery series, available on Amazon. He has directed multiple episodes of "The Good Doctor", "The Gifted", Shades of Blue, NCIS-LA, CSI-NY, GRIMM, The Unit, Bones, as well as many episodes of one-hour dramatic television (updated list IMDB). He was a longstanding producer and director on NYPD Blue. In his capacity as producer of NYPD Blue he won the Emmy Award for Outstanding Drama Series in 1995. He was also nominated for NYPD Blue on five other occasions (in 1994, 1996, 1997, 1998 and 1999). Also wonGolden Globe Award for Best Television Series – Drama in 1993, and a George F. Peabody for "Raging Bulls" (Season 6, episode 8), an episode he directed for NYPD Blue.

DePaul was born in Washington Heights, NY. He is the son of Michael DePaola, (SSGT World War II in North Africa and Italy. Purple heart, BSM) who was a union organizer (District 65) and a bartender. His mother, Hermione (Billie), was a school teacher and librarian. Brother of David DePaul (1948-1969). Steven enrolled at Clark University, where he majored in English graduating in Dec. 1972. He was involved in booking artists to play concerts on campus and at the Clark Coffeehouse. Upon graduation, DePaul began working on Rock & Roll tours, first working as a roadie for Poco ('73-74). He spent the next 15 years touring with bands including Joni Mitchell, The Eagles, The Grateful Dead, Dan Fogelberg, Crosby, Stills and Nash, Boston, The Cars and The Faces. This career ended with a long stint, ('84-'92) with Bruce Springsteen and the E Street Band, including the "Born in the USA" tour and the worldwide Amnesty International "Human Rights Now!" tour. DePaul then moved to Los Angeles to work for producer Steven Bochco on shows including Cop Rock, Civil Wars and NYPD Blue. He worked on NYPD Blue for 11 years, during which he directed multiple episodes. In 2004, he left NYPD Blue and became a freelance director, the position he currently holds. He has travelled extensively on six continents.

== Filmography ==
=== Producer ===
Year	Show	Role
2004	NYPD Blue	Supervising producer
2003	NYPD Blue	Supervising producer
2002	NYPD Blue	Supervising producer
2001	NYPD Blue	Supervising producer
2001	NYPD Blue	Producer
2000	NYPD Blue	Producer
1999	NYPD Blue	Producer
1999	NYPD Blue	Co-producer
1998	NYPD Blue	Co-producer
1997	NYPD Blue	Co-producer
1996	NYPD Blue	Co-producer
1995	NYPD Blue	Co-producer
1994	NYPD Blue	Co-producer
1993	NYPD Blue	Co-producer

=== Director ===
Year	Show	Role	Notes
2022	The Good Doctor	"The Lea Show"	Season 5, episode 17
2022	The Cleaning Lady	"Coming Home Again"	Season 1, episode 9
2020	The Good Doctor	"Heartbreak"	Season 3, episode 18
2020	The Good Doctor	"Sex and Death"	Season 3, episode 13
2019	The Village	"Laid Bare"	Season 1, episode 5
2019	The Village	"Heart on Fire"	Season 1, episode 4
2018	The Good Doctor	"Tough Titmouse"	Season 2, episode 4
2018	The Gifted	"unMoored"	Season 2, episode 2
2017	The Gifted	"threat of eXtinction"	Season 1, episode 9
2017	The Good Doctor	"Pipes"	Season 1, episode 4
2017	Shades of Blue	"Behind the Mask"	Season 2, episode 12
2017	Shades of Blue	"Broken Dolls"	Season 2, episode 13
2016	Shades of Blue	"For I Have Sinned"	Season 1, episode 12
2016	Shades of Blue	"The Breach"	Season 1, episode 11
2015	The Originals	"Beautiful Mistake"	Season 3, episode 6
2014	The 100	"Fog of War"	Season 2, episode 6
2014	Crisis	"Homecoming"	Season 1, episode 7
2014	Grimm	"Once We Were Gods"	Season 3, episode 15
2013	Grimm	"One Night Stand"	Season 3, episode 4
2013	NCIS: Los Angeles	"Big Brother"	Season 5, episode 6
2013	Zero Hour	"Chain"	Season 1, episode 4
2013	Hawaii Five-O	"Kapu"	Season 3, episode 12
2013	NCIS: Los Angeles	"Drive"	Season 4, episode 11
2012	Last Resort	"Voluntold"	Season 1, episode 4
2012	Grimm	"The Good Shepherd"	Season 2, episode 5
2012	Grimm	"Plumed Serpent"	Season 1, episode 14
2011	NCIS: Los Angeles	"The Debt"	Season 3, episode 10
2011	Person Of Interest	"Mission Creep"	Season 1, episode 3
2011	Fairly Legal	"Coming Home"	Season 1, episode 7
2011	NCIS: Los Angeles	"Enemy Within"	Season 2, episode 19
2010	NCIS: Los Angeles	"Absolution"	Season 2, episode 9
2010	NCIS: Los Angeles	"Little Angels"	Season 2, episode 5
2010	NCIS: Los Angeles	"Hunted"	Season 1, episode 22
2010	CSI: NY	"Redemptio"	Season 6, episode 19
2010	Past Life	"Soul Music"	Season 1, episode 3
2009	NCIS: Los Angeles	"Random On Purpose"	Season 1, episode 9
2009	Bones	"The Cinderella in the Cardboard"	Season 4, episode 19
2009	Bones	"The Salt in the Wounds"	Season 4, episode 16
2009	Bones	"The Princess and the Pear"	Season 4, episode 14
2008	The Unit	"Mislead and Misguided"	Season 4, episode 10
2008	The Unit	"Sudden Flight"	Season 4, episode 2
2008	Terminator: The Sarah Connor Chronicles	"Complication"	Season 2, episode 9
2008	Bones	"The Passenger in the Oven"	Season 4, episode 9
2008	Bones	"The Crank in the Shaft"	Season 4, episode 5
2008	Bones	"The Man in the Outhouse	Season 4, episode 2
2007	Bones	"The Secret in the Soil"	Season 3, episode 4
2007	Journeyman	"The Hanged Man"	Season 1, episode 5
2007	K-Ville	"Critical Mass"	Season 1, episode 5
2007	Jericho	"Cassus Belli"	Season 1, episode 19
2007	CSI: NY	"The Ride In"	Season 3, episode 17
2007	Las Vegas	"The Chicken Is Making My Back Hurt"	Season 4, episode 12
2007	The Unit	"Binary Explosion"	Season 3, episode 9
2007	The Unit	"Pandemonium: Part 2"	Season 3, episode 2
2007	The Unit	"Sub-conscious"	Season 2, episode 13
2006	The Unit	"Change of Station"	Season 2, episode 1
2006	The Unit	"SERE"	Season 1, episode 8
2006	Shark	"In the Grasp"	Season 1, episode 5
2006	Conviction	"The Wall"	Season 1, episode 9
2006	Bones	"The Truth in the Lye"	Season 2, episode 5
2006	Las Vegas	"And Here's Mike with the Weather"	Season 3, episode 14
2006	In Justice	"Confessions"	Season 1, episode 4
2006	CSI: NY	"Super Men"	Season 2, episode 19
2006	CSI: NY	"Necrophilia Americana"	Season 2, episode 17
2005	CSI: NY	"YoungBlood"	Season 2, episode 6
2005	Close to Home	"Suburban Prostitution"	Season 1, episode 3
2004	CSI: Miami	"Addiction"	Season 3, episode 11
2004	NYPD Blue	"Colonel Knowledge"	Season 11, episode 14
2002	NYPD Blue	"Half-Ashed"	Season 10, episode 9
2002	NYPD Blue	"A Little Dad'll Do Ya"	Season 9, episode 16
2001	NYPD Blue	"Mom's Away"	Season 9, episode 7
2001	NYPD Blue	"Nariz A Nariz"	Season 8, episode 14
2001	NYPD Blue	"Writing Wrongs"	Season 8, episode 6
2001	NYPD Blue	"Waking Up Is Hard To Do"	Season 8, episode 2
2000	NYPD Blue	"Bats Off Larry"	Season 7, episode 21
2000	NYPD Blue	"Jackass"	Season 7, episode 9
2000	NYPD Blue	"A Hole in Juan"	Season 7, episode 2
1999	NYPD Blue	"Don't Meth With Me"	Season 6, episode 19
1998	NYPD Blue	"Raging Bulls"	Season 6, episode 8
1998	NYPD Blue	"The One That Got Away"	Season 5, episode 16
1997	NYPD Blue	"Lost Israel: Part 1"	Season 5, episode 8
1993	NYPD Blue	"Emission Accomplished"	Season 1, episode 5
