= Robert J. Doherty =

American photographer, scholar, and museum professional (1924–2019)

Robert J. Doherty (1924 – January 6, 2019) was an American photographer, scholar, and museum professional. His photographic work was first shown at Watertown, Connecticut, then at The Arts Club of Louisville, Louisville Art Center Association School, and at the Allen R. Hite Art Institute, University of Louisville. He became curator of the photography collection of the Hite Art Institute in 1962 and acting director of the institute two years later, and served as director from 1967 to 1972. From 1972 to 1981, he served as the fourth director of the George Eastman Museum (then George Eastman House). He has also written on Social Documentary Photography, Creative Photography, and World War I photographs.

Doherty obtained a degree in fine art from the Rhode Island School of Design in 1951 (where he became Director of Development six years later) and an MFA from Yale in 1954. After graduation, he received the first of several significant design awards from the American Institute of Architects, the American Institute of Graphic Arts, and the Lithographers and Printers National Association. In 1959 he published a book Aluminum Foil Design. In the same year he was named associate professor of the Fine Arts Department at the University of Louisville, becoming professor in 1965 and chairman in 1967. In 2010, the University of Louisville awarded Doherty the degree of Doctor of Fine Arts honoris causa in recognition of his lifetime of contributions to photography, design, typography and letter press, and historic preservation, as well as his inspiration and mentoring of students, professionals, and institutions in these fields.

== Publications ==
Robert J. Doherty, Social-Documentary Photography in the USA, Hardcover, Amphoto, ISBN 0-8174-0316-7 (0-8174-0316-7)
