= Mark Tinker =

American television producer (born 1951)

- Born: Mark Christian Tinker; January 16, 1951 (age 75); Stamford, Connecticut, U.S.
- Education: Syracuse University (1973)
- Occupations: Director, producer
- Years active: 1973–present
- Spouses: Kristin Harmon (m. 1988; div. 2000) Chandra West (m. 2005)
- Parent(s): Grant Tinker; Ruth Byerly
- Relatives: John Tinker (brother); Zach Tinker (nephew)

Mark Tinker (born January 16, 1951) is an American television producer and director.

== Early life ==
Tinker was born in Stamford, Connecticut, the son of Ruth Prince Tinker (née Byerly) (1927–2004) and future NBC chairman Grant Tinker (1926–2016), and is the brother of John Tinker, with whom he worked on St. Elsewhere. His stepmother was Mary Tyler Moore, who was married to Grant Tinker from 1962 until 1981. His brother Michael was a Los Angeles policeman and detective for over 30 years.

Tinker graduated from Darien High School and Syracuse University with honors in 1973.

== Career ==
Tinker was an executive producer and regular director on the HBO series Deadwood. Tinker joined the HBO western drama Deadwood for the third and final season in 2006. The series was created by David Milch and focused on a growing town in the American West. Prior to Deadwood, Tinker served as a director/producer on NYPD Blue, which was co-created by Deadwood writer David Milch. Tinker also produced and/or directed episodes of The White Shadow, St. Elsewhere, Capital News, Civil Wars, Chicago Hope, L.A. Law, Grey's Anatomy, Private Practice, Scandal, Chicago P.D., Magnum P.I., and American Gods.Tinker last collaborated with David Milch on the short-lived HBO drama series John from Cincinnati, which began airing in June, 2007. Tinker directed the pilot and served as executive producer. Tinker has 4 Emmy awards - 1 for producing NYPD Blue, 1 for directing NYPD Blue, 1 for directing St. Elsewhere and 1 for directing the Brooklyn South pilot. Additionally, he has 3 George Foster Peabody awards, 3 Humanitas Prize awards and 7 DGA nominations.

== Personal life ==
Formerly married (1988–2000) to the actress and painter Kristin Harmon, he married actress Chandra West in October 2005.

== Filmography ==
- Magnum P.I.
  - 1.14 "Nowhere to Hide" (2019) TV Episode
- For the People
  - episode 1.02 "Rahowa" (2018) TV Episode
- Chicago Med
  - 3.03 "Trust Your Gut" (2017) TV Episode
- Chicago P.D.
  - 1.04 "Trust is Always Temporary" (2014) TV Episode
  - 1.07 "The Price We Pay" (2014) TV Episode
  - 1.12 "8:30 PM" (2014) TV Episode
  - 1.15 "A Beautiful Friendship" (2014) TV Episode
  - 2.1 "Call It Macaroni" (2014) TV Episode
  - 2.5 "An Honest Woman" (2014) TV Episode
  - 2.14 "Erin's Mom" (2015) TV Episode
  - 2.21 "There's My Girl" (2015) TV Episode
  - 2.23 "Born Into Bad News" (2015) TV Episode
  - 3.2 "Natural Born Storyteller" (2015) TV Episode
  - 3.5 "Climbing Into Bed" (2015) TV Episode
  - 3.11 "Knocked The Family Right Out" (2016) TV Episode
  - 3.19 "If We Were Normal" (2016) TV Episode
  - 3.23 "Street Digging" (2016) TV Episode
  - 4.1 "The Silos" (2016) TV Episode
  - 4.6 "Some Friend" (2016) TV Episode
  - 4.11 "You Wish" (2017) TV Episode
  - 4.14 "Seven Indictments" (2017) TV Episode
  - 4.23 "Fork in the Road" (2017) TV Episode
  - 5.8 "Politics" (2017) TV Episode
  - 5.11 "Confidential" (2018) TV Episode
- Scandal
  - episode 2.04 "Beltway Unbuckled" (2012) TV Episode
  - episode 2.14 "Whiskey Tango Foxtrot" (2013) TV Episode
  - episode 2.21 "Any Questions?" (2013) TV Episode
- Private Practice
  - episode 1.01 "In Which We Meet Addison, a Nice Girl From Somewhere Else" (2007) TV Episode
  - episode 1.03 "In Which Addison Finds the Magic" (2007) TV Episode
  - episode 1.08 "In Which Cooper Finds a Port In His Storm" (2007) TV Episode
  - episode 2.01 "A Family Thing" (2008) TV Episode
  - episode 2.08 "Crime and Punishment" (2008) TV Episode
  - episode 2.12 "Homeward Bound" (2009) TV Episode
  - episode 2.16 "Ex-Life" (2009) TV Episode
  - episode 2.19 "What Women Want" (2009) TV Episode
  - episode 3.01 "A Death in the Family" (2009) TV Episode
  - episode 3.07 "The Hard Part" (2009) TV Episode
  - episode 3.10 "Blowups" (2009) TV Episode
  - episode 3.16 "Fear of Flying" (2010) TV Episode
- John from Cincinnati
  - episode 1.01 "Pilot"
- Deadwood
  - episode 3.01 "Tell Your God to Ready for Blood" (2006) TV Episode
  - episode 3.07 "Unauthorized Cinnamon" (2006) TV Episode
  - episode 3.10 "A Constant Throb" (2006) TV Episode
  - episode 3.12 "Tell Him Something Pretty" (2006) TV Episode
- Grey's Anatomy (2005)
  - episode 2.27 "Losing My Religion" (2006) TV Episode
  - episode 2.05 "Bring the Pain" (2005) TV Episode
- 'NYPD Blue
  - "Frickin' Fraker" (2003) TV Episode
  - "Danny Boy" (1998) TV Episode
  - "Top Gum" (1998) TV Episode
  - "Hammer Time" (1998) TV Episode
  - "A Box of Wendy" (1998) TV Episode
- Philly (2001) TV Series
- Brooklyn South (1997) TV Series
- Bonanza: Under Attack (1995) (TV)
- ER
  - "Going Home" (1994) TV Episode
- Chicago Hope (1994) TV Series
- L.A. Law
  - "Dead Issue" (1994) TV Episode
  - "God Is My Co-Counsel" (1994) TV Episode
  - "Foreign Co-respondent" (1993) TV Episode
  - "Book of Renovation, Chapter 1" (1993) TV Episode
- Civil Wars (1991) TV Series (1991–1993)
- Babe Ruth (1991) (TV)
- N.Y.P.D. Mounted (1991)
- Our Shining Moment (1991)
- My Old School (1991) (TV)
- Capital News (1990) (TV)
- Private Eye (1987)
- St. Elsewhere (1982) TV Series (1982–1988)
- Making the Grade (1982) TV Series
- The White Shadow (1978)
- The Bob Newhart Show
  - "Carol Ankles for Indie-Prod" (1978)
