= Nicholas Wootton =

American television writer and producer

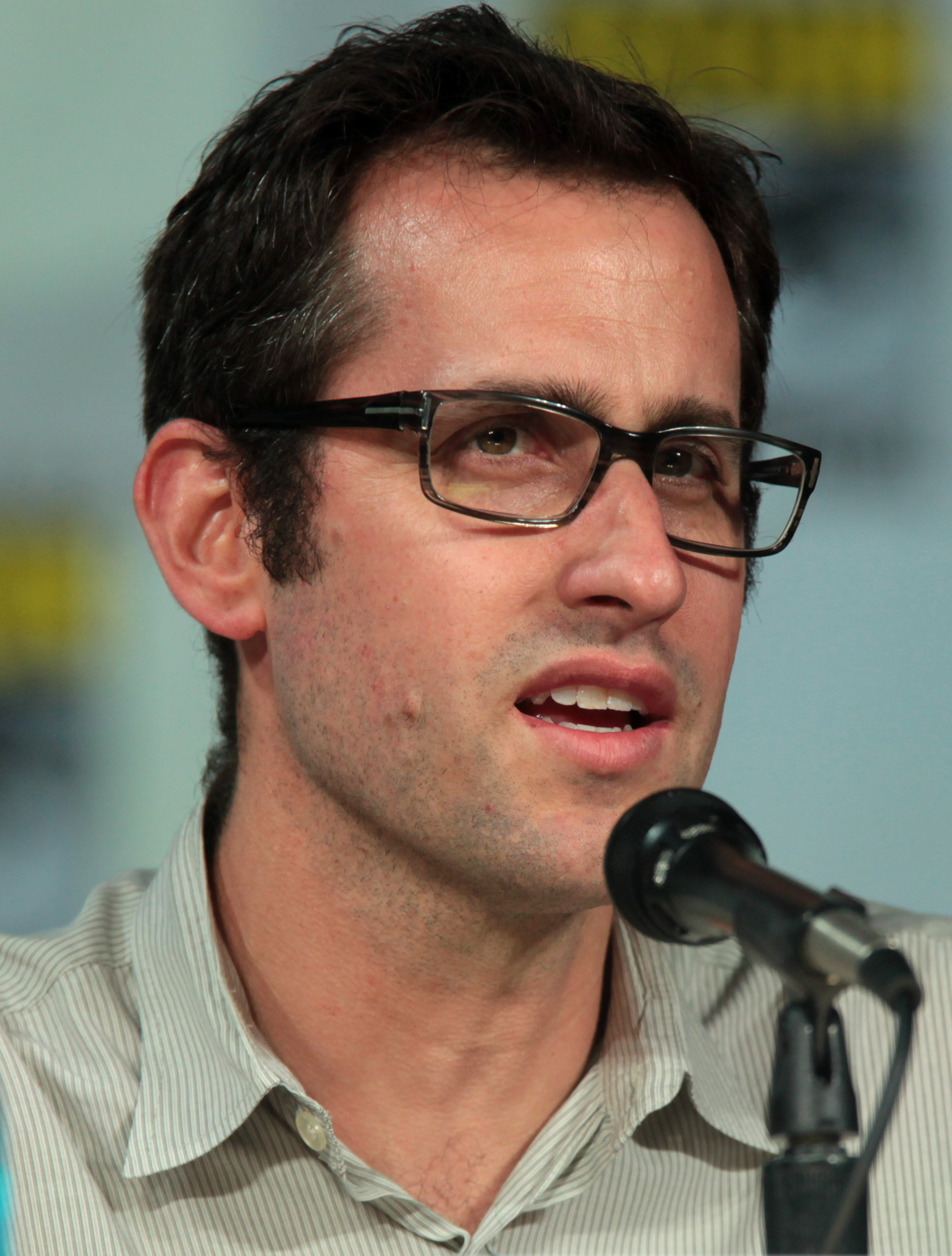
Wootton at the 2014 Comic-Con International

Nicholas Wootton is an American television writer and producer. He has written for various TV shows, including Chuck, Prison Break, Law & Order, NYPD Blue, Scorpion and The Endgame.

In 1998, he won the Primetime Emmy Award for Outstanding Writing for a Drama Series, for his work in NYPD Blue.
