= List of awards and nominations received by NYPD Blue =

List of awards won by NYPD Blue
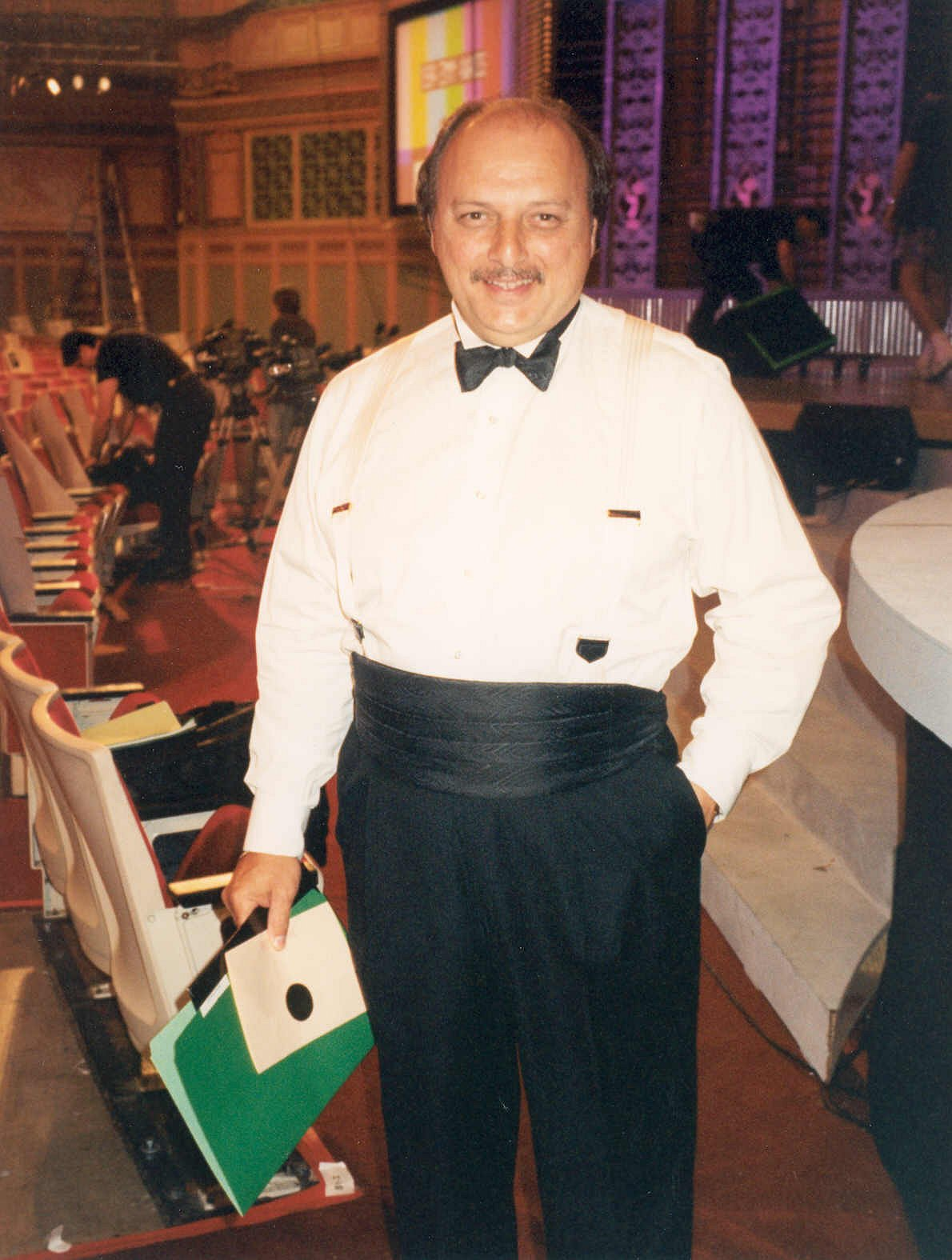
- Dennis Franz has received the most awards and nominations for his performance on the series as Andy Sipowicz.
Awards and nominations
Award	Won	Nominated
Directors Guild of America Awards	2	8
Emmy Awards	20	84
Golden Globe Awards	4	13
Golden Reel Awards	0	4
Humanitas Prize	2	5
OFTA Television Awards	1	1
Peabody Award	2	2
People's Choice Awards	2	2
PRISM Awards	1	3
Satellite Awards	2	11
Screen Actors Guild Awards	3	23
Television Critics Association Awards	1	11
TV Guide Awards	0	6
TV Land Awards	0	1
Writers Guild of America Awards	1	3
Young Artist Awards	1	6
- Total number of wins and nominations
Totals	84	285
- References

NYPD Blue is an American television police procedural drama series that aired on ABC from September 21, 1993, to March 1, 2005. Created by Steven Bochco and David Milch, the show follows the cases of the fictional 15th Precinct of Manhattan, as well as the individual lives of its workers. Featuring a changing ensemble of actors, Dennis Franz and Gordon Clapp were among the longest lasting cast members, appearing in every season in a major capacity.

NYPD Blue has garnered critical acclaim for its honest and gritty portrayal of the officers' personal and professional lives. Since its debut, the series has been nominated for 84 Primetime Emmy awards (winning 20), 13 Golden Globe awards (winning four), 23 SAG awards (winning three), 8 Directors Guild of America awards (winning two), 11 Satellite awards (winning two) and 11 TCA awards (winning one) among others. The series also garnered various industry and pop culture awards and nominations.

Many of the actors and crew members were recognized for their individual work, winning several Emmy, Golden Globe, and SAG awards among others. Dennis Franz, the lead actor of the series, won 4 Emmy awards, a Golden Globe award, 3 SAG awards, and 5 Q awards, becoming the most decorated cast member of the series. Kim Delaney and Jimmy Smits won an Emmy award and a Golden Globe, respectively, for their performances on the series, in addition to receiving several nominations for Emmy awards, Golden Globe Awards, Golden Satellite awards and SAG awards.

== Awards and nominations ==
=== ALMA Awards ===
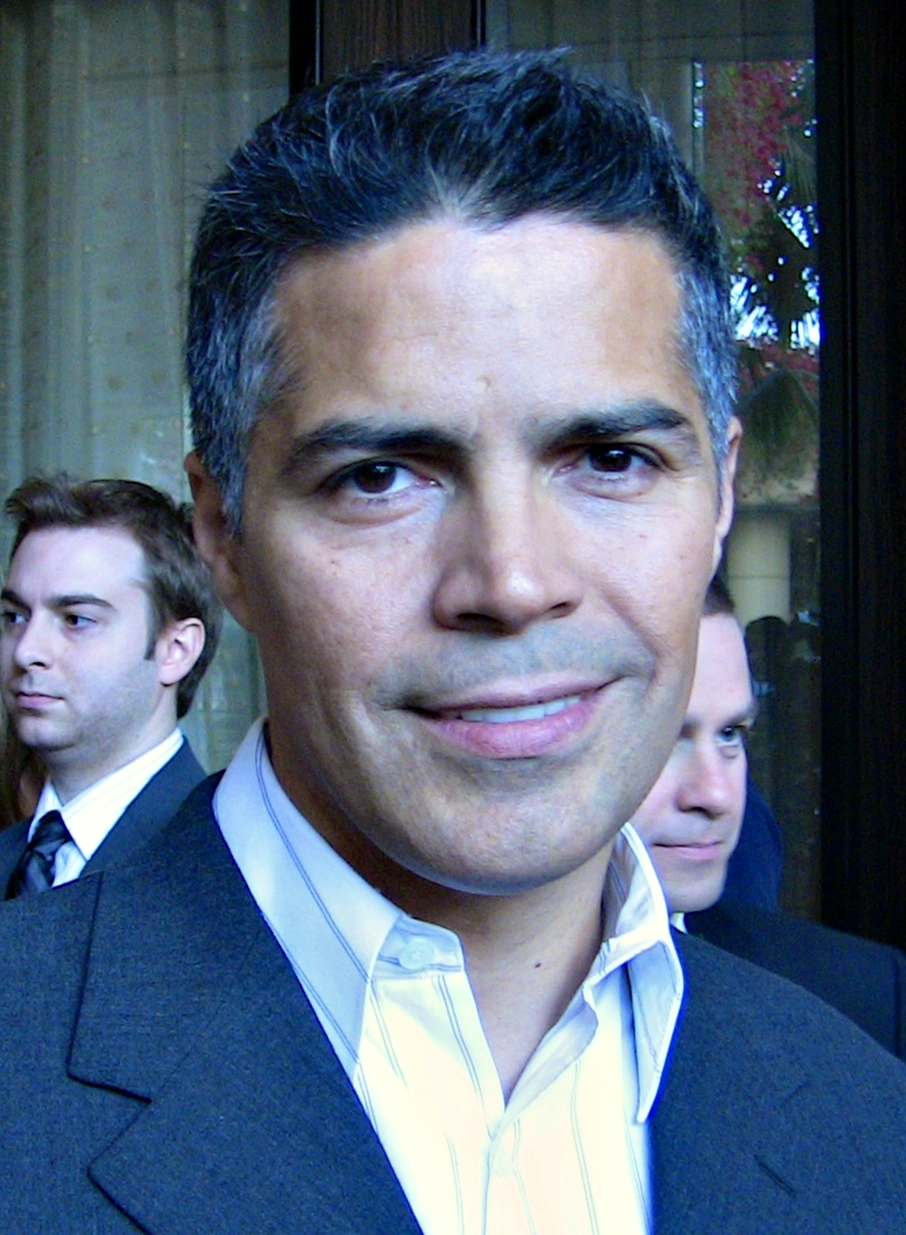
Esai Morales won an ALMA Award for his performance on the series.

The American Latino Media Arts Award, commonly known as the ALMA Award, is an annual accolade bestowed by the National Council of La Raza recognizing American Latino contributions to television, film and music. Jimmy Smits, of Puerto Rican descent, won three awards for his role in the series while Esai Morales, also of Puerto Rican descent, won an award for Outstanding Actor in a Television Series in 2002.

Year	Category	Nominee(s)	Result	Ref
1996	Outstanding Drama Series		Won	
1996	Outstanding Actor in a Drama Series	Nicholas Turturro	Nominated	
1996	Outstanding Television Series Actor in a Crossover Role	Jimmy Smits	Won	
1998	Outstanding Drama Series		Won	
1998	Outstanding Individual Performance in a Television Series in a Crossover Role	Jimmy Smits	Won	
1999	Outstanding Drama Series		Won	
1999	Outstanding Individual Performance in a Television Series in a Crossover Role	Jimmy Smits	Won	
2002	Outstanding Actor in a Television Series	Esai Morales	Won	
2002	Outstanding Supporting Actress in a Television Series	Jacqueline Obradors	Nominated	

=== American Society of Cinematographers ===
The American Society of Cinematographers Awards was created in 1986 by the American Society of Cinematographers. It honors work in theatrical features, television projects and student films, and cinematographers and other filmmakers for their career achievements. NYPD Blue received six award nominations, five for Outstanding Achievement in Cinematography in Regular Series and one for Outstanding Achievement in Cinematography in Movies of the Week/Pilots.

Year	Category	Nominee(s)	Episode(s)	Result	Ref
1993	Outstanding Achievement in Cinematography in Regular Series	Brian J. Reynolds	for "Oscar Mayer Weiner"	Nominated	
1993	Outstanding Achievement in Cinematography in Regular Series	Bing Sokolsky	for "True Confessions"	Nominated	
1993	Outstanding Achievement in Cinematography in Movies of the Week/Pilots	Bing Sokolsky		Nominated	
1994	Outstanding Achievement in Cinematography in Regular Series	Brian J. Reynolds	for "You Bet Your Life"	Nominated	
1995	Outstanding Achievement in Cinematography in Regular Series	Brian J. Reynolds	for "Heavin' Can Wait"	Nominated	
1998	Outstanding Achievement in Cinematography in Regular Series	Brian J. Reynolds	for "Closing Time"	Nominated	

=== Artios Awards ===
Presented by the Casting Society of America since 1985, the Artios Awards is an annual accolade that honors excellence in casting. NYPD Blue received seven nominations for the award for Best Casting for TV, Dramatic Episodic during its tenure. The series won in 1994, as well as winning for Best Casting for TV, Pilot.

Year	Category	Nominee(s)	Result	Ref
1994	Best Casting for TV, Pilot	Junie Lowry-Johnson and Alexa Fogel	Won	
1994	Best Casting for TV, Dramatic Episodic	Junie Lowry-Johnson and Alexa Fogel	Won	
1995	Best Casting for TV, Dramatic Episodic	Junie Lowry Johnson, Alexa L. Fogel, Susan Bluestein, Donna Eckholdt	Nominated	
1996	Best Casting for TV, Dramatic Episodic	Junie Lowry-Johnson and Alexa Fogel	Nominated	
1997	Best Casting for TV, Dramatic Episodic	Junie Lowry-Johnson and Alexa Fogel	Nominated	
1998	Best Casting for TV, Dramatic Episodic	Junie Lowry-Johnson	Nominated	
1999	Best Casting for TV, Dramatic Episodic	Junie Lowry-Johnson and Scott Genkinger	Nominated	
2001	Best Casting for TV, Dramatic Episodic	Junie Lowry-Johnson and Scott Genkinger	Nominated	

=== BMI Film & TV Awards ===
Year	Category	Nominee(s)	Result	Ref
1994	BMI TV Music Award	Mike Post	Won	
1995	BMI TV Music Award	Mike Post and Danny Lux	Won	
1996	BMI TV Music Award	Mike Post and Danny Lux	Won	
1997	BMI TV Music Award	Mike Post and Ian Dye	Won	
1998	BMI TV Music Award	Ian Dye	Won	
1998	BMI TV Music Award	Mike Post	Won	
1999	BMI TV Music Award	Ian Dye	Won	
1999	BMI TV Music Award	Mike Post	Won	
2000	BMI TV Music Award	Ian Dye and Mike Post	Won	
2001	BMI TV Music Award	Mike Post	Won	
2001	BMI TV Music Award	Edward Rogers	Won	
2002	BMI TV Music Award	Mike Post	Won	
2002	BMI TV Music Award	Edward Rogers	Won	
2003	BMI TV Music Award	Mike Post	Won	
2003	BMI TV Music Award	Edward Rogers	Won	

=== Cinema Audio Society Awards ===
The Cinema Audio Society Awards, commonly abbreviated as a CAS Awards, was created in 1964 and honors outstanding achievement in sound mixing. NYPD Blue received eight award nominations, winning two awards for Outstanding Achievement in Sound Mixing for a Television Series for episodes "Simone Says" and "Unembraceable You."

Year	Category	Nominee(s)	Episode(s)	Result	Ref
1994	Outstanding Achievement in Sound Mixing for Television	Robert Appere, Kenneth R. Burton, Gary D. Rogers, Dan Hiland, Mark Server	for "Pilot"	Nominated	
1995	Outstanding Achievement in Sound Mixing for a Television Series	Robert Appere, Kenneth R. Burton and Joe Kentworthy	for "Simone Says"	Won	
1996	Outstanding Achievement in Sound Mixing for a Television Series	Robert Appere, Kenneth R. Burton and Joe Kentworthy	for "Heavin' Can Wait"	Nominated	
1997	Outstanding Achievement in Sound Mixing for a Television Series	Robert Appere, Kenneth R. Burton and Joe Kentworthy	for "Unembraceable You"	Won	
1998	Outstanding Achievement in Sound Mixing for a Television Series	Robert Appere, Kenneth R. Burton and Joe Kentworthy	for "Dead Man Walking"	Nominated	
1999	Outstanding Achievement in Sound Mixing for a Television Series	Elmo Ponsdomenech, J. Stanley Johnston and Joe Kenworthy	for "Hearts and Souls"	Nominated	
2002	Outstanding Sound Mixing for Television - Series	Pete Elia, J. Stanley Johnston and Joe Kenworthy	for "Johnny Got His Gold"	Nominated	
2004	Outstanding Achievement in Sound Mixing for Television - Series	Pete Elia, Kurt Kassulke and Joe Kenworthy	for "Shear Stupidity"	Nominated	

=== Directors Guild of America Awards ===
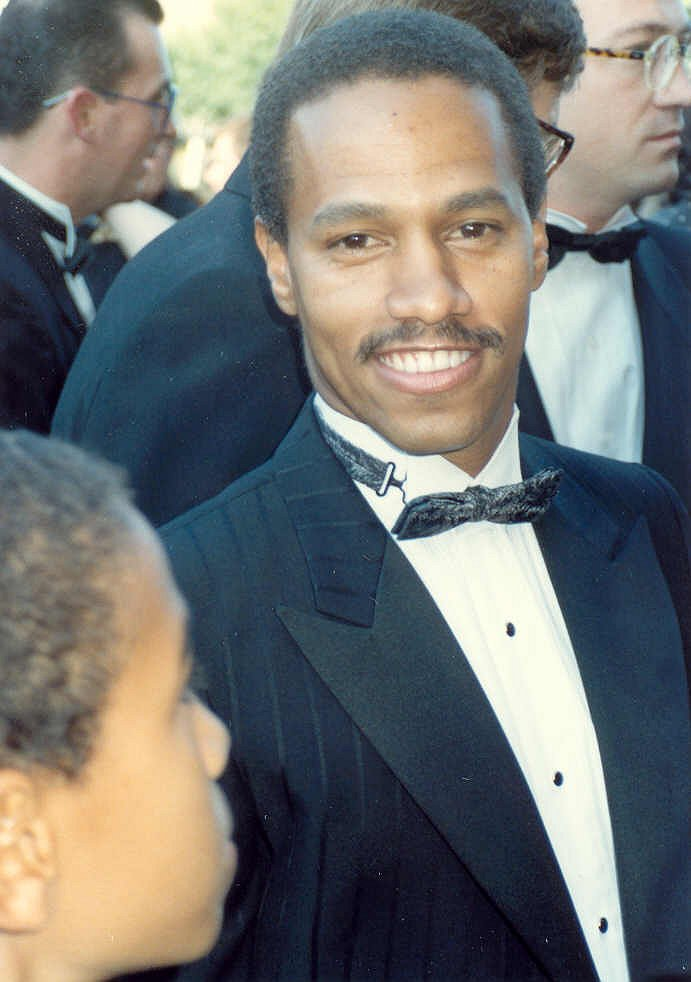
Eric Laneuville received a DGA Award nomination for his work on the "From Hare to Eternity."

Presented by the Directors Guild of America since 1938, The Directors Guild of America Award honors excellence in the field of direction. NYPD Blue received eight nominations for the award for Outstanding Directorial Achievement in Drama Series, winning two.

Year	Category	Nominee(s)	Episodes(s)	Result	Ref
1993	Outstanding Directorial Achievement in Drama Series	Charles Haid	for "True Confessions"	Nominated	
1993	Outstanding Directorial Achievement in Drama Series	Gregory Hoblit	for "Pilot"	Won	
1993	Outstanding Directorial Achievement in Drama Series	Eric Laneuville	for "From Hare to Eternity"	Nominated	
1994	Outstanding Directorial Achievement in Drama Series	Gregory Hoblit	for "Simon Says"	Nominated	
1996	Outstanding Directorial Achievement in Drama Series	Donna Deitch	for "These Old Bones"	Nominated	
1996	Outstanding Directorial Achievement in Drama Series	Mark Tinker	for "A Death in the Family"	Nominated	
1998	Outstanding Directorial Achievement in Drama Series	Paris Barclay	for "Hearts and Souls"	Won	
1998	Outstanding Directorial Achievement in Drama Series	Mark Tinker	for "Danny Boy"	Nominated	

=== Edgar Allan Poe Awards ===
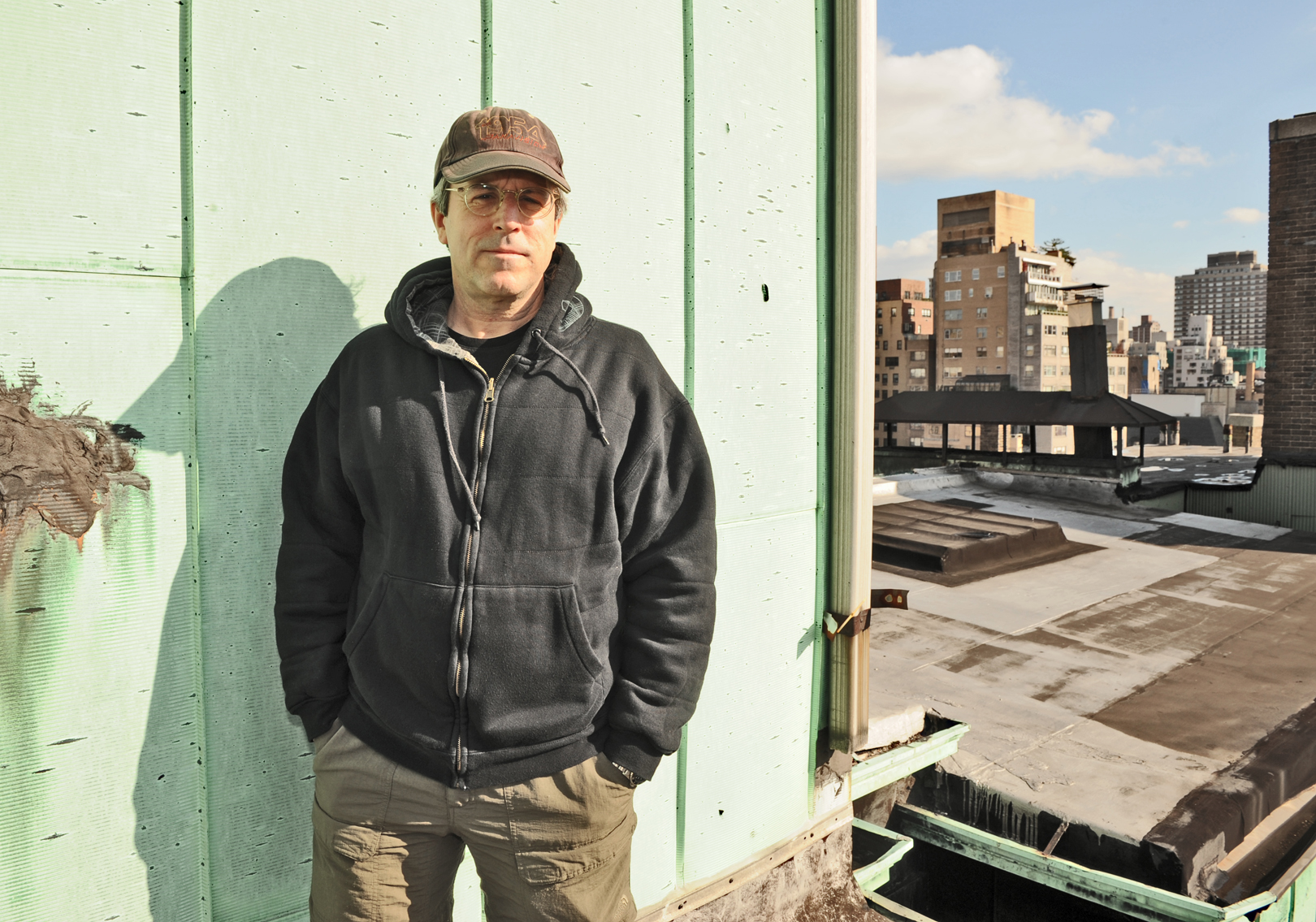
René Balcer won an Edgar Award for his work on the episode "4B or Not 4B."

Presented by the Mystery Writers of America since 1954, the Edgar Allan Poe Awards are awarded to the best in mystery fiction, non-fiction, television, film, and theater. Receiving five nominations during its tenure, NYPD Blue won three awards for Best Television Episode.

Year	Category	Nominee(s)	Episodes(s)	Result	Ref
1994	Best Television Episode	René Balcer, Michael S. Chernuchin and David Milch	for "4B or Not 4B"	Won	
1995	Best Television Episode	Steven Bochco, Walon Green and David Milch	for "Simone Says"	Won	
1996	Best Television Episode	Theresa Rebeck	for "Torah! Torah! Torah!"	Won	
2002	Best Television Episode	Steven Bochco, Bill Clark and Nicholas Wootton	for "Johnny Got His Gold"	Nominated	
2003	Best Television Episode	Bill Clark and Nicholas Wootton	for "Ho Down"	Nominated	

=== Emmy Awards ===
The Primetime Emmy Award is an annual accolade presented by the Academy of Television Arts & Sciences for outstanding achievement in American prime time television programming. The Primetime Emmy Award recognizes outstanding achievement in aspects such as acting, writing, and direction while the more technical aspects such as cinematography, casting and, as of 2011, guest acting performances in television, are awarded at the Creative Arts Emmy Awards. During its tenure, NYPD Blue received 84 nominations, winning 20 of them. NYPD Blue won the award for Outstanding Drama Series in 1995 while receiving nominations from 1994 to 1999. Dennis Franz received a nomination for Outstanding Lead Actor in a Drama Series every between 1994 and 2001, winning four times in 1994, 1996, 1997, and 1999. Jimmy Smits was also nominated in the category five consecutive times between 1995 and 1999. The series was nominated for Outstanding Supporting Actor in a Drama Series four times, with Nicholas Turturro receiving nods in 1994 and 1997, James McDaniel in 1996, and Gordon Clapp in 1998. The show also received nominations for Outstanding Supporting Actress in a Drama Series from 1994 to 1999, with Sharon Lawrence and Gail O'Grady contending for the award in 1994 to 1996. Kim Delaney was nominated in the category consecutively from 1997 to 1999, winning in 1997. Amy Brenneman was also nominated for the award during the first season and was nominated for Outstanding Guest Actress in a Drama Series during season two. Shirley Knight won the award for Outstanding Guest Actress in a Drama Series in 1995 while Debra Monk won the award in 1999. The award for Outstanding Directing for a Drama Series was awarded to Paris Barclay in 1998 and 1999, Daniel Sackheim in 1994 and Mark Tinker in 1997. NYPD Blue won the award for Outstanding Writing for a Drama Series in 1994 to Ann Biderman, in 1997 to David Milch, Stephen Gaghan, and Michael R. Perry, and in 1998 to David Milch, Nicholas Wootton and Bill Clark.

==== Primetime Emmy Awards ====
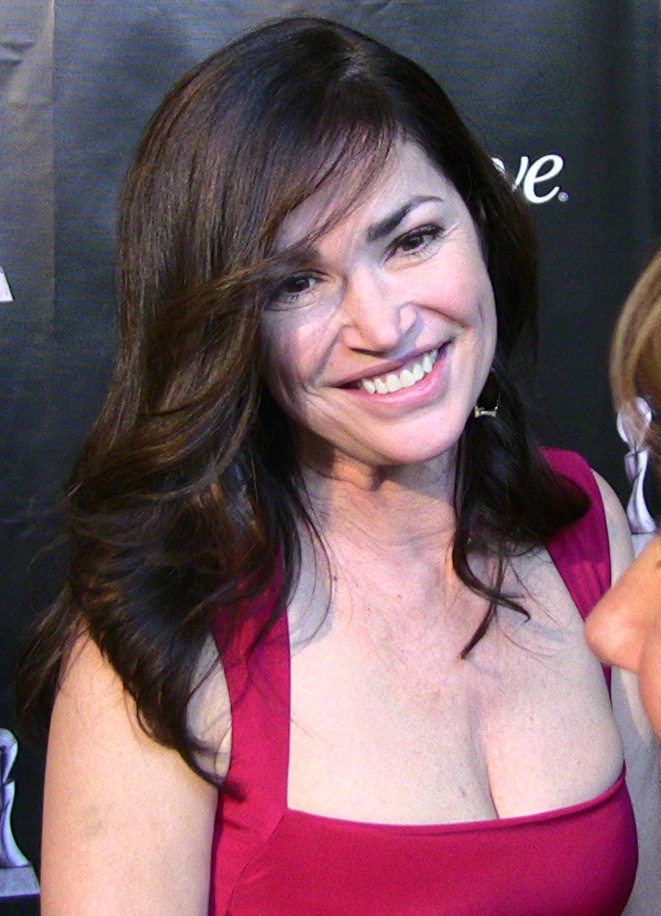
Kim Delaney won an Emmy Award for her performance on the series.

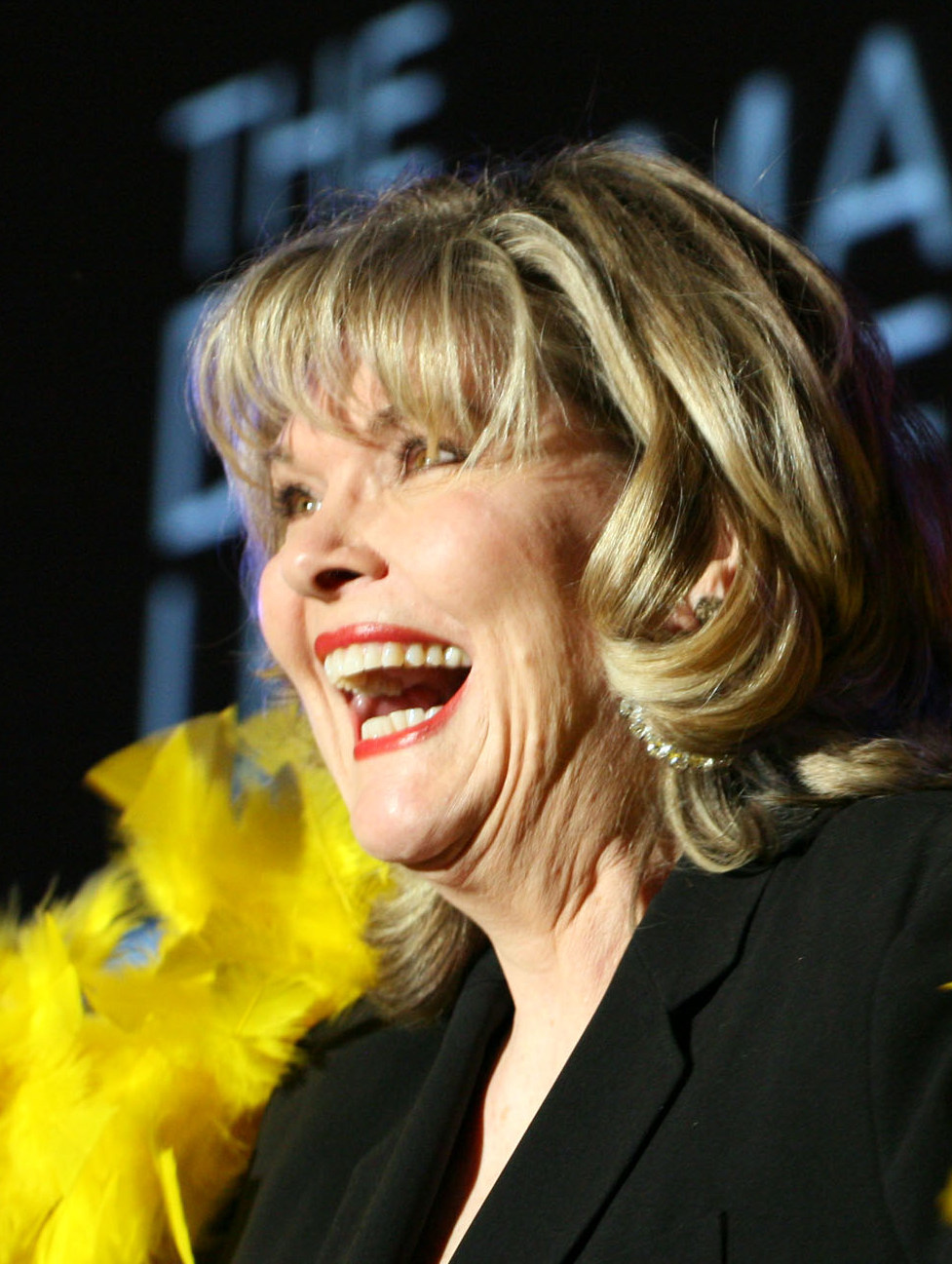
Debra Monk won an Emmy award for her performance as Katie Sipowicz.

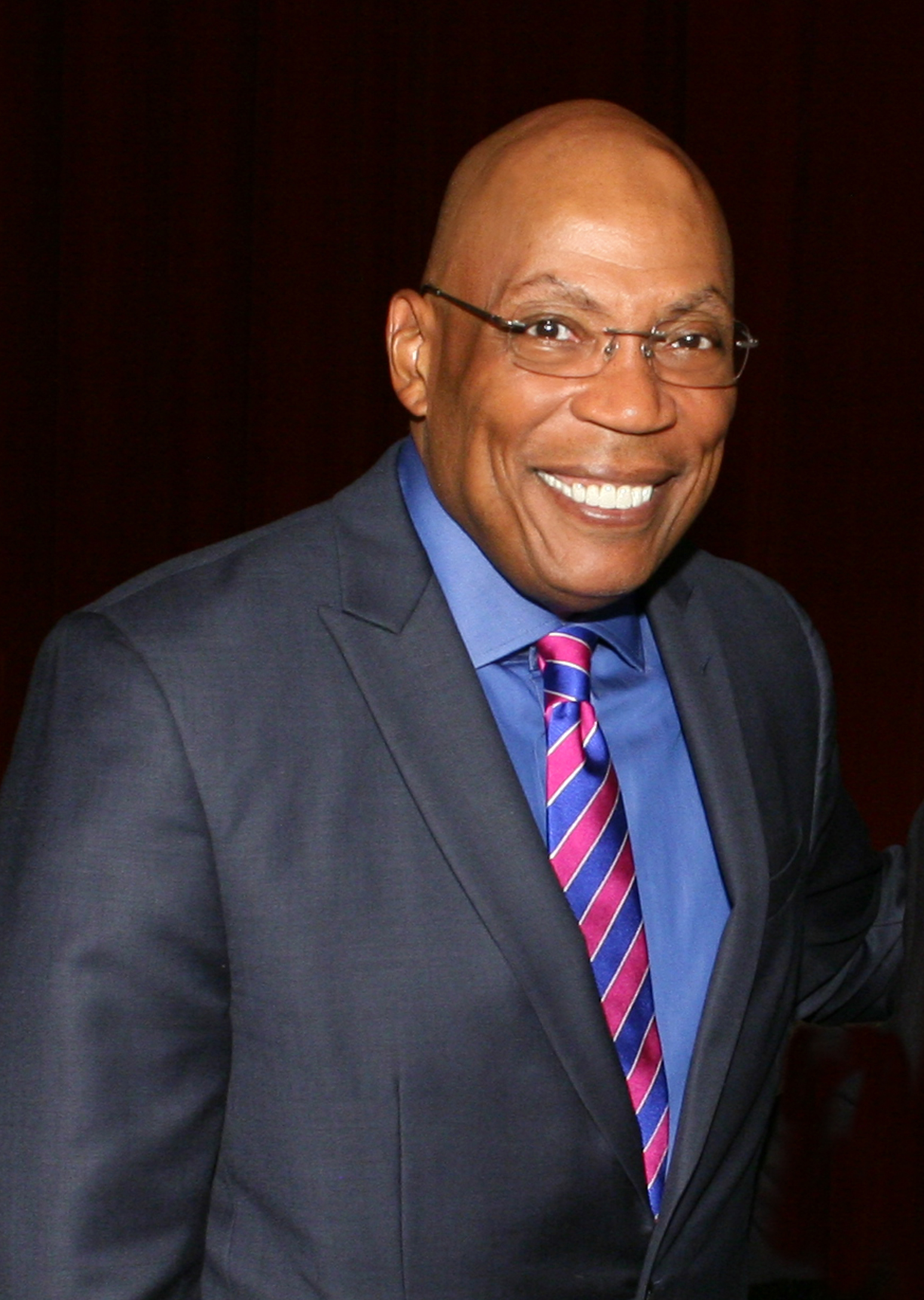
Paris Barclay won two Emmy awards for Outstanding Directing in a Drama Series.

Year	Category	Nominee(s)	Episodes(s)	Result	Ref
1994	Outstanding Drama Series			Nominated	
1994	Outstanding Lead Actor in a Drama Series	David Caruso as John Kelly	for "Pilot"	Nominated	
1994	Outstanding Lead Actor in a Drama Series	Dennis Franz as Andy Sipowicz	for "NYPD Lou"	Won	
1994	Outstanding Supporting Actor in a Drama Series	Nicholas Turturro as "James Martinez"	for "Up on the Roof" + "Guns ‘N’ Rosaries"	Nominated	
1994	Outstanding Supporting Actress in a Drama Series	Amy Brenneman as "Janice Licalsi"	for "4B or Not 4B" + "Guns ‘N’ Rosaries"	Nominated	
1994	Outstanding Supporting Actress in a Drama Series	Sharon Lawrence as "Sylvia Costas"	for "Steroid Roy" + "Good Time Charlie"	Nominated	
1994	Outstanding Supporting Actress in a Drama Series	Gail O'Grady as Donna Abandando	for "Ice Follies" + "Abandando Abandoned"	Nominated	
1994	Outstanding Guest Actor in a Drama Series	Dan Hedaya as "Lou the Werewolf"	for "NYPD Lou"	Nominated	
1994	Outstanding Guest Actress in a Drama Series	Penny Fuller as "Roberta Taub"	for "Serge the Consierge"	Nominated	
1994	Outstanding Individual Achievement in Directing in a Drama Series	Charles Haid	for "True Confessions"	Nominated	
1994	Outstanding Individual Achievement in Directing in a Drama Series	Gregory Hoblit	for "Pilot"	Nominated	
1994	Outstanding Individual Achievement in Directing in a Drama Series	Michael M. Robin	for "Guns ‘N’ Rosaries"	Nominated	
1994	Outstanding Individual Achievement in Directing in a Drama Series	Daniel Sackheim	for "Tempest in a C-Cup"	Won	
1994	Outstanding Individual Achievement in Writing in a Drama Series	Burton Armus	for "Personal Foul"	Nominated	
1994	Outstanding Individual Achievement in Writing in a Drama Series	Ann Biderman	for "Steroid Roy"	Won	
1994	Outstanding Individual Achievement in Writing in a Drama Series	Ted Mann	for "NYPD Lou"	Nominated	
1994	Outstanding Individual Achievement in Writing in a Drama Series	David Milch and Steven Bochco	for "Pilot"	Nominated	
1994	Outstanding Individual Achievement in Writing in a Drama Series	Gardner Stern	for "Tempest in a C-Cup"	Nominated	
1995	Outstanding Drama Series			Won	
1995	Outstanding Lead Actor in a Drama Series	Dennis Franz as Andy Sipowicz	for "A.D.A. Sipowicz"	Nominated	
1995	Outstanding Lead Actor in a Drama Series	Jimmy Smits as Bobby Simone	for "The Bookie and Kooky Cookie"	Nominated	
1995	Outstanding Supporting Actress in a Drama Series	Sharon Lawrence as "Sylvia Costas"	for "UnAmerican Graffiti"	Nominated	
1995	Outstanding Supporting Actress in a Drama Series	Gail O'Grady as Donna Abandando	for "A Murder with Teeth in It"	Nominated	
1995	Outstanding Guest Actress in a Drama Series	Amy Brenneman as "Janice Licalsi"	for "For Whom the Skell Tolls"	Nominated	
1995	Outstanding Guest Actress in a Drama Series	Shirley Knight as Agnes Cantwell	for "Large Mouth Bass"	Won	
1995	Outstanding Individual Achievement in Directing in a Drama Series	Mark Tinker	for "Innuendos"	Nominated	
1995	Outstanding Individual Achievement in Writing in a Drama Series	David Milch, Walon Green, Steven Bochco	for "Simone Says"	Nominated	
1996	Outstanding Drama Series			Nominated	
1996	Outstanding Lead Actor in a Drama Series	Dennis Franz as Andy Sipowicz	for "Closing Time"	Won	
1996	Outstanding Lead Actor in a Drama Series	Jimmy Smits as Bobby Simone	for "A Death in the Family"	Nominated	
1996	Outstanding Supporting Actor in a Drama Series	James McDaniel as "Arthur Fancy"	for "The Backboard Jungle"	Nominated	
1996	Outstanding Supporting Actress in a Drama Series	Sharon Lawrence as "Sylvia Costas"	for "Auntie Maimed"	Nominated	
1996	Outstanding Supporting Actress in a Drama Series	Gail O'Grady as Donna Abandando	for "A Death in the Family"	Nominated	
1996	Outstanding Individual Achievement in Directing in a Drama Series	Mark Tinker	for "The Backboard Jungle"	Nominated	
1996	Outstanding Individual Achievement in Writing in a Drama Series	Steven Bochco, Charles H. Eglee, Channing Gibson, David Milch	for "The Backboard Jungle"	Nominated	
1997	Outstanding Drama Series			Nominated	
1997	Outstanding Lead Actor in a Drama Series	Dennis Franz as Andy Sipowicz	for "Where's 'Swaldo?"	Won	
1997	Outstanding Lead Actor in a Drama Series	Jimmy Smits as Bobby Simone	for "My Wild Irish Nose"	Nominated	
1997	Outstanding Supporting Actor in a Drama Series	Nicholas Turturro as "James Martinez"	for "Where'd the Van Gogh"	Nominated	
1997	Outstanding Supporting Actress in a Drama Series	Kim Delaney as "Diane Russell"	for "Caulksmanship"	Won	
1997	Outstanding Directing for a Drama Series	Mark Tinker	for "Where's Swaldo?"	Won	
1997	Outstanding Writing for a Drama Series	David Milch, Stephen Gaghan, Michael R. Perry	for "Where's Swaldo?"	Won	
1998	Outstanding Drama Series			Nominated	
1998	Outstanding Lead Actor in a Drama Series	Dennis Franz as Andy Sipowicz	for "The One That Got Away"	Nominated	
1998	Outstanding Lead Actor in a Drama Series	Jimmy Smits as Bobby Simone	for "Lost Israel"	Nominated	
1998	Outstanding Supporting Actor in a Drama Series	Gordon Clapp as "Greg Medavoy"		Won	
1998	Outstanding Supporting Actress in a Drama Series	Kim Delaney as "Diane Russell"		Nominated	
1998	Outstanding Directing for a Drama Series	Paris Barclay	for "Lost Israel", Part 2	Won	
1998	Outstanding Writing for a Drama Series	David Milch, Ted Mann, Bill Clark and Meredith Stiehm	for "Lost Israel", Part 1	Nominated	
1998	Outstanding Writing for a Drama Series	David Milch, Nicholas Wootton and Bill Clark	for "Lost Israel", Part 2	Won	
1999	Outstanding Drama Series			Nominated	
1999	Outstanding Lead Actor in a Drama Series	Dennis Franz as Andy Sipowicz	for "Safe Home"	Won	
1999	Outstanding Lead Actor in a Drama Series	Jimmy Smits as Bobby Simone	for "Hearts and Souls"	Nominated	
1999	Outstanding Supporting Actress in a Drama Series	Kim Delaney as "Diane Russell"		Nominated	
1999	Outstanding Guest Actress in a Drama Series	Debra Monk as "Katie Sipowicz"	for "Hearts and Souls"	Won	
1999	Outstanding Directing for a Drama Series	Paris Barclay	for "Hearts and Souls"	Won	
1999	Outstanding Writing for a Drama Series	Nicholas Wootton, Steven Bochco, David Milch, and Bill Clark	for "Hearts and Souls"	Nominated	
2000	Outstanding Lead Actor in a Drama Series	Dennis Franz as Andy Sipowicz	for "The Last Round Up"	Nominated	
2001	Outstanding Lead Actor in a Drama Series	Dennis Franz as Andy Sipowicz	for "In the Wind"	Nominated	

==== Creative Arts Emmy Awards ====
Year	Category	Nominee(s)	Episode(s)	Result	Ref
1994	Outstanding Individual Achievement in Art Direction for a Series	Mary Ann Biddle and Paul Eads	for "Serge the Consierge"	Won	
1994	Outstanding Individual Achievement in Casting	Alexa L. Fogel and Junie Lowry-Johnson		Won	
1994	Outstanding Individual Achievement in Editing for a Series - Single Camera Production	Stan Allen	for "Tempest in a C-Cup"	Won	
1994	Outstanding Individual Achievement in Editing for a Series - Single Camera Production	Lawrence Jordan	for "Pilot"	Nominated	
1994	Outstanding Individual Achievement in Main Title Theme Music	Mike Post		Nominated	
1994	Outstanding Individual Achievement in Sound Editing for a Series	Ron Evans, Ken Gladden, Dennis Gray, Linda L. Keim, Albert Edmund Lord III, Patty McGettigan, Alyson Dee Moore, Nancy May Parker, and Dave Weathers	for "NYPD Lou"	Nominated	
1994	Outstanding Individual Achievement in Sound Mixing for a Drama Series	Robert Appere, Ken Burton, and Mark Server	for "Guns & Rosaries"	Nominated	
1994	Outstanding Individual Achievement in Sound Mixing for a Drama Series	Robert Appere, Dan Hiland, Gary D. Rogers and Mark Server	for "Pilot"	Nominated	
1995	Outstanding Individual Achievement in Art Direction for a Series	Mary Ann Biddle, Paul Eads and Richard C. Hankins	for "Dirty Socks"	Nominated	
1995	Outstanding Individual Achievement in Casting	Susan Bluestein, Donna Ekholdt, Alexa L. Fogel and Junie Lowry-Johnson		Won	
1995	Outstanding Individual Achievement in Cinematography for a Series	Brian J. Reynolds	for "You Bet Your Life"	Nominated	
1995	Outstanding Sound Mixing for a Drama Series	Robert Appere, Ken Burton, and Joe Kentworthy	for "Vishy Vashy Vinnie"	Nominated	
1996	Outstanding Art Direction for a Series	Richard C. Hankins, Alan Muraoka and David Smith	for "Hollie and the Blowfish"	Nominated	
1996	Outstanding Editing for a Series - Single Camera Production	Craig Bench	for "Death in a Family"	Nominated	
1996	Outstanding Sound Mixing for a Drama Series	Robert Appere, Ken Burton, and Joe Kentworthy	for "Heavin' Can Wait"	Nominated	
1997	Outstanding Art Direction for a Series	Richard C. Hankins and David Smith	for "A Wrenching Experience"	Nominated	
1997	Outstanding Casting for a Series	Alexa L. Fogel and Junie Lowry-Johnson		Nominated	
1997	Outstanding Sound Mixing for a Drama Series	Robert Appere, Ken Burton, and Joe Kentworthy	for "Unembraceable You"	Nominated	
1998	Outstanding Casting for a Series	Scott Genkinger and Junie Lowry-Johnson		Nominated	
1998	Outstanding Sound Mixing for a Drama Series	Robert Appere, Ken Burton, and Joe Kentworthy	for "A Box of Wendy"	Nominated	
1999	Outstanding Sound Mixing for a Drama Series	J. Stanley Johnston, Joe Kenworthy, and Elmo Ponsdomenech	for "Raging Bulls"	Nominated	
2000	Outstanding Sound Mixing for a Drama Series	J. Stanley Johnston, Joe Kenworthy, and Elmo Ponsdomenech	for "Along Came Jones"	Nominated	
2002	Outstanding Single Camera Sound Mixing for a Drama Series	Pete Elia, J. Stanley Johnston, and Joe Kenworthy	for "Johnny Got His Gold"	Nominated	

=== Golden Globe Awards ===
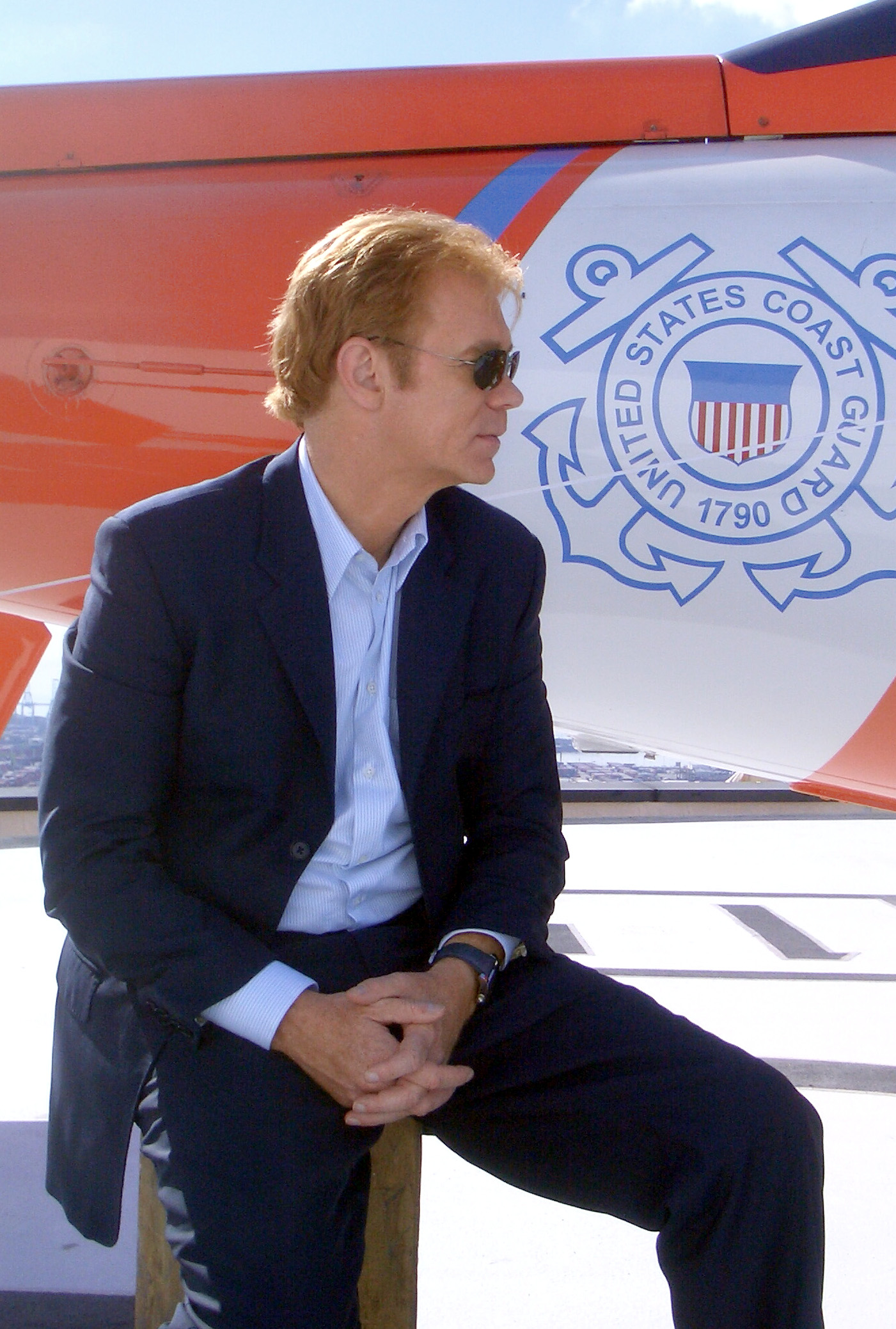
David Caruso won a Golden Globe award for his performance in NYPD Blue.

Presented since 1949, the Golden Globe Award is an annual accolade awarded by the Hollywood Foreign Press Association for outstanding achievements in film and television. NYPD Blue received 13 nominations during its tenure, winning four awards for Best Actor – Television Series Drama, awarded to David Caruso in 1994, Dennis Franz in 1995, and Jimmy Smits in 1996.

Year	Category	Nominee(s)	Result	Ref
1993	Best Television Series – Drama		Won	
1993	Best Actor – Television Series Drama	David Caruso as John Kelly	Won	
1993	Best Supporting Actor – Series, Miniseries or Television Film	Dennis Franz as Andy Sipowicz	Nominated	
1994	Best Television Series – Drama		Nominated	
1994	Best Actor – Television Series Drama	Dennis Franz as Andy Sipowicz	Won	
1995	Best Television Series – Drama		Nominated	
1995	Best Actor – Television Series Drama	Jimmy Smits as Bobby Simone	Won	
1996	Best Television Series – Drama		Nominated	
1996	Best Actor – Television Series Drama	Jimmy Smits as Bobby Simone	Nominated	
1997	Best Television Series – Drama		Nominated	
1997	Best Actress – Television Series Drama	Kim Delaney as Diane Russell	Nominated	
1998	Best Actor – Television Series Drama	Jimmy Smits as Bobby Simone	Nominated	
1998	Best Actress – Television Series Drama	Kim Delaney as Diane Russell	Nominated	

=== Golden Satellite Awards ===
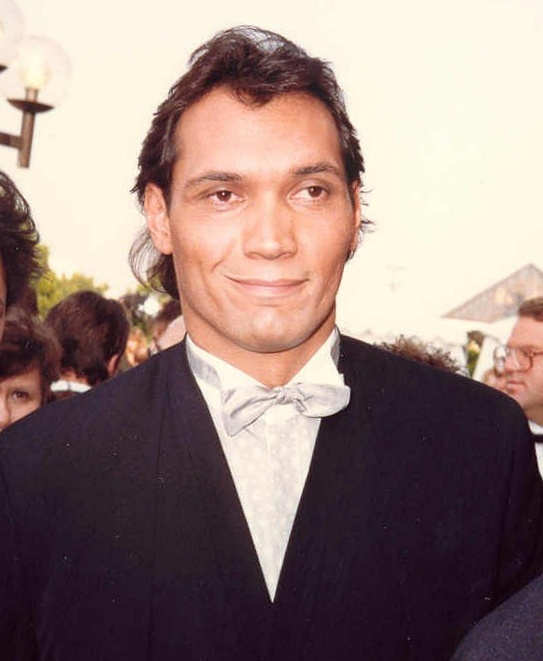
Jimmy Smits won a Golden Satellite award in 1998 for his performance as Bobby Simone.

The Satellite Award is an annual accolade bestowed by the International Press Academy since 1997 in recognition of outstanding achievements in film, television and new media. NYPD Blue won two awards (out of 11) for Best Television Series – Drama and Best Actor – Television Series Drama, awarded to Jimmy Smits, in 1998.

Year	Category	Nominee(s)	Result	Ref
1996	Best Television Series – Drama		Nominated	
1996	Best Actor – Television Series Drama	Dennis Franz as Andy Sipowicz	Nominated	
1996	Best Actress – Television Series Drama	Kim Delaney as Diane Russell	Nominated	
1996	Best Supporting Actress – Series, Miniseries or Television Film	Gail O'Grady as Donna Abandando	Nominated	
1997	Best Television Series – Drama		Won	
1997	Best Actor – Television Series Drama	Dennis Franz as Andy Sipowicz	Nominated	
1997	Best Actor – Television Series Drama	Jimmy Smits as Bobby Simone	Won	
1997	Best Actress – Television Series Drama	Kim Delaney as Diane Russell	Nominated	
1998	Best Television Series – Drama		Nominated	
1998	Best Actor – Television Series Drama	Jimmy Smits as Bobby Simone	Nominated	
1998	Best Actress – Television Series Drama	Sharon Lawrence as Sylvia Costas	Nominated	

=== Humanitas Prize ===
Awarded since 1974, the Humanitas Prize is an annual accolade that recognizes outstanding achievement of writers in film and television whose work promotes human dignity, meaning and freedom. NYPD Blue received three nominations for the award in the 60 Minute Category, winning twice in 1994 and 1997, and two nominations for the 90 Minute Category, winning once in 2000.

Year	Category	Nominee(s)	Episodes(s)	Result	Ref
1994	60 Minute Category	Burton Armus and David Milch		Won	
1997	60 Minute Category	David Mills		Won	
1998	90 Minute Category	Bill Clark, David Milch, Nicholas Wootton	for "Lost Israel", Part 2	Nominated	
1999	60 Minute Category	Steven Bochco, Bill Clark, Leonard Gardner, David Milch	for "Raging Bulls"	Nominated	
1999	90 Minute Category	Steven Bochco, Bill Clark, David Milch and Nicholas Wootton		Won	

=== Screen Actors Guild Awards ===
Presented by the Screen Actors Guild, the Screen Actors Guild (SAG) Award recognizes outstanding individual and ensemble performances. Dennis Franz won two SAG awards for his individual performance on the series while the cast won an award for Outstanding Performance by an Ensemble in a Drama Series.

Year	Category	Nominee(s)	Result	Ref
1994	Outstanding Performance by a Male Actor in a Drama Series	Dennis Franz as Andy Sipowicz	Won	
1994	Outstanding Performance by an Ensemble in a Drama Series	Gordon Clapp, Dennis Franz, Sharon Lawrence, James McDaniel, Gail O'Grady, Jimmy Smits, and Nicholas Turturro	Won	
1995	Outstanding Performance by a Male Actor in a Drama Series	Dennis Franz as Andy Sipowicz	Nominated	
1995	Outstanding Performance by a Male Actor in a Drama Series	Jimmy Smits as Bobby Simone	Nominated	
1995	Outstanding Performance by a Female Actor in a Drama Series	Sharon Lawrence as Sylvia Costas	Nominated	
1995	Outstanding Performance by an Ensemble in a Drama Series	Gordon Clapp, Kim Delaney, Dennis Franz, Sharon Lawrence, James McDaniel, Justine Miceli, Gail O'Grady, Jimmy Smits, and Nicholas Turturro	Nominated	
1996	Outstanding Performance by a Male Actor in a Drama Series	Dennis Franz as Andy Sipowicz	Won	
1996	Outstanding Performance by a Male Actor in a Drama Series	Jimmy Smits as Bobby Simone	Nominated	
1996	Outstanding Performance by a Female Actor in a Drama Series	Kim Delaney as Diane Russell	Nominated	
1996	Outstanding Performance by an Ensemble in a Drama Series	Gordon Clapp, Kim Delaney, Dennis Franz, Sharon Lawrence, James McDaniel, Justine Miceli, Gail O'Grady, Jimmy Smits, and Nicholas Turturro	Nominated	
1997	Outstanding Performance by a Male Actor in a Drama Series	Dennis Franz as Andy Sipowicz	Nominated	
1997	Outstanding Performance by a Male Actor in a Drama Series	Jimmy Smits as Bobby Simone	Nominated	
1997	Outstanding Performance by a Female Actor in a Drama Series	Kim Delaney as Diane Russell	Nominated	
1997	Outstanding Performance by an Ensemble in a Drama Series	Gordon Clapp, Kim Delaney, Dennis Franz, James McDaniel, Jimmy Smits, Andrea Thompson, and Nicholas Turturro	Nominated	
1998	Outstanding Performance by a Male Actor in a Drama Series	Dennis Franz as Andy Sipowicz	Nominated	
1998	Outstanding Performance by a Male Actor in a Drama Series	Jimmy Smits as Bobby Simone	Nominated	
1998	Outstanding Performance by a Female Actor in a Drama Series	Kim Delaney as Diane Russell	Nominated	
1998	Outstanding Performance by an Ensemble in a Drama Series	Gordon Clapp, Kim Delaney, Dennis Franz, Sharon Lawrence, James McDaniel, Jimmy Smits, Andrea Thompson, and Nicholas Turturro	Nominated	
1999	Outstanding Performance by a Male Actor in a Drama Series	Dennis Franz as Andy Sipowicz	Nominated	
1999	Outstanding Performance by a Male Actor in a Drama Series	Rick Schroder as Danny Sorenson	Nominated	
1999	Outstanding Performance by an Ensemble in a Drama Series	Bill Brochtrup, Gordon Clapp, Kim Delaney, Dennis Franz, James McDaniel, Rick Schroder, Andrea Thompson, Nicholas Turturro	Nominated	
2000	Outstanding Performance by a Male Actor in a Drama Series	Dennis Franz as Andy Sipowicz	Nominated	
2001	Outstanding Performance by a Male Actor in a Drama Series	Dennis Franz as Andy Sipowicz	Nominated	

=== Television Critics Association Awards ===
Awarded since 1984, the TCA Award is an annual accolade presented by the Television Critics Association in recognition of excellence in television. Out of 13 nominations, NYPD Blue won the award for Outstanding Achievement in Drama in 1994.

Year	Category	Nominee(s)	Result	Ref
1994	Program of the Year		Nominated	
1994	Outstanding Achievement in Drama		Won	
1995	Outstanding Achievement in Drama		Nominated	
1996	Program of the Year		Nominated	
1996	Outstanding Achievement in Drama		Nominated	
1997	Outstanding Achievement in Drama		Nominated	
1997	Individual Achievement in Drama	Dennis Franz	Nominated	
1998	Individual Achievement in Drama	Dennis Franz	Nominated	
1999	Program of the Year		Nominated	
1999	Outstanding Achievement in Drama		Nominated	
1999	Individual Achievement in Drama	Dennis Franz	Nominated	

=== TV Land Awards ===
The TV Land Award is an award presented at the eponymous award ceremony, airing on TV Land, that honors television programs that are off air. Receiving 13 nominations since the first award ceremony, The Mary Tyler Moore Show won five awards, including Groundbreaking Show and Broadcaster of the Year, the latter posthumously awarded to Ted Knight three times.

Year	Category	Nominee(s)	Result	Ref
1999	Favorite Drama Series		Nominated	
1999	Favorite Actor in a Drama	Dennis Franz	Nominated	
1999	Favorite Actor in a Drama	Jimmy Smits	Nominated	
1999	Favorite Actress in a Drama	Kim Delaney	Nominated	
2000	Favorite Actor in a Drama	Dennis Franz	Nominated	
2001	Supporting Actor of the Year in a Drama Series	Ricky Schroder	Nominated	

=== Viewers for Quality Television Awards ===
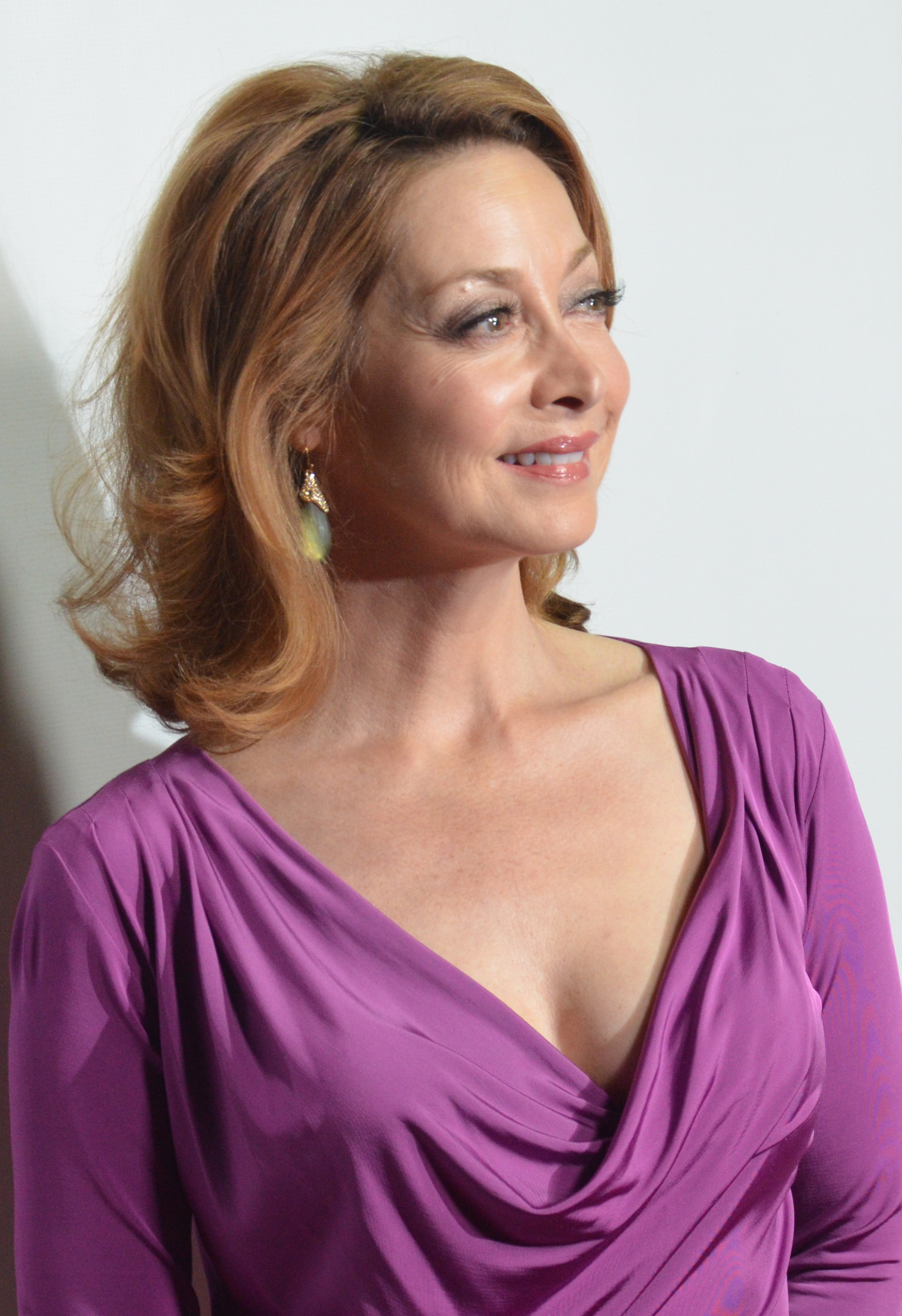
Sharon Lawrence was nominated for two Q Awards during the series' tenure.

The Q Award, presented by the Viewers for Quality Television, honors programs and performers that the organization deem are of the highest quality. Out of 25 nominations, NYPD Blue won six awards – one for Best Quality Drama Series and five for Best Actor in a Quality Drama Series, awarded to Dennis Franz.

Year	Category	Nominee(s)	Result	Ref
1994	Best Quality Drama Series		Won	
1994	Best Actor in a Quality Drama Series	David Caruso	Nominated	
1994	Best Actor in a Quality Drama Series	Dennis Franz	Won	
1994	Best Supporting Actress in a Quality Drama Series	Amy Brenneman	Nominated	
1994	Best Supporting Actress in a Quality Drama Series	Sharon Lawrence	Nominated	
1994	Specialty Player	Wendy Makkena	Nominated	
1995	Best Quality Drama Series		Nominated	
1995	Best Actor in a Quality Drama Series	Dennis Franz	Nominated	
1995	Best Supporting Actress in a Quality Drama Series	Sharon Lawrence	Nominated	
1995	Best Supporting Actress in a Quality Drama Series	Gail O'Grady	Nominated	
1996	Best Actor in a Quality Drama Series	Dennis Franz	Won	
1997	Best Quality Drama Series		Nominated	
1997	Best Actor in a Quality Drama Series	Dennis Franz	Won	
1997	Best Actor in a Quality Drama Series	Jimmy Smits	Nominated	
1997	Best Supporting Actress in a Quality Drama Series	Kim Delaney	Nominated	
1998	Best Quality Drama Series		Nominated	
1998	Best Actor in a Quality Drama Series	Dennis Franz	Won	
1998	Best Supporting Actress in a Quality Drama Series	Kim Delaney	Nominated	
1998	Best Recurring Player	Sharon Lawrence	Nominated	
1999	Best Quality Drama Series		Nominated	
1999	Best Actor in a Quality Drama Series	Dennis Franz	Won	
1999	Best Actor in a Quality Drama Series	Ricky Schroder	Nominated	
1999	Best Supporting Actor in a Quality Drama Series	James McDaniel	Nominated	
1999	Best Supporting Actress in a Quality Drama Series	Kim Delaney	Nominated	
2000	Best Actor in a Quality Drama Series	Dennis Franz	Nominated	
2000	Best Supporting Actress in a Quality Drama Series	Kim Delaney	Nominated	

=== Young Artist Awards ===
The Young Artist Award is an annual accolade presented by the Young Artist Association in recognition of outstanding achievements by performers aged 5 to 21 in film, television, theater and music. Austin Majors, who portrayed Andy Sipowicz's son Theo, received four award nominations, winning once for Best Performance in a TV Series (Comedy or Drama) - Young Actor Age Ten or Under.

Year	Category	Nominee(s)	Result	Ref
1994-1995	Best Performance by a Young Actress - Guest Starring Role TV Series	Kyndra Joy Casper	Nominated	
1998-1999	Best Performance in a TV Drama Series - Supporting Young Actor	Courtland Mead	Nominated	
2001	Best Performance in a TV Series (Comedy or Drama) - Young Actor Age Ten or Under	Austin Majors	Won	
2002	Best Performance in a TV Series (Comedy or Drama) - Young Actor Age Ten or Under	Austin Majors	Nominated	
2003	Best Performance in a TV Series (Comedy or Drama) - Young Actor Age Ten or Under	Austin Majors	Nominated	
2004	Best Performance in a Television Series - Recurring Young Actor	Austin Majors	Nominated	

=== Other awards ===
Award	Year	Category	Nominee	Result	Ref
American Cinema Editors Awards	1994	Best Edited One-Hour Series for Television	Lawrence Jordan for "Pilot"	Nominated	
American Cinema Editors Awards	1999	Best Edited One-Hour Series for Television	Jane Kass for "Hearts and Souls"	Won	
ADG Excellence in Production Design Awards	1996	Excellence in Production Design for a Television Series	Richard Hankins, Alan Muraoka and Lauren Crasco	Nominated	
Banff Television Festival	1999	Best Television Episode	for "Hearts and Souls"	Won	
GLAAD Media Awards	1996	Outstanding Television Series		Won	
GLAAD Media Awards	1998	Outstanding TV Drama Series		Won	
Golden Reel Awards	1998	Best Sound Editing - Television Episodic - Dialogue & ADR		Nominated	
Golden Reel Awards	2000	Best Sound Editing - Television Episodic - Dialogue & ADR	Jeff Rosen, Helen Luttrell, John Green, Lukas Bower, Russell DeWolf, Sonya Henry, Jane Boegel, Barbara J. Boguski for "Voir Dire This"	Nominated	
Golden Reel Awards	2002	Best Sound Editing in Television - Dialogue & ADR, Episodic	Jeff Rosen, Patrick Hogan, David Beadle, Ralph Osborn III for "Johnny Got His Gold"	Nominated	
Golden Reel Awards	2003	Best Sound Editing in Television Episodic - Dialogue & ADR	Jeff Rosen, H. Jay Levine, Todd Niesen for "Below the Belt"	Nominated	
NAACP Image Award	1997	Outstanding Drama Series		Nominated	
NAACP Image Award	1998	Outstanding Supporting Actor in a Drama Series	James McDaniel	Nominated	
NAACP Image Award	1999	Outstanding Supporting Actor in a Drama Series	James McDaniel	Nominated	
NAACP Image Award	2000	Outstanding Supporting Actor in a Drama Series	James McDaniel	Nominated	
Imagen Awards	2003	Best Primetime Drama Series - Television		Won	
Peabody Award	1996	ABC, Steven Bochco Productions		Won	
Peabody Award	1998	ABC, Steven Bochco Productions		Won	
People's Choice Awards	1993	Favorite TV Dramatic Series		Won	
People's Choice Awards	1993	Favorite New TV Dramatic Series		Won	
PRISM Awards	2004	Performance in a Drama Series Episode	Dennis Franz	Won	
PRISM Awards	2004	Performance in a Drama Series Episode	Lori Petty	Nominated	
PRISM Awards	2005	Performance in a Drama Series Episode	Mark-Paul Gosselaar	Nominated	
Producers Guild of America Awards	1993	Best Episodic Drama	Steven Bochco, David Milch, Gregory Hoblit	Won	
TV Land Awards	2007	TV Moment That Became Headline News	Amy Brenneman for appearing nude in the pilot episode	Nominated	
Writers Guild of America Awards	1994	Television: Episodic Drama	Steven Bochco and David Milch for "Pilot"	Nominated	
Writers Guild of America Awards	1994	Television: Episodic Drama	Gardner Stern for "Tempest in a C-Cup"	Nominated	
Writers Guild of America Awards	1996	Television: Episodic Drama	Bill Clark and Theresa Rebeck for "Girl Talk"	Won	
