= NYPD Blue season 2 =

Season of television series

NYPD Blue
- Season 2
- Season 2 U.S. DVD cover
- No. of episodes: 22

Release
- Original network: ABC
- Original release: October 11, 1994 – May 23, 1995

Season chronology
- ← Previous; Season 1 Next → Season 3

The second season of NYPD Blue, an American television police drama set in New York City, aired as part of the 1994–95 United States network television schedule for ABC, premiering on October 11, 1994, and concluding on May 23, 1995. The show explores the internal and external struggles of the fictional 15th precinct of Manhattan. Each episode typically intertwines several plots involving an ensemble cast.

The season earned three Primetime Emmy Awards, one for "Outstanding Drama Series", another for "Outstanding Guest Actress in a Drama Series" (Shirley Knight), and a Creative Arts Emmy for its casting. The show received an additional 10 nominations.

== Production ==
In the hiatus between Seasons 1 and 2, David Caruso reportedly demanded a raise from $40,000 per episode to around $100,000/per, and also that the show simultaneously shift the series back to a primary focus on his Det. John Kelly (away from the S1 balance between Caruso/Kelly and Dennis Franz/Andy Sipowicz focal points) while giving him mandated time off to film movies in-season. David Milch and Steven Bochco agreed that they could not work with Caruso anymore and informed him that he would be permanently written off the series before Season 2 began. After intense negotiations, Caruso and Milch/Bochco reached an agreement for four episodes of work to write off Kelly to start Season 2. By this point, the show had cast Jimmy Smits to play Andy's new partner, Det. Bobby Simone.

== Plot summary ==
Licalsi is found guilty of the manslaughter of Marino and his driver and is given a two-year sentence. Because of his involvement with Licalsi, and the belief that he withheld evidence that could have given her a longer sentence, Kelly is transferred out of the 15th and chooses to leave the department altogether. He is replaced by Bobby Simone, a widower whose previous job was that of driver for the Police Commissioner. This does not sit well with Sipowicz but in time he learns to accept his new partner and, as his relationship with Sylvia leads down the aisle, asks Simone to be his best man.

After an affair with a journalist who uses information that he gives her in an article, Simone begins a relationship with another new officer in the squad, Diane Russell. Sipowicz, a recovering alcoholic, recognizes in Russell's behavior that she also has a problem and, after much prompting, she herself goes to AA. Elsewhere, due to his lack of self-belief that a woman like Donna could love him, Medavoy's relationship with her breaks down, due in no small part to Donna's visiting sister.

== Cast ==
Actor	Character	Main cast	Recurring cast
David Caruso	John Kelly	episodes 1–4	—N/a
Jimmy Smits	Bobby Simone	episodes 5–22	—N/a
Dennis Franz	Andy Sipowicz	entire season	—N/a
James McDaniel	Arthur Fancy	entire season	—N/a
Amy Brenneman	Janice Licalsi	episodes 1–2	—N/a
Nicholas Turturro	James Martinez	entire season	—N/a
Sharon Lawrence	Sylvia Costas	entire season	—N/a
Gordon Clapp	Greg Medavoy	entire season	—N/a
Gail O'Grady	Donna Abandando	entire season	—N/a
Justine Miceli	Adrienne Lesniak	—N/a	episodes 3–5, 7, 9–15, 17, 22
Kim Delaney	Diane Russell	—N/a	episodes 19–22
Bill Brochtrup	John Irvin	—N/a	episodes 17–22

=== Recurring guest roles ===
Season 2's recurring guest roles include:

- Justine Miceli was introduced as Det. Adrienne Lesniak during the season, in a recurring role as the partner of Det. James Martinez. Miceli became a cast member during the following season.
- Kim Delaney as Det. Diane Russell; Delaney also became a cast member starting at the end of second season.
- Melina Kanakaredes played an ambitious reporter, Benita Alden, who becomes romantically involved with Det. Bobby Simone, the first such relationship Simone has after his wife died. Simone helps Alden break a story about a major case, though the relationship ends several episodes later when information Simone mentions to her during pillow talk is leaked to the press the next day, resulting in the suicide of a cop.
- Peter Boyle played Dan Breen, a retired officer and Sipowicz's AA sponsor.
- Debra Messing played Dana Abandando, the sister of Donna Abandando.

== Episodes ==
Each episode entry includes its original airdate in the United States, the writing and directing credits, and a plot summary.

No. overall	No. in season	Title	Directed by	Written by	Original release date	Prod. code	U.S. viewers (millions)
23	1	"Trials & Tribulations"	Gregory Hoblit	Story by : Steven Bochco & David Milch; Teleplay by : Ted Mann	October 11, 1994	0V01/5201	24.3
Detective Licalsi wants to plea bargain and accept a six-year prison term for her actions, but Kelly opposes that — even though it may mean compromising his own integrity. He's motivated by the realization that he's still in love with Janice — a fact which leads to his breakup with Robin Wirkus. In a neighborhood which has suffered a rash of recent robberies, Kelly and Sipowicz stake out an apartment building, and are stunned to find two of their fellow cops are involved in the crimes. Andy suffers when his AA sponsor won't let him resume dating Sylvia Costas. He also confronts a wife-beater whose spouse keeps dropping charges against him.
24	2	"For Whom the Skell Rolls"	Michael M. Robin	Story by : Steven Bochco & David Milch; Teleplay by : Gardner Stern	October 18, 1994	0V02/5202	22.1
Janice Licalsi takes the stand in her own murder trial — with critical testimony. In other developments, the Internal Affairs Bureau investigates Kelly and Sipowicz for their roles in the apprehension and arrest of Officers Guyce and Quint for robbery; and Kelly, Sipowicz, Martinez and Medavoy are involved in the probe of the mysterious murder of a black couple. Sleazy journalist Norman Gardner trashes Kelly again but thanks to disgraced ex-cop Mike Roberts, Andy finds a way to get Norman to shut up. And Inspector Haverill screws with a deal Kelly made with a witness, only to OK the deal once Kelly has insulted him and given him "what he needs". Note: Last appearance of Amy Brenneman as Janice Licalsi.
25	3	"Cop Suey"	Mark Tinker	Charles H. Eglee & Channing Gibson	October 25, 1994	0V03/5203	24.7
In his probe into the killing of an off-duty cop in Chinatown, Kelly reluctantly accepts the cooperation of a Chinese gangleader and briefly annoys Det. Harold Ng (Tzi Ma). Andy is enraged when the beaten wife from the season premiere turns up dead. A new cop named Adrienne Lesniak arrives at the 15th; Andy briefly clashes with her over the case before they are able to work together to get a confession in the case. The other cops learn Adrienne has an ex-boyfriend who's a mean-spirited, jealous type. Note: First appearance of Justine Miceli as Adrienne Lesniak.
26	4	"Dead and Gone"	Daniel Sackheim	Leonard Gardner	November 1, 1994	0V04/5204	28.8
The future of Detective John Kelly with the force is finally and irrevocably decided. An 18-month-old baby riding in a car driven by one Duane Rollins (Michael Imperioli) is shot and killed by a drive-by assailant. Rollins says it was a random shooting, but Kelly thinks Rollins was the intended victim. Sipowicz finds the body of a fellow cop in a compromising position, and at the same time, he tries to balance his personal life between the requirements of Alcoholics Anonymous and his romantic feelings toward Sylvia Costas. Note: Last appearance of David Caruso as John Kelly.
27	5	"Simone Says"	Gregory Hoblit	Story by : Steven Bochco & David Milch & Walon Green; Teleplay by : David Milch & Walon Green	November 15, 1994	0V07/5207	25.7
Detective Bobby Simone joins the precinct and is immediately assigned with Sipowicz to investigate the mysterious murder of a notorious mobster's son. Also at the precinct, Detective Lesniak's over-the-edge ex-boyfriend, Detective Jimmy Abruzzo, threatens her with a gun; and a woman named Mrs. Davis arrives with suspicions that her husband is molesting their 14-year-old daughter, Allison. Notes: First appearance of Jimmy Smits as Bobby Simone.; Bochco, Milch, and Green won an Edgar Award in the category "Best Mystery Teleplay from a Series" for this episode.
28	6	"The Final Adjustment"	Dennis Dugan	Story by : Christopher McQuarrie; Teleplay by : Charles H. Eglee & Channing Gibson & Ted Mann	November 22, 1994	0V05/5205	25.6
When a chiropractor's wife is murdered, Detectives Simone and Sipowicz learn that the doctor, Peter Shennon, had been engaged in an affair with his former secretary, Judith Krasky — and the arrow of suspicion points directly at him. Also, while moonlighting for a security company through ex-Det. Mike Roberts, Martinez becomes attracted to Leticia Beltran, the beautiful Hispanic college student he's been hired to protect; and a worried woman, Christine Williamson, brings a gun to Simone that she has found in the possession of her 11-year-old son.
29	7	"Double Abandando"	Andy Wolk	Story by : Walon Green; Teleplay by : Ted Mann & Gardner Stern & Burton Armus	November 29, 1994	0V06/5206	26.5
An 11-year-old boy claims he shot and killed an Hispanic boy in a turf-war incident at school, but Detective Simone senses the kid is protecting someone. Meanwhile, Eddie Reyna, a handsome and unprincipled ladies' man who is HIV positive, becomes a target of one of the women he's infected; and Donna's attractive sister, Dana, comes to visit — and causes trouble between Donna and Greg. Note: Debra Messing guest stars as Dana Abandando.
30	8	"You Bet Your Life"	Elodie Keene	Story by : Eric Newman & Tom Towles; Teleplay by : Eric Newman & Tom Towles and Leonard Gardner	December 6, 1994	0V08/5208	27.4
Simone and Sipowicz investigate the murder of a pregnant woman whose charred remains leave few clues as to her identity or that of her killer. Meanwhile, Sipowicz is deeply concerned when his friend, Dan Breen, is beaten up by Breen's mentally disturbed son, Danny.
31	9	"Don We Now Our Gay Apparel"	Michael M. Robin	Story by : Steven Bochco & David Milch; Teleplay by : Channing Gibson & Charles H. Eglee	January 3, 1995	0V09/5209	24.8
With Drag Performer Candace La Rue as a material witness, Simone and Sipowicz investigate the murder of a gay-bar proprietor. Also, Dan Breen visits his mentally disturbed son Danny despite Sipowicz' strenuous objections. In other developments, Medavoy investigates a gypsy fortune-telling scam after his elderly neighbor has been bilked out of her savings; and Lieutenant Fancy's wife is about to give birth.
32	10	"In The Butt, Bob"	Donna Deitch	Story by : Steven Bochco & David Milch; Teleplay by : Ted Mann & Burton Armus & Gardner Stern	January 10, 1995	0V10/5210	25.2
In a power play, Detective Arnold Solomon uses his clout to take a case away from Detective Bobby Simone after Simone has arrested a suspected serial killer named Putnam. Meanwhile, Borough Commander Haverill is out to get Lieutenant Fancy by tricking him into lying about the involvement of a top crime boss in a planned armored-car heist; Detective Lesniak deals with a flasher; reporter Benita Alden makes a play for Bobby; and Andy again proposes marriage to Sylvia Costas — this time successfully.
33	11	"Vishy-Vashy-Vinny"	Michael M. Robin	Story by : Steven Bochco & David Milch; Teleplay by : Ted Mann & Burton Armus & Gardner Stern	January 17, 1995	0V11/5211	24.6
Simone and Sipowicz get closer to identifying the "Webster Dictionary" serial killer, despite internal politics which complicate the investigation. Meanwhile, with stoolie Vinnie Greco as a go-between, Sipowicz and his men go under cover to try to thwart an armored-car bank heist. Lieutenant Fancy, with a recording from Greco, turns the tables against Borough Commander Haverill, forcing Haverill to put in for early retirement.
34	12	"Large Mouth Bass"	Charles Haid	Theresa Rebeck	February 7, 1995	0V12/5212	23.9
Simone and Sipowicz investigate the viciously brutal murder of a young woman; one of the suspects is Derrick Cobb, the girl's former stepfather. Meanwhile, Simone is concerned that his friend Raymond diSalvo is mixed up in drug dealing at the dance club where he works; and Detective Lesniak investigates handsome con artist Mac McClellan, who is peddling a bogus beauty machine to unsuspecting women. The one-five gets a new Borough Commander, Captain Clifford Bass, a veteran of patrol who has little experience with the Detective Division. Note: Shirley Knight won an Emmy Award for "Outstanding Guest Actress in a Drama Series" for her portrayal of the mother of a murder victim.
35	13	"Travels With Andy"	Mark Tinker	Rosemary Breslin	February 14, 1995	0V13/5213	23.3
Simone and Sipowicz investigate the execution-style murders of three employees at a fast-food restaurant, while Martinez and Lesniak seek the man who attempted to rape a 78-year-old woman, Mrs. Stevens. In personal situations, Andy and Sylvia disagree on the scope and grandeur of their planned wedding, and James becomes jealous when Adrienne goes to lunch with an old acquaintance, Dr. Paul Druzinski.
36	14	"A Murder With Teeth In It"	Donna Deitch	Franklyn Ajaye & Barry Douglass	February 21, 1995	0V14/5214	25.0
Simone and Sipowicz investigate the murder of a pimp, and all clues point to a suspect in their own department, Jerry McCabe, the detective who helped Andy get Andy Jr. out of a mistaken arrest. Two romantic crises develop: Medavoy's irrational jealousy causes Donna to think twice about their relationship; Simone suspects he's been betrayed in a breach of confidence by his girlfriend, reporter Benita Alden.
37	15	"Bombs Away"	Jorge Montesi	Story by : Steven Bochco & David Milch & Bill Clark; Teleplay by : Ted Mann & Gardner Stern	February 28, 1995	0V15/5215	22.8
Simone and Sipowicz investigate Vartan Illiescu, a disgruntled immigrant who may be a terrorist bomber; and someone bent on revenge assassinates serial killer George Putnam before he can come to trial. Meanwhile, Greg's relationship with Donna deteriorates after he makes the mistake of asking for advice from Donna's sister Dana.
38	16	"Un-American Graffiti"	Joe Ann Fogle	Leonard Gardner	March 14, 1995	0V16/5216	23.5
Simone and Sipowicz investigate the brutal murder of a teenage tagger who painted graffiti in Little Italy. Meanwhile, Donna decides what to do about her relationship with Greg; and Sylvia gets mugged, then reveals a dark secret to Andy.
39	17	"Dirty Socks"	Elodie Keene	Larry Cohen	March 21, 1995	0V17/5217	23.6
Detective Simone tries to persuade emotionally fragile Joyce Novak, a material witness in a double-murder case, to testify before the grand jury. Meanwhile, Sipowicz is horrified when he's assigned to investigate the murder of an elderly woman — the owner of a candy store where he worked as a child. Note: First appearance of Bill Brochtrup as PAA John Irvin
40	18	"Innuendo"	Mark Tinker	Story by : Walon Green & David Mills; Teleplay by : David Mills	April 4, 1995	0V18/5218	24.0
Simone and Sipowicz try to track down a killer who took to the streets on a shooting spree that began with the murder of a waitress and felled two cops and three civilians before it ended. Meanwhile, Lt. Fancy faces problems with his younger brother, a uniformed cop at another precinct named Reggie.
41	19	"Boxer Rebellion"	Jorge Montesi	Story by : Walon Green & Bill Clark; Teleplay by : Walon Green & Ted Mann & Gardner Stern	May 2, 1995	0V19/5219	20.2
Detective Simone finds himself attracted to the undercover cop, Diane Russell, who helps him pull off an elaborate sting to trap an arsonist; Sipowicz gets emotionally involved when a woman he persuaded to testify in a robbery case is murdered; and Martinez discovers that Lieutenant Fancy literally pulls no punches when the two of them spar in preparation for a departmental boxing tournament. Note: First Appearance of Kim Delaney as Diane Russell
42	20	"The Bookie and Kooky Cookie"	Mark Piznarski	George D. Putnam	May 9, 1995	0V20/5220	22.2
Trying to find the killer of a gambling bookie, Simone and Sipowicz get help from an unexpected source. Mentally unstable Joyce Novak, witness to a previous murder, charges Simone with sexual misconduct after he spurns her advances; and Sylvia Costas and a reluctant Andy begin religious counseling in preparation for their marriage.
43	21	"The Bank Dick"	Michael M. Robin	Victor Bumbalo	May 16, 1995	0V21/5221	20.8
A terminally ill infant proves the vital link between Simone and Sipowicz and a serial rapist; Simone suspects that Russell might be hiding a serious problem; Medavoy reluctantly considers reconciling with his estranged wife; Irvin solicit's Simone's help after he and his lover are assaulted — by police; and Sipowicz asks a personal favor of his partner.
44	22	"A.D.A. Sipowicz"	Mark Tinker	Story by : Steven Bochco & David Milch; Teleplay by : Ted Mann & Gardner Stern & Nicholas Wootton	May 23, 1995	0V22/5222	25.0
Intent on getting a confession, Sipowicz capitalizes on a case of mistaken identity; Fancy's brother is set up by his sergeant to face a harassment complaint until the one-five's detectives uncover the truth; Russell's hangover results in a close call during a street sweep operation; and the squad throws a bachelor party for Andy, whose prenuptial jitters permeate the precinct.
