= Janice Licalsi =

Fictional character in television series NYPD Blue

- NYPD Blue character
- Amy Brenneman as Janice Licalsi with David Caruso as John Kelly
- First appearance: "Pilot" (1x01)
- Last appearance: "From Whom the Skell Rolls" (2x02)
- Portrayed by: Amy Brenneman

In-universe information
- Gender: Female
- Title: Detective
- Occupation: NYPD Detective
- Family: Dominic Gennaro (father)
- Nationality: American

Janice Licalsi (formerly Gennaro) is a fictional character portrayed by Amy Brenneman on the television series NYPD Blue. She appeared in 18 episodes during the first two seasons of the show. The character was written out after technical advisor and producer Bill Clark became uneasy with the thought of having a murderous police officer as a main character.

== Character history ==
A uniformed police officer, Licalsi was assigned to the fictional 15th precinct. She took her mother's maiden name when she joined the force. Her father Dominic Gennaro, also a police officer, was on the payroll of mob boss Angelo Marino, who subsequently used this information to blackmail her into working for him.

Marino orders Licalsi to kill Detective John Kelly. In order to accomplish this, she entered into a relationship with Kelly, but ended up falling in love with him. Licalsi was unable to kill Kelly and instead killed both Marino and his driver.

Some time after Marino's death, Licalsi was contacted by mob boss Tommy Linardi, who has proof that she was working for Marino. She informs OCCB Inspector Lastarza, who unofficially assigns her to work undercover as an informant, a situation which strains her relationship with Kelly.

After Linardi and his associates are murdered, a notebook belonging to Marino is entered into evidence. The notebook contains Licalsi's name, and Kelly gives Licalsi the opportunity to destroy the pages incriminating her.

At the end of the first season, Licalsi is promoted to detective on the recommendation of Inspector Lastarza. She is temporarily assigned to the 15th squad pending a transfer to the intelligence division. She feels guilty over her actions involving the mob and, on Kelly's recommendation, speaks to a priest. Following this conversation, she surrenders herself to Lt. Arthur Fancy and confesses to murder. Upon her arrest, Kelly contracts for her a high-priced lawyer and pays her bail.

Kelly testifies at Licalsi's trial on her behalf, instigating an internal affairs investigation. The two resume their relationship during the course of the trial. Licalsi is convicted of manslaughter, and sentenced to two years in prison, though her lawyer says that she'll get work release after six months, and Kelly says he'll be visiting her upstate. This is the last time the character appears or is mentioned on NYPD Blue.
