= NYPD Blue season 1 =

Season of television series

NYPD Blue
- Season 1
- Season 1 U.S. DVD cover
- No. of episodes: 22

Release
- Original network: ABC
- Original release: September 21, 1993 – May 17, 1994

Season chronology
- Next → Season 2

The first season of NYPD Blue, an American television police drama set in New York City, aired as part of the 1993–94 United States network television schedule for ABC, premiering on September 21, 1993, and concluding on May 17, 1994. The show explores the internal and external struggles of the fictional 15th precinct of Manhattan. Each episode typically intertwines several plots involving an ensemble cast. The season led to a record 26 Emmy nominations and six awards.

== Plot ==
John Kelly and Andy Sipowicz are detectives in the NYPD's 15th precinct. Sipowicz is a gifted detective but also an alcoholic, a racist, and a homophobe. Kelly has a genuine affection for his partner but becomes increasingly exasperated by Sipowicz's behavior. In the pilot, Sipowicz is ambushed and shot multiple times by Alphonse Giardella, a mobster whom Sipowicz, while drunk, insulted badly in public. This leads to his decision to stay sober (after involuntarily drying out while in a coma) and save his job. While his partner is recuperating, Kelly is teamed up by the squad's Lieutenant, Arthur Fancy, with a young cop from Anti-Crime, James Martinez.

Kelly's personal life is no less complicated, as he is reluctantly going through a divorce from his wife, Laura, and is embarking on an affair with a uniformed cop, Janice Licalsi. He is unaware that Licalsi is connected to Giardella's former boss, Angelo Marino, who asks her to do a hit on Kelly. After he makes an additional threat against her father, Licalsi impulsively guns him down, the repercussions of which come back to haunt both her and Kelly.

Sipowicz begins a relationship with A.D.A. Sylvia Costas while another detective in the squad, Greg Medavoy, embarks on an affair of his own with the squad's new police administrative aide (P.A.A.), Donna Abandando.

== Cast ==
=== Main ===
Actor	Character	Title	Main cast	Recurring cast
David Caruso	John Kelly	Senior Detective	entire season	—N/a
Dennis Franz	Andy Sipowicz	Junior Detective	entire season	—N/a
James McDaniel	Arthur Fancy	Commanding Officer	entire season	—N/a
Sherry Stringfield	ADA Laura Michaels	Assistant District Attorney	entire season	—N/a
Amy Brenneman	Janice Licalsi	Patrol Officer	entire season	—N/a
Nicholas Turturro	James Martinez	Patrol Officer	entire season	—N/a
Sharon Lawrence	ADA Sylvia Costas	Assistant District Attorney	—N/a	episodes 1, 4, 6–9, 11, 13–16, 18–22
Gordon Clapp	Greg Medavoy	Senior Detective	—N/a	episodes 3, 5–6, 8–19, 21–22
Gail O'Grady	PAA Donna Abandando	Police Administrative Aide	—N/a	episodes 8–22

=== Recurring guest roles ===
Season 1's recurring guest roles include:

- David Schwimmer as Josh '4B' Goldstein (Episodes 1–4), Laura Michaels' neighbor, whose stint as a vigilante ends badly. Dies in episode 4.
- Robert Costanzo as Alphonse Giardella (Episodes 1–3, 5–7), a caporegime in Marino's family who, after shooting and nearly killing Sipowicz in the pilot, turns state's evidence. Assassinated in episode 7.
- Joe Santos as Angelo Marino (Episodes 1–2), head mobster who wants Kelly dead for continued "business" interference. Murdered in episode 2.
- Larry Romano as Richie Catina (Episodes 2, 9–12), a mob enforcer working for Marino's rivals.
- Daniel Benzali as James Sinclair, Esq. (Episodes 1, 2, 22), Giardella's crooked lawyer.
- Luis Guzman as Hector Martinez (Episodes 5, 9), Detective Martinez' father.
- Michael Harney as Detective Mike Roberts (Episodes 6, 8–9, 15, 18), a veteran investigator in the 15th.
- Michael DeLuise as Andy Sipowicz, Jr. (Episode 7, 19, 22), Andy's estranged eldest son.
- Bradley Whitford as Norman Gardner (Episodes 13, 21), a crusading reporter.

== Episodes ==
Each NYPD Blue episode entry includes its original airdate in the United States, the writing and directing credits, and a plot summary. The credits and airdates are taken from the pamphlet accompanying the Region 1 Season 1 DVDs.

No. overall	No. in season	Title	Directed by	Written by	Original release date	Prod. code	U.S. viewers (millions)
1	1	"Pilot"	Gregory Hoblit	Story by : David Milch & Steven Bochco; Teleplay by : David Milch	September 21, 1993	0K01/5101	22.8
In the very first episode of the series, the hotheaded and alcoholic Detective Andy Sipowicz is foiled in his latest attempt to get mobster Alphonse Giardella in prison, leading to Sipowicz attacking Giardella outside his restaurant. Suspended for his reckless actions, Sipowicz is lured into an ambush by Giardella, who shoots him several times. Detective John Kelly, Sipowicz's younger partner who is going through a divorce, decides to take on the mob himself while starting a relationship with Officer Janice Licalsi. Notes: First appearance of David Caruso as John Kelly, Dennis Franz as Andy Sipowicz, James McDaniel as Arthur Fancy, Sherry Stringfield as Laura Michaels, Amy Brenneman as Janice Licalsi, Nicholas Turturro as James Martinez, and Sharon Lawrence as Sylvia Costas.; Guest starring Daniel Benzali as James Sinclair, Joe Santos (The Rockford Files) as Angelo Marino, and David Schwimmer as Josh '4B' Goldstein.; A quarter of ABC's 225 member stations preempted the pilot.; The pilot earned a DGA Award; the competition included two other episodes from the season, "True Confessions" and "From Hare to Eternity".; A recurring guest-star during Season 1 was actor Robert Costanzo as the mafioso Alphonse Giardella. Costanzo was also a guest on Friends, playing the character Joey Tribbiani Sr. in the first season episode "The One with the Boobies". Costanzo and Schwimmer are two Friends actors who appeared in multiple NYPD Blue episodes in the first season.; The famous opening scene between Sipowicz and ADA Costas includes her saying the line "I would say 'Res ipsa loquitur' if I thought you knew what it meant," to which Sipowicz replied, "Hey, ipsa this you pissy little bitch", while grabbing his crotch. The phrase Costas is referring to is Latin, meaning 'the thing speaks for itself'.; In 1996, TV Guide included this episode as part of its "100 Most Memorable Moments in TV History", ranking it # 83.
2	2	"4B or Not 4B"	Gregory Hoblit	Story by : David Milch & Steven Bochco; Teleplay by : David Milch	September 28, 1993	0K02/5102	20.3
As Sipowicz slowly recovers from his wounds, he says that he cannot remember who shot him. Kelly intervenes to save a judge being held at gunpoint by a man angered by the former giving his son's killer a favorable plea bargain. Licalsi is forced to take matters into her own hands when the mob pressures her to deal with Kelly. Laura Kelly's neighbour, Josh '4B' Goldstein, is mugged and obtains a gun, ignoring Kelly's advice not to be consumed by vengeance. Note: This episode earned screenwriters David Milch, Michael S. Chernuchin, and René Balcer the Edgar Award for Best Mystery Teleplay from a Series.
3	3	"Brown Appetit"	Gregory Hoblit	Story by : David Milch & Steven Bochco; Teleplay by : David Milch	October 5, 1993	0K03/5103	21.0
Despite some lingering concerns, Fancy restores Sipowicz to full duty; he and Kelly resume their partnership by tackling a brutal robbery-homicide. Fallout from the Marino case implicates Licalsi's cop father in wrongdoing and threatens her new relationship with Kelly. Millionaire financier Thomas Wagner arranges for Kelly to moonlight as a bodyguard for his wife Susan, exposing a terrible secret between them. Disgusted with the DOJ cutting Giardella a deal for witness protection, Sipowicz decides to carry out one final act of revenge. Note: First appearance of Gordon Clapp as Greg Medavoy: Wendie Malick guest stars as Susan Wagner.
4	4	"True Confessions"	Charles Haid	Story by : Art Monterastelli and David Milch & Steven Bochco; Teleplay by : David Milch and Art Monterastelli	October 12, 1993	K506/5105	21.2
Kelly and Sipowicz assist a fellow detective on a double homicide committed during a liquor store holdup, but Sipowicz suspects that the wrong man has been fingered for the crime. Licalsi turns to Kelly for support when her father has committed suicide to avoid the shame of a trial. Mrs. Wagner turns herself in after a life-changing decision. Goldstein's obsession with vigilantism takes a deadly turn. Notes: Guest starring Wendie Malick as Susan Wagner, Ethan Phillips as Dwight, and David Schwimmer as Josh '4B' Goldstein.; There is a commentary for this episode by David Milch on the DVD release.; In 1997 TV Guide ranked this episode number 36 on its '100 Greatest Episodes of All Time' list.
5	5	"Emission Accomplished"	Michael M. Robin	Ted Mann	October 19, 1993	0K11/5111	19.6
Martinez discovers that his drug-addicted brother Roberto has been harassed by a dirty cop; learning that the same cop is behind a scheme to drive poor residents out of their apartments, he decides to become an IAB informant. Kelly, knowing that "turning rat" could destroy Martinez's career, makes a hard choice. In her first week as an ADA, Laura forms an unexpected connection with Giardella while collecting his testimony. A veteran detective in the 15th, facing bankruptcy after getting scammed, spends the last of his money on elaborate pranks. Notes: Guest starring Luis Guzmán as Hector Martinez and Mitchell Ryan as Officer Jack Hanlon.
6	6	"Personal Foul"	Brad Silberling	Story by : David Milch; Teleplay by : Burton Armus	October 26, 1993	0K08/5108	22.2
Kelly is forced to arrest a close friend for fatally injuring a fellow basketball player; when the man then attacks a corrections officer, the two must come to terms with their strained relationship. Sipowicz uses psychological tactics to get answers in the drive-by shooting of a woman on the freeway. When Licalsi's quick thinking saves his life, Kelly contemplates giving her a second chance. Notes: Guest starring Tobin Bell as Jerry and Dean Norris as Father Curly; There is a commentary for this episode by Brad Silberling on the DVD release.; James Pickens Jr., who played defendant Nathan Foster, later appeared in Season 7 as Lieutenant Joe Abner.
7	7	"NYPD Lou"	Gregory Hoblit	Ted Mann	November 2, 1993	0K07/5107	19.7
While working on an emotionally charged case involving a missing boy and an alleged rapist, Sipowicz tries to reconnect with his own estranged son, Andy Jr., who is considering marriage. Laura is the sole witness when Giardella is murdered in a mob hit. Kelly helps a mentally ill homeless man find the courage to cooperate in a murder investigation. Licalsi and Kelly decide to make things official. Notes: This is the first appearance of Michael DeLuise as Andy Jr., Sipowicz's son.; Guest starring Dan Hedaya as Lou the Werewolf.
8	8	"Tempest in a C-Cup"	Daniel Sackheim	Gardner Stern	November 16, 1993	0K10/5110	19.8
Unable to directly prove that a man responsible for several cab robberies is also responsible for an act of murder, Kelly (with Martinez's help) goes all the way to obtain a confession. Sipowicz helps Costas prosecute a mobbed-up club owner; at dinner that night, they decide to start dating. Laura resists pressure from her boss to make false statements in court. Fancy hires Donna Abandando as the 15th's new administrative assistant. Notes: First appearance of Gail O'Grady as Donna Abandando.; Guest starring Ginger Lynn Allen as Monique; This episode earned director Daniel Sackheim a Primetime Emmy Award for Outstanding Directing for a Drama Series and editor Stanford C. Allen a Creative Arts Emmy Award for "Outstanding Individual Achievement in Editing for a Series - Single Camera Production".
9	9	"Ice Follies"	Dennis Dugan	W.K. Scott Meyer	November 30, 1993	0K09/5109	18.5
Roberto Martinez dies of a heroin overdose; when Martinez realizes that his father plans to avenge Roberto and risk ruining his own life, Sipowicz and Kelly get involved. Licalsi is coerced into providing a favor to the mob and decides to face the consequences rather than get Kelly involved. Medavoy, in the throes of a midlife crisis, accepts Donna's offer to go ice skating. Note: Guest starring Luis Guzmán as Hector Martinez
10	10	"Oscar, Meyer, Weiner"	Brad Silberling	Ted Mann & Gardner Stern	December 7, 1993	0K12/5112	17.5
An investigation into the brutal murders of a wealthy family forces Sipowicz to confront his personal bigotry when several black men are linked to the crime. Licalsi makes a deal with Lastarza to inform on her mob contacts, setting off Kelly's overprotective nature. A gay screenwriter suffering from writer's block and gerascophobia reaches out to Sipowicz for help recovering his stolen Oscar. Note: Guest starring Renee O'Connor as Rebecca Sloane; There is a commentary for this episode by Brad Silberling on the DVD release.
11	11	"From Hare to Eternity"	Eric Laneuville	David Milch & Burton Armus	December 14, 1993	0K13/5113	19.0
On Christmas Eve, Sipowicz and Kelly race against time to save the life of a kidnapped girl. Medavoy and Martinez build a case against a fugitive set to be extradited to North Carolina, but the only witness proves to be a challenge. Fancy is pressured by Captain Haverill to transfer out of the 15th or end his career in disgrace; an unexpected ally comes to his aid. At the precinct Christmas party, Costas is turned down by Sipowicz. Kelly takes Laura's advice to trust Licalsi and stop judging her decisions. Licalsi makes contact with a dangerous man. Note: Guest starring Anthony Powers as Tommy Linardi
12	12	"Up on the Roof"	Michael M. Robin	George D. Putnam	January 4, 1994	0K14/5114	20.7
When one of Licalsi's mob associates is murdered, Kelly takes illegal measures to keep her past a secret, driving a new wedge between them. The newly minted Detective Martinez tackles his first case involving a college student, a rash of credit cards thefts, and a fake ATM. Fancy deals with the complications of fatherhood when a teenager he had taken into his home faces the possibility of having to return to the custody of his biological mother, a recovering drug addict with a criminal record.
13	13	"Abandando Abandoned"	Gregory Hoblit	Story by : David Milch & Steven Bochco; Teleplay by : Ted Mann & Gardner Stern	January 11, 1994	0K15/5115	20.5
Detectives investigate the shooting death of a man whose wife recently transferred to the precinct. A woman claims she wants her husband prosecuted for spousal abuse but never follows through on her threat. Elsewhere, Medavoy begins an affair with Donna. Notes: Guest starring Bradley Whitford as Norman Gardner
14	14	"Jumpin' Jack Fleishman"	Rick Wallace	Story by : Steven Bochco & David Milch; Teleplay by : Ted Mann & Gardner Stern & Burton Armus	January 18, 1994	0K16/5116	21.7
The detectives search for a cross-dressing killer, while a sexual assault victim fears her husband will blame the attack on her provocative style of dress. Sipowicz's dental appointment is interrupted when a doctor threatens to commit suicide.
15	15	"Steroid Roy"	Félix Alcalá	Ann Biderman	February 8, 1994	0K17/5117	23.5
A detective becomes the prime suspect in the suspicious suicide of a police informant. Laura believes Kelly may have overlooked evidence in a homicide investigation and a detective obsessed with his physique is tested for substance abuse. Note: This episode won the 1994 Primetime Emmy Award for Outstanding Writing for a Drama Series.; There is a commentary for this episode by Sharon Lawrence on the DVD release; she notes that her role as a district attorney was originally written for a man; after she was cast and exhibited a behind-the-scenes rapport with Franz, her character was expanded to meet Franz's request for Sipowicz to have a romantic interest.
16	16	"A Sudden Fish"	Lesli Linka Glatter	Story by : Steven Bochco & David Milch; Teleplay by : Burton Armus & Gardner Stern	February 15, 1994	0K18/5118	17.8
The girlfriend of a terminally ill millionaire is blackmailed by her ex-lover and Sipowicz investigates the robbery of a disabled Vietnam veteran.
17	17	"Black Men Can Jump"	Jesús S. Treviño	Story by : Steven Bochco & David Milch; Teleplay by : Ted Mann	March 1, 1994	0K19/5119	22.2
The detectives investigate the slaying of a young black teenager whose father takes matters in his own hands when a likely suspect escapes. Sipowicz suspects a private investigator is taking advantage of a man whose daughter disappeared 2 1/2 years earlier. Notes: There is a commentary for this episode by Bill Clark on the DVD release. Clark notes that the only roles that were initially cast were Franz as Sipowicz and McDaniel as Fancy. After Clark saw Mad Dog and Glory he suggested to the show's creators that David Caruso play Sipowicz's partner; Clark then found out that Caruso was already under consideration.
18	18	"Zeppo Marks Brothers"	Michael M. Robin	Story by : Steven Bochco & David Milch; Teleplay by : Ann Biderman	March 22, 1994	0K20/5120	19.9
After a material witness escapes, again, from protective custody, and is gunned down in the street, the detectives scramble to save their case against the two brothers he was to testify against -- who have also planned a hit on Laura. Notes: Guest starring Leland Orser as Zeppo; The episode marked the final appearance of Sherry Stringfield as Laura Michaels. Regardless, she remains credited for the rest of the season.; Title plays with the Name of Zeppo Marx, one of the Marx Brothers
19	19	"Serge the Concierge"	Lesli Linka Glatter	Story by : Bill Clark; Teleplay by : David Milch & Gardner Stern & Burton Armus	March 29, 1994	0K21/5121	21.2
Kelly, Medavoy, and Martinez lead a search for a girl's body in a Staten Island landfill, finding another body in the process. Sipowicz attempts to clear Andy Jr.'s name after his son is arrested for selling drugs. Note: The episode earned production designer Paul Eads and set decorator Mary Ann Biddle a Creative Arts Emmy Award for "Outstanding Individual Achievement in Art Direction for a Series".
20	20	"Good Time Charlie"	Gregory Hoblit	Story by : Steven Bochco & David Milch; Teleplay by : Ted Mann & Ann Biderman	May 3, 1994	0K22/5122	19.0
Kelly and Sipowicz investigate the death of one of Charlie Lear's many mistresses. Licalsi receives an unexpected promotion. Sipowicz has a rough night after meeting Costas' family at a birthday party. Fancy's wife tells her husband that she is pregnant.
21	21	"Guns 'N' Rosaries"	Michael M. Robin	Story by : Steven Bochco & David Milch; Teleplay by : Burton Armus & Gardner Stern	May 10, 1994	0K23/5123	22.8
Medavoy and Martinez narrowly escape injury when a disgruntled driver tries to shoot them, then face the wrath of angry African Americans who believe that they have killed a black man without reason. Licalsi confesses to murdering Marino and his driver and Andy attends an Alcoholics Anonymous meeting. Meanwhile, Medavoy moves out once again after he discovers his wife has been cheating on him.
22	22	"Rockin' Robin"	Gregory Hoblit	Story by : Jody Worth; Teleplay by : Jody Worth & Ted Mann	May 17, 1994	0K24/5124	23.2
Detectives investigate the murder of a priest whose body was discovered in a park frequented by male prostitutes. Sipowicz reopens an investigation into the disappearance of the daughter of a used car businessman. While Kelly and Robin become lovers, Licalsi wins release on bail. Notes: Guest starring Daniel Benzali as James Sinclair and Bradley Whitford as Norman Gardner.
