= Amy Brenneman =

American actress (born 1964)

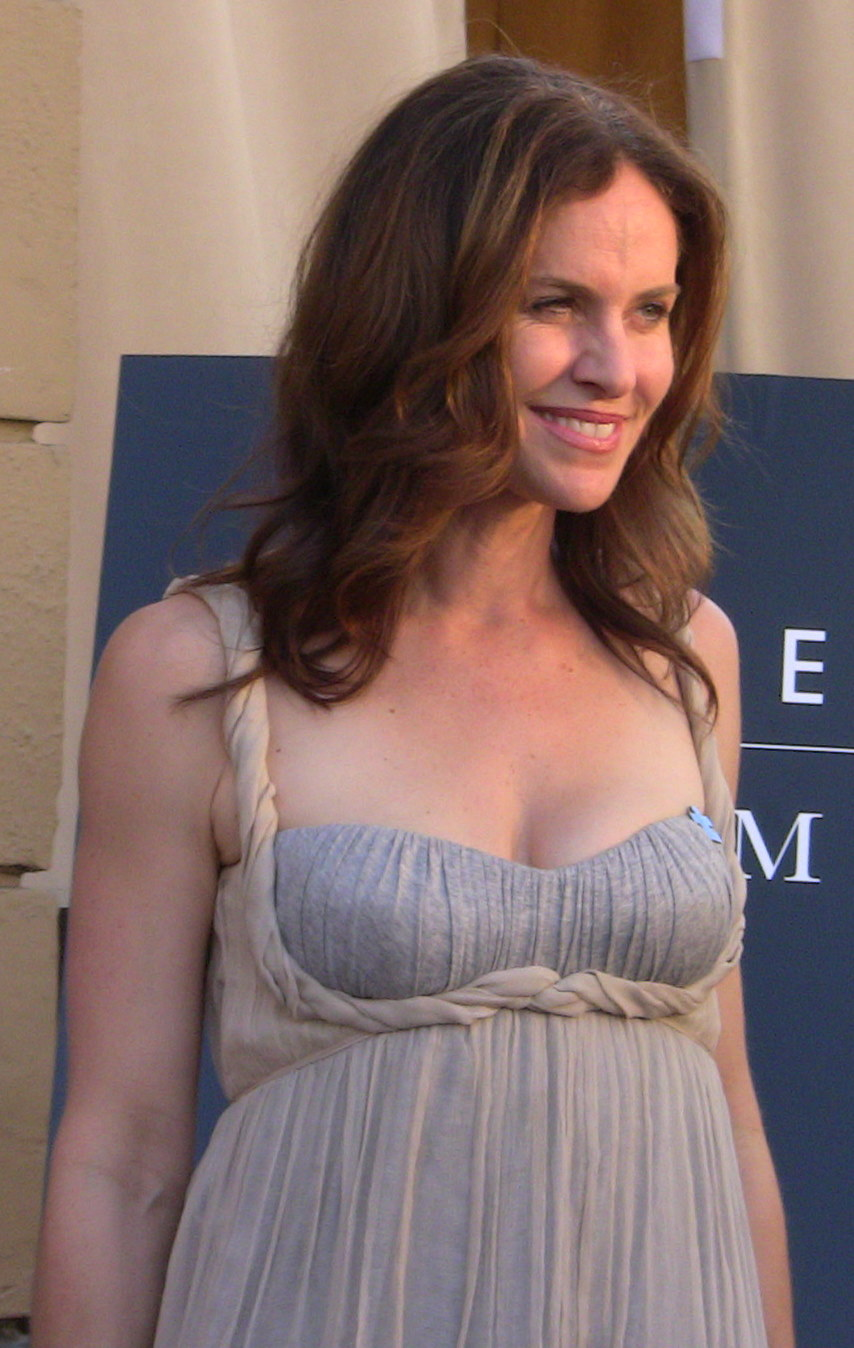
- Brenneman in 2009
- Born: Amy Frederica Brenneman; June 22, 1964 (age 62); New London, Connecticut, U.S.
- Education: Harvard University (BA, MRPL)
- Occupations: Actress; producer
- Years active: 1992–present
- Spouse: Brad Silberling (m. 1995)
- Children: 2
- Website: theamybrenneman.com

Amy Frederica Brenneman (born June 22, 1964) is an American actress and producer. She first gained prominence as Detective Janice Licalsi in the ABC police drama series NYPD Blue (1993–1994). Brenneman later co-created and starred as Judge Amy Gray in the CBS drama series Judging Amy (1999–2005), earning multiple Primetime Emmy Award nominations for these roles.

She has also starred as Violet Turner in the medical drama Private Practice (2007–2013), and as Laurie Garvey in the HBO drama The Leftovers (2014–2017). She is also known for her recurring role as Faye Moskowitz on Frasier and has starred in various films, including Heat (1995), Fear (1996), Daylight (1996), Things You Can Tell Just by Looking at Her (2000), Nine Lives (2005), and The Jane Austen Book Club (2007).

== Early life and education ==
Brenneman was born on June 22, 1964, in New London, Connecticut, to Frederica Joanne (née Shoenfield), a judge of the Connecticut State Superior Court, and Russell Langdon Brenneman Jr., an environmental lawyer. Her aunt was Cold War-era journalist Beryl D. Hines. Her mother was Jewish, and joined a Congregationalist church as an adult. Her father, who was of English, Irish, and Swiss descent, was from a Protestant background.

Brenneman was raised in Glastonbury, Connecticut, where she participated in theatre as a teenager, both in school at Glastonbury High School and with a local theater group. She graduated from Harvard University, where she majored in comparative religion, in 1987. While at Harvard, she co-founded Cornerstone Theatre Company, with which she traveled for several years after graduation. She later returned to Harvard and graduated in 2026 with a Masters of Religion and Public Life from the Harvard Divinity School.

== Career ==
Brenneman began her career in the short-lived CBS series Middle Ages in 1992. The next year she was cast in her first major role as mob-connected uniformed officer Janice Licalsi on the ABC police drama series, NYPD Blue. Her story arc, which included a romantic relationship with David Caruso's character, ran through the show's first season (1993–1994) and the first few episodes of the second season. She was nominated for an Emmy Award for Best Supporting Actress in a Drama Series in 1994 and for Outstanding Guest Actress the following year.

After leaving NYPD Blue, Brenneman made her way into film. In 1995, she appeared in Bye Bye Love, Casper, and the critically acclaimed crime drama Heat. In 1996, Brenneman had the female lead role opposite Sylvester Stallone in disaster thriller Daylight, and also starred in another thriller, Fear. In 1997, she played the leading role in the independent drama film Nevada. The next year she starred in Your Friends & Neighbors directed by Neil LaBute. In 1998–1999 season, she returned to television with a recurring role on the NBC comedy Frasier as Faye Moskowitz.

In 1999, Brenneman became creator and executive producer of her own television series Judging Amy, in which she played the title character. Brenneman portrayed a divorced single mother working as a Family Court Judge in Hartford, Connecticut. The show's concept was based on the real-life experiences of her mother, Frederica Brenneman, as a superior court judge in the state of Connecticut. Frederica Brenneman was one of Harvard Law School's first female graduates and became a juvenile court judge in Connecticut when Amy was three years old. Amy has said, "I play my mother's job, not my mother." Judging Amy ran on CBS for six seasons and 138 episodes from September 19, 1999, to May 3, 2005, to good ratings. In 2002, she was awarded the Women in Film Lucy Award in recognition of her excellence and innovation in her creative works that have enhanced the perception of women through the medium of television.

Brenneman starred in ensemble cast film Things You Can Tell Just by Looking at Her directed by Rodrigo García in 2000. In 2005, she starred in another Rodrigo García's independent drama, Nine Lives. In 2007, Brenneman played the role of Sylvia Avila in The Jane Austen Book Club based on 2004 novel of the same name by Karen Joy Fowler. In 2008, Brenneman co-starred in 88 Minutes alongside Al Pacino.

In March 2007, Brenneman was cast as Violet Turner in the Grey's Anatomy spin-off, Private Practice. The Shonda Rhimes series ran on ABC from September 26, 2007, to January 22, 2013. She later starred in films The Face of Love and Words and Pictures, and was cast in HBO drama series The Leftovers opposite Justin Theroux. Also in 2013, Brenneman played the role of Mary of Guise, the series' lead character's mother, in Reign.

In 2022, Brenneman returned to premium television starring opposite Jeff Bridges and John Lithgow as Zoe McDonald in the FX action-thriller series The Old Man, a role she reprised through the conclusion of its second season.

== Personal life ==
In 1995, Brenneman married director Brad Silberling in the garden at her parents' home. They had originally met on the set of NYPD Blue. Brenneman and Silberling have two children, Charlotte Tucker and Bodhi Russell, in Pasadena.

Brenneman is an Episcopalian.

Brenneman signed the "We Had Abortions" petition in the October 2006 issue of Ms. Magazine, joining over 5,000 women declaring that they had an abortion and were "unashamed of the choice they made."

In the February 28, 2007, all-star benefit reading of The Gift of Peace at UCLA's Freud Playhouse, she portrays an entrepreneur, alongside actors Ed Asner, Barbara Bain, George Coe, Wendie Malick, and James Pickens, Jr. The play was an open appeal and fundraiser for passage of U.S. House Resolution 808, which sought to establish a Cabinet-level "Department of Peace" in the United States government, funded by a two percent diversion of The Pentagon's annual budget.

In July 2008, Brenneman was nominated as a candidate on the Unite for Strength slate for a place on the national governing board of the Screen Actors Guild (SAG) in elections scheduled for September 18, 2008. The bid was successful.

Brenneman is also a supporter of more restrictive gun laws. In 2009, she hosted the Target for a Safe America gala at the Riviera Country Club in Los Angeles for the Brady Center to Prevent Gun Violence.

== Filmography ==
Key
†	Denotes works that have not yet been released

=== Film ===
Year	Title	Role	Notes
1995	Bye Bye Love	Susan	
1995	Casper	Amelia	
1995	Heat	Eady	
1996	Fear	Laura Walker	
1996	Daylight	Madelyne "Maddy" Thompson	
1997	Nevada	Chrysty	
1997	Lesser Prophets	Annie	
1998	City of Angels	Angel	Uncredited cameo
1998	Your Friends & Neighbors	Mary	
1999	The Suburbans	Grace	
2000	Things You Can Tell Just by Looking at Her	Det. Kathy Faber	Segment: "Love Waits for Kathy"
2003	Off the Map	Adult Bo Groden	
2005	Nine Lives	Lorna	
2007	88 Minutes	Shelly Barnes	
2007	The Jane Austen Book Club	Sylvia	
2008	Downloading Nancy	Carol	
2009	Mother and Child	Dr. Eleanor Stone	
2013	Words and Pictures	Elspeth	
2013	The Face of Love	Ann	
2016	In the Shadows of the Rainbow		Short film
2019	Peel	Lucille	
2019	Her Mind in Pieces	Mother	Segment: "Here Now"
2019	Foster Boy	Kim Trainer	
2021	Sweet Girl	Diana Morgan	

=== Television ===
Year	Title	Role	Notes
1992	Middle Ages	Blanche	Episodes: "The Pig in the Python", "Night Moves", "Murmur of the Heart"
1992	Murder, She Wrote	Amy Wainwright	Episode: "A Christmas Secret"
1993–1994	NYPD Blue	Det. Janice Licalsi	Main role, 18 episodes
1997	Duckman	Lauren Simone (voice)	Episode: "A Trophied Duck"
1998–1999	Frasier	Faye Moskowitz	Recurring role, 4 episodes
1999	A.T.F.	Agent Robin O'Brien	TV film
1999	Mary Cassatt: An American Impressionist	Mary Cassatt	TV film
1999–2005	Judging Amy	Amy Gray	Lead role, 138 episodes
2004	Sesame Street	Herself	
2007	Grey's Anatomy	Dr. Violet Turner	Episode: "The Other Side of This Life: Parts 1 & 2"
2007–2013	Private Practice	Dr. Violet Turner	Main role, 106 episodes
2011	Robot Chicken	Dorothy Gale / Various (voice)	Episode: "The Departy Monster"
2014–2015	Reign	Marie de Guise	Episodes: "The Consummation", "Forbidden", "The Price"
2014–2017	The Leftovers	Laurie Garvey	Main role, 20 episodes
2016	No Tomorrow	Herself	Episode: "No Holds Barred"
2017	Veep	Regina Pell	Episode: "Library"
2017	The Get	Ellen	Television film
2018	Jane the Virgin	Donna	Episode: "Chapter Eighty"
2019	Goliath	Diana Blackwood	8 episodes
2021	Tell Me Your Secrets	Mary Barlow	Main cast
2022	Shining Girls	Rachel	Main cast
2022–2024	The Old Man	Zoe	Main cast

=== Music videos ===
Year	Artist	Title	Role	Ref.
2014	Various	"Imagine" (UNICEF: World version)	Herself	

=== Producer ===
Year	Title	Notes
1997	Nevada	Co-producer
1999–2005	Judging Amy	Executive producer, writer/creator (138 episodes)
2016	Heartbeat	Executive producer (10 episodes)
2018	Intelligent Lives	Executive producer

== Awards and nominations ==
Year	Award	Category	Work	Result
1994	Viewers for Quality Television Award	Best Supporting Actress in a Quality Drama Series	NYPD Blue	Nominated
1994	Primetime Emmy Award	Outstanding Supporting Actress in a Drama Series	NYPD Blue	Nominated
1995	Primetime Emmy Award	Outstanding Guest Actress in a Drama Series	NYPD Blue	Nominated
2000	Golden Globe Award	Best Actress in a Television Series – Drama	Judging Amy	Nominated
2000	TV Guide Award	Favorite Actress in a New Series	Judging Amy	Won
2000	Producers Guild of America Award	Outstanding Producer of Episodic Television	Judging Amy	Nominated
2000	Primetime Emmy Award	Outstanding Lead Actress in a Drama Series	Judging Amy	Nominated
2000	Viewers for Quality Television Award	Best Actress in a Quality Drama Series	Judging Amy	Nominated
2001	Golden Globe Award	Best Actress in a Television Series – Drama	Judging Amy	Nominated
2001	TV Guide Award	Actress of the Year in a Drama Series	Judging Amy	Won
2001	Primetime Emmy Award	Outstanding Lead Actress in a Drama Series	Judging Amy	Nominated
2002	Golden Globe Award	Best Actress in a Television Series – Drama	Judging Amy	Nominated
2002	Primetime Emmy Award	Outstanding Lead Actress in a Drama Series	Judging Amy	Nominated
2002	Satellite Award	Best Performance by an Actress in a Series – Drama	Judging Amy	Nominated
2002	Women in Film Lucy Award	Lucy Award		Won
2003	Screen Actors Guild Award	Outstanding Performance by a Female Actor in a Drama Series	Judging Amy	Nominated
2005	Locarno International Film Festival	Best Actress	Nine Lives	Won
2005	Gotham Award	Best Ensemble Cast	Nine Lives	Nominated
2007	TV Land Award	TV Moment That Became Headline News; For appearing nude in the pilot episode	NYPD Blue	Nominated
