= The Bitch (novel) =

1979 novel by Jackie Collins

- Author: Jackie Collins
- Language: English
- Genre: Fiction
- Published: 1979
- Publisher: W. H. Allen & Co.
- Publication place: England

The Bitch is the seventh novel by the British author Jackie Collins, first published in 1979.

The book is a sequel to her 1969 novel The Stud, and both novels were adapted into films in the late 1970s starring Collins' sister Joan Collins.

== Plot ==
Wealthy 39-year-old Nico Constantine comes to Las Vegas. The son of a poor Greek fisherman, Nico moved to Athens when he was in his teens and met wealthy opera singer Lise Maria Androtti, sixteen years his senior, who taught him all about the world. They travelled together, he learned foreign languages, developed a taste for expensive clothes and cars, and learned about the stock market and gambling. Within three years they were married, and spent over twenty blissful years together until she died. Heartbroken but now wealthy after inheriting his wife's fortune, Nico moved around the world, eventually settling in Beverly Hills and living the life of a bachelor without getting seriously involved with any of the much younger women whom he dates. Eventually his money begins to run out. He goes to Las Vegas to make money gambling, but ends up owing the mafia-run casino a fortune which he cannot pay. His friend Bernie Darrell flies in from Los Angeles to help, but also brings along an unwelcome guest in Cherry, Nico's former girlfriend who wants to resume their relationship. Unable to pay off the casino, Nico steals a diamond ring from a wealthy woman he spends the night with and makes a fast exit from Vegas to sell the ring in order to pay back the money, leaving Bernie there to persuade the casino that he's still in town.

In New York, wealthy divorcee Fontaine Khaled is having personal problems of her own. The English former wife of an Arab billionaire, she spends her ample divorce settlement on a life of hedonistic indulgence, shopping and socialising as she divides her time between New York and London. But Fontaine's money is running out. Fontaine's latest fling is young actor Jump Jennings, but Fontaine is quickly growing bored with him. After her luxury apartment is burgled by her vengeful maid and most of her belongings stolen, Fontaine heads back to London.

On the plane to London, Fontaine meets Nico, who is on his way to London to sell the ring he stole. The two hit it off, but both remain secretive about the financial problems they are facing. In order to avoid problems at the airport, Nico covertly plants the ring in a compartment in Fontaine's purse so that she can carry it through customs for him and he can get it back later without her ever knowing. After landing, however, Fontaine doesn't wait for him and heads to her home unaware she is carrying the ring.

Back in Vegas, Bernie continues to reassure the casino boss Joseph Fonicetti that Nico is still around while Cherry begins seeing his son Dino. However, Bernie's ex-wife Susanna, the goddaughter of Joseph Fonicetti, turns up and wants them to reconcile and remarry, hampering Bernie's plans.

In London, Fontaine realises she will be financially ruined if she doesn't turn around the fortunes of her now-failing nightclub, Hobo, and will lose everything including her house in Chelsea (which she got in her divorce settlement), her chauffeur driven Rolls Royce, and her nightclub. After being apprised of the latest news from her assistant Polly, and her wealthy best friends Vanessa and Leonard Grant, Fontaine begins a plan to restore her nightclub to its former glory by hiring a new manager to run it. Meanwhile, Nico meets up with Bernie's friend Hal, in order to offload the stolen ring - but first has to find Fontaine and get it back. Luckily, Hal knows Fontaine and tells Nico where to find her. That night, Nico arranges to run into Fontaine while out on the town. They spend the night together at her house, and the following morning Nico manages to get back the ring from Fontaine's purse. However, Fontaine catches him in the act and after learning what he did, she throws him out. He later sends her roses and a diamond bracelet with an apology.

Nico gives the ring to Hal to have it appraised, but they discover it's a fake made of glass. Nico tries to think of an alternative plan and starts gambling at the casinos again. He wins some money and meets a beautiful woman called Lynn. They spend the night together but the following morning she tells him that she was sent by the mafia to give him a warning about paying his debt. Later, Nico is brought to London underworld boss Thrush Feather, who tells him that in order to get more time to clear his debt to the Fonacettis, he can carry out a job for the local mob. Nico is to get himself invited to the country estate of Fontaine's best friends, the Grants, who are entering their racehorse 'Garbo' in a high stakes derby that weekend. Their horse is the favourite to win, but Nico's job is to ensure that it loses. Nico begrudgingly accepts the assignment.

In Vegas, Bernie can no longer keep up the facade that Nico is still in town. Meanwhile, Dino and Cherry fall in love and decide to get married, but his domineering father doesn't approve and because Dino didn't stand up to him, Cherry goes back to Los Angeles heartbroken. Dino later follows her, determined to marry her regardless of his father's wishes, but discovers Cherry has killed herself in her apartment. Dino finds comfort in Susanna, with whom he has been friends since childhood, and the two of them decide to marry - much to Bernie's relief.

After Fontaine forgives him for using her, she invites Nico to accompany her to the Grants' country estate. Once there, Nico blackmails Sandy, the horse's jockey, with some incriminating photos of him and Vanessa Grant, which could end his marriage and his career. Sandy begrudgingly accepts Nico's instructions to throw the race. On the day of the race, Fontaine puts virtually her entire fortune on 'Garbo' in a last ditch attempt to save her financial security. When Nico finds out, he tells Sandy not to throw the race as planned, as he doesn't want to see Fontaine ruined. Sandy is relieved but during the race, he accidentally falls from the horse anyway. While Fontaine loses her financial security, Nico backs the winning horse which should be enough to keep the mafia off his back for the time being. He promises to take care of Fontaine.

== Film adaptation ==
After the success of the film adaptation of The Stud in 1978, a film version of The Bitch was already in production before Collins' source novel was published, written and directed by Gerry O'Hara based on Collins' manuscript. Released in September 1979, the film differs from the novel in various ways, and omits the first third of the book. The entire subplot with additional characters in Las Vegas where Nico first runs foul of the Mafia is completely omitted, and Nico's problems with the mafia and how he got the stolen ring are kept vague. In the film, Nico is Italian rather than Greek, his surname is Cantafora not Constantine, and his life history is not given any detail. The film also omits most of Fontaine's life in New York, and starts just as she's leaving to go to London. The film also has a more convoluted ending that left the door open for a potential sequel with Fontaine dealing with shady characters from London's underworld. Jackie Collins had anticipated writing a third book in the series, also to be filmed and starring Joan, but this never came to pass. Instead, she went on to write the first of her Santangelo mafia-themed novels, 1981's Chances.
