= Stud =

Stud may refer to:

== Animals ==
- Stud (animal), an animal retained for breeding
  - Stud farm, a property where livestock are bred
- A male dog (more often only used in breeding)

== Arts and entertainment ==
=== Film and television ===
- The Stud (film), a 1978 film starring Joan Collins and Oliver Tobias
- Studs (film), a 2006 Irish film by Paul Mercier
- Studs McGirdle, a character in the film Cars
- Studs (game show), a dating show from the early 1990s
- "Studs" (The Detectives), a 1993 television episode

=== Other ===
- Stud (band), a British progressive rock group
- "Stud", a song by Troye Sivan from In A Dream, 2020
- The Stud (novel), a 1969 novel by Jackie Collins
- The Stud, a 1991 novel by Barbara Delinsky
- The Stud (bar), a gay bar in San Francisco
- Stud poker, a card game with numerous variations, including:
  - Five-card stud
  - Seven-card stud
  - Caribbean stud poker
- Stud Stennett (1907–1989), American football player

== Hardware ==
- Cleat (shoe), a protrusion on the sole of a shoe worn for playing sports
- Shirt stud, a decorative fastener
- Stud earring, a small piece of jewelry worn on the ear
- Threaded rod, a kind of bolt
- Wall stud, a vertical member in construction
- Studs, small metal pins on a snow tire to increase traction

== Slang ==
- "Stud", slang for a promiscuous male
- "Stud", slang for an African-American lesbian who is perceived as masculine

== See also ==
- Stud contact system, a power supply system for tramways
- Stud welding, a form of spot welding
