= Hurlstone =

Hurlstone may refer to:

- Hurlstone Park, New South Wales
- Hurlstone Agricultural High School
- Hurlstone Point
- Gary Hurlstone (born 1963), English professional footballer
- Robin Hurlstone (1958–2026), English actor
- William Yeates Hurlstone, an English composer
