= The Stud (novel) =

1969 novel by Jackie Collins

- First image
- Author: Jackie Collins
- Language: English
- Genre: Fiction
- Published: 1969
- Publisher: W. H. Allen & Co.
- Publication place: United Kingdom

The Stud is the second novel by British novelist Jackie Collins, published in 1969 by W. H. Allen & Co. with jacket photography by Lewis Morley. The names of the central characters in the first edition were changed in later editions following the release of the film adaptation. For example, the titular "stud" Tony Burg was renamed Tony Blake, and the character Fontaine Khaled was originally named Fontaine Damon. The novel was edited in later editions to make it appear more contemporary. Collins also re-wrote the book, re-issuing it as an e-book, along with its follow-up, The Bitch.

== Plot synopsis ==
Fontaine Khaled is the wife of a wealthy Arab businessman, Benjamin Khaled. She spends his money on her nightclub Hobo, partying, shopping, and lovers. She hires a manager, Tony Blake, to run her club, but it is understood that his job security is dependent on him satisfying her sexual demands. Tony loses interest in Fontaine and turns his attention to her young step-daughter Alexandra, who uses him to make another man she is interested in jealous. Tony, oblivious to this fact, pursues Alexandra while double-crossing Fontaine by making a deal with businessman Ian Thaine to buy his own club by saying that Fontaine is in on the deal. Meanwhile, Benjamin's attentions stray to model Dolores after he finds out about Fontaine's various affairs. When Fontaine is faced with Benjamin divorcing her and Tony double-crossing and leaving her to set up his own club she puts the wheels in motion to turn the tables.

== Public reaction ==
British romance novelist Barbara Cartland condemned the book as "Filthy, disgusting and unnecessary", though it soon made the bestseller lists like Collins' previous novel.

== Cover ==
Hundreds of women were auditioned by Morley and Collins for the cover photo in which the stud of the title is viewed at the center of a prism of shapely women's legs. Over a decade later book jackets of many of Collin's titles, including The Stud, featured art by the English commercial artist, Adrian Chesterman.

== Film version ==
Plans for a film version of The Stud were made early in the 1970s, when it was planned for Tony Curtis to star. However, the project fell through and was not given the go-ahead until 1977. Collins' sister, actress Joan Collins, had fallen on hard times and was finding it harder and harder to secure roles in her floundering career. She persuaded sister Jackie to sell her the film rights to the book and found herself an investor - a casual acquaintance she had met at the Cannes Film Festival. Forty-five-year-old Joan Collins herself starred as Fontaine Khaled, while Swiss-born actor Oliver Tobias and English actress Emma Jacobs were cast in the roles of Tony Blake and Alexandra Khaled. The film was a big hit and revived the career of Joan Collins. The success of the film led Jackie Collins to write a sequel, The Bitch, which was published the following year in 1979 and was also made into a film, again starring sister Joan. Both films were successful, and led to Aaron Spelling casting Collins as Alexis Carrington for the primetime soap opera Dynasty.
