= Brent Walker =

Entertainment and property company

Brent Walker was a British company involved in property, gambling, distilled beverages and pubs. In the 1970s, the company branched out into film production. It was founded by George Walker, the brother of the boxer Billy Walker.

In 1991, following the accumulation of debts which had been used to finance acquisitions, George Walker was ousted from the company and its board sold its remaining investments under the supervision of its bankers.

== George Walker ==
Born in London, George Walker career began as a porter at Billingsgate Fish Market. Like his brother, Walker became a boxer of the 1950s. Following his retirement from the ring he undertook a number of business ventures including Dolly's nightclub in London.

== Foundations of the company ==
In 1974, Walker arranged a reverse takeover of Hackney and Hendon Greyhound Company, a stock market listed company, sold his own business interests to it and changed its name to Brent Walker. Using land from the Hendon Greyhound Stadium, Brent Walker entered into a joint venture with Hammerson Estates to develop the Brent Cross Shopping Centre, taking a 25% stake. Brent Walker sold its interest in Brent Cross to Hammerson in 1976.

== Operations, acquisitions and disposals ==
The films The Stud (1978), The Bitch and Quadrophenia (both 1979) were financed by Brent Walker in the 1970s, through Brent Walker Film Distributors Limited. Video productions of Gilbert & Sullivan operas were produced in the 1980s.

In 1979, Brent Walker acquired the Camera Effects post-production and visual effects company which was sold to Rank Organisation in 1981.

In 1987, the company acquired Goldcrest Films for £5 million, through the Masterman joint venture with the Ensign Trust. Later that year, it bought a 27% stake in troubled television production company Trillion for £12 million, and bought out shares from Charterhall, the European investor company.

Brent Walker operated Southend Pier between 1986 and 1988. It also acquired the Kursaal amusement park in Southend in 1988. The local authority stepped in to take over this dilapidated property in the 1990s.

The London Trocadero, a property in London's West End originally built as a restaurant, was acquired in 1987 as a joint venture with Robin Power, an Irish developer. Brent Walker sold its interest to Power in 1991 at a substantial loss.

Elstree Studios, Borehamwood were acquired in 1988. Brent Walker obtained planning permission for the construction of a Tesco supermarket on the backlot and the studios fell out of use. Faced with a potential compulsory purchase, Brent Walker sold the remaining property to Hertsmere Council in 1996.

The Cameron and Tolly Cobbold Breweries were acquired from Ellerman Investments, a company owned by the Barclay brothers, in 1988 for £240m. The company closed Tolly Cobbold's Cliff Brewery in Ipswich in 1989 and transferred production to Cameron's Hartlepool brewery. The Hartlepool brewery was sold to Wolverhampton and Dudley Breweries in 1992.

Pubmaster was formed by Brent Walker as an estate of mainly tenanted pub properties including 386 Grand Metropolitan pubs acquired in 1988 and 800 pubs acquired with the Cameron and Tolly Cobbold breweries. Pubmaster was sold in November 1996 to Silverfleet Capital Limited, a private equity group. At the time it comprised 1600 pubs.

In 1988, Brent Walker purchased the distilled beverage company Whyte & Mackay. The company was sold to American Brands (later called Fortune Brands) in 1990.

The William Hill chain of betting shops and Mecca Bookmakers, were acquired from Grand Metropolitan in 1989 for £685 million. In 1997 William Hill was sold to Nomura for £700m.

== Collapse ==
Brent Walker accumulated debts of £1.2bn by 1991 with debt-financed acquisitions. A collapse in property prices and high interest rates placed the company in financial difficulties. George Walker was ousted from the Board in 1991 and the group's bankers took control, enforcing a process of sale of the company's assets. Following the sale of William Hill in 1997, the company was removed from the stock exchange and wound up.

== Fraud trials ==
In the 1980s, actress Joan Collins launched a multi-million pound lawsuit against Brent Walker (who arranged finance and distribution for the films The Stud and The Bitch) at London's High Court, in a dispute about royalties. Collins alleged fraud, conspiracy, and breach of contract, after royalty payments stopped being sent regularly from 1980 onwards and without details. In February 1986, before a verdict was reached, Collins accepted £147,233 as an interim settlement in the matter on the condition that independent accountants were hired to determine the true extent of the films financial success and how much she and her partners were owed (her partners were named as former husband Ron Kass, and sister Jackie Collins). Brent Walker agreed to this on the condition that Collins drop the allegations of fraud and conspiracy from her case, and that the accountants' fee would not exceed £40,000.

In 1994, the Serious Fraud Office brought a case against George Walker and Brent Walker's former finance director Wilfred Aquilina, accusing them of inflating profits at the film division by £19.3m in an effort to lure investors. After a four and a half month trial costing an estimated £40m, Walker was cleared of all charges, while Aquilina was convicted of false accounting, sentenced to 18 months imprisonment suspended for two years, and fined £25,000.
