= Camera Effects =

British film opticals studio

Camera Effects Ltd
- Company type: Limited company, closed in 1987
- Industry: Post production and visual effects
- Founded: United Kingdom (1964)
- Headquarters: Soho, London, UK
- Number of employees: 27 (1985)

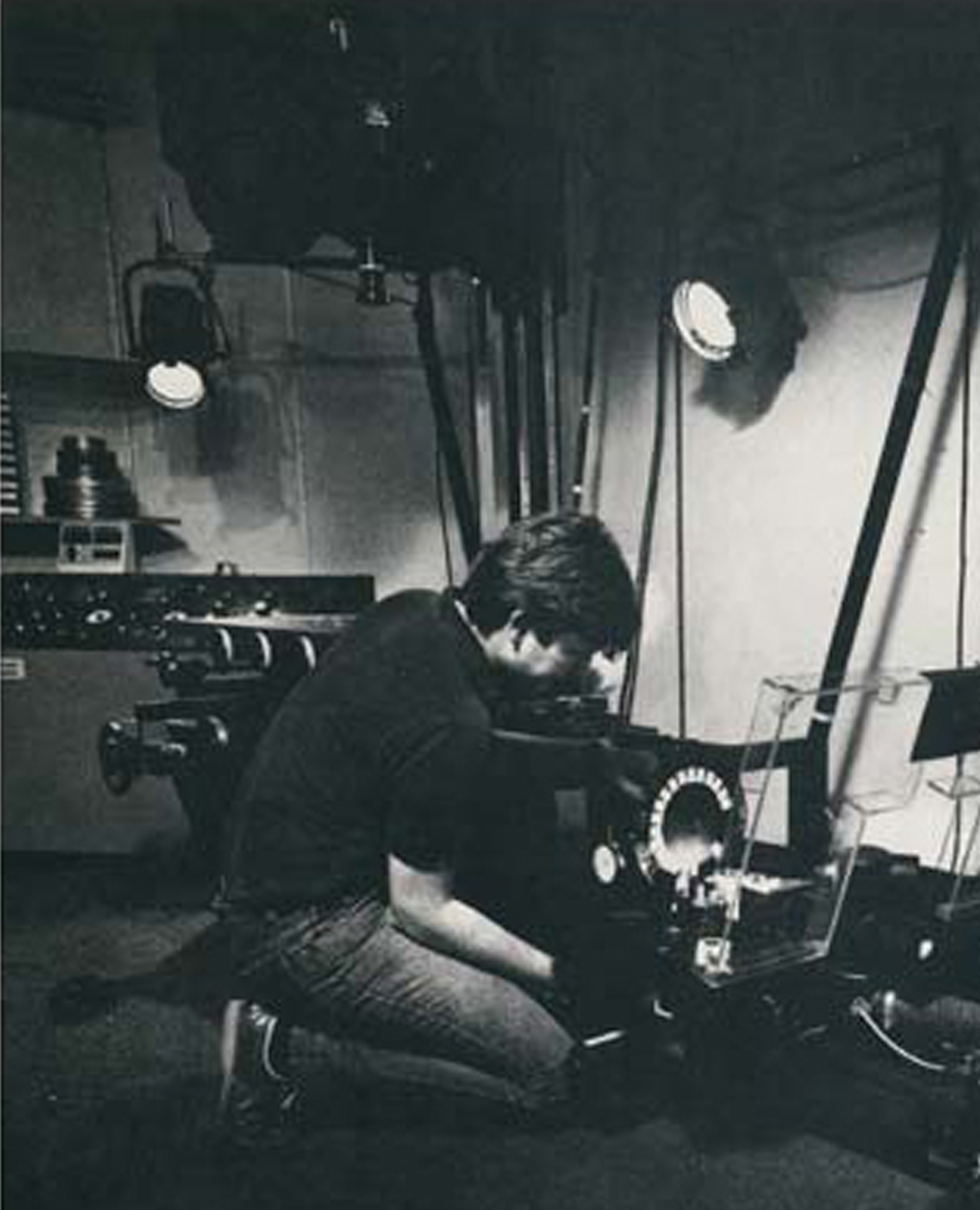
Aerial Image Camera Supervising Cameraman Bob Roach adjusting the Oxberry projector of an aerial image system at Camera Effects, Wardour Street

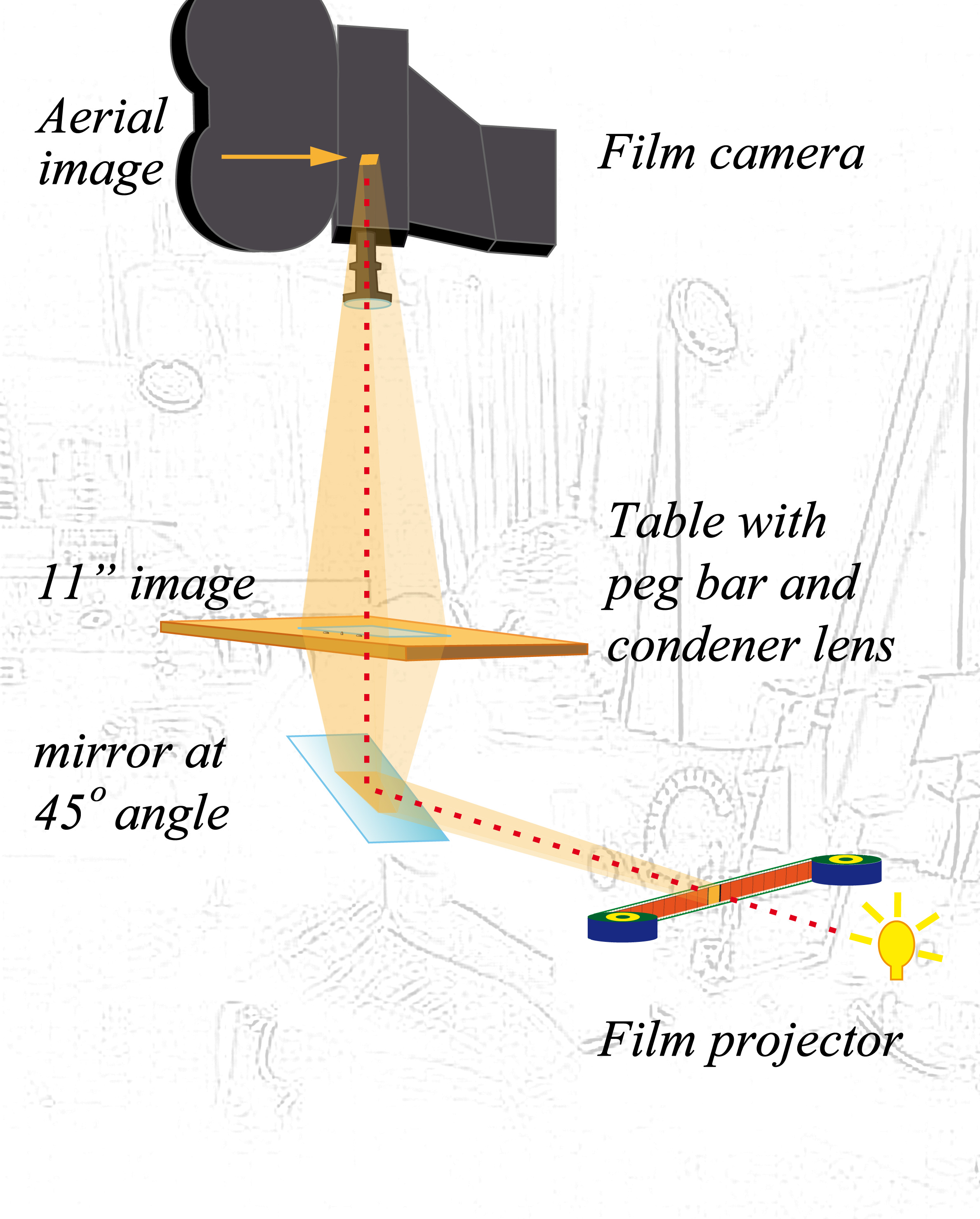
Aerial Image Camera Illustration An 'aerial image' is projected at a point in mid-air which is captured by the camera. The image is also sharp at the table for shooting artwork and rotoscoping purposes.

Camera Effects was a film opticals (post-production and visual effects) studio based in Soho, London, from 1964 till its closure in 1987. It had a world wide reputation for producing film special effects and titles for television commercial and feature film projects. The company produced title sequences for major features such as The Three Musketeers, The Rocky Horror Picture Show, Tommy, the Superman films and Supergirl.

The company was started by Roy Pace using an animation rostrum camera in a basement at 2 Bourchier Street in 1964. It moved premises to 6 Dean Street, then to 147 Wardour Street before finally settling at 8–11 Bateman Street as the biggest optical house in Soho with six camera rooms, an optical printer and two film studios.

Film opticals were created using Oxberry aerial image cameras, with "many animation techniques used in the process." The combination of an animation stand with a 35mm projector enabled the fast turnaround of film opticals and was a system popular with designers demanding precise title layouts by rotoscoping directly from the animation stand.

Referring to her own experience at the company, Janet Yale said "This was before computer graphics and all film effects work was done with chemicals, rostrum cameras and optical printers. It was basically a craft skill, there was no formal training for it."

As demand grew in the Spanish and Turkish commercials sectors, Camera Effects set up a production office in Barcelona and an independent aerial image camera unit in Istanbul, with cameramen from London doing 'tour of duties' on a rotation basis.

== Ownership ==
Roy Pace sold Camera Effects to Brent Walker in 1979 who in turn sold on to the Rank Organization in 1981. The company directors (Sheldon Elbourne, Malcolm Bubb, Gary Pearlman and Pat Conway) acquired the company in April 1984, bringing the company back into private ownership for a few years before selling to Rushes in 1986. The Virgin Group bought Rushes the following year, shutting Camera Effects down in 1987 as the industry embraced new digital technologies, keeping the profitable motion control film studio side of the business going. The Virgin Group dissolved Camera Effects on 25 September 2001.
