= Hendon Greyhound Stadium =

Former greyhound racing venue in London

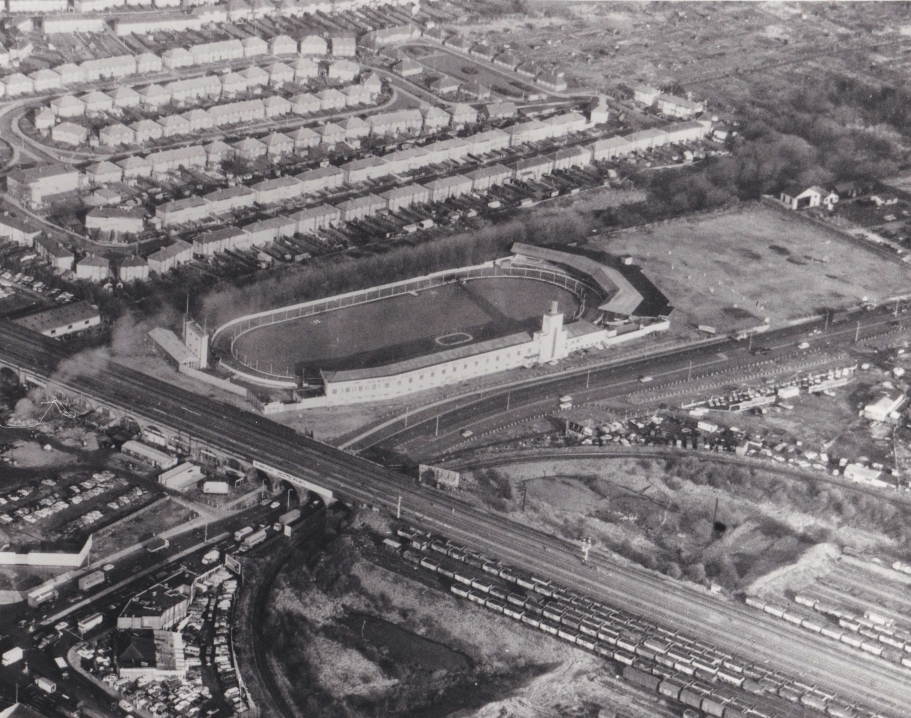
- circa.1960
- Interactive map of Hendon Greyhound Stadium
- Location: Hendon, London
- Coordinates: 51°34′22″N 0°13′46″W

Construction
- Opened: 1935
- Closed: 1972

Hendon Greyhound Stadium was a greyhound racing stadium in Hendon, north London.

== Origins ==
The area of Hendon famously has special links to greyhound racing based on the fact that on the 6 March 1876 the first attempt at mechanical racing took place on a 400 yards long straight course near the Welsh Harp in the London suburb of Hendon. This was fourteen years before the patent for circular tracks had been taken out and fifty years before the first oval race was held at Belle Vue Stadium. During 1934 an attempt to start racing greyhounds around the Hendon Cricket ground failed after the owners of the ground, the Wearmouth Coal Company Ltd rejected the proposal.

One year later in 1935 a stadium had been constructed on spare land between the River Brent and the relatively new North Circular Road directly east of the main London, Midland and Scottish railway line.

== Opening ==
The opening meeting was on 5 March 1935, which featured the band of the 7th Queen's Own Hussars and the ceremony was performed by the Mayor and Mayoress of Hendon (Councillor and Mrs. Brook Flowers). The stadium consisted of one main grandstand building along the home straight and a capacity of 6,000 spectators. The hare system used was an 'Outside Sumner' with a track circumference of 398 yards grass course with sharp bends.

== History ==
The owners of Hackney Wick Stadium owned Hendon but ran the company as Hendon Stadium Ltd. totalisator turnover figures peaked at £2 million just after World War II. Main events included the Calcutta Cup and Welsh Harp Cup.

Also after the War, Hendon and Hackney became the Hackney and Hendon Greyhounds Ltd company. The resident kennels featured six ranges with each able to house up to fifty greyhounds, paddocks sat next to each range with cooking facilities and a veterinary surgeon on site. The kennel fees were 17s 6d for each greyhound.

In the 1950s, Mr D G Lewis became the Racing Manager followed by Fred Whitehead becoming the Director of Racing for Hendon and Hackney. Lewis would switch to sister track Hackney with Michael Marks brought in to replace him. The pair would once again swap places in the 1960s sixties with Lewis returning to Hendon.

During the 1960s racing continued on two evenings per week (Monday and Saturday at 7.45pm) and amenities included a restaurant and five additional buffet and licensed bars with principal events called the North Circular Marathon, Burletta Stakes and L.V. Chairman's Cup. A major event arrived in 1969 after Hendon was awarded the Guineas following the closure of Park Royal Stadium. With the end of Park Royal and New Cross Stadium their Bookmakers Afternoon Greyhound Service (BAGS) fixtures were replaced by Hendon and Hackney.

Attached trainers included Annetts, Reg Bosley, Colebrooke, Paddy Gordon, Hedley and Lionel Maxen, the same group of trainers that supplied the Hackney greyhounds.

== Closure ==
In 1970 businessman George Walker brother of boxing champion Billy Walker arranged a reverse takeover of Hackney and Hendon Greyhounds Stadium Ltd. This meant his private company bought a public company and the new merger resulted in a new company called Brent Walker. This resulted in the end for the Hendon Greyhound Stadium because it was sold to make way for the UK's first stand-alone shopping centre on the site that would soon be known as the Brent Cross shopping centre.

The stadium finally closed on 30 June 1972, it was demolished with some of the land forming the new links to the M1 motorway and the rest being used as parking spaces for the shopping centre.

== Track records ==
Distance yards	Greyhound	Time	Date
475	Tell Nobody	27.65	28 June 1948
475	Prince Chancer	27.18	16 August 1954
650	Rambler's Destiny	39.16	23 August 1947
675	American Rose	39.27	31 August 1962
880	Prince Humphrey	52.34	31 May 1963
475 H	Irish Larry	28.80	19 August 1943
475 H	Stanbrook Rob	28.03	7 August 1961
