= The Loss Adjuster =

2020 British film by Vincent Woods

- Directed by: Vincent Woods
- Screenplay by: Jayney Mackie
- Produced by: Ross Connock; Jayney Mackie
- Starring: Luke Goss; Guy Siner; Kym Marsh; Martin Kemp; Joan Collins
- Cinematography: Franz Pagot
- Edited by: Andy Kemp Executive Producer = Alan Whitehead
- Music by: Walter Mair; Christian Heschl
- Production company: Pink Flamingo Films
- Distributed by: Minerva Pictures
- Release date: 1 December 2020
- Running time: 100 minutes
- Country: United Kingdom
- Language: English

The Loss Adjuster is a 2020 Christmas romantic comedy film written by Jayney Mackie and directed by Vincent Woods and starring Luke Goss, Martin Kemp, Kym Marsh and Joan Collins. Executive Producer Alan Whitehead It was released on 1 December 2020.

== Synopsis ==
The film depicts an unlucky insurance man and the variety of clients that he visits.

== Cast ==
- Luke Goss as Martin Dyer
- Guy Siner as Dr. Norman Wicksteed
- Kym Marsh as Angie Dyer
- Martin Kemp as Lee Leicester
- Lorna Fitzgerald as Emmaline
- David Byrne as Sam Leicester
- Vas Blackwood as The Pawnbroker
- Ross O'Hennessy as Mr. Gimpole
- Michelle Greenidge as Purdy
- Cathy Tyson as Gilda
- Joan Collins as Margaret Rogerton-Sykes
- Tony O'Callaghan as Mr. Henderson
- Elina Saleh as Polly
- Ross Harland as Aiden
- John Beckett as Rob
- Anete Balkena as Georgie
- Poppie Boyes as Mimi
- Suzanne Kendall as Nurse Ali
- Jason Harvey as Parky
- Maurice Byrne as The Vicar

== Production ==
Filming for The Loss Adjuster began in October 2019. The primary cast, consisting of Luke Goss, Joan Collins, Martin Kemp, Guy Siner and Kym Marsh, was announced on 24 February 2020. The film's official trailer was released on 16 October 2020.

== Music ==
The theme song for the film was sung by Beverley Knight, entitled A Christmas Wish. It was released as a single on 11 November 2020.

== Release ==
The Loss Adjuster was released on 1 December 2020 in UK cinemas by Minerva Pictures. It was also released on DVD and online to stream on Amazon Prime, Sky Store and Rakuten TV on the same day.

== Reception ==
Although the film garnered attention due to its high-profile cast, it received generally negative reviews. Ben Abraham of Letterboxd said that The Loss Adjuster was a "boring and empty low budget Christmas film" as well as criticising it for being "poorly constructed both narratively and technically, filled with woefully shoddy editing [...] making it a very tough film to engage with". Kat Halstead of Common Sense Media was a little more sympathetic saying that despite several uses of mild language, "..many of the situations in the movie are serious [but] there are some warm and funny moments to lighten the tone". Despite this, The Loss Adjuster toured cinema festivals worldwide where it picked up awards including Best Feature Film at both the New York Movie Awards and the Florence Film Awards while Joan Collins won Best Lead Actress at the East Europe International Film Festival and Franz Pagot won Best Cinematography in a Feature Film, while Luke Goss and Cathy Tyson were nominated for Best Lead Actor and Best Supporting Actress respectively at the same awards.

== See also ==
- List of Christmas films
