= Jean Gilpin =

British actress (born 1950)

- Born: Elizabeth Gilpin; 9 August 1950 (age 75); London, England
- Other name: Jean Elizabeth
- Education: Bristol University
- Alma mater: Drama Centre London
- Occupation: Actress
- Years active: 1971–present

Jean Gilpin (born 9 August 1950) is a British actress who has appeared in over 200 film, television, and video game projects. Primarily known for her extensive career in voice acting and ADR (Automated Dialogue Replacement), she has voiced major characters in high-profile franchises such as The Elder Scrolls, Dragon Age, Age of Mythology, and Final Fantasy.

== Early life ==
Born in London, Gilpin grew up in a bicultural environment because of her father's career. Her father worked for the United Nations and she thus lived in various locations while growing up, such as China, Cuba, France, Switzerland, Thailand, the Congo, the U.S. (specifically New York City), and Zambia. She attended schools in England, France, Switzerland, and Thailand. She gained a BA in Drama and English from Bristol University before training at the Drama Centre London.

== Career ==
Gilpin first made some brief appearances in BBC Bristol productions as a student in the Bristol University Drama Department. Her first professional theatrical job was a season with the Nottingham Playhouse Company where she received her Equity card. She spent three years at the Glasgow Citizens' Theatre, playing principal boy in their traditional pantomimes, and performing in Noël Coward's Semi-Monde directed by Philip Prowse.

Gilpin spent a year with the Royal Shakespeare Company. She played the Duchess of Vanholt in Faustus with Ian McKellen, directed by John Barton. Her first credited appearance on British television was in the role of Julia in The Duchess of Malfi for the BBC. She's also Janet Milton (the found Mum of John) in the episode Reunion, third season of Survivors.

Gilpin is perhaps best known to British television audiences as Sylvia, a precocious Auxiliary Territorial Service member, the niece of Chief Warden Hodges, who attempts unsuccessfully to seduce Private Pike in "The Making of Private Pike" (first broadcast 9 October 1977) in the final series of Dad's Army. Gilpin also won supporting roles in several British films of the 1970s including Catch Me a Spy (1971), Feelings (1974), The Stud (1978) and The World Is Full of Married Men (1979). She also featured in several British television commercials, notably as The Avon Lady.

After ten years working in British theatre and television, Gilpin moved to Los Angeles. Her first role there was in Anne Sexton's Transformations at the Coronet Theatre. She also began to take roles in television and film. She performed in Steven Berkoff's Greek at the Matrix Theatre and the ensemble won the BATCC Award. She co-produced and appeared in the LA premiere of Jean Reynolds' Dance With Me, which was nominated for an LADCC for ensemble.

Since the 1980s, Gilpin has mainly worked as a voice actress on more than 200 projects. She worked regularly on Max Steel. More recently, she has featured as a voice actor in video games, including Neverwinter Nights and James Bond 007: Nightfire. In particular, she has worked regularly for Bethesda Softworks, and can be heard in such games as The Elder Scrolls Online and The Elder Scrolls V: Skyrim as Elenwen, Boethiah, and Meridia. One of her best known roles is Knight Commander Meredith in Dragon Age II, Master of Orion: Conquer the Stars, in King's Quest as Pillare and Merlwyb Bloefhiswyn in the English version of Final Fantasy XIV: A Realm Reborn, credited as Jean Elizabeth. She also voiced Sangheili character Makhee 'Chava in Halo 5: Guardians and voiced Amanra in Age of Mythology and its sequels.

Gilpin voiced a computer called Stacie in the film Nuclear Hurricane in 2007. She also voiced Mother Helen and various characters in 2011's Dead Island, credited as Elizabeth Gilpin, and voiced The Mother in Dying Light: The Following in 2016. She provided a vocal cameo in the 2021 film Dune as an Ancestral Bene Gesserit.

== Filmography ==
=== Television series ===
Year	Title	Role	Notes
1972	Stage 2	Julia	Episode: The Duchess of Malfi
1973	Wessex Tales	Mrs. Sarah Drenkard	Episode: Barbara of the House Grebe
1976	Softly, Softly: Task Force	Terrorist	Episode: There's Always Tomorrow
1976	Angels	Deborah Harper	Episode: Babes in the Woods
1977	Survivors	Janet Millon	Episode: Reunion
1977	Z-Cars	Marie	Episode: Skeletons
1977	Dad's Army	Sylvia	Episode: The Making of Private Pike
1978	Come Back Mrs. Noah	The Technician	Episode: The Housing Problem
1978	Premiere	Attendant	Episode: Something's Wrong
1978	Tycoon	Helena	Episode: Out of the Speaking Dark
1978	The Professionals	Debra	Episode: First Night
1978	Play for Today	Sandra	Episode: Return Fare
1979	The Omega Factor	Sarah Ashley	Episode: St. Anthony's Fire
1981	Quincy, M.E.	Mrs. Eddington	Episode: By Their Faith
2016	Dying Light	The Mother	2 episodes
2017	Legion	Color Lady / Hat Lady	Episode: Chapter 1
2018	Saluting Dad's Army	Herself	S1. Episode: 4
2023	Candis Cayne's Secret Garden	Poppy Seeds	Episode: I Have a Secret

=== Anime series ===
List of dubbing performances in anime series
Year	Title	Role	Notes
1991	3×3 Eyes	Ms. Wong / Newscaster	English version

=== Animation ===
List of voice performances in animation
Year	Title	Role(s)	Notes
2000	Max Steel	Scientist / Civilians	Episode: Shadows
2017	Dragons: Race to the Edge Season 4	Dragon Trainer / Village people	Episode: Dire Straites
2018	Dragons: Race to the Edge Season 7	Lady / Crowds lady	Episode: No Bark, All Bite
2022	Dragon Age: Absolution	Meredith Stannard	Episode: The Price of Salvation
2024–2025	Blood of Zeus	Gaia	8 episodes

=== Film ===
List of voice performances in direct-to-video and television films
Year	Title	Role	Notes
1971	To Catch a Spy	Ground Stewardess	
1974	Feelings	Receptionist	Base on Feelings
1976	The Bawdy Adventures of Tom Jones	Lady at Ball	
1978	The Stud	Nika	
1979	The World Is Full of Married Men	Miss Field	
1979	The Bitch	Party Lady	
1980	The Scarlett O'Hara War	Margeret Sullivan	
1981	Nighthawks	Cop lady / Metropolitan Museum of Art Lady / Party ladies	
1984	Nausicaä of the Valley of the Wind	Valley's lady / Child's mother	Additional voices
1985	Police Story	Sergeant / Operator / Town civilians	English dub
1988	Outlaw of Gor	Shop Lady	Additional voices
1990	Flashback	Elizabeth	
1990	Three Men and a Little Lady	Jean	Voice
1991	Armour of God II: Operation Condor	Hotel receptionist	Additional voices
1992	The Muppet Christmas Carol	Puppet / Customer / Children	Voice
1992	Aladdin	Agrabah citizens / Maid / Crowd ladies / Beautiful girls	Voice
1996	First Strike	Australian Group Lady	English version
1996	Independence Day	New York citizens / Soldiers / Lady	Additional voices
1996	Jingle All the Way	Christmas celebrating lady / Shop worker	Voices
1997	Zeus and Roxanne	Neighbor lady	
1997	Mr. Nice Guy	Announcement lady	English dub
1998	Quest for Camelot	Camelot civilians	Additional voices
1998	Godzilla	Students / Computer voice	Voices
1999	That Marino Thing	The Therapist	Short
1999	Diplomatic Siege	Embassy Lady	
2000	The Flintstones in Viva Rock Vegas	Lady in car	
2001	Cats & Dogs	Factory worker	
2001	Shrek	Fairies / Duloc civilians / Fairy-tale creatures	Additional voices
2001	Lara Croft: Tomb Raider	Researcher	
2003	Atlantis: Milo's Return	Inger Allyson	
2003	Just Married	Hotel lady	
2004	EuroTrip	Bus stop lady	
2004	The Chronicles of Riddick	Hooded lady	Additional voices
2005	Lincoln's Eyes	Lady	Short
2006	Eragon	Magician	Additional voices
2006	The Omen	Kid's mother	
2006	Flushed Away	Rats / Rita's siblings	Additional voices
2006	A Good Year	Cafe Lady / London lady	Additional voices
2006	Garfield: A Tail of Two Kitties	Animals / London people / Park lady	Additional voices
2007	The Seeker	Warrior	
2007	Nuclear Hurricane	Staci	
2007	Fantastic Four: Rise of the Silver Surfer	Civilians	Additional voices
2008	The Day the Earth Stood Still	Alien	Voice
2010	Shrek Forever After	Witches	Additional voices
2010	Legend of the Boneknapper Dragon	Villager lady	Additional voices
2011	Rio	Rio's civilians / Rio Carnival parade ladies	Additional voices
2011	Fatboy	Mother	Short
2011	Your Highness	Maiden	Voices
2011	Monte Carlo	Hotel customer	
2011	The Mischievous Case of Cordeelia Botkin	The Narrator	Short
2012	Chronicle	High School Teacher	
2012	Madagascar 3: Europe's Most Wanted	Casino Lady / Casino workers / Circus crowds	Additional voices
2012	Life of Pi	Indian teacher	
2013	Runner Runner	Police	
2013	47 Ronin	Warrior	English dub
2013	The East	Agent	
2013	Frozen	Arendelle's people / Arendelle's lady	Additional voices
2014	How to Train Your Dragon 2	Dragons / Village women / Crowds	
2014	Dawn of the Planet of the Apes	Female Apes / Survivor	
2014	X-Men: Days of Future Past	Civilians / Lady	Additional voices
2014	Night at the Museum: Secret of the Tomb	Archaeologist	
2014	Postman Pat: The Movie	Miss Hubbard / Crowd Lady / Pat Wannabe 3	
2014	The Fault in Our Stars	Nurse / Doctor / ER Nurse	Additional voices
2015	The Last Witch Hunter	Witches voice / Airplane passenger	
2016	Now You See Me 2	Women in crowd	
2016	The House Guest	Womba	Short
2016	Trolls	Troll	Additional voices
2017	The Mountain Between Us	Airport Lady	Additional voices
2017	Magik Randy	Randy's Mother	Short
2018	Aquaman	Villager / Store Keeper	Voices
2018	Incredibles 2	Citizens / Fleeing lady / Scared girl	Additional voices
2019	Dark Phoenix	City lady	Voice
2019	Detective Pikachu	Lady	Additional voices
2019	How to Train Your Dragon: The Hidden World	Villagers / Dragons	
2019	Missing Link	Old Worlder	
2020	The Call of the Wild	Passerby	Additional voices
2021	Validation	Mrs. Trafecante	Short
2021	Dune	Bene Gesserit Ancestors	Voice
2022	Chip 'n Dale: Rescue Rangers	Mrs. House	Voice
2023	The Nun II	Nun	Voice

=== Podcast series ===
List of voice performances in podcast
Year	Title	Role(s)	Notes
2009	William Nicholson: Shadowlands	Registrar	Voice
2018	Lady Windermere's Fan: The Radio Play	Lady Jedburgh	Voice

=== Video games ===
List of voice performances in video games
Year	Title	Role	Notes
1998	Titanic Explorer	Laura Francatelli / Emily Ryerson	PC
1999	Command & Conquer: Tiberian Sun	Eva / Various voices	PC
2000	Escape from Monkey Island	Noble Ladies / Civilians	PlayStation 2
2000	Nox	Johanna	PC
2002	Neverwinter Nights	The Guardian	PC
2002	Age of Mythology	Amanra	macOS
2002	James Bond 007: Nightfire	Civilians	PlayStation 2
2003	Age of Mythology: The Titans	Amanra / Additional voices	macOS
2003	Star Wars: Knights of the Old Republic	Rahasia	Xbox
2004	EverQuest II	Queen Antonia Bayle	PC
2004	World of Warcraft	Additional voices	PC
2004	Call of Duty: United Offensive	Russian Soldier	PC
2004	GoldenEye: Rogue Agent	Additional voices	PlayStation 2
2005	Age of Empires III	Amelia Black	PC
2005	Call of Duty 2	Various voices	Xbox 360
2006	Gothic 3	Additional voices	PC
2007	Eternal Sonata	Additional voices	Xbox 360
2007	Age of Empires III: The WarChiefs	Amelia Black	PC
2007	Mass Effect	Asari / Additional voices / Agents / Asari Clone / Krogans	Xbox 360
2008	Legendary	Civilians / Monsters / Additional voices	Xbox 360
2008	Saints Row 2	The Local Pedestrian Population	Xbox 360
2008	Dead Space	Additional voices	PlayStation 3
2009	Dragon Age: Origins	Guards / Mages at Tower / Denerim civilians / Elfs	Xbox 360
2009	The Lord of the Rings: Conquest	Female Mages	PlayStation 3
2010	Final Fantasy XIV	Merlwyb Bloefhiswyn	English version
2010	Mass Effect 2	Asari / Additional voices	Xbox 360
2011	The Elder Scrolls V: Skyrim	Elenwen / Meridia / Boethiah	Xbox 360 / PC / PlayStation 3
2011	Dead Island	Mother Helen / Claire / Deanna	Xbox 360
2011	Dragon Age II	Meredith Stannard	Xbox 360
2012	The Secret World	Dame Julia Beaumont	PC
2012	Kinect Star Wars	TC-38	Xbox 360
2012	Mass Effect 3	Asari / Krogans / Ladies / Additional voices	Xbox 360
2012	Diablo III	Female Mystic	Xbox 360
2012	Dragon's Dogma	Lola / Pawns / Agnes / Sofiah / Seneschal	Additional voices
2013	Dead Island: Riptide	Jane Hanson / Nina / Kitty	Xbox 360
2013	Dragon's Dogma: Dark Arisen	Lola / Pawns / Agnes / Sofiah / Katlyn / Seneschal	Xbox 360
2013	Final Fantasy XIV: A Realm Reborn	Merlwyb Bloefhiswyn	English version
2014	Middle-earth: Shadow of Mordor	Sauron / Additional voices	PlayStation 4
2014	Dragon Age: Inquisition	Chantry Mother / Revered Mother / Chantry members / Additional voices	PlayStation 4
2014	The Elder Scrolls Online	Elenwen / Meridia / Boethiah	Xbox One
2015	King's Quest	Pillare	PlayStation 4
2015	Dying Light	Dahlia	PlayStation 4
2015	Halo 5: Guardians	Mahkee 'Chava	Xbox One
2015	Final Fantasy XIV: Heavensward	Merlwyb Bloefhiswyn	PlayStation 5
2016	Dying Light: The Following	The Mother	PlayStation 4
2016	Master of Orion: Conquer the Stars	Klackon Empress	PC
2016	Halo 5: Forge	Mahkee 'Chava	PC
2017	Horizon Zero Dawn	Robots / Robotic creatures	PlayStation 4
2017	Nioh	Additional voices	PlayStation 4
2018	Red Dead Redemption 2	Mrs. Johnson / Armadillo civilians / Additional voices / Emerald Ranch lady	PlayStation 4
2019	Imperator: Rome	Additional voices	PC
2019	Borderlands 3	Various voices	PlayStation 4
2020	Final Fantasy VII Remake	Civilians	PlayStation 4
2020	World of Warcraft: Shadowlands	Additional voices	PC
2021	Mass Effect Legendary Edition	Asari / Krogans	PlayStation 4
2021	New World	Marsh Walker Afolabi / Master Fisher Klaus / Captain Isabella / Watcher Chang / Warden DeLeo / Warden Phan	PlayStation 5
2021	Resident Evil Village	Zombies / Additional voices	PlayStation 5
2021	Final Fantasy VII: Remake - Intergrade	Additional voices / Civilians	PlayStation 5
2022	Immortality	Additional voices	PlayStation 5
2023	Hogwarts Legacy	Wizards / Teachers / Additional voices	PlayStation 5
2023	Final Fantasy XVI	Valisthea civilians / Sanbreque soldiers / Additional voices	PlayStation 5
2023	New World: Rise of the Angry Earth	Marsh Walker Afolabi / Master Fisher Klaus / Warden Deleo	PC
2024	New World: Aeternum	Marsh Walker Afolabi / Master Fisher Klaus / Warden Deleo	PlayStation 5
2024	Age of Mythology: Retold	Amanra	PlayStation 5

=== Narrator ===
Year	Title	Role	Notes
2026	The Story of an Hour	Narrator	Short

== Awards and nominations ==
Year	Award	Category	Result	Title	Ref.
2013	Margaret Hayden Rector Awards	Best Actress	Won	Dance With Me	
2013	Los Angeles Drama Critics Circle Awards	Best Actress	Nominated	Dance With Me	
2014	SFBATCC Award	Best Actress	Won	Greek	
