= The Bitch (film) =

1979 British film by Gerry O'Hara

- British film poster
- Directed by: Gerry O'Hara
- Written by: Gerry O'Hara
- Based on: The Bitch by Jackie Collins
- Produced by: John Quested
- Starring: Joan Collins; Michael Coby; Ian Hendry; Mark Burns; Sue Lloyd; Carolyn Seymour; Doug Fisher; John Ratzenberger; Pamela Salem; Kenneth Haigh
- Cinematography: Dennis Lewiston
- Edited by: Eddy Joseph
- Music by: Biddu
- Production companies: Brent Walker Film Productions; Spritebowl-Bitch Film Productions
- Distributed by: Brent Walker Film Distributors
- Release dates: 19 September 1979 (Premiere); 20 September 1979 (London)
- Running time: 94 minutes
- Country: United Kingdom
- Language: English
- Budget: £450,000
- Box office: £7.5 million (Video Rentals £1.5 million)

The Bitch is a 1979 British drama film directed by Gerry O'Hara. It is a sequel to The Stud (1978) and, like its predecessor, is based on a novel by the British author Jackie Collins and stars her sister Joan Collins as Fontaine Khaled. Both films were made for a relatively small sum but were highly profitable at the box office, and were among the first successes in the emerging home video market of the early 1980s.

== Plot ==
Following from where The Stud left off, Fontaine Khaled is now a divorcee. While she still leads an extravagant jetset lifestyle and did get a rather hefty divorce settlement, she no longer has the financial security of being a billionaire's wife and her once-successful London nightclub, "The Hobo", is now failing due to a newer club taking away most of the former patrons. While on a flight returning to London from New York, she meets handsome Italian gambler Nico Cantafora. In order to impress Fontaine, Nico pretends he is a wealthy businessman, though he is actually a conman who owes money to the mafia, and he covertly uses Fontaine to smuggle a stolen diamond ring through airport customs which he intends to sell in London to pay off his debts.

Nico later tracks Fontaine down in order to retrieve the ring she unwittingly carried through customs for him. They spend the night together but when she discovers that he planted the ring in her coat, she throws him out. However, when Nico later learns that the ring is a fake, he gives it to Fontaine as a light-hearted gift and she forgives him. Meanwhile, Fontaine's own financial problems continue to mount and her financial advisor and confidante Arnold Rinstead warns her that she is rapidly running out of money. To combat this, she attempts to restore her failing nightclub to its former glory. Meanwhile, she learns of Nico's mob connections after he is beaten up by local gangsters due to the money he still owes them.

Later, Fontaine and Nico are invited to the country estate of Fontaine's best friends, Leonard and Vanessa Grant. The Grants own a racehorse named Plato that is favourite to win an upcoming high-stakes derby. Still in debt to the mafia, Nico is instructed by local gangland boss Thrush Feathers to ensure that Plato loses the race. To this effect, Nico blackmails the horse's jockey to throw the race. Fontaine overhears Nico's plan and meets with Feathers to get a cut of the deal with him, which could solve her financial problems. Feathers agrees so that Fontaine will not interfere with his plans and will also be indebted to him.

On the day of the race, the jockey falls off the horse as planned and loses the race. Fontaine pretends to Nico that she gambled her entire fortune on Plato to win and is now broke, but Nico is ecstatic because he backed the winning horse and now believes he can get the mafia off his back once and for all. However, the mafia have other ideas for him and after he gives Fontaine his winning tickets to collect on his behalf, he is carted off by Feathers' henchmen. Fontaine, meanwhile, goes to collect a double payout - with Nico's winning tickets and her cut from Feathers for going along with his scam.

With the money she made from the horse race scam, and her nightclub a success again, Fontaine is saved from financial ruin. But when she arrives at her club one evening, she meets Feathers there who tells everyone he is now the club's new owner.

== Cast ==
- Joan Collins as Fontaine Khaled
- Michael Coby as Nico Cantafora
- Kenneth Haigh as Arnold Rinstead
- Ian Hendry as Thrush Feathers
- Pamela Salem as Lynn
- Sue Lloyd as Vanessa Grant
- Mark Burns as Leonard Grant
- John Ratzenberger as Hal Leonard
- Carolyn Seymour as Polly Logan
- Doug Fisher as Sammy
- Peter Wight as Ricky
- George Sweeney as Sandy Roots
- Chris Jagger as Tony Langham
- Sharon Fussey as Sammy's Girl
- Maurice Thorogood as Paul
- Bill Mitchell as Bernie
- Alibe Parsons as Bernice
- Mela White as Mrs. Walters
- Maurice O'Connell as John-Jo
- Anthony Heaton as Luke
- Timothy Carlton as Jamie
- Jill Melford as Sharon
- Jean Gilpin as Party Lady
- Peter Burton as Hotel Night Manager
- Annie Lambert as Hotel Desk Clerk
- Steve Plytas as Louis Almond
- Graham Simpson as Mario
- Grant Santino as Disco Dancer
- Cherry Gillespie as Disco Girl
- William Van Der Pye as Disc Jockey
- Tai Ling as Mai Ling
- Kari Ann as Marinka
- Bill Nighy as Flower Delivery Boy (uncredited)

== Production notes ==
- Jackie Collins had apparently given her sister Joan the film rights to both The Stud and The Bitch for free so that they could be turned into movies. After funding was secured, the films were co-produced by the sisters' husbands at the time (Oscar Lerman, who was married to Jackie, and Ron Kass, who was married to Joan).
- Although The Stud novel was made into a film nine years after its 1969 publication, The Bitch novel was published in the same year the film was released.
- The film differs from Collins' novel in some ways, and omits an entire subplot with additional characters in Las Vegas where Nico first runs foul of the Mafia. In the novel, Nico is Greek rather than Italian, his surname is Constantine, not Cantafora, and his entire life history is detailed. The novel also depicts Fontaine's life in New York in some detail, whereas the film starts just as she's leaving New York. The novel contains a more romantic ending with Fontaine losing most of her remaining assets by backing the losing horse but Nico winning and promising to take care of her, whereas the film has a more convoluted ending that left the door open for a potential sequel with Fontaine dealing with shady characters from London's underworld. Jackie Collins had anticipated writing a third book in the series, also to be filmed and starring Joan. However, this never came to pass; instead she went on to write the first of her Santangelo mafia-themed novels, 1981's Chances.
- Gerry O'Hara was hired as director on the condition the budget did not exceed that of The Stud.

== Soundtrack ==
Much in the vein of Saturday Night Fever, the film features a disco soundtrack. The theme song to the film performed by Olympic Runners became a UK Top 40 hit single in August 1979, while the soundtrack album itself peaked at peaked at #39 in November. Released on Warwick Records, the album contained twenty songs that were featured in the film. Although some of these were existing hits, several were written especially for the film, including the Olympic Runners' title track, "Pour Your Little Heart Out" by The Drifters, "Dancing On The Edge Of A Heartache" by The Hunters, "I Feel Lucky Tonight" by Linda Lewis and The Stylistics, "Music You Are" by George Chandler, and "Standing In The Shadows Of Love" by Deborah Washington. The film score was written by Biddu, with lyrics by Don Black.

Tracks included:

- Olympic Runners – "The Bitch"
- The Drifters – "Pour Your Little Heart Out"
- The Stylistics & Linda Lewis – "I Feel Lucky Tonight"
- The Hunters – "Dancing on the Edge of a Heartache"
- The Stylistics – "Just Like We Never Said Goodbye"
- Herbie Hancock – "I Thought It Was You"
- The Players Association – "Turn the Music Up"
- Gonzalez – "Haven't Stopped Dancing Yet"
- Blondie – "Denis"
- Deborah Washington – "Standing in the Shadows of Love"
- The Gibson Brothers – "Cuba"
- The Three Degrees – "Giving Up, Giving In"
- The Real Thing – "Can You Feel the Force?"
- Len Boone – "There's No Me Without You"
- Quantum Jump – "The Lone Ranger"
- Inner Circle – "Everything Is Great"
- The Dooleys – "Love of My Life"
- George Chandler – "Music, You Are"
- Leo Sayer – "You Make Me Feel Like Dancing"

== Release ==
The Bitch had its premiere at the Rialto cinema in Leicester Square in London on 19 September 1979. It opened to the public the following day and finished second at the London box office behind Alien, grossing £30,723 from five cinemas in its first week. It also opened on 70 other screens in the London area. It was one of the most popular films of 1979 at the British box office.

== Reception ==
Writing in The Observer, film critic Philip French stated "The Bitch completes Jackie Collins' trilogy of contes moraux which pursue a seemingly inexorable course, not to say intercourse. The Stud was rock bottom, The World is Full of Married Men plumbed subterranean depths; The Bitch is a China Syndrome of a movie, melting downwards towards the soft core of the globe. Once again, Joan Collins plays the lewd disco owner Fontaine Khaled, the girl with a ticket to writhe. Here, she's hanging onto her club "The Hobo" and involved with an Italian stud (Michael Coby) who is smuggling gems for the mafia. As becomes denizens of the fantasy world that Steven Marcus dubbed "Pornotopia", everyone is talking about, preparing for, or engaged in sex, virtually all the time. The effect is woefully detumescent."

Writing in The Guardian, Hugh Hebert stated "In The Bitch, the elements of pop high life and heavy panting are brought together in even more ludicrous combination by the Collins sisters, Jackie the novelist and Joan the actress. The director, Gerry O'Hara, is presumably in there somewhere. In this latest forago, Joan is the owner of a once fashionable disco, now on the skids, looking for fresh finance and finding only the predictable con-man, on the run from the Mob. Who says there's no justice?"

The Monthly Film Bulletin wrote: "Appropriately enough for a film whose sole rationale seems to be its chic, consumerist decoration (and of course its disco soundtrack), The Bitch ruthlessly pares away any other elements of interest. A two-minute advertising film would have achieved the same end, of course, and would have been much less muddled in its plot. "

Although both The Stud and The Bitch were generally panned by critics and viewed as being little more than softcore porn, they were nevertheless both commercial successes and helped to revive Joan Collins' flagging career. Her performances as the insatiable "rich bitch" Fontaine Khaled later attracted the attention of Aaron Spelling and Esther and Richard Shapiro when they were looking for an actress to play the part of Alexis Carrington in their TV series Dynasty.

Due to its erotic adult content, the film was banned from local cinema screens by Tameside Council (near Manchester in England) at the time of its release.
