= George Alfred Walker =

British businessman

- Born: 14 April 1929; London, England
- Died: 22 March 2011 (aged 81)
- Occupation: Businessman
- Known for: Founder of Brent Walker
- Spouse: Jean Maureen Hatton (m. 1957)
- Children: 3

George Alfred Walker (14 April 1929 – 22 March 2011) was a British businessman and founder of Brent Walker.

== Biography ==
Born in Stepney, London, Walker was the son of William James Walker, a brewery worker and drayman at Watneys brewery, and his wife Ellen Louisa Walker née Page.

Walker attended the Jubilee School in Bedford, leaving at 14 to work in an aircraft factory. He later worked as a salesman and a porter in Billingsgate Fish Market and did his National Service in the Royal Air Force.

A former prize-fighter, Walker was a keen amateur boxer, becoming British amateur heavyweight champion in 1951. He turned professional and fought 14 professional fights, winning 11 with eight knockouts. He was pitted unsuccessfully against Welsh champion Dennis Powell for the British light-heavyweight title relinquished by Randolph Turpin.

Walker then drifted into crime, working for East End gangster Billy Hill, and eventually being convicted for theft and serving two and a half years in Wormwood Scrubs.

On release, he became the owner of a motor garage and manager for his brother Billy Walker, a professional heavyweight boxer. The brothers launched London's first discotheque Dolly's, in Jermyn Street, and a set up a business called G and W Walker Catering and Leisure Group, which consisted of chain of cafes, and Billy's Baked Potato.

In September 1973, George Walker completed a reverse takeover of Hackney & Hendon Greyhounds Ltd. This meant his private company bought a public company and the new merger resulted in a new company called Brent Walker, the property and leisure empire. The company developed the Brent Cross Shopping Centre (the UK's first stand-alone shopping centre) on the site of Hendon Greyhound Stadium with Walker selling his equity in Brent Cross in 1979, netting £3.7 million in profit. Hackney Wick Stadium remained under the control of Brent Walker until 1991 when the bank took control of it.

Brent Walker had a turbulent career through the 1980s, being worth about 250 million pounds at its zenith, but eventually collapsing in 1990 after taking over William Hill Bookmakers in a leveraged buy out. Walker was accused of fraud after an investigation by the Serious Fraud Office, but was cleared of all charges after a lengthy trial in 1995. He was however made bankrupt and moved to Russia, where he ran a series of businesses selling cigarettes and perfume and later opening a chain of betting shops.

== Marriage and children ==
Walker was married in 1957 to Jean Maureen Hatton (b. 1936), of West Ham, who he had known since he was 16 years old. She is the daughter of George (Georgie) James Hatton, a professional gambler and garage owner in Plaistow, and wife Lilian Elizabeth Hatton née Attreed.

Walker had two daughters and a son. Their elder daughter, Sarah, was married from 1989 to 1996 to the Marquess of Milford Haven, and is now married to Baron Spencer of Alresford. Their younger daughter, Romla, is an actress who appeared in Eastenders as Claudia Fielding in 1999.
