= The Stud (film) =

1978 British film by Quentin Masters

- British film poster
- Directed by: Quentin Masters
- Screenplay by: Jackie Collins
- Additional material and dialogue by: Dave Humphries Christopher Stagg
- Based on: The Stud by Jackie Collins
- Produced by: Ron Kass
- Starring: Joan Collins; Oliver Tobias; Sue Lloyd; Mark Burns; Doug Fisher; Walter Gotell; Tony Allyn; Emma Jacobs
- Cinematography: Peter Hannan
- Edited by: David Campling
- Music by: Biddu
- Production companies: Brent Walker Film Productions; Artoc Corporate Services; Stud Film Productions
- Distributed by: Brent Walker Film Distributors
- Release dates: 30 April 1978 (UK); 28 September 1979 (US)
- Running time: 95 minutes
- Country: United Kingdom
- Language: English
- Budget: $1.2 million or £350,000 or £550,000
- Box office: $20 million

The Stud is a 1978 British drama film directed by Quentin Masters and starring Joan Collins and Oliver Tobias. It is based on the 1969 novel of the same name by Collins' younger sister Jackie Collins.

== Plot ==
Fontaine Khaled is the London wife of a wealthy Arab businessman. She spends his money on her nightclub, Hobo, and her hedonistic partying lifestyle. She hires a handsome manager, Tony, to run the nightclub, but it is understood that his job security is dependent on his satisfying her nymphomaniac demands. When he meets her young stepdaughter Alexandra Khaled, Tony starts an affair and falls in love with her, and loses interest in Fontaine, having become disillusioned by her dissolute lifestyle. However, Alexandra discovers a video tape of Fontaine and Tony having sex in the Khaleds' private elevator, cheating on her father, and she rejects him and uses him to get back at Fontaine. Fontaine is divorced by her husband for adultery, and she fires Tony from his job.

== Cast ==
- Joan Collins as Fontaine Khaled
- Oliver Tobias as Tony Blake
- Sue Lloyd as Vanessa Grant
- Walter Gotell as Benjamin Khaled
- Mark Burns as Leonard Grant
- Doug Fisher as Sammy
- Emma Jacobs as Alex Khaled
- Tony Allyn as Hal
- Peter Lukas as Ian Thane
- Natalie Ogle as Maddy
- Jean Gilpin as Nika
- Constantin De Goguel as Lord Newton
- Guy Ward as Peter
- Sarah Lawson as Anne Khaled
- Jeremy Child as Lawyer
- Peter Dennis as Marc
- Chris Jagger as Rock star
- Peter Bourke as Gordon
- Tania Rogers as Janine
- Felicity Buirski as Deborah
- Minah Bird as Molly
- Sharon Fussey as Denise
- Hilda Fenemore as Mrs Blake
- Bernard Stone as Mr Blake
- John Conteh as himself
- Milo Sperber as Kamara (uncredited)
- Suzanne Danielle as Disco dancer (uncredited)
- Susie Silvey as Girl in shower (uncredited)

Additional footage involving disco dancing was added for the US release. This footage involved members of the UK dance troupe Legs & Co., appearing (uncredited) as discotheque patrons.

== Production notes ==
Joan Collins had asked her sister Jackie for the film rights for free and Jackie agreed whilst contributing to the screenplay. Joan met George Alfred Walker, who established Brent Walker, at the Cannes Film Festival in 1977 while promoting Empire of the Ants. He became excited by the project as it was proposed as a British alternative to Saturday Night Fever.

Both Joan Collins' husband, Ron Kass, and Jackie Collins' husband, Oscar Lerman, also acted as producers on the project.

David Essex turned down the role played by Oliver Tobias.

Filming started in November 1977. The nightclub scenes were shot at Tramp, a nightclub run by Jackie Collins' husband Oscar Lerman.

Joan Collins said she and Sue Lloyd were drunk during the orgy scene.

The marketing budget was the same as the budget to make the film.

In the 1980s, Joan Collins brought a multi-million pound legal action against Brent-Walker Productions Ltd. (who arranged finance and distribution for the film) at London's High Court, due to discrepancies with royalties. Collins alleged fraud, conspiracy, and breach of contract, after royalty payments stopped being sent regularly from 1980 onwards and without details. In February 1986, Collins accepted £147,233 as an interim settlement in the matter before the court case concluded, on the condition that independent accountants were hired to determine the true extent of the film's financial success and how much she and her partners were owed (her partners were named as former husband Ron Kass, and sister Jackie Collins). Brent-Walker agreed to this on the condition that Collins drop the allegations of fraud and conspiracy from her case, and that the accountants' fee would not exceed £40,000.

== Soundtrack ==
A successful soundtrack album was released on Ronco Records to tie-in with the film. The album contained twenty tracks, including original material penned by Biddu specifically for the film, as well as a number of major British chart hits which were licensed for use in the film. The majority of the tracks were disco flavoured, although some non-disco tracks were also included. The album rose to number 2 on the UK albums chart, kept off the top spot by the Saturday Night Fever soundtrack album.

Soundtrack album track list:

Side one

1. The Biddu Orchestra – "The Stud"
2. Michael Zager Band – "Let's All Chant"
3. Samantha Sang – "Emotion"
4. The Real Thing – "Let's Go Disco"
5. Baccara – "Sorry, I'm a Lady"
6. Rod Stewart – "You Wear It Well"
7. Odyssey – "Native New Yorker"
8. K.C. and the Sunshine Band – "That's the Way (I Like It)"
9. Linda Lewis – "It's Good"
10. Space – "Deliverance"

Side two

1. Leo Sayer – "Moonlighting"
2. Tina Charles – "Fire Down Below"
3. Manfred Mann's Earth Band – "Davy's on the Road Again"
4. 10cc – "I'm Not in Love"
5. Rose Royce – "Car Wash"
6. David Soul – "Silver Lady"
7. Goldie – "Making Up Again"
8. Patti Smith Group – "Because The Night"
9. Bill Fredericks – "Almost"
10. Heatwave – The Groove Line"

== Release ==
=== Box office ===
The film grossed over $20,000,000 internationally. The film was one of the most popular movies of 1978 at the British box office.

Released in March 1978 the film made back its cost by June. Brent Walker claimed that within ten days the film earned £550,000 at the British box office. It also claimed the soundtrack had sold £640,000 worth of albums and Stud cosmetic merchandising brought in £100,000. By May 1978 it was reported The Stud had earned £1 million at the British box office. By May 1979 it was reported the film had earned $2.5 million in the UK and an equivalent amount around the world.

The movie did not perform well in the United States, which Brent Walker blamed on American International Pictures' handling of the film, including the "slapdash dubbing" of the British lead actors' voices.

=== Legacy ===
The film helped to revitalise Joan Collins's career. The Stud and its sequel The Bitch helped her to be cast as Alexis Colby in Dynasty. However, Tobias later claimed that his part in the film led to typecasting and ruined his career.

== Bibliography ==
- Simon Sheridan Keeping the British End Up: Four Decades of Saucy Cinema, Titan Books (fourth edition, 2011)
