= Gary Hurlstone =

English footballer

Personal information
- Full name: Gary Hurlstone
- Date of birth: 25 April 1963 (age 63)
- Place of birth: Mexborough, West Riding of Yorkshire, England
- Height: 5 ft 8 in (1.73 m)
- Position: Striker

Senior career*
Years	Team	Apps	(Gls)
- Gainsborough Trinity
- Worksop Town
- Mexborough Town
1988–1989	Hatfield Main		
1989	York City	2	(0)
1989–	Bridlington Town		
- Goole Town
- Gainsborough Trinity
- Bishop Auckland
1993–1994	Buxton		
1994–1996	Hatfield Main		
1996–	Stocksbridge Park Steels		
Total		2	(0)
- * Club domestic league appearances and goals

Gary Hurlstone (born 25 April 1963) is an English former professional footballer who played as a striker in the Football League for York City, and in non-League football for Gainsborough Trinity, Worksop Town, Mexborough Town, Hatfield Main, Bridlington Town, Goole Town, Bishop Auckland, Buxton and Stocksbridge Park Steels.
