= Robin Hurlstone =

British actor and art dealer (1958–2026)

- Born: Robin Alastair Hurlstone; 19 March 1958; Marylebone, London, England
- Died: 25 May 2026 (aged 68); London, England
- Partner: Joan Collins (1988–2001)

Robin Alastair Hurlstone (19 March 1958 – 25 May 2026) was a British actor and art dealer who is best known for portraying the farmer Walter Boggis in the 2009 film Fantastic Mr. Fox.

Hurlstone was romantically involved with actress Joan Collins. He and Collins resided together from 1988 to 2001. In her memoir, Collins revealed that she and Hurlstone had a tumultuous, dramatic, and passionate relationship over the course of their 13 years together.

Hurlstone died in London on 25 May 2026, aged 68.
