= Joan Collins =

English actress and writer (born 1933)

Dame Joan Collins DBE
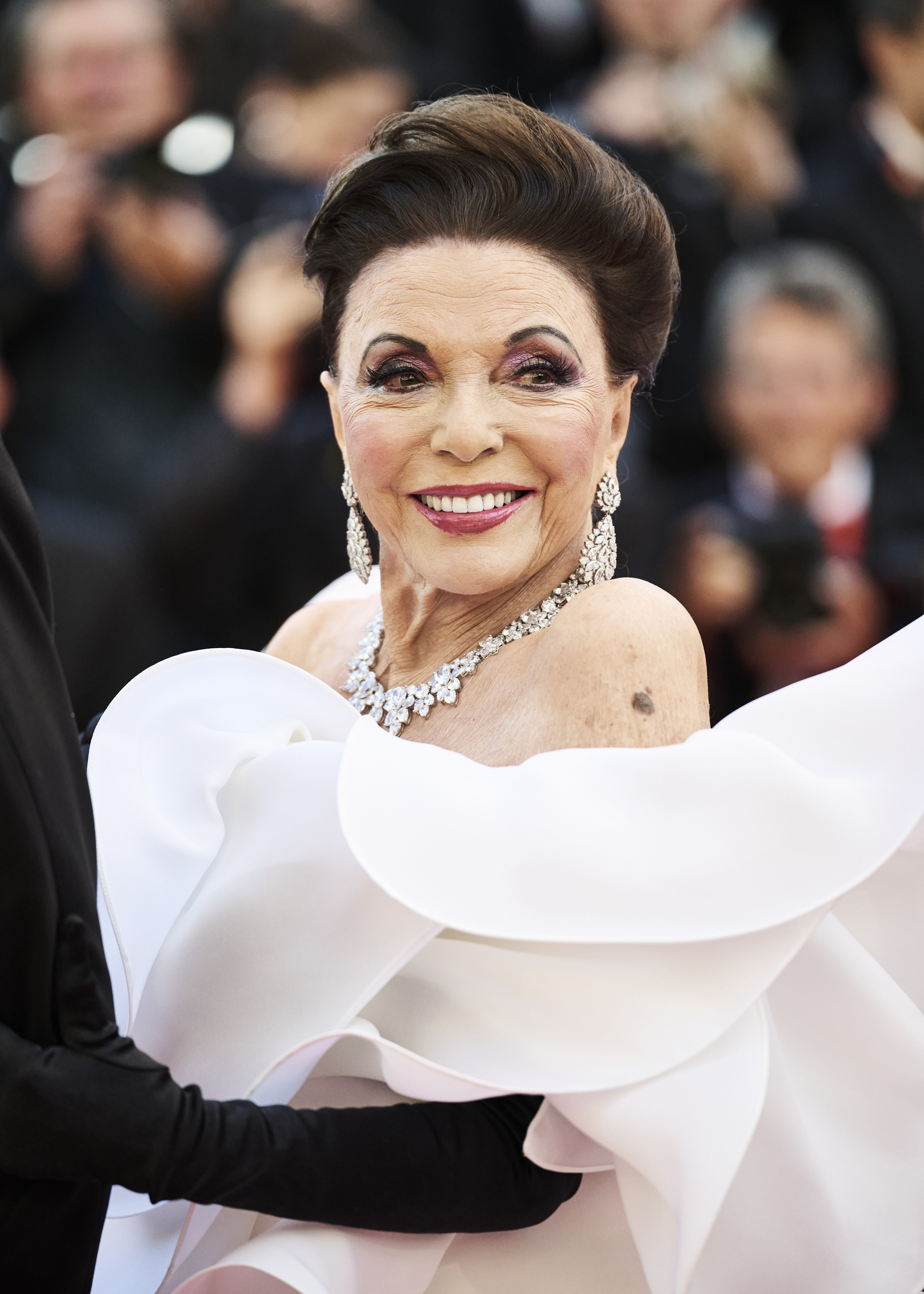
- Collins in 2026
- Born: Joan Henrietta Collins; 23 May 1933 (age 93); London, England
- Occupations: Actress; author; columnist
- Years active: 1951–present
- Spouses: Maxwell Reed (m. 1952; div. 1956); Anthony Newley (m. 1963; div. 1971); Ron Kass (m. 1972; div. 1983); Peter Holm (m. 1985; div. 1987); Percy Gibson (m. 2002)
- Partner: Robin Hurlstone (1988–2001)
- Children: 3, including Tara and Alexander
- Relatives: Jackie Collins (sister)
- Website: joancollins.com

Dame Joan Henrietta Collins (born 23 May 1933) is an English actress, author and columnist. She is the recipient of several accolades, including a Golden Globe Award, a People's Choice Award, a Photoplay Award, two Soap Opera Digest Awards and a Primetime Emmy Award nomination. In 1983, Collins was awarded a star on the Hollywood Walk of Fame. She has been recognised for her philanthropy, particularly her advocacy towards causes relating to children, which has earned her many honours. In 2015, she was made a Dame by Queen Elizabeth II for her charitable services, presented to her by Charles, then Prince of Wales.

Collins trained as an actress at the Royal Academy of Dramatic Art. She signed to The Rank Organisation at the age of 17 and had small roles in the British films Lady Godiva Rides Again (1951) and The Woman's Angle (1952) before taking on a supporting role in Judgment Deferred (1952). She went under contract to 20th Century Fox in 1955, and in that same year she starred as Evelyn Nesbit in The Girl in the Red Velvet Swing, Elizabeth Raleigh in The Virgin Queen and Princess Nellifer in Land of the Pharaohs, the latter garnering a cult following. Collins continued to take on film roles throughout the late 1950s, appearing in The Opposite Sex (1956), Sea Wife (1957), and The Wayward Bus (1957). After starring in the epic film Esther and the King (1960), she was, upon request, released from her contract with 20th Century Fox.

Collins appeared only in a few film roles in the 1960s, notably starring in Seven Thieves (1960), The Road to Hong Kong (1962), Warning Shot (1967), Subterfuge (1968), and also appeared in an episode of Star Trek (1967). She began to take on local roles again back in Britain in the 1970s, appearing in the films Revenge, Quest for Love (both 1971), Tales from the Crypt, Fear in the Night (both 1972), Tales That Witness Madness (1973) and Dark Places (1974) as well as Empire of the Ants (1977), which earned her a Saturn Award nomination. Collins was criticially acclaimed for her starring role in The Stud (1978) and its sequel The Bitch (1979).

From 1981 to 1989, Collins starred as Alexis Colby in the soap opera Dynasty, which made her an international superstar. It brought her critical acclaim, winning her the Golden Globe Award for Best Actress in a Television Series – Drama in 1982, and earning her a nomination for the Primetime Emmy Award for Outstanding Lead Actress in a Drama Series in 1984.

In the 1990s and 2000s, Collins took on more stage roles as well as regular parts on television. She took fewer film roles, most notably appearing in The Flintstones in Viva Rock Vegas (2000) and the TV movie These Old Broads (2001) alongside Elizabeth Taylor, Debbie Reynolds and Shirley MacLaine. In the 2010s, Collins took on recurring roles in the series Happily Divorced (2011–2013), The Royals (2014–2018), Benidorm (2014–2017) and American Horror Story: Apocalypse (2018). Her first starring film role since the 1980s was The Time of Their Lives (2017), and she has also appeared in various independent films, which includes the critically acclaimed Gerry (2018).

== Early life and education ==
Joan Henrietta Collins was born on 23 May 1933 in Paddington, London, and brought up in Maida Vale, the daughter of Elsa Collins (née Bessant), a dance teacher, and Joseph William Collins, a talent agent (whose clients would later include Shirley Bassey, the Beatles and Tom Jones). Her father, a native of South Africa, was Jewish, and her British mother was Anglican. She had two younger siblings, Jackie, a novelist, and Bill, a property agent.

Collins was educated at the Francis Holland School, an independent day school for girls in London. She made her stage debut in the Henrik Ibsen play A Doll's House at the age of nine, and at the age of 16 trained as an actress at the Royal Academy of Dramatic Art (RADA) in London. At the age of 17, Collins was signed to the Rank Organisation, a British film studio.

== Acting career ==
=== 1950s ===
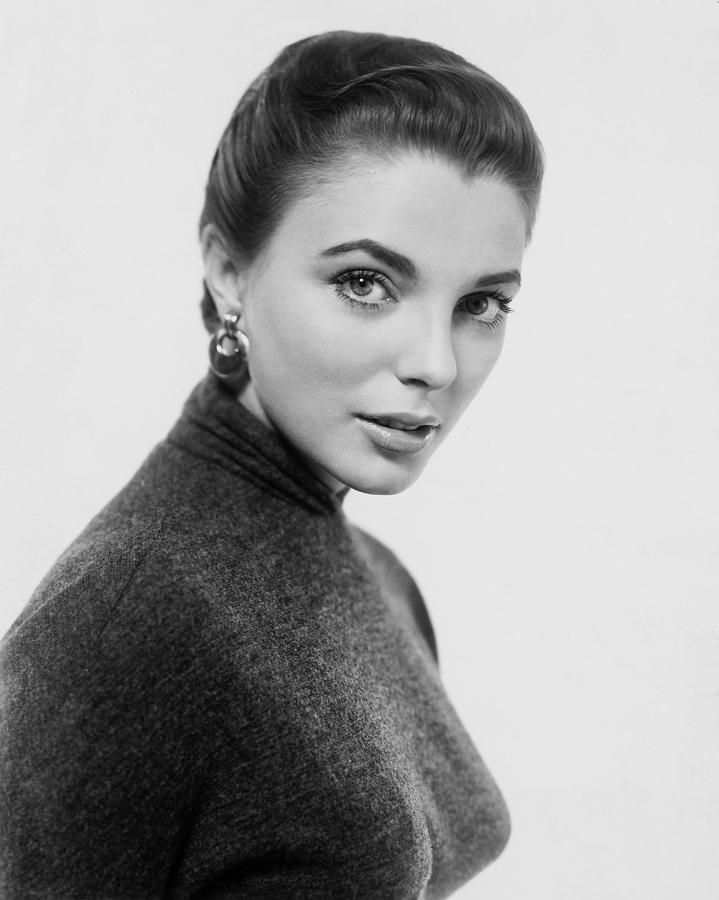
Collins in 1954

After signing with Rank, Collins made her film debut as an extra portraying a beauty contestant in Lady Godiva Rides Again (1951), which starred Diana Dors. Collins followed this with a small role as a Greek maid in The Woman's Angle (1952), before securing a more substantial part as a gangster’s moll in Judgment Deferred (1952). After these films were released, she appeared in The Seventh Veil at the Q Theatre in London in March 1952, went on to play the title role in Jassy in April, and later that year received top billing opposite Maxwell Reed in The Skin of Our Teeth.

With her dark hair and striking eyes, Collins projected a sultry, provocative image that led to frequent "bad girl" casting. She was nicknamed "England's Bad Girl" and described as "Britain's answer to Marilyn Monroe." Her breakthrough came with a prominent and widely publicized role as a juvenile delinquent in I Believe in You (1952). Her subsequent films whilst under contract to Rank included Decameron Nights (1953) with Joan Fontaine; England's first X certificate drama, Cosh Boy (1953), directed by Lewis Gilbert; Turn the Key Softly (1953), a drama about three women released from prison on the same day; and the boxing saga The Square Ring (1953). Collins was top-billed in the desert island comedy Our Girl Friday (1953), co-starring Kenneth More. She was directed again by Lewis Gilbert in The Good Die Young (1954) with Laurence Harvey and Gloria Grahame. Between film roles, she returned to the stage for the productions of The Praying Mantis (1954) and Claudia and David (1954) in London.

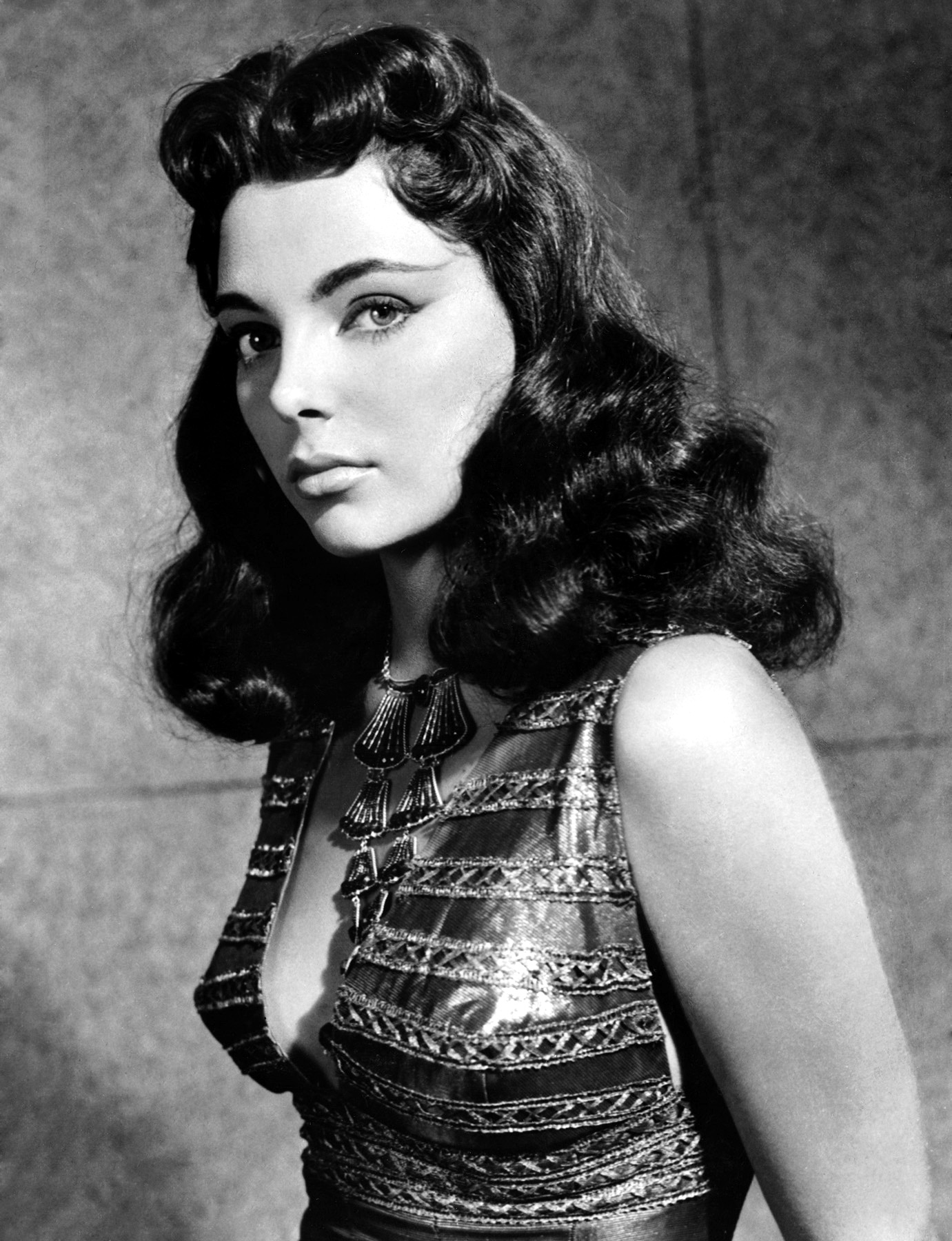
Collins in Land of the Pharaohs (1955)

In 1954, Collins was chosen by American director Howard Hawks to star as the scheming Princess Nellifer in her first international production, Land of the Pharaohs (1955). The lavish Warner Brothers historical epic was unsuccessful upon release, but has been lauded by Martin Scorsese and French critics supporting the auteur theory for numerous elements of its physical production. Danny Peary, in his book Cult Movies (1981), selected it as a cult classic. Collins's seductive performance so impressed 20th Century Fox chief Darryl Zanuck that he signed the young star to a seven-year contract with the Hollywood studio.

Collins made her Hollywood film debut in the lavish historical drama The Virgin Queen (1955). The British newcomer was given equal billing with established stars Bette Davis and Richard Todd. That same year, Collins was cast in the starring role of Evelyn Nesbit in The Girl in the Red Velvet Swing with Ray Milland and Farley Granger. The part had originally been intended for Marilyn Monroe; however, problems between Monroe and Fox led to Collins gaining the role.

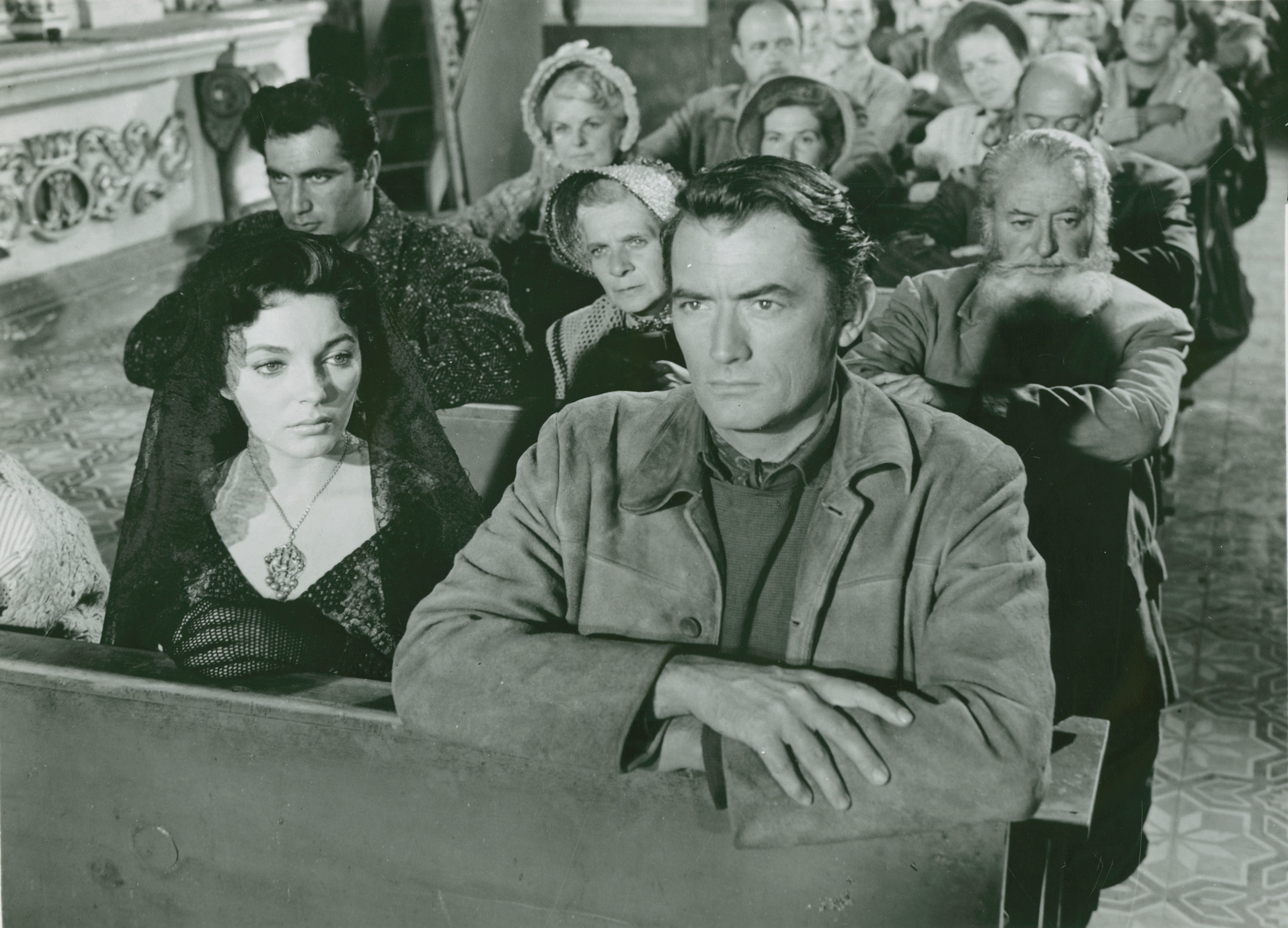
Collins and Gregory Peck in a scene from The Bravados (1958).

MGM borrowed Collins for The Opposite Sex (1956), a musical remake of The Women (1939) in which she was cast as the gold digging Crystal, the role played by Joan Crawford in the original. She then starred as a young nun in Sea Wife (1956), top-billed over co-star Richard Burton, followed by the all-star Island in the Sun (1957), which was a major box-office success. The film earned $5,550,000 worldwide, and finished as the sixth-highest-grossing film of 1957. In 1957, she was top-billed over Jayne Mansfield in the film version of John Steinbeck's The Wayward Bus, which despite disappointing reviews was nominated for the Golden Berlin Bear Award at the 7th Berlin International Film Festival. She then starred opposite Robert Wagner in the espionage thriller Stopover Tokyo (1957), and was Gregory Peck's leading lady in the Western drama The Bravados (1958). The Leo McCarey comedy Rally Round the Flag, Boys (1958) cast Collins as a temptress out to seduce Paul Newman away from Joanne Woodward. Next came the tense crime caper Seven Thieves (1960) opposite Edward G. Robinson and Rod Steiger.

=== 1960s ===
In 1960, Collins became increasingly disillusioned with 20th Century Fox when, having been the original choice to play the title role in Cleopatra, the part went instead to Elizabeth Taylor. Collins withdrew from the studio's production of Sons and Lovers, and requested a release from her contract, but agreed to star in one last film for Fox, top-billed again in the biblical epic Esther and the King (1960).

In 1961, she returned to London to star opposite Bing Crosby and Bob Hope in the last of that film duo's "road" pictures, The Road to Hong Kong (1962). Former "road" leading lady Dorothy Lamour was relegated to a guest appearance in the film. In Italy, Collins starred in Hard Time for Princes (1965); back in the US she played David Janssen's wife in the detective thriller Warning Shot (1967); in the UK she was the leading lady in the spy caper Subterfuge (1968); and made a cameo appearance in the comedy If It's Tuesday, This Must Be Belgium (1969).

In the US, Collins starred opposite then-husband Anthony Newley in his autobiographical musical Can Heironymus Merkin Ever Forget Mercy Humppe and Find True Happiness? (1969), a decision she later regretted. Then came the female lead in the Italian drama L'amore brave (1969), The Executioner (1970), a thriller with George Peppard, and Up in the Cellar (1970), a quasisequel to Three in the Attic. Although she had made several appearances on interview and game shows in the late 1950s and early 1960s, Collins began her television dramatic career with a guest role in The Human Jungle in 1963. Her notable appearances on American television during the 1960s included playing the villainous Siren in Batman, Run for Your Life, The Virginian, Mission: Impossible, The Man From U.N.C.L.E., and in Star Trek: The Original Series, she played Edith Keeler in the episode, "The City on the Edge of Forever" (1967), an episode noted by many critics and fans as the best Star Trek episode of the whole franchise

=== 1970s ===
In the 1970s, Collins remained busy on television. She starred in the TV movies The Man Who Came to Dinner (1972) with Orson Welles and Lee Remick, and Drive Hard, Drive Fast (1973) opposite Brian Kelly. Her many guest appearances during the decade included The Persuaders! alongside Roger Moore and Tony Curtis, Fallen Angels with Susannah York, Space 1999, Orson Welles Great Mysteries, Police Woman, The Moneychangers with Kirk Douglas and Christopher Plummer, Starsky & Hutch, Tattletales, Switch, Future Cop, Ellery Queen, The Fantastic Journey, Baretta and three separate episodes of Tales of the Unexpected. She rounded off the decade playing Cleopatra in an episode of Aaron Spelling's Fantasy Island.

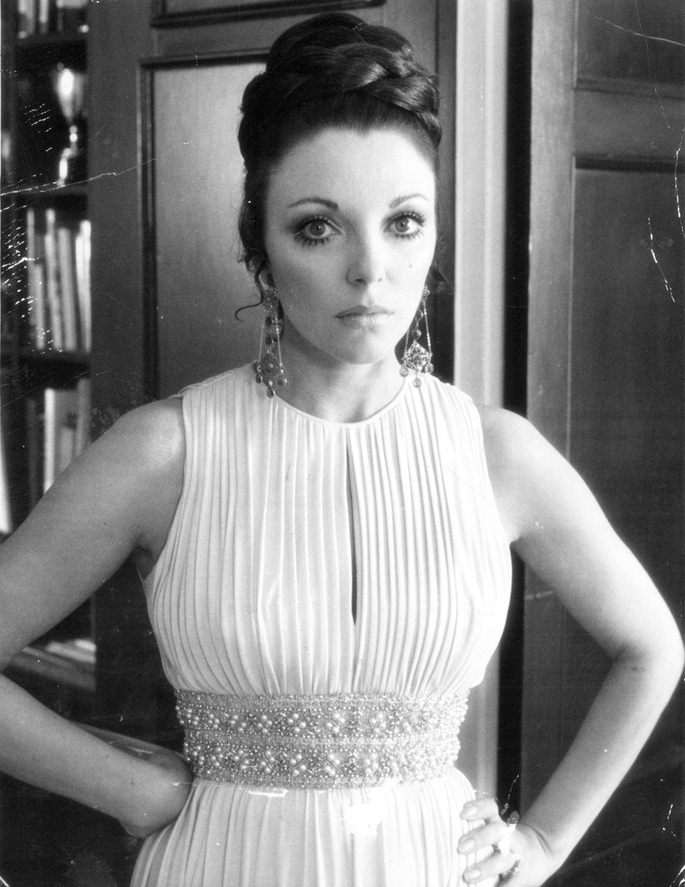
Collins in 1973

In 1970, Collins returned to Britain and starred in several films, mostly thrillers and horror films: Revenge (1971), as the vengeance-seeking mother of a murdered child; Quest for Love (1971), a romantic science-fiction piece; Tales from the Crypt (1972), a highly successful horror anthology; Fear in the Night (1972), a psychological horror from Jimmy Sangster; Dark Places (1973), a thriller with Christopher Lee; and Tales That Witness Madness (1973), another horror anthology. She went to Italy for the football-themed comedy L'arbitro (1974), to Spain for The Great Adventure opposite Jack Palance and returned to England for yet another horror, playing the mother of a murderous infant in I Don't Want to Be Born (1975).

After two comedies, Alfie Darling (1975) and The Bawdy Adventures of Tom Jones (1976), Collins returned to the US to make what she now refers to as the nadir of her film career, the giant insect science-fiction piece Empire of the Ants (1977). In Italy she was the leading lady in the thriller Fearless (1978); in the US made the lighthearted Zero to Sixty (1978); and back in the UK appeared with Robert Mitchum in The Big Sleep. From 1978 to 1983, Collins appeared in ten advertisements for Cinzano alongside Leonard Rossiter. Playing the same characters in each, Collins played the straight-laced Melissa and Rossiter her pretentious husband, the running joke was that Rossiter's character either spilt his drink over his wife, or accidentally caused her to spill it over herself. The advertisement campaign was hugely popular, and there were plans to make a film featuring the two characters, but this did not materialise.

In 1978, Collins was catapulted back to major stardom in the UK when she starred in the film version of her sister Jackie Collins's racy novel The Stud. It was made for $600,000 and went on to gross over $20,000,000 internationally. At the same time she published her autobiography, Past Imperfect, which went to number 1 in the bestseller charts. The Stud was so successful that a sequel, The Bitch (1979) was hastily arranged and was also a hit. After shooting Game for Vultures (1979) opposite Richard Harris and Sunburn (1979) with Farrah Fawcett, Collins returned to the stage for the first time in many years to play the title role in The Last of Mrs. Cheyney (1980) in London's West End.

=== 1980s ===
The success of The Stud and The Bitch helped Collins to be cast in the second season of the then-struggling soap opera Dynasty (1981–89), as Alexis Colby, the beautiful and vengeful ex-wife of oil tycoon Blake Carrington (John Forsythe). Dynasty became an enormous worldwide phenomenon, and by 1985 the program was the number-one show in the United States, beating out CBS rival Dallas, which ranked number two. For her portrayal of Alexis, Collins was nominated six times for a Golden Globe Award (every year from 1982 to 1987), winning in 1983, the same year she was nominated for an Emmy as Best Actress in a Drama Series. In accepting the award, Collins thanked Sophia Loren for turning down the part of Alexis.

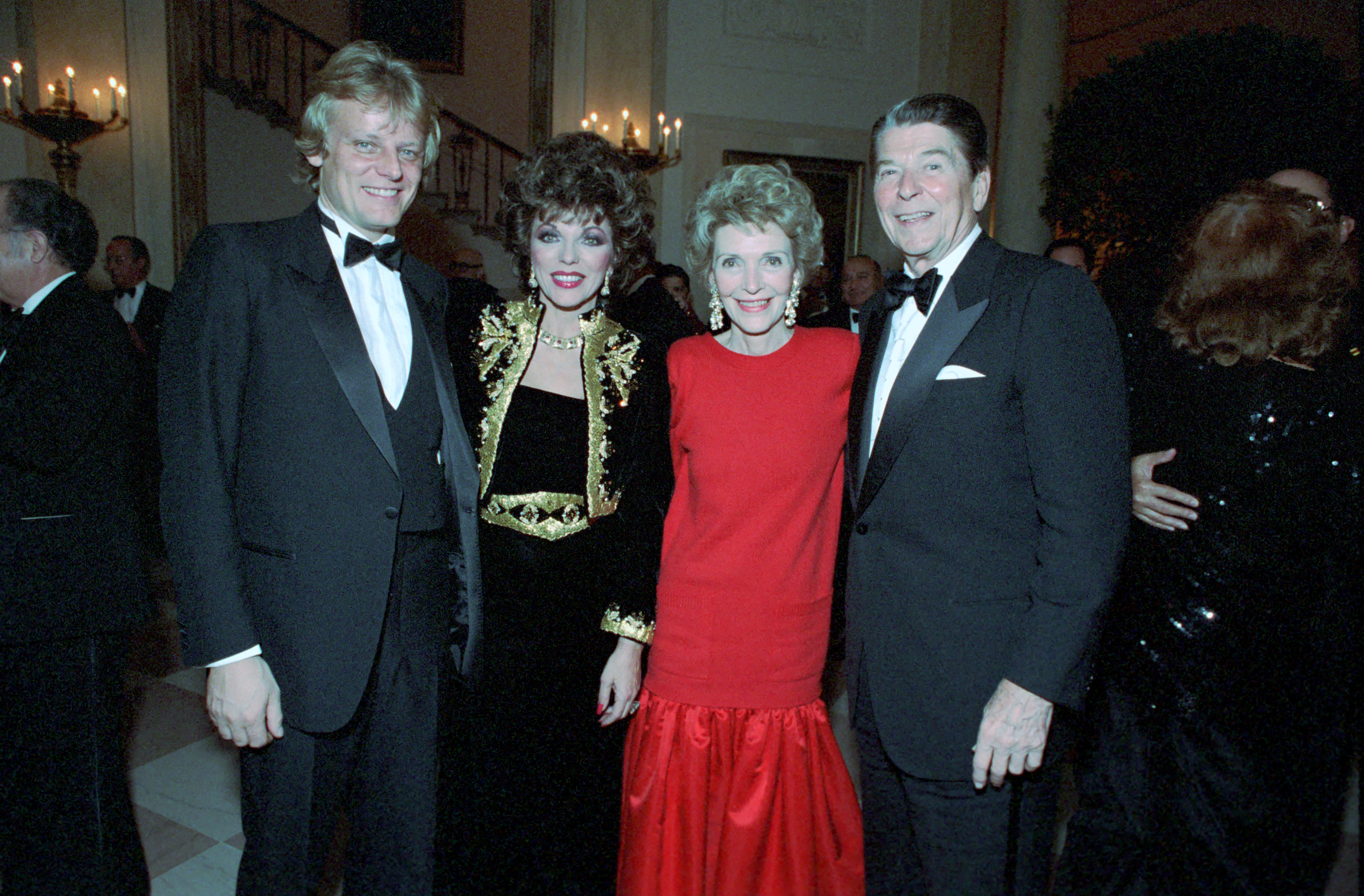
Collins with Peter Holm, Nancy Reagan and Ronald Reagan in 1984

Her performance is generally credited as the chief factor in the fledgling show's subsequent rise in the Nielsen ratings to a hit rivalling Dallas. Co-star Al Corley noted that Collins "just flew" in the role that was "tailor made... just spot on." In Dynasty producer Aaron Spelling's final press interview, he said of Collins: "We didn't write Joan Collins. She played Joan Collins. Am I right? We wrote a character, but the character could have been played by 50 people and 49 of them would have failed. She made it work." In recognition of her new status, in 1983 Collins was honoured with a star on the Hollywood Walk of Fame for career achievement.

Whilst filming Dynasty, Collins starred in the feature film Nutcracker (1982) (an attempt to repeat the success of The Stud and The Bitch) and the TV movies Paper Dolls (1982), The Wild Women of Chastity Gulch (1982), Making of a Male Model (1983) with Jon-Erik Hexum, Her Life as a Man (1984), and The Cartier Affair (1984) with David Hasselhoff. She made guest star appearances in The Love Boat and Faerie Tale Theatre, and co-hosted an ABC-TV special created for her, Blondes vs. Brunettes. At the age of 50, Collins appeared in a 12-page photo layout for Playboy magazine shot by George Hurrell. With Dynasty at the height of its success, Collins both produced and starred in the smash hit 1986 CBS miniseries Sins, and also in the same year, Monte Carlo.

=== 1990s ===
When Dynasty ended in 1989, Collins began rehearsals for her Broadway stage debut, as Amanda in a successful revival of Noël Coward's Private Lives (1990). She subsequently toured the US in the same play and also starred as Amanda in a production in London's West End. In 1991, she also starred for BBC Television in a series of eight individual Noël Coward plays under the title Tonight at 8.30. In 1991, Collins rejoined her co-stars for Dynasty: The Reunion, a miniseries that concluded the cliffhanger ending left after the show's abrupt 1989 cancellation. In the 1990s, Collins continued to star in films including Decadence (1994) and In The Bleak Midwinter (1995).

On American television she made the TV movies Hart to Hart – Two Harts in 3/4 Time (1995), Annie: A Royal Adventure! (1995) and Sweet Deception (1998). She also made guest-star appearances on series such as Roseanne (1993), The Nanny (1996) and Will & Grace (2000), and played a recurring role in seven episodes of Pacific Palisades (1997). She was selected as the cover star for the relaunch of the popular celebrity magazine OK! when it changed from a monthly to a weekly. In 1999, Collins was cast in the film version of the musical theatre show Joseph and the Amazing Technicolor Dreamcoat, with Donny Osmond. She then starred opposite Nigel Hawthorne in the film The Clandestine Marriage (1999), which she also co-produced.

=== 2000s ===
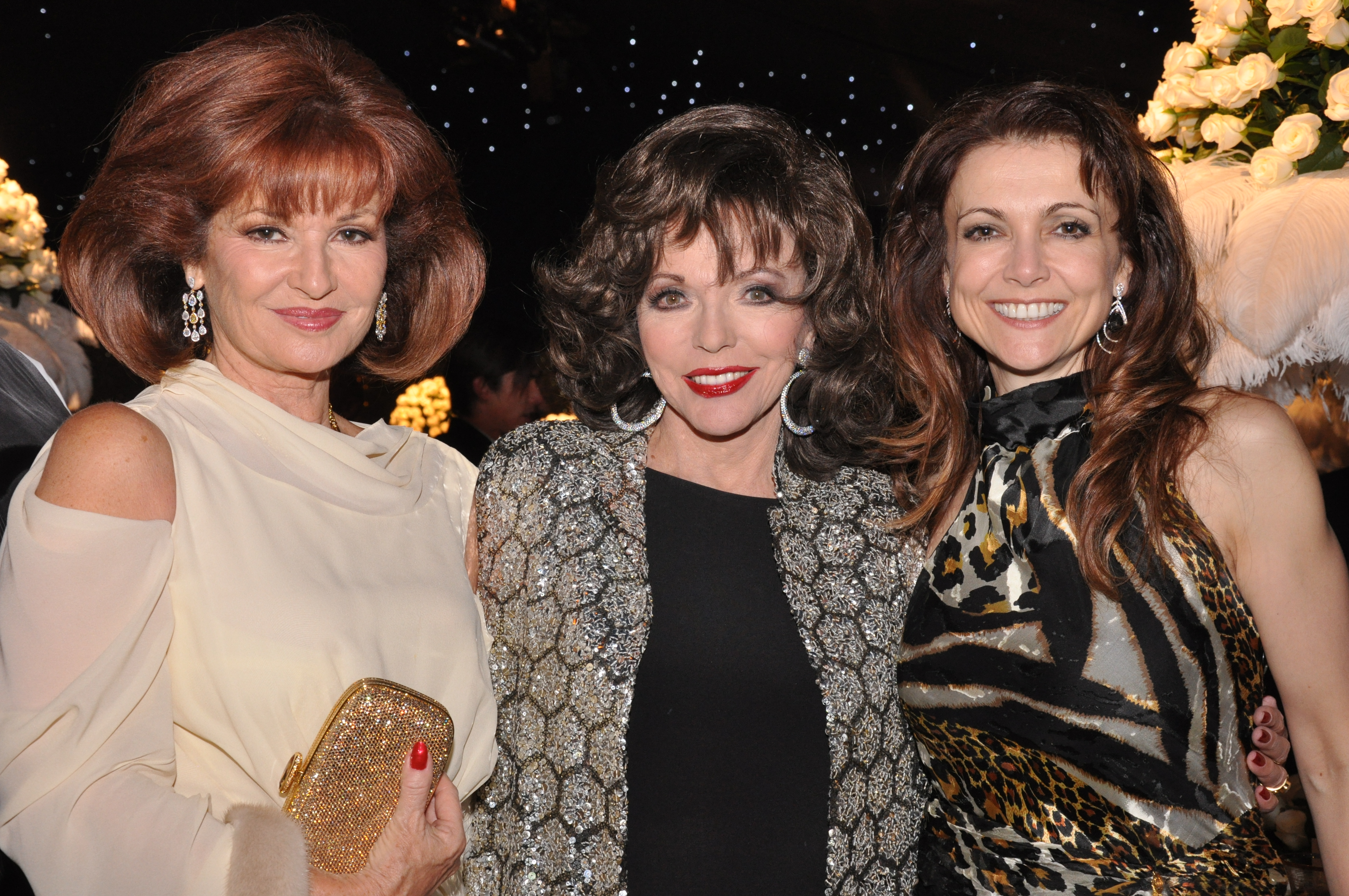
With Dynasty co-stars Stephanie Beacham and Emma Samms in 2009

In 2000, Collins replaced Elizabeth Taylor as Pearl Slaghoople, Wilma Flintstone's mother, in The Flintstones in Viva Rock Vegas, a prequel to the Universal Studios live-action film The Flintstones (1994, Taylor had originated the role in the first film). The following year, Collins co-starred with Taylor, Shirley MacLaine and Debbie Reynolds in the television film These Old Broads, written by Reynolds' daughter Carrie Fisher. In 2002, Collins returned to soap operas in a limited guest run on the American daytime soap Guiding Light. In 2005, actress Alice Krige impersonated Collins in Dynasty: The Making of a Guilty Pleasure, a fictionalised television film based on the creation and behind-the-scenes production of Dynasty.

In 2006, Collins toured the United Kingdom in An Evening with Joan Collins (US title One Night With Joan), a one-woman show in which she related the highs and lows of her career and life. The show was directed by her husband Percy Gibson, whom she married in 2002. She has continued to tour the world with the show and its sequel Joan Collins Unscripted ever since, including appearances in New York, Las Vegas, Dubai, Sydney, and twice at the London Palladium. In 2006–2007 she also toured North America for 30 weeks in the play Legends! with former Dynasty co-star Linda Evans.

In the mid-2000s, Collins's television work included the hit British television series Footballer's Wives as Eva de Wolffe (2005), the BBC series Hotel Babylon (2006) and Dynasty Reunion: Catfights and Caviar, a 2006 special featuring several of her Dynasty co-stars reminiscing about the original series. Collins guest-starred in They Do It with Mirrors, a two-hour episode of the murder-mystery drama Marple in 2009, as Ruth Van Rydock, a friend of detective Miss Jane Marple. In 2009, Collins presented her own reality television series entitled Joan Collins Does Glamour.

=== 2010s ===
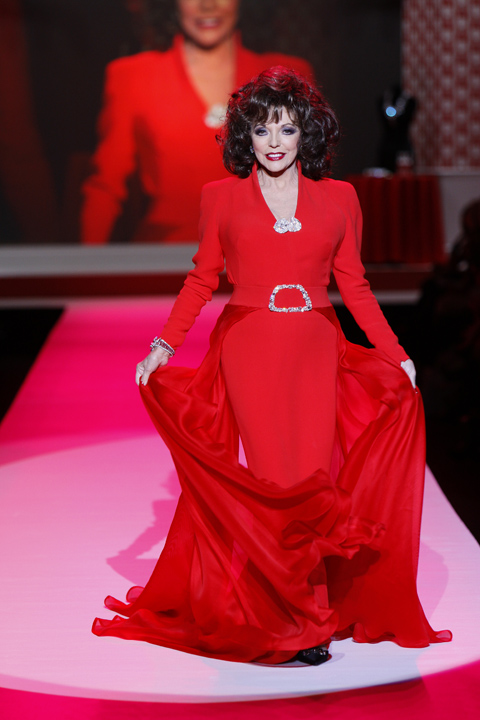
Collins at The Heart Truth's Red Dress Collection Fashion Show in 2010

In 2010 she joined the cast of the German soap opera Verbotene Liebe (Forbidden Love) for a short run, playing an aristocratic British woman, Lady Joan, who takes a young German prince in tow. In 2012 she starred in a Europe-wide commercial for Snickers chocolate bars, alongside Stephanie Beacham.

She made her first (and, to date, only) venture into pantomime as Queen Rat in Dick Whittington at the Birmingham Hippodrome during the 2010 Christmas season, starring alongside Nigel Havers and Julian Clary. In 2012–2013, she appeared as herself in the US sitcom Happily Divorced. She also lent her voice to the animated feature film Saving Santa (2013).

From 2013 to 2017, Collins had a recurring guest role in the British sitcom Benidorm as Crystal Hennessy-Vass, the fierce CEO of the fictional Solana Hotel Group. From 2014 to 2018, she played the Grand Duchess of Oxford, mother of fictional British Queen Helena (Elizabeth Hurley) in the E! drama series The Royals. In 2015, Collins backed the children's fairytales app GivingTales in aid of UNICEF, together with others such as Roger Moore, Ewan McGregor, Stephen Fry, Joanna Lumley, and Michael Caine. The same year she starred in the fantasy film Molly Moon and the Incredible Book of Hypnotism.

In 2016, Collins made a cameo appearance as herself in Absolutely Fabulous: The Movie. The following year she returned to the big screen with the starring role in the British comedy-drama The Time of Their Lives, playing a faded Hollywood star. In 2018 she appeared in a critically acclaimed short film, Gerry, for which she won the Best Actress award at the LA Shorts International Film Festival.

In 2018, Collins joined the cast of Ryan Murphy's series American Horror Story for its eighth season American Horror Story: Apocalypse. She first portrayed Evie Gallant, the glamorous and rich grandmother of Evan Peters' character, and later portrayed witch actress Bubbles McGee. In 2019 she guest-starred in an episode of the new Hawaii Five-O TV-series.

=== 2020s ===
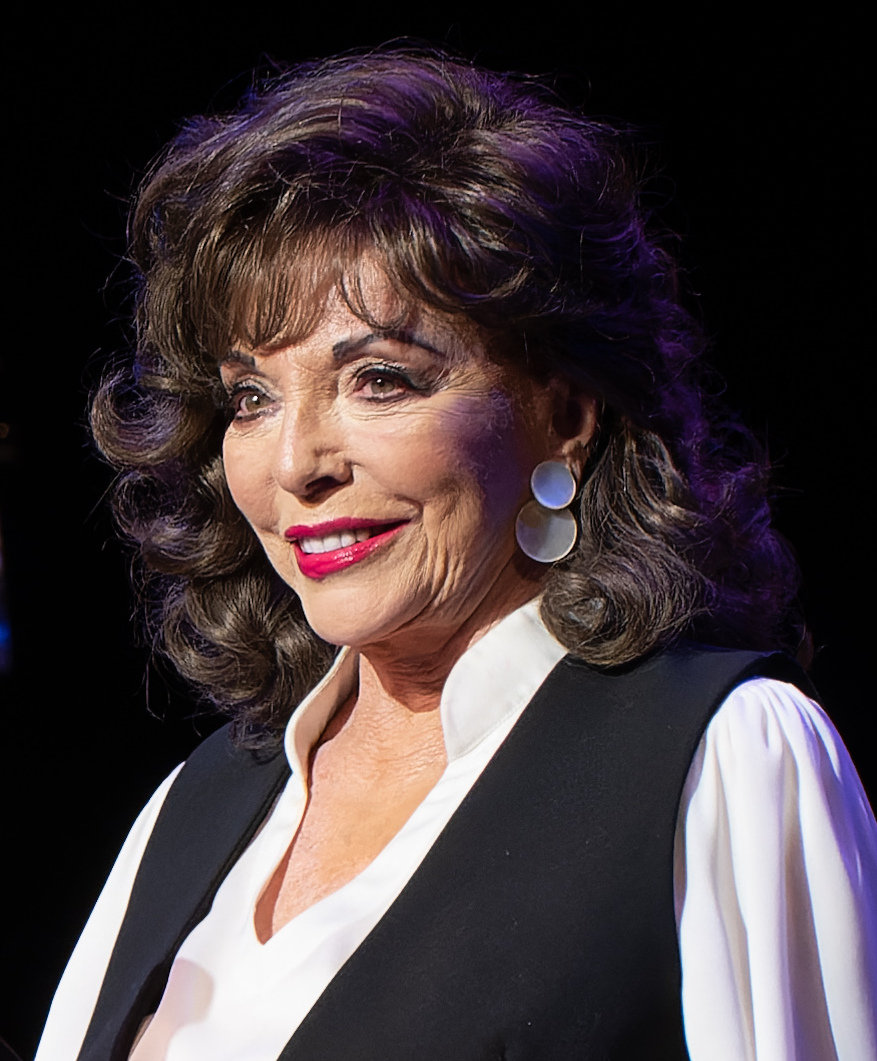
Collins in 2023

Collins had a co-starring role in the 2020 film The Loss Adjuster opposite Luke Goss and Martin Kemp. In 2021, Collins appeared in a short comedy spoof for Comic Relief entitled 2020: The Movie, in which she played Maggie Keenan, the first person to receive a COVID-19 vaccination. Collins starred as Adelaide of Maurienne in the historical drama miniseries Glow and Darkness (2021), alongside Jane Seymour and Denise Richards. She is the subject of the feature-length TCM documentary This Is Joan Collins (2022), in which she narrates her own life story. Collins had a role in the 2022 musical Tomorrow Morning, based on the acclaimed musical play of the same name. In June 2022, Collins took part in the Platinum Jubilee Pageant as part of Queen Elizabeth II's Platinum Jubilee and travelled down The Mall in an convertible vintage Jaguar.

In July 2025, Collins partnered with Marks and Spencer to launch the "Joan Collins Bouquet". In December 2025, Collins won the Lifetime Achievement Award at the Women in Film and Television International Awards. In January 2026, Collins starred in the mystery film A Murder Between Friends. Collins also served as a producer on the movie. In June 2026, Collins was presented with the Power of Women Icon of the Year Award at Variety’s Power of Women London Awards.

She is set to portray Wallis Simpson in a movie under the working title My Duchess. Filming on the movie began in May 2025, taking place in London and Paris, and it is set to be released later in 2026.

== Other ventures ==
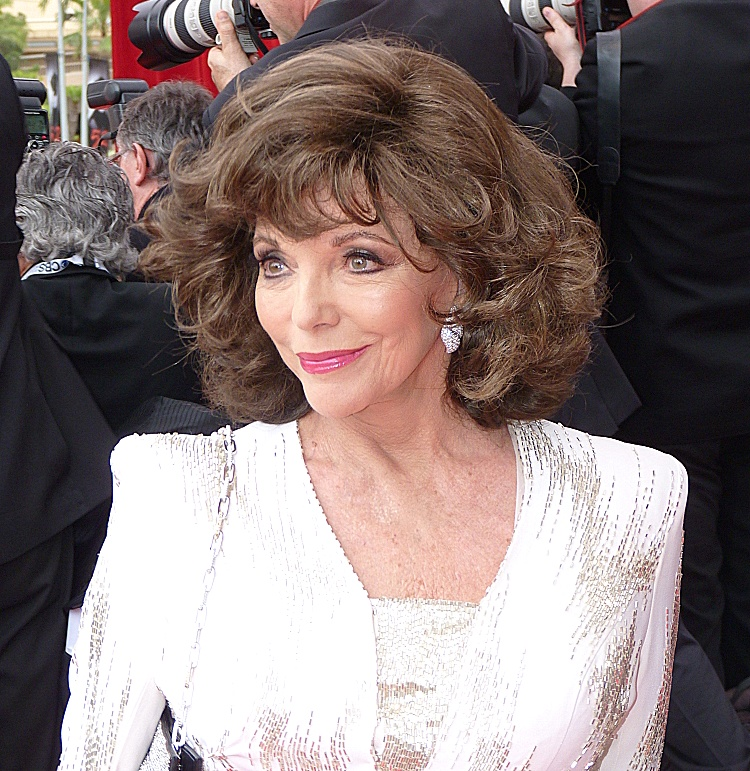
At the 2012 Monte Carlo Television Festival

=== Philanthropy ===
Collins has publicly supported several charities for several decades. In 1982, Collins spoke before the U.S. Congress about increasing funding for neurological research. In 1983, she was named a patron of the International Foundation for Children with Learning Disabilities, earning the foundation's highest honour in 1988 for her continuing support. Additionally, 1988 also saw the opening of the Joan Collins Wing of the Children's Hospital of Michigan in Detroit. In 1990, she was made an honorary founding member of the National Society for the Prevention of Cruelty to Children.

In 1994, Collins was awarded the lifetime achievement award from the Association of Breast Cancer Studies in Great Britain for her contribution to breast cancer awareness in the UK. Collins is patron of Fight for Sight; in 2003, she became a patron of the Shooting Star Chase Children's Hospice in Great Britain, while continuing to support several foster children in India, something she has done for the past 35 years. Collins serves her former school, the Royal Academy of Dramatic Art, as the Honorary President of the RADA Associates.

=== Writing ===
Since the late 1990s, Collins has been a regular guest diarist for The Spectator. In 2008, she had a weekly opinions column in The Sunday Telegraph. She continues to write occasionally for the Daily Mail, The Times, The Daily Telegraph and The Lady in the United Kingdom, and Harper's Bazaar in the United States.

In addition to her bestselling novels, including Prime Time and Love & Desire & Hate, she has also written six lifestyle books, including The Joan Collins Beauty Book, as well as memoirs, including Past Imperfect. To date, she has sold over 50 million copies of her books, which have been translated into 30 languages.

== Personal life ==
=== Marriages and family ===
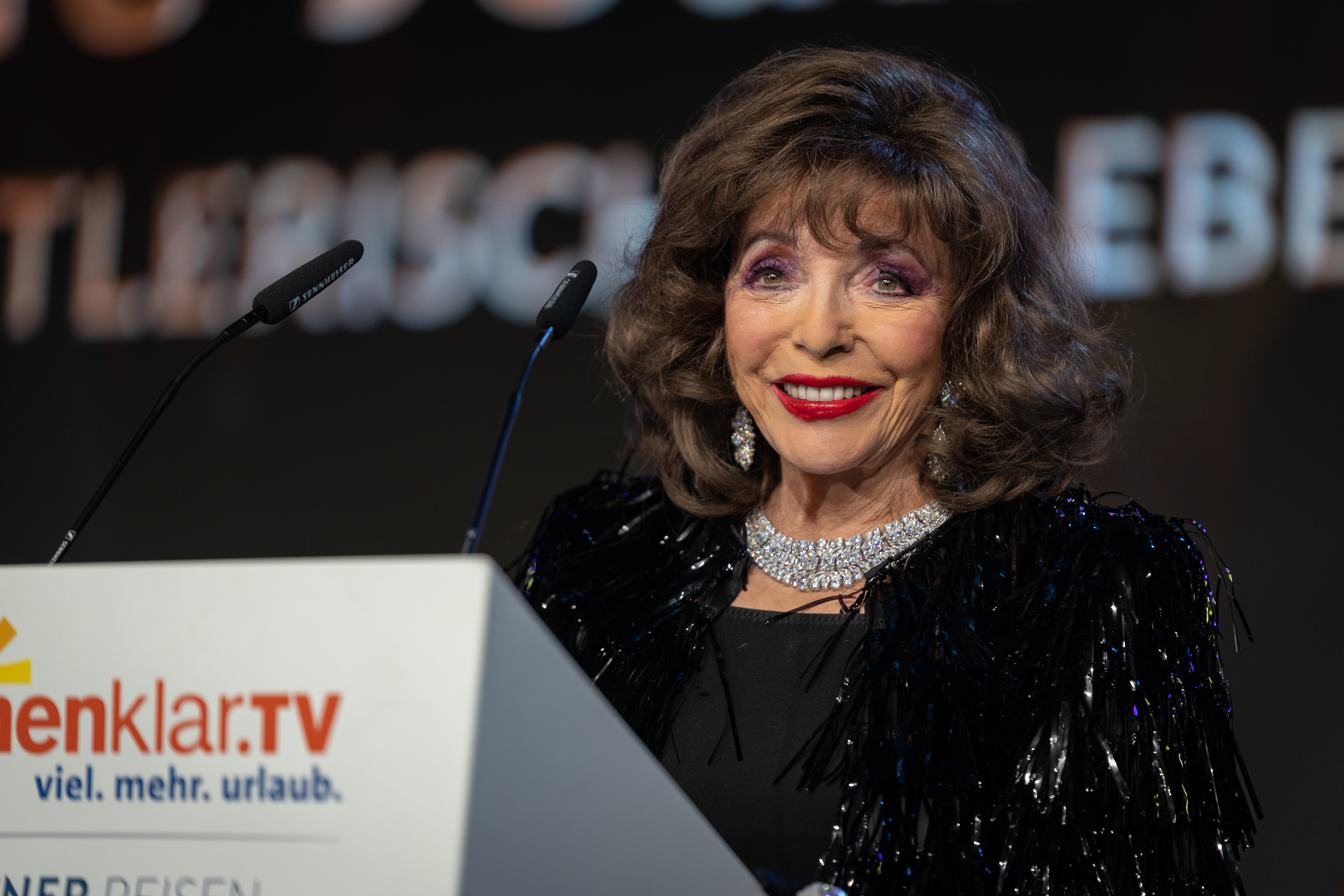
At the Goldene Sonne Awards in 2023

Collins has been married five times. She has three children and four grandchildren.

Her first husband was Irish actor Maxwell Reed, whom she wed at Caxton Hall on 24 May 1952 after he drugged and date raped her. She was 19 and a virgin, and he was 33; Collins later said she wed Reed "out of shame". Collins divorced Reed on 29 May 1956, following a two-year separation. She was in a relationship with producer Arthur Loew Jr. from 1955 to 1957. Collins began a romance with the then-unknown actor Warren Beatty in 1959. In 1960, they became engaged, and Collins had an abortion; his infidelity led to their split in 1961. Beatty later referred to the engagement as "an exaggeration."

In 1961, she began dating singer-songwriter Anthony Newley; they married in Norwalk, Connecticut on 27 May 1963 when Collins was five months pregnant. They had two children, Tara (born 12 October 1963) and Alexander (born 8 September 1965). The couple divorced on 13 August 1971 after being separated for two years due to Newley's womanizing. Collins wed her third husband, American businessman Ron Kass, on 11 March 1972 when she was six months pregnant with their daughter Katyana (born 20 June 1972). Aged 8, Katyana was hit by a car and sustained serious head and brain injuries, leaving her in a coma for 42 days. Although she later recovered, Collins later said that her daughter's car accident was "the worst thing that ever happened to me". A combination of stress from their daughter's accident, and Kass's financial instability and increased alcohol and drug use contributed to a breakdown of their marriage, and Collins and Kass divorced on 6 May 1983; they remained friends until Kass's death three years later.

Collins married former singer Peter Holm on 6 November 1985. According to Collins, the marriage quickly degenerated into a string of "interminable arguments... and hearty crockery-throwing rows." She said Holm was a bully with a ferocious temper and "the most combative person I've ever met." Collins sought an annulment in December 1986, but was instead granted a divorce 24 August 1987. The proceedings became a media circus, and Holm sought for $80,000 a month in alimony. Collins' attorney Marvin Mitchelson produced Holm's secret lover, model Romina Danielson, who fainted under cross-examination. Holm lost his case, collecting a total of $180,000, as agreed in the pre-nup.

Collins also dated Mercedes-Benz heir Friedrich Christian Flick, realtor Bill Wiggins, director George Englund, producer Robert Evans and actors Gardner McKay, Harry Belafonte, Dennis Hopper, Sydney Chaplin and Ryan O'Neal. Collins was in a relationship with art dealer Robin Hurlstone from 1988 until 2001.

Collins has been married to her fifth husband Percy Gibson, who is 32 years her junior, since 17 February 2002. The couple met in 2000 when Collins and her ex-boyfriend George Hamilton performed the play Love Letters at the Marines' Memorial Theatre in San Francisco and Gibson was the producer. The wedding took place at Claridge's Hotel in London.

Collins maintains residences in Belgravia, Beverly Hills, and Saint-Tropez, describing her life in 2010 as being "that of a gypsy". In 2019, Collins and Gibson escaped a "terrifying" fire at her London flat in Eaton Place. Gibson was able to contain the blaze using a fire extinguisher before the emergency services arrived. Collins was treated for smoke inhalation but was otherwise unharmed and thanked the emergency response crews on social media. In 2021, she sold her condo in New York City for $2 million.

=== Random House Court case ===
In the 1990s, Collins was embroiled in a high-profile legal battle with the publisher Random House, which was televised daily on Court TV. Collins had signed a two-book deal with the company for $4 million and they had given her a $1.2 million advance. In September 1991, Collins delivered a 690-page manuscript of a novel entitled The Ruling Passion to Random House. However, the publishing firm deemed the manuscript to be of poor quality and demanded the return of the $1.2 million advance they had paid to Collins, claiming she had failed to deliver completed books as per her contract. Collins countersued, arguing that her contract required her only to submit a "complete manuscript" not an "acceptable" one. Since she had turned in two novels to the publishing company, A Ruling Passion in 1991 and a second novel, Hell Hath No Fury, in 1992, as her contract stipulated, she felt Random House owed her the rest of the $4 million. She contended that Random House had not provided the editorial assistance she had expected.

Her Random House contract, negotiated by agent Irving Lazar, required that she be paid even if her completed manuscripts were not published. When the case was finally heard in February 1996, a court determined that Collins could keep the advance given to her plus a further $1 million for the first completed manuscript, but that the publisher did not have to pay for the second manuscript, since it was essentially a reworking of the first.

=== Political views ===
Collins was a supporter of Prime Minister Margaret Thatcher, and was invited to attend her funeral on 17 April 2013. She also said: "I'm a big monarchist and I love the Queen." In 2004, it was announced she had become a Patron of the UK Independence Party, though she later said this did not necessarily mean she would vote for the party. In 2013, she supported British withdrawal from the European Union.

In October 2023, Collins publicly condemned the Hamas attack on Israel, describing it as "barbaric" and "completely vile". Referring to the 7 October attacks, she stated that she could not think of anything that had upset her more, besides the September 11 attacks.

== Honours ==
Collins was appointed Officer of the Order of the British Empire (OBE) in the 1997 New Year Honours for services to drama and advanced to Dame Commander of the Order of the British Empire (DBE) in the 2015 New Year Honours for services to charity.

She was given a star on the Hollywood Walk of Fame in 1983.

== Bibliography ==
Memoir

- Past Imperfect: An Autobiography – UK version (1978)
- Katy: A Fight for Life, A Memoir (1982)
- Past Imperfect: An Autobiography – US version (1984)
- Second Act: An Autobiography (1996)
- The World According to Joan (2011)
- Passion For Life: An Autobiography (2013)
- My Unapologetic Diaries by Joan Collins (2021)
- Behind the Shoulder Pads: Stories I Only Tell my Friends (2023)

Nonfiction

- The Joan Collins Beauty Book (1980)
- My Secrets (1994)
- Health, Youth and Happiness: My Secrets (1995)
- My Friends' Secrets (1999)
- Joan's Way: Looking Good, Feeling Great (2002)
- The Art of Living Well: Looking Good, Feeling Great (2007)

Fiction

- Prime Time, a novel (1988)
- Love and Desire and Hate, a novel (1990)
- Too Damn Famous, a novel (1995) retitled Infamous for US (1996)
- Star Quality, a novel (2002)
- Misfortune's Daughters, a novel (2005)
- The St. Tropez Lonely Hearts Club, a novel (2015)

By other authors

- Joan Collins by John Kercher, Gallery Books (1984)
- Joan Collins: The Unauthorised Biography by Jeff Rovin, Bantam Books (1984)
- Joan Collins, Superstar: A Biography by Robert Levine, Dell Publishing (1985)
- A Touch of Collins by Joe Collins, Columbus Books (1986)
- Portraits of a Star by Eddie Sanderson, Hodder & Stoughton (1987)
- Inside Joan Collins: A Biography by Jay David, Carroll & Graf Publishers, Inc. (1988)
- Hollywood Sisters: Jackie and Joan Collins by Susan Crimp and Patricia Burstein, St. Martin's Press (1989)
- Joan Collins: The Biography of an Icon by Graham Lord, Orion (2007)

== Acting credits ==
=== Film ===
Year	Title	Role	Notes
1951	Lady Godiva Rides Again	Beauty Queen Contestant	Uncredited
1951	Facts and Fancies	Teenager	Short subject
1952	The Woman's Angle	Marina	
1952	Judgment Deferred	Lil Carter	
1952	I Believe in You	Norma Hart	
1953	Decameron Nights	Pampinea / Maria	
1953	Cosh Boy	Rene Collins	
1953	Turn the Key Softly	Stella Jarvis	
1953	The Square Ring	Frankie	
1953	Our Girl Friday	Sadie Patch	
1954	The Good Die Young	Mary Halsey	
1955	Land of the Pharaohs	Princess Nellifer	
1955	The Virgin Queen	Beth Throckmorton	
1955	The Girl in the Red Velvet Swing	Evelyn Nesbit Thaw	
1956	The Opposite Sex	Crystal	
1957	Sea Wife	Sea Wife	
1957	The Wayward Bus	Alice Chicoy	
1957	Island in the Sun	Jocelyn Fleury	
1957	Stopover Tokyo	Tina Llewellyn	
1958	The Bravados	Josefa Velarde	
1958	Rally 'Round the Flag, Boys!	Angela Hoffa	
1960	Seven Thieves	Melanie	
1960	Esther and the King	Esther	
1962	The Road to Hong Kong	Diane	
1965	Hard Time for Princes	Jane	
1967	Warning Shot	Joanie Valens	
1968	Subterfuge	Anne Langley	
1969	Can Heironymus Merkin Ever Forget Mercy Humppe and Find True Happiness?	Polyester Poontang	
1969	If It's Tuesday, This Must Be Belgium	Girl on Sidewalk	Cameo appearance
1969	Besieged	Roberta	
1970	The Executioner	Sarah Booth	
1970	Up in the Cellar	Pat Camber	
1971	Revenge	Carol Radford	
1971	Quest for Love	Ottilie Trafford / Tracy Fletcher	
1972	Tales from the Crypt	Joanne Clayton	
1972	Fear in the Night aka 'Fright In The Night'	Molly Carmichael	
1973	Tales That Witness Madness	Bella Thompson	
1974	L'arbitro aka 'Football Crazy'	Elena Sperani	
1974	Dark Places	Sarah Mandeville	
1975	Alfie Darling	Fay	
1975	The Great Adventure	Sonia Kendall	
1975	I Don't Want to Be Born aka 'The Monster'	Lucy Carlesi	
1976	The Bawdy Adventures of Tom Jones	Black Bess	
1977	Empire of the Ants	Marilyn Fryser	
1978	Fearless	Brigitte	
1978	The Big Sleep	Agnes Lozelle	
1978	The Stud	Fontaine Khaled	
1978	Zero to Sixty	Gloria Martine	
1979	Game for Vultures	Nicolle	
1979	Sunburn	Nera	
1979	The Bitch	Fontaine Khaled	
1982	Homework	Diane	
1982	Nutcracker	Laura Carrere	
1994	Decadence	Helen / Sybil	
1995	In the Bleak Midwinter	Margaretta D'Arcy	
1997	Coronation Street: Viva Las Vegas!	Joan Collins	
1999	Joseph and the Amazing Technicolor Dreamcoat	Mrs. Potiphar	
1999	The Clandestine Marriage	Mrs. Heidelberg	Also associate producer
2000	The Flintstones in Viva Rock Vegas	Pearl Slaghoople	
2004	Ellis in Glamourland	Susan	
2006	Ozzie	Max Happy	
2009	Banksy's Coming for Dinner	Joan	
2010	Fetish	Francesca Vonn	Short subject
2013	Saving Santa	Vera Baddington	Voice
2015	Molly Moon and the Incredible Book of Hypnotism	Nockman's Mother	
2016	Absolutely Fabulous: The Movie	Herself	Cameo
2017	The Time of Their Lives	Helen Shelley	Also executive producer
2018	Gerry	Hilda	Short subject
2020	The Loss Adjuster	Margaret Rogerton-Sykes	
2022	Tomorrow Morning	Anna	
2022	The Gentle Sex	Major Connie Brown	Short subject
2025	A Murder Between Friends	Francesca Carlyle	Also producer
2026	My Duchess	Wallis Simpson	

=== Television ===
Year	Title	Role	Notes
1964	The Human Jungle	Liz Kross	Episode: "Struggle for a Mind"
1966	Run for Your Life	Gilian Wales	Episode: "The Borders of Barbarism"
1966	The Man from U.N.C.L.E.	Baroness Bibi De Chasseur / Rosy Shlagenheimer	Episode: "The Galatea Affair"
1967	The Virginian	Lorna Marie Marshall	Episode: "The Lady from Wichita"
1967	Batman	The Siren (Lorelei Circe)	Episodes: "Ring Around the Riddler" and "The Wail of the Siren"
1967	The Danny Thomas Hour	Myra	Episode: "The Demon Under the Bed"
1967	Star Trek	Edith Keeler	Episode: "The City on the Edge of Forever"
1969	Mission: Impossible	Nicole Vedette	Episode: "Nicole"
1972	The Persuaders!	Sidonie	Episode: "Five Miles to Midnight"
1972	The Man Who Came to Dinner	Lorraine Sheldon	TV movie
1973	Drive Hard, Drive Fast	Carole Bradley	TV movie
1973	Orson Welles Great Mysteries	Jane Blake	Episode: "The Dinner Party"
1974	Fallen Angels	Jane Banbury	TV movie
1975	Ellery Queen	Lady Daisy Frawley	Episode: "The Adventure of Auld Lang Syne"
1975	Switch	Jackie Simon	Episode: "Stung from Beyond"
1975	Space: 1999	Kara	Episode: "Mission of the Darians"
1976	Baretta	Lynn Stiles	Episode: "Pay or Die"
1976	Police Woman	Lorelei Frank / Prudence Clark	Episodes: "The Pawn Shop" and "The Trick Book"
1976	Arthur Hailey's the Moneychangers	Avril Devereaux	TV miniseries
1976	Gibbsville	Andrea	Episode: "Andrea"
1977	The Fantastic Journey	Queen Halyana	Episode: "Turnabout"
1977	Future Cop	Eve Di Falco	Episode: "The Kansas City Kid"
1977	Starsky & Hutch	Janice	Episode: "Starsky and Hutch on Playboy Island"
1979	Tales of the Unexpected	Lady Natalia Turton	Episode: "Neck"
1980	Tales of the Unexpected	Clare Duckworth/Julia Roach	Episode: "Georgy Porgy"
1980	Tales of the Unexpected	Suzy Starr	Episode "A Girl Can't Always Have Everything"
1980	Fantasy Island	Lucy Atwell	Episode: "My Fair Pharaoh/The Power"
1981–1989	Dynasty	Alexis Morell Carrington Colby	Series regular (Season 2–8), recurring (Season 9) 195 episodes
1982	Paper Dolls	Racine	TV movie
1982	The Wild Women of Chastity Gulch	Annie McCulloch	TV movie
1983	Making of a Male Model	Kay Dillon	TV movie
1983	The Love Boat	Janine Adams	Episode: "The Captain's Crush/Out of My Hair/Off-Course Romance"
1983	Faerie Tale Theatre	Stepmother / Witch	Episode: "Hansel and Gretel"
1984	The Cartier Affair	Cartier Rand / Marilyn Hallifax	TV movie
1984	Her Life as a Man	Pam Dugan	TV movie
1986	Sins	Helene Junot	TV miniseries, also executive producer
1986	Monte Carlo	Katrina Petrovna	TV miniseries, also executive producer
1991	Tonight at 8:30	Various	Series regular, 8 episodes, also executive producer
1991	Dynasty: The Reunion	Alexis Morrell Carrington Colby Dexter Rowan	TV miniseries
1993	Roseanne	Ronnie	Episode: "First Cousin, Twice Removed"
1993	Mama's Back	Tamara Hamilton	TV pilot
1993	Egoli: Place of Gold	Catherine Sinclair	Special Guest Star
1995	Hart to Hart: Two Harts in 3/4 Time	Lady Camilla	TV movie
1995	Annie: A Royal Adventure!	Lady Edwina Hogbottom	TV movie
1996	The Nanny	Joan Sheffield	Episode: "Me and Mrs. Joan"
1997	Pacific Palisades	Christina Hobson	7 episodes
1998	Sweet Deception	Arianna	TV movie
2000	Will & Grace	Helena Barnes	Episode: "My Best Friend's Tush"
2001	These Old Broads	Addie Holden	TV movie
2002	Guiding Light	Alexandra Spaulding	7 episodes
2005	Slavery and the Making of America	Reenactor	Episode: "Seeds of Destruction"
2006	Hotel Babylon	Lady Imogen Patton	Episode: "1.7"
2006	Footballers' Wives	Eva De Wolffe	2 episodes
2009	Agatha Christie's Marple	Ruth Van Rydock	Episode: "They Do It with Mirrors"
2010	Verbotene Liebe	Lady Joan	3 episodes
2010	Rules of Engagement	Bunny Dunbar	Episode: "Les-bro"
2012–2013	Happily Divorced	Joan Collins	3 episodes
2013	Celebrity Deal or No Deal	Herself / Contestant	Television special
2014–2017	Benidorm	Crystal Hennessy-Vass	4 episodes
2015–2018	The Royals	Alexandra, Grand Duchess of Oxford	7 episodes
2018	American Horror Story: Apocalypse	Evie Gallant	Episodes: "The End" and "The Morning After"
2018	American Horror Story: Apocalypse	Bubbles McGee	Episodes: "Traitor" and "Fire and Reign"
2019	Hawaii Five-0	Amanda Savage	Episode: "Ai no i ka 'ape he mane'o no ko ka nuku"
2021	Glow and Darkness	Adelaide of Maurienne	10 episodes
2024	The Reluctant Traveler	Herself	Episode: "France: The Secrets of Saint-Tropez"

=== Theatre ===
Year	Title	Role	Venue
1946	A Doll's House	Emmy	Arts Theatre, London
1952	The Seventh Veil	Francesca Cunningham	Q Theatre, London
1952	Jassy	Jassy	Q Theatre, London
1953	Claudia and David	Claudia	Q Theatre, London
1954	The Praying Mantis	Martina	UK Tour
1954	The Skin of Our Teeth	Sabina	Q Theatre, London
1980–1981	The Last of Mrs. Cheyney	Mrs. Cheyney	Chichester Festival Theatre/Cambridge Theatre, London
1981	Murder in Mind	Mary	Yvonne Arnaud Theatre, Guildford/Theatre Royal, Brighton
1990–1991	Private Lives	Amanda Prynne	Theatre Royal, Bath/Aldwych Theatre, London
1992	Private Lives	Amanda Prynne	Broadhurst Theatre, New York City
2000	Love Letters	Melissa Gardner	US Tour
2001	Over the Moon	Charlotte Benson	The Old Vic, London
2004	Full Circle	Denise Darvel	UK Tour
2006	An Evening with Joan Collins	Herself	UK Tour
2006–2007	Legends	Sylvia Glenn	North American Tour
2010	One Night with Joan	Herself	Feinsteins at the Regency, New York City
2010–2011	Dick Whittington	Queen Rat	Birmingham Hippodrome
2011	One Night with Joan	Herself	Australian Tour
2011–2014	One Night with Joan	Herself	Leicester Square Theatre, London
2013	One Night with Joan	Herself	UK Tour
2016	Joan Collins Unscripted	Herself	UK Tour
2019	Joan Collins Unscripted	Herself	London Palladium/UK Tour
2021	Joan Collins is Unapologetic	Herself	UK Tour
2023	Behind the Shoulder Pads	Herself	UK Tour

== Awards and nominations ==
Award	Year	Nominated work	Category	Result	Ref.
CableACE Awards	1983	Faerie Tale Theatre	Actress in a Dramatic Presentation	Nominated	
East Europe International Film Festival	2020	The Loss Adjuster	Best Lead Actress	Won	
Golden Apple Awards	1982	Herself	Female Star of the Year	Won	
Golden Kamera Awards	1999	Dynasty	Millennium Award	Won	
Golden Globe Awards	1982	Dynasty	Best Actress in a Television Series – Drama	Nominated	
Golden Globe Awards	1983	Dynasty	Best Actress in a Television Series – Drama	Won	
Golden Globe Awards	1984	Dynasty	Best Actress in a Television Series – Drama	Nominated	
Golden Globe Awards	1985	Dynasty	Best Actress in a Television Series – Drama	Nominated	
Golden Globe Awards	1986	Dynasty	Best Actress in a Television Series – Drama	Nominated	
Golden Globe Awards	1987	Dynasty	Best Actress in a Television Series – Drama	Nominated	
Idyllwild International Festival of Cinema	2023	The Gentle Sex	Best Actress	Nominated	
LA Shorts International Film Festival	2018	Gerry	Best Actress	Won	
Monte Carlo TV Festival	2001	Herself	Outstanding Female Actor	Won	
National Film Awards UK	2017	Herself	Global Contribution to Motion Picture Award	Nominated	
NewNowNext Awards	2013	Herself	Coolest Cameo	Nominated	
People's Choice Awards	1984	Dynasty	Favorite Female TV Performer	Nominated	
People's Choice Awards	1985	Dynasty	Favorite Female TV Performer	Won	
People's Choice Awards	1986	Dynasty	Favorite Female TV Performer	Nominated	
Photoplay Awards	1955	Herself	Most Promising Female Star	Won	
Primetime Emmy Awards	1984	Dynasty	Outstanding Lead Actress in a Drama Series	Nominated	
Saturn Awards	1978	Empire of the Ants	Best Actress	Nominated	
Soap Opera Digest Awards	1984	Dynasty	Outstanding Villainess	Won	
Soap Opera Digest Awards	1985	Dynasty	Outstanding Villainess	Won	
Soap Opera Digest Awards	1986	Dynasty	Outstanding Actress/Actor in a Comic Relief Role	Nominated	
Soap Opera Digest Awards	1986	Dynasty	Outstanding Villainess	Nominated	
Soap Opera Digest Awards	1988	Dynasty	Outstanding Villainess	Nominated	
TV Land Awards	2003	Dynasty	Hippest Fashion Plate Female	Nominated	
Variety’s Power of Women London Awards	2026	Herself	Power of Women Icon of the Year	Won	
Women in Film and Television International Awards	2025	Herself	Lifetime Achievement Award	Won	
