= Hollywood Wives =

Hollywood Wives may refer to:

- Hollywood Wives (novel), a 1983 novel by Jackie Collins
- Hollywood Wives (miniseries), a 1985 television miniseries based on the novel
- Hollywood Wives: The New Generation, a 2003 television film
