= Love Killer =

Love Killer may refer to:

- "Love Killer" (The Killer Barbies song)
- "Love Killer", song by Cheryl Cole from A Million Lights
- "Love Killer", song by Blutengel from Demon Kiss
- The Love Killers, a 1989 republishing of Jackie Collins novel Lovehead

== See also ==
- Lovekiller (disambiguation)
- Killer Love
