= Hollywood Husbands =

1986 novel by Jackie Collins

- First edition (US)
- Author: Jackie Collins
- Language: English
- Genre: novel
- Publisher: Simon & Schuster (US)
- Publication date: 1986
- Publication place: United States
- Media type: Print (Hardcover & Paperback)
- Pages: 536
- ISBN: 0-671-72451-7
- OCLC: 7671400799
- Preceded by: Lucky (1985)
- Followed by: Rock Star (1988)

Hollywood Husbands is a 1986 novel by the British author Jackie Collins. It was her 11th novel, and the second in her "Hollywood" series, after her 1983 hit Hollywood Wives.

Hollywood Husbands is an indirect sequel to Hollywood Wives and features a new cast of characters (though the character of talent agent Sadie LaSalle from Hollywood Wives makes a brief appearance). Although it continues the theme of power and celebrity in Hollywood, the novel also contains a mystery plot about a young girl from a small American town, who was sexually abused and later left for dead. Years later, the Hollywood husbands may be the ones to feel the heat of her burning revenge.

Collins went on to pen several more "Hollywood" titled books, including Hollywood Kids (1994), Hollywood Wives: The New Generation (2001), and Hollywood Divorces (2003).

== Main characters ==
- Jack Python is a primetime television talk show host. With one expensive divorce behind him, and now involved in a highly erotic affair with Oscar-winning actress Clarissa Browning, Jack Python has power, charisma, success, and money. But sometimes everything is not enough.
- Howard Soloman is the head of Orpheus Studios. Anything Howard wants, he gets. Including women. The sweet smell of power and Howard's street-smart style reels them in. Working for billionaire studio owner Zachary Klinger, a man with a whim of iron, Howard has problems enough. And if Howard cannot deliver daytime soap megastar Silver Anderson at Klinger's command, he may lose his footing at the top of the heap.
- Mannon Cable is a movie star. With great looks and a body to match, he is full of self-deprecating charm. Married briefly to gorgeous Whitney Valentine, who left him to become a television superstar; he was hit by the divorce where it really hurts—his giant ego.
- Jade Johnson - a top New York model.
- Silver Anderson - a successful television soap opera star.
- Wesley Money - the young, handsome husband of Silver Anderson. He is a street smart ex-bartender who loves Silver and takes care of all her needs.
- Whitney Valentine - Mannon's ex-wife and a beautiful but talentless actress and pop star.
- Clarissa Browning - a "serious", award-winning Hollywood actress who is also a psychotic serial killer.
- Heaven Anderson Klinger - Silver Anderson's estranged teenage daughter and Jack Python's beloved niece. She is also the secret love child of multi billionaire Zachary Klinger. She goes on to become a singing sensation, prompting her mother's jealousy.
