= Jan de Souza =

British model (1940–2022)

- Jan de Souza, from a 1967 magazine
- Born: Jan Margaret de Souza; 14 August 1940; Agra, India
- Died: 11 June 2022 (aged 81)
- Occupations: Fashion model, nightclub hostess
- Spouse: Johnny Gold

Jan Margaret de Souza Gold (14 August 1940 – 11 June 2022) was a British model and nightclub hostess.

== Early life ==
Jan de Souza was born in Agra, India, the daughter of George de Souza and Inez de Souza. Her father was a railway executive. Her first language was Hindi; she was raised in London after 1948.

== Career ==
At art school in the early 1960s, de Souza met designer Mary Quant, and became a model for Quant's fashion ideas, especially the popular miniskirt. She also modeled designs by Foale and Tuffin, posed with musicians including a young David Bowie, and usually appeared in a short Vidal Sassoon hairstyle. She worked in Australia in 1967 and 1968. She retired from modeling after she married in 1971, and was the hostess of her husband's exclusive Tramp nightclub in London.

== Personal life ==
Jan de Souza married Johnny Gold in 1971; writer Jackie Collins stood as de Souza's maid of honor at the wedding. They had two children. They retired to the Bahamas in 2003, and he died in October 2021. She died from cancer in June 2022, at the age of 81.
