= The World Is Full of Married Men (film) =

1979 film by Robert Young

- Region 2 DVD cover
- Directed by: Robert William Young
- Screenplay by: Jackie Collins
- Based on: The World Is Full of Married Men by Jackie Collins
- Produced by: Malcolm Fancey; Oscar Lerman
- Starring: Anthony Franciosa; Carroll Baker; Gareth Hunt; Georgina Hale; Anthony Steel; Sherrie Lee Cronn; Paul Nicholas
- Cinematography: Ray Parslow
- Edited by: David Campling
- Music by: Dominic Bugatti; Frank Musker
- Production company: Married Men
- Distributed by: New Realm
- Release date: 30 May 1979 (London)
- Running time: 107 minutes
- Country: United Kingdom
- Language: English
- Box office: $977,326

The World Is Full of Married Men is a 1979 British romantic drama film directed by Robert William Young, based on Jackie Collins' 1968 novel of the same name.

== Plot ==
When Linda Cooper, the wife of advertising executive David Cooper, discovers his adulterous affairs including his current one with ambitious model Claudia Parker, she decides to embark on her own affair with rock singer Gem Gemini.

== Cast ==
- Anthony Franciosa as David Cooper
- Carroll Baker as Linda Cooper
- Sherrie Lee Cronn as Claudia Parker
- Paul Nicholas as Gem Gemini
- Gareth Hunt as Jay Grossman
- Georgina Hale as Lori Grossman
- Anthony Steel as Conrad Lee
- John Nolan as Joe
- Jean Gilpin as Miss Field
- Moira Downie as Gerda
- Alison Elliott as Sharon
- Eva Louise as Mercedes Benz
- Joanne Ridley as Joanie
- Emma Ridley as Lucy
- Roy Scammell as Jeff Spencer
- Susie Silvey as Girl in Hotel (credited as Suzie Silvey)
- Stephanie Marrian as Girl in Hotel (credited as Stephanie Marriane)

== Production ==
A film adaptation of Collins' novel was announced to capitalize on the successes of The Stud (1978) and The Bitch (1979), two of Collins' other novels adapted for the screen. The film is set in the late 1970s, as opposed to the novel's 1960s setting.

According to Collins' website, "the glamorous but seedy world of entertainment provides the setting for Jackie Collins' explosive expose' of sexual double standards and naked ambition."

It marked the first time in several years that Anthony Steel had been seen in a widely distributed film in English speaking countries.

== Soundtrack ==
Due to its setting, the film's soundtrack, released as a double album by Ronco Records, made extensive use of disco music, including Maxine Nightingale's "Right Back Where We Started From", and even featured an appearance by famed dance troupe Hot Gossip. Welsh singer Bonnie Tyler had a UK Top 40 hit with the title track to the film, and also appeared in the film, performing the song during the opening credits.

== Release and reception ==
The film premiered in London on 30 May 1979 before opening a week later. It would not see a North American theatrical release until March 1980.

Variety called it "sexploitation melodrama which, cunningly, will titillate both sexes." Franciosa "brings a mercifully light touch", Nicholas was "uncharismatic", and Hale was "effective as a laconic wife".
