= Johnny Gold =

British nightclub owner (1932–2021)

Jesse John Gold (25 June 1932 – 7 October 2021) was a British nightclub owner and operator. After studying at Brighton College and National Service with the 6th Royal Tank Regiment, Gold worked briefly in his father's bookmakers. He moved to London in the mid 1950s and was hired by Oscar Lerman to run the Dolly's night club. In 1969, along with Lerman and Bill Ofner, he founded the nightclub Tramp. Although, Gold thought the club might survive only 2 to 3 years, it became popular with celebrities. He sold his stake in 1998 but remained until 2003 as "greeter-in-chief". Gold retired to the Bahamas.

== Early life ==
Jesse John Gold was born on 25 June 1932 in Stamford Hill, London. He was the son of Sam Gold, a Jewish bookmaker and former milliner. At the age of seven, Gold's family moved to Brighton, Sussex. He attended the private Brighton College from 1940 to 1945 as a boarder, rather than a day boy, because he "wanted to feel more part of it". He performed poorly in academic subjects, preferring field sports and boxing. After school he spent 1950–52 on National Service in Germany with the 6th Royal Tank Regiment. On returning to England, he worked in his father's betting shop.

By the mid 1950s, Gold had moved to London to work in the clothing industry. He frequented the Nightingale and Crazy Elephant clubs where he met American actor John Wayne who helped him to pick up women. He met Oscar Lerman through his attendance at clubs. Lerman had founded the Ad Lib Club in 1964 and subsequently hired Gold to run his Dolly's club despite his lack of experience. Dolly's became fashionable and was frequented by some of the Beatles, the Rolling Stones, the Kray twins, David Bailey, George Best and Keith Moon.

== Tramp ==
Gold, Lerman and Bill Ofner joined as business partners to open Tramp, a nightclub on London's Jermyn Street, in December 1969. Gold had primary responsibility for running the club. It was positioned as an alternative to the smart supper clubs then in fashion and was named after Charlie Chaplin's comedic film persona. Tramp started with 300 celebrity members, each paying an annual fee of 10 guineas. Gold thought the club might last only two or three years before the celebrities moved on to another venue but was surprised by its continued popularity. He cultivated a reputation for discretion, banning photographs inside and preventing paparazzi and gossip writers from entering. When a newspaper described Tramp as a disreputable club attended by "tarty little pieces", Gold sued and won damages.

The club was popular with Jackie Collins who likened Gold to "an old whore, always there, always ready for your demands and always prepared to give you a good time". The nightclub scenes in the 1978 film The Stud, based on Collins' 1969 novel, were filmed in Tramp. Gold thought that the club manager character in the film might have been based on him. Despite a number of reported antics in the club Gold rarely banned any of his regulars. When The Who drummer Keith Moon destroyed a chandelier he was banned for a month but Gold reduced this to 48 hours after Moon phoned him in tears and sent a payment of £500 in cash. At one stage Moon's bar tab reached £14,000.

Gold became close friends with film producer Dodi Fayed through the club. Gold claimed that one night he dragged Fayed away from one young lady in the club, when Fayed protested Gold told him "I happen to know she’s sleeping with your father" (billionaire Mohammed Al-Fayed). One night Dodi Fayed learnt it was Gold's wife's birthday; he took off the Cartier gold chain he was wearing around his neck and gave it to her.

Gold usually returned home from the club at around 5.00 am to take his two Alsatian dogs for a walk. He established a Los Angeles branch of Tramp in the 1980s. In 1995, Gold attended the funeral of Gordon White, Baron White of Hull in his capacity, The Times said, as an owner of one of "London's most fashionable nightclubs for the outrageously rich". In 1998, he sold his stake in Tramp to Edinburgh-based property firm Caledonian Heritable. He continued as an employee of the club for five years as "greeter-in-chief", as he was the only person who knew all the club's members personally. He received the 2000 Bacardi London Club and Bar Awards outstanding achievement award. There was some concern among members ahead of the 2001 publication of his memoir Tramp's Gold but he maintained his discretion and it caused no scandal. The foreword to the book was written by Tramp member Michael Caine. Gold explained that his secret to success was "to treat the celebrities as ordinary people, and the ordinary people as celebrities".

== Later life ==
Gold retired in 2003, moving to the Bahamas with his wife, former model Jan de Souza. The couple had married in 1971 and had two children, Claire and Nick, who also work in the hospitality industry. Gold returned to Tramp in 2012 for his 80th birthday party. He died from unknown causes on 7 October 2021, at the age of 89. His widow, Jan, died on 11 June 2022, at the age of 81.
