= Sunday Simmons & Charlie Brick =

1971 novel by Jackie Collins

- First edition
- Author: Jackie Collins
- Language: English
- Published: 1971
- Publisher: W. H. Allen
- Publication place: England

Sunday Simmons & Charlie Brick was the third novel from English novelist Jackie Collins, published in 1971 by W. H. Allen, it was retitled The Hollywood Zoo in 1975 and then as Sinners in 1984.

This would be Collins' first novel set in Los Angeles (the previous two had been set in London) and also the first one that centred on the lives and loves of film stars. The character of Charlie Brick was said to be based on actor comedian Peter Sellers, a close friend of Collins' at the time.

== Plot ==
Sunday Simmons is an aspiring actress. The daughter of a South American father and French mother, she left Rio de Janeiro to attend a drama academy in London. Two days after her departure, her parents were killed in a car crash.

Charlie Brick, forty and well-known, was regarded as one of the world’s leading comedic actors, though his relationships with women, including his distant wife Lorna, were consistently disappointing.

Herbert Lincoln Jefferson was working as a chauffeur for one of the Hollywood film companies. While his grotesquely fat wife, Marge, watched TV and ate all day, he was indulging in perverse sexual fantasies.

The lives of the three characters intertwine when they meet in Hollywood.

== Reception ==
Sunday Simmons & Charlie Brick was Collins' third bestseller and, like her previous two novels The World Is Full Of Married Men and The Stud, her new novel sparked controversy for its sexually explicit nature.
