= Lady Boss =

1990 novel by Jackie Collins

- First US edition
- Author: Jackie Collins
- Language: English
- Series: Santangelo novels
- Publisher: Simon & Schuster (US); Heinemann (UK)
- Publication date: 1990
- Publication place: United States
- Media type: Hardcover
- Pages: 640
- ISBN: 978-0-671-02347-8
- OCLC: 44539299
- Preceded by: Lucky
- Followed by: Vendetta: Lucky's Revenge

Lady Boss is a 1990 novel written by Jackie Collins and the third in her Santangelo novels series.

The novel was adapted as a TV movie miniseries in 1992, starring Kim Delaney in the title role of Lucky Santangelo. Co-stars include Jack Scalia, Yvette Mimieux, Joan Rivers, Beth Toussaint, Alan Rachins, Vanity (singer) , and John Randolph.

== Plot ==
Lady Boss tells the story of Lucky Santangelo taking over a movie studio in Hollywood called "Panther Studios."

== Miniseries ==
The novel inspired an NBC miniseries with the teleplay by Jackie Collins and directed by Charles Jarrott in 1992.

It follows 1990's NBC miniseries Lucky Chances, although only Phil Morris reprises his role as Steven Morris. Kim Delaney replaces Nicollette Sheridan as Lucky, Jack Scalia replaces Tim Ryan as Lennie, and Joe Cortese replaces Luca Bercovici as Santino.

Future President Donald Trump appears in a cameo appearance as himself, as he did previously in 1987's CBS miniseries I'll Take Manhattan.

| Actor | Role |
Starring
| Kim Delaney | Lucky Santangelo |
| Jack Scalia | Lennie Golden |
| Alan Rachins | Mickey Stoner |
| Phil Morris | Steven Dimes |
| Yvette Mimieux | Deena Swanson |
| Beth Toussaint | Venus Maria |
| Vanity | Mary Lou Morley |
| Scott Valentine | Ron |
| Robin Strasser | Abigaile Stoner |
| John Randolph | Abe Panther |
| Joe Cortese | Santino Bonnatti |
| Jeff Kaake | Eddie Kane |
| Douglas Barr | Jerry Masterson |
| Georgann Johnson | Olive Sertner |
Special appearance by
| Anthony John Denison | Cooper Turner |
| Joan Rivers | Bibi Grant |
| David Selby | Martin Swanson |
Also starring
| John Sanderford | |
| Daniel Quinn | Emilio |
| William Shockley | Axel Porter |
| Vanessa Angel | Christie |
| Mark Blankfield | |
| Jack Dengel | |
| Nick Tate | |
