= Yesterday's Hero (disambiguation) =

Yesterday's Hero is a 1979 film.

Yesterday's Hero may also refer to:

- "Yesterday's Hero" (Gene Pitney song), a 1964 single
- "Yesterday's Hero" (John Paul Young song), a 1975 single
- "Yesterday's Hero", a 1979 single by Paul Nicholas from the film composed by Bugatti and Musker
- Yesterday's Hero (soundtrack), LP album from the film Yesterday's Hero
