= Georgina Hale =

British actress (1943–2024)

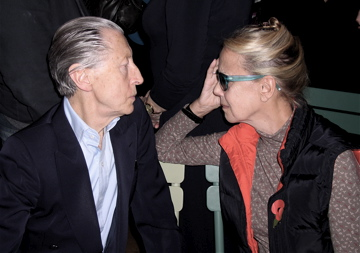
- Hale (right) and actor Murray Melvin in 2007
- Born: Georgina Hale; 4 August 1943; Ilford, Essex, England
- Died: 4 January 2024 (aged 80); Luxor, Egypt
- Education: Royal Academy of Dramatic Art
- Occupation: Actress
- Years active: 1963–2016
- Notable work: Mahler (1974); Steaming (1981)
- Spouse: John Forgeham (m. 1964; div. 1969)
- Awards: BAFTA Award for Most Promising Newcomer to Leading Film Roles (1975)

Georgina Hale (4 August 1943 – 4 January 2024) was a British actress. In a career spanning six decades, her credits include work in stage, film, and television. She was a British Academy Film Award winner and a Laurence Olivier Award nominee. In 2010, she was listed as one of ten great British character actors by The Guardian.

== Early life and education ==
Georgina Hale was born in Ilford, Essex, to publicans Elsie (née Fordham) and George Robert Hole. She later said that she had:

...a really bad education. I couldn't write, spell, or read, so it was a real problem, because that sort of thing wasn't acknowledged then. There was a real shame in it, and you were the dunce of the class, always getting whacked around the head. We were on the move a lot as well, so going to so many schools, always being the new girl, it was so frightening and so nerve-wracking as a kid, and it really affected me.

As a teenager, she worked as an apprentice hairdresser and studied Stanislavski's method approach to acting at a fledgling studio, the Chelsea Actors' Workshop, in London, and subsequently was accepted into the Royal Academy of Dramatic Art, where she graduated in 1965.

== Acting career ==
=== Stage ===
Hale made her professional debut playing unnamed parts with the Royal Shakespeare Company in 1965. She appeared in repertory theatre at Canterbury, Windsor and Ipswich, then at the Liverpool Playhouse, in 1967, where her parts included the title role in Gigi and Juliet in Romeo and Juliet. At the Thorndike Theatre in Leatherhead in October 1975, she played Eliza Doolittle in Pygmalion.

She appeared as Nina in Chekhov's The Seagull at the Derby Playhouse in July 1976, making her West End debut in the production when it transferred to the Duke of York's Theatre in August 1976. The Stage review found her performance “tender, thoughtful and charming”.

Hale played Marie Caroline David in The Tribades by Per Olov Enquist (Hampstead Theatre Club, May 1978); Melanie in Boo Hoo by Philip Magdalany (Open Space Theatre, July 1978); and Bobbi Michele in Last of the Red Hot Lovers by Neil Simon (Royal Exchange, Manchester, April 1979 – transferring to the Criterion Theatre in November 1979).

Hale starred as Josie in the original production of Steaming (Theatre Royal Stratford East, July 1981 - transferring to the Comedy Theatre in August 1981) and received a Laurence Olivier Award nomination.

In 1982, she appeared with Annette Crosbie and Richard O'Callaghan in a production of Noël Coward's Star Quality at the Theatre Royal, Bath. In April 1983 she starred opposite Glenda Jackson and Gary Oldman in Summit Conference at the Lyric Theatre, London, playing Benito Mussolini's mistress Clara Petacci. Later that year, she starred with Colin Blakely, Jane Carr and Paul Eddington in the play Lovers Dancing, directed by Donald McWhinnie, at the Noël Coward Theatre. She followed with roles in two productions at The Old Vic: Aricia in Phédre (1984) and Crystal Allen in The Women (1985).

In 1991, Hale starred opposite Glenda Jackson in Mourning Becomes Electra by Eugene O'Neill, at the Glasgow Citizens Theatre. In 1993, she appeared in a production of Alan Ayckbourn's Absurd Person Singular at the Theatre Royal, Bath. In 1994, she appeared opposite Rupert Everett in a production of Tennessee Williams' The Milk Train Doesn't Stop Here Anymore at the Glasgow Citizens Theatre. In 1997, she appeared opposite Alan Bates in Life Support by Simon Gray at the Aldwych Theatre in London. Critic Sheridan Morley wrote in The New York Times that Hale, as the bed-bound Gwen, was "supremely touching even in almost total paralysis".

Other stage appearances include The Guardsman at the Noël Coward Theatre (2000), where New York Times critic Sheridan Morley noted that Hale added "superbly timed comic support", Semi-Monde at the Lyric Theatre (2001), Britannicus (2002), The Cherry Orchard (2002) and Chéri (2003) at the Glasgow Citizens Theatre, and Take a Chance on Me at the New End Theatre (2003).

Hale's final stage role was as Nell in Charles Sturridge's production of Endgame by Samuel Beckett at the Gate Theatre, Dublin and then the Barbican, London, as part of the Beckett Centenary Festival in May 2006. The cast also featured Kenneth Cranham, Peter Dinklage and Tom Hickey.

=== Film ===
In 1971, Hale made her film debut as Betsy Balcombe in the historical drama Eagle in a Cage. Roger Greenspun of The New York Times noted that, at age 24, Hale displayed "a kind of mature intensity that argues for at least 30 years' experience on the stage".

Hale appeared as Alma Mahler in Ken Russell's Mahler (1974), opposite Robert Powell as Gustav Mahler. Her performance earned her the 1975 BAFTA Award for Most Promising Newcomer to Leading Film Roles. Stephen Farber of Film Comment wrote:

Georgina Hale gives an electric performance as Alma. She is touchingly vulnerable in all the flashback sequences, while in the scenes on the train she presents a completely different side of Alma’s character-a supremely bitter, savagely sarcastic shrew. Alma’s imperious, ice-cold facade is the mask she has chiseled to conceal her frustration and disappointment over the stifling of her creative potential. The tension is palpable: We can feel the anger and pain seething beneath her sardonic exterior.

Hale also made appearances in a number of Russell's other films, with roles in The Devils (1971), The Boy Friend (1971), Lisztomania (1975), Valentino (1977), and Treasure Island (1995). Russell later referred to Hale as "an actress of such sensitivity that she can make the hair rise on your arms".

Hale played a supporting role in the romantic drama The World is Full of Married Men (1979), based on the novel of the same name by Jackie Collins. Variety noted that Hale was "effective as a laconic wife who's come to terms with the sexcess scene".

Hale had a small role in the film The Watcher in the Woods (1980), starring Bette Davis. Hale took the role of the younger version of Davis' character largely because of her admiration for Davis.

Her other film appearances included supporting roles in Butley (1974), Sweeney 2 (1978), McVicar (1980), Castaway (1986), Preaching to the Perverted (1997), Mrs Palfrey at the Claremont (2005), and Cockneys vs Zombies (2011).

=== Television ===
Hale's television career spanned six decades. Her first major television appearances were supporting roles in plays filmed for The Wednesday Play, ITV Playhouse and ITV Play of the Week. Recurring roles in primetime series followed, first opposite Adam Faith in Budgie (1971) as his wayward wife, and then as Lili Dietrich in the miniseries The Strauss Family (1972).

In 1973, she starred in A.D.A.M. as a physically disabled woman who develops an unusual relationship with the sentient computer system that controls her home. Directed by Michael Lindsay-Hogg, the drama was broadcast as part of the ITV Sunday Night Drama anthology strand. In 1975, Hale appeared in two television plays written by Simon Gray, broadcast as part of the BBC series Play for Today. These were Plaintiffs and Defendants and Two Sundays. In 1978, Hale appeared with Michael Gambon in the BBC Play of the Month adaptation of Anton Chekhov's The Seagull. In 1980, Hale portrayed Ruth Ellis, the last woman to be hanged in the UK, in an episode of the drama series Lady Killers.

In 1990, Hale succeeded Elizabeth Estensen in the eponymous role of T-Bag, the villainous, tea-drinking sorceress in a succession of children's adventure series produced by Thames Television. Hale played the role in four series and two Christmas specials broadcast between 1990 and 1992.

In December 1992, Hale appeared in two television plays produced by Simon Curtis, broadcast as part of the anthology series Performance. These were Luigi Pirandello's Six Characters in Search of an Author and Terence Rattigan's After the Dance.

In 1994, Hale appeared in the sitcom pilot The Honeymoon's Over, written by Paul Whitehouse and Charlie Higson, broadcast as part of the Comic Asides anthology strand on BBC Two.

In 2007, Hale made a guest appearance in the crime drama The Commander. Television critic Nancy Banks-Smith noted in The Guardian that Hale "was able to do wonders with a mere sliver of a scene".

Other television appearances include guest starring roles in Upstairs, Downstairs (1975), Minder (1980), Hammer House of Horror (1980), the Doctor Who (1988), One Foot in the Grave (1990), Murder Most Horrid (1994), The Bill (2002), Emmerdale (2006), Hollyoaks (2010–2011), Crime Stories (2012) and Holby City (2016).

== Personal life and death ==
Hale married actor John Forgeham in 1964, but they later divorced. (Note: England and Wales Marriage Registration Index lists Hale and Forgeham's marriage as being registered in 1964. An obituary for Forgeham published by The Guardian notes his subsequent remarriage in 1970.)

She died on 4 January 2024, aged 80.

== Filmography ==
=== Film ===
Year	Title	Role	Notes
1971	The Devils	Phillippe Trincant	
1971	The Boy Friend	Fay	
1971	Eagle in a Cage	Betsy Balcombe	
1973	The Love Ban	Joyce	
1974	Butley	Carol Heasman	
1974	Mahler	Alma Mahler	BAFTA Film Award for Newcomer to Leading Film Roles
1975	Lisztomania		Uncredited appearance
1976	Voyage of the Damned	Lotte Schulman	
1977	Valentino		Uncredited appearance
1978	Sweeney 2	Switchboard Girl	
1979	The World Is Full of Married Men	Lori Grossman	
1980	The Watcher in the Woods	Young Mrs Aylwood	
1980	McVicar	Kate	
1981	The French Lieutenant's Woman	Actress at Wrap Party	
1981	Waiting Room	The Woman	Short film
1986	Castaway	Sister Saint Margaret	
1988	Dogplant	Professor	Short film
1991	A Future in Fish	Mother	Short film
1994	Beyond Bedlam	Sister Romulus	
1995	Jackson: My Life... Your Fault	Josephine	
1997	Preaching to the Perverted	Miss Wilderspin	
1998	Gamal Abd El Naser	Lady Eden	
2002	AKA	Elizabeth of Lithuania	
2003	Photo Finish	Therapist	
2005	Mrs Palfrey at the Claremont	Shirley Burton	
2012	Cockneys vs Zombies	Doreen	
2015	Angel	Iris	

=== Television ===
Year	Title	Role	Notes
1966	Way off Beat	Jill	The Wednesday Play
1967	Cross My Heart and Hope She'll Die	Ruth	Drama '67
1967	Strike Pay	Maud Wharmby	ITV Play of the Week: Stories of D.H. Lawrence
1968	The Judge	Pat Dean	ITV Playhouse
1968	Camille 68	Nanine	ITV Playhouse
1969	The Back of Beyond	Enid Clarke	W. Somerset Maugham (BBC series)
1969	Men of Iron	Mary Ann	Play of Today (BBC)
1970	Special Branch	Lisa	Episode: "Love from Doris"
1970	Menace	The Girl	Episode: "Who's Been Sleeping in My Bed?"
1971–1972	Budgie	Jean	3 episodes
1972	The Strauss Family	Lili Dietrich	Episode: "Lili"
1973	A.D.A.M.	Jean Empson	ITV Sunday Night Theatre
1973	Only Make Believe	Sandra George	Play for Today (BBC)
1974	Electra	Chrysothemis	Play of the Month (BBC)
1974	Notorious Woman	Solange Dudevant-Sand	2 episodes
1974	Occupations	Polya	
1974	Affairs of the Heart	Lola Skinner	Episode: "Adela"
1975	Plaintiffs and Defendants	Joanna	Play for Today
1975	Two Sundays	Hilary	Play for Today
1975	Children of the Sun	Fran	Play for Today
1975	Upstairs, Downstairs	Violet Marshall	Episode: "An Old Flame"
1975	Affairs of the Heart	Daisy Miller	Episode: "Daisy"
1976	The Author of Beltraffio	Beatrice Ambient	
1976	East Lynne	Afy Halljohn	
1976–1977	Yes, Honestly	Georgina	2 episodes
1977	The Late Wife	Andrea	ITV Sunday Night Drama
1977	Jubilee	Alice Moore	Episode: "Street Party"
1978	The Seagull	Masha	Play of the Month
1980	Minder	Renee	Episode: "The Beer Hunter"
1980	Lady Killers	Ruth Ellis	Episode: "Lucky, Lucky Thirteen"
1980	Hammer House of Horror	Stella	Episode: "The Mark of Satan'"
1981	Eden End	Lilian Kirby	Celebrity Playhouse
1987	Boon	Alison	Episode: "A Fistful of Pesetas"
1988	Doctor Who	Daisy K	The Happiness Patrol, episodes 1, 2 and 3
1988	Gems	Lynne	36 episodes
1988	South of the Border	Joan Hartley	Episode 1.3
1989	Murder by Moonlight	Allison Quinney	TV film
1990	T-Bag and the Pearls of Wisdom	Tabatha Bag	10 episodes
1990	One Foot in the Grave	April Bluett	Episode: "Love and Death"
1990	T-Bag's Christmas Ding Dong	Tabatha Bag	
1991	T-Bag and the Rings of Olympus	Tabatha Bag	10 episodes
1991	Magic	Andrea Watson	
1991	T-Bag's Christmas Turkey	Tabatha Bag	
1992	The Count of Solar	Countess Solar	Screen Two
1992	T-Bag and the Sunstones of Montezuma	Tabatha Bag	10 episodes
1992	After the Dance	Moya Lexington	Performance
1992	Take off with T-Bag	Tabatha Bag	10 episodes
1992	Six Characters in Search of an Author	Leading Actress	Performance
1993	The Detectives	Irene Mazola	Episode: "Strangers in Paradise'"
1994	Murder Most Horrid	Lady Jamieson	Episode: "A Severe Case of Death"
1994	The Bill	Julie Stone	2 episodes
1994	The Honeymoon's Over	Norma	Sitcom pilot for BBC Two
1995	Treasure Island	Mrs. Hawkins	TV film
1995	Crown Prosecutor	Maureen Sherman	1 episode
1998	A Rather English Marriage	Sabrina's Maid	TV film
2000	Casualty	Janet Henbury	Episode: "Choked"
2002	Trial & Retribution V	Tammy Delaney	Episode: "Part 1"
2002	The Bill	Marilyn Costello	3 episodes
2002	Hell on Earth: The Desecration and Resurrection of 'The Devils'	Herself	Documentary
2005	Murder Investigation Team	Woman	Episode: "Professional'"
2006	Emmerdale	Beryl Chugspoke	8 episodes
2006	Budgie's Birds	Herself	Documentary
2007	The Commander	Vivienne Littlewood	Episode: "The Devil You Know"
2007	T-Bag: The Reunion Documentary	Herself	Documentary
2010–2011	Hollyoaks	Blanche Longford	7 episodes
2012	Crime Stories	Sally Woods	Episode: "Family"
2016	Holby City	Serephina Moore	Episode: "On the Ropes"

== Stage ==
Year	Title	Role	Venue	Ref
1965	The Comedy of Errors		Royal Shakespeare Theatre	
1965–1966	The Jew of Malta		Aldwych Theatre	
1966	The Knight of the Burning Pestle	Luce	Marlowe Theatre	
1966	Tamburlaine	Anippe	Marlowe Theatre	
1967	Gigi	Gigi	Liverpool Playhouse	
1967	Romeo and Juliet	Juliet	Liverpool Playhouse	
1975	Pygmalion	Eliza Doolittle	Thorndike Theatre	
1976	The Seagull	Nina	Derby Playhouse and Duke of York's Theatre	
1978	The Tribades	Marie Caroline David	Hampstead Theatre	
1978	Boo Hoo	Melanie	Open Space Theatre	
1979–1980	Last of the Red Hot Lovers	Bobbi Michele	Royal Exchange, Manchester and Criterion Theatre	
1981–1982	Steaming	Josie	Theatre Royal Stratford East and Comedy Theatre	
1982	Summit Conference	Clara Petacci	Lyric Theatre	
1982	Star Quality		Theatre Royal, Bath	
1983–1984	Lovers Dancing	Cheryl	Noël Coward Theatre	
1984–1985	Phèdre	Aricia	The Old Vic	
1985	Copperhead	Lucille	Bush Theatre	
1986–1987	The Women	Crystal Allen	Yvonne Arnaud Theatre and The Old Vic	
1988	Ear, Nose & Throat	Mavis	Theatre Royal, Brighton	
1990–1991	Mourning Becomes Electra	Lavinia Mannon	Citizens Theatre	
1993–1994	Absurd Person Singular	Marion Brewster-Wright	Theatre Royal, Bath	
1994	The Milk Train Doesn't Stop Here Anymore	The Witch of Capri	Citizens Theatre	
1997	Life Support	Gwen	Aldwych Theatre	
2000	The Guardsman	Mother	Noël Coward Theatre	
2001	Semi-Monde	Suzanne Fellini	Lyric Theatre	
2002	Britannicus	Albina	Citizens Theatre	
2002	The Cherry Orchard	Madame Ranevsky	Citizens Theatre	
2003	Chéri	Mademoiselle Poussier	Citizens Theatre	
2003	Take a Chance on Me	Lorraine	New End Theatre	
2006	Endgame	Nell	Gate Theatre and Barbican Centre	

== Awards and nominations ==
Year	Award	Category	Nominated work	Result	Ref
1975	British Academy Film Award	Most Promising Newcomer to Leading Film Roles	Mahler	Won	
1981	Laurence Olivier Award	Best Comedy Performance	Steaming	Nominated	

== Notes ==
Awards and achievements
BAFTA Award
Preceded by Peter Egan for The Hireling	Most Promising Newcomer to Leading Film Roles for Mahler; 1974	Succeeded by Valerie Perrine for Lenny
