= Hollywood Wives (novel) =

1983 novel by Jackie Collins

- First edition (US)
- Author: Jackie Collins
- Language: English
- Genre: Novel
- Publisher: Simon & Schuster (US); HarperCollins (UK)
- Publication date: July 1983
- Publication place: United States
- Media type: Print (Hardcover & Paperback)
- Pages: 510
- ISBN: 978-0-671-47406-5
- Preceded by: Chances (1981)
- Followed by: Lucky (1985)

Hollywood Wives is a 1983 novel by the British author Jackie Collins. It was her ninth novel, and her most successful, selling over 15 million copies.

Hollywood Wives tells the stories of several women in Hollywood, ranging all the way from long-time talent agents and screenwriters to vivacious screen vixens and young, innocent newcomers.

After the novel's international success, it was adapted as a television miniseries by producer Aaron Spelling that aired on ABC in February 1985, which became one of the most successful miniseries of the 1980s.

Collins went on to pen several more "Hollywood" titled books, including Hollywood Husbands (1986), Hollywood Kids (1994), Hollywood Wives: The New Generation (2001), and Hollywood Divorces (2003). Although these further novels tend to be separate works rather than direct sequels, characters from the original Hollywood Wives have made brief appearances in them.

== Main characters ==
- Elaine Conti - a Bronx girl (née Etta Grodonski) turned Hollywood hostess who is desperate to stay at the top while her marriage to former screen sex symbol Ross Conti crumbles beneath her. Previously married to a plastic surgeon, prior to her marriage to Ross. She is a compulsive shoplifter who lives in Beverly Hills. Elaine is a woman ruthlessly driven to improve both her husband's career and her own standing within Tinseltown. She falls out with Karen over her brazen affair with Ross, but despite the flagrant and very public cheating, they remain a powerful couple.
- Marilee Gray (née Sanderson) - Elaine's close friend and the first wife of director Neil Gray. Daughter of Tyrone Sanderson, a powerful studio owner. She lives a life of leisure, paid for by her ex-husband's alimony, but is resentful of his latest wife, talented screenwriter Montana Gray.
- Karen Lancaster - the daughter of super celebrity George Lancaster. Also one of Elaine's friends, but that does not stop her from making a play for Elaine's husband Ross Conti. Karen later marries rock star Josh Speed, to George's dismay.
- Sadie LaSalle - a Hollywood casting agent and starmaker who was responsible for Ross Conti's stardom. Now one of the most powerful women in Hollywood, Sadie eventually discovers Buddy Hudson, but she still bears a grudge against Ross for leaving her after she made him a star and intends to get even.
- Ross Conti - a one-time screen legend, but now a faded Hollywood star. Ross is about to turn 50 and is without a viable career. Has an affair with Karen Lancaster which imperils his marriage to Elaine. His past with Sadie LaSalle is about to come back to haunt Ross in ways he never thought possible.
- Neil Gray - a top British film director and recovering alcoholic. Married to Montana and previously married to Maralee. His secret affair with screen siren Gina Germaine may cost him more than he could possibly know.
- Jason Swankle - a top interior designer who also runs a male escort agency which caters to lonely rich women. Buddy used to work for him, and may have to again.
- Bibi Sutton - another Hollywood society hostess and gossip. A former journalist from France, she was married to actor Adam Sutton. She is Elaine's friend who follows her lead without reservation.
- Montana Gray - a talented screenwriter who is determined to break the glass ceiling of Hollywood studios. She is Neil Gray's second (and current) wife. Her arch rival is producer Oliver Easterne, whom she constantly battles for creative control of her film, "Street People".
- Gina Germaine - already a successful movie star, but tired of being typecast with lightweight roles, she is willing to do anything to advance her career and be taken seriously as an actress. This includes blackmailing Neil Gray with whom she has an affair, but not even Gina is ready for the fallout.
- George Lancaster - a beloved Hollywood superstar and a contemporary of Ross Conti's but still successful. Happily married to Pamela, and father of Karen (from his first marriage) whom he has a strained relationship with.
- Oliver Easterne - an arrogant, abrasive, and devious Hollywood studio boss. Only interested in getting what he wants and not caring about the damage he does to people in his way. Arch enemy of screenwriter Montana Gray, whom he thinks she is infringing on big boy's turf, the world of moviemaking.
- Buddy Hudson - a young, aspiring actor and former hustler with ambitions of stardom regardless of his past life and his new bride. However, Buddy's former profession is nothing compared to the scandalous revelations that await him.
- Angel Hudson - Buddy's new wife. Her youth, beauty and innocence make her a target for some of Hollywood's more unscrupulous characters. Close friends of her boss at the beauty salon, Koko and his partner, Adrian. While she wants to support her husband, Buddy's attempts to forge a career often strain their marriage, which is not helped by the fact she is pregnant.
- Pamela Lancaster - the second wife of Hollywood star George Lancaster and the stepmother of Karen Lancaster. Though she and George love one another, they also insult one another mercilessly.
- Deke Andrews - a mentally deranged young man from Philadelphia, who makes his way to Hollywood to find his birth parents, leaving a trail of death and destruction in his wake. His arrival will cause shockwaves for various people in Hollywood.
- Det. Leon Rosemont - a Philadelphia cop who pursues Deke across the U.S. Married to Millie who doesn't approve of his unrelenting devotion to his police work.
- Koko - the flamboyant gay owner of a Beverly Hills beauty salon and Angel's boss and close friend. He lives with his partner Adrian, a paraplegic Vietnam vet, and offers Angel a solid friendship and a supportive shoulder while teaching her about Hollywood and its ways.
