= The World Is Full of Divorced Women =

1975 novel by Jackie Collins

The World Is of Divorced Women
- First edition
- Author: Jackie Collins
- Language: English
- Genre: Fiction
- Published: 1975
- Publisher: W. H. Allen & Co.
- Publication place: England

The World Is Full Of Divorced Women is the fifth novel by English author Jackie Collins, published by W. H. Allen Ltd. in 1975.

== Plot ==
In New York City, English journalist Cleo James finds her husband having sex with her best friend, and she knows it's time to end the marriage. In London, Muffin, the hottest nude model in town, finds her man wants more from her than she can give.
