= Poor Little Bitch Girl =

2009 novel by Jackie Collins

- First edition (UK)
- Author: Jackie Collins
- Language: English
- Series: Santangelo novels
- Publisher: Simon & Schuster (UK); St. Martin's Press (US)
- Publication place: United Kingdom
- Preceded by: Drop Dead Beautiful
- Followed by: Goddess of Vengeance

Poor Little Bitch Girl is the 27th novel by English novelist Jackie Collins. It was released on 4 October 2009 in the United Kingdom, and 9 February 2010 in the United States. The book stemmed from an idea that Collins was working on for a television series about heiresses entitled Poor Little Rich Girls. The series was ultimately never made and so she adapted the material for a novel.
