= Oscar Lerman =

American film producer (1919–1992)

- Born: September 7, 1919; Philadelphia, Pennsylvania, U.S.
- Died: March 2, 1992 (aged 72); Los Angeles, California, U.S.
- Occupations: Nightclub impresario and gallery owner, film producer
- Known for: Co-founder of Tramp
- Spouse: Jackie Collins (m. 1965)
- Children: 2

Oscar S. Lerman (September 7, 1919 – March 2, 1992) was an American nightclub impresario, theatre and film producer, and the second husband of British novelist Jackie Collins, from 1965 until his death in 1992, whom he persuaded to write. In 1969, he co-founded the famously exclusive members-only nightclub Tramp in London. In 1978–79, he was a producer of the films The Stud, The World Is Full of Married Men, and The Bitch, all based on his wife's books.

== Early life ==
Lerman was born on September 7, 1919, in Philadelphia.

== Career ==
In the 1950s, Lerman was a Broadway theatre producer in New York.

In 1968, he persuaded his wife Jackie Collins to write her first novel, The World Is Full of Married Men.

In 1969, Lerman opened the members-only nightclub Tramp in London's Jermyn Street which he co-owned with Johnny Gold and Bill Ofner. The opening night was attended by Joan and Jackie Collins, Michael Caine, Roger Moore, and Natalie Wood.

In the late 1970s he moved into films, producing The Stud (1978), The World Is Full of Married Men (1979), The Bitch (1979), and Yesterday's Hero (1979), all based on his wife's novels apart from Yesterday's Hero, for which she wrote the script.

== Personal life ==
In 1965, Lerman married the British novelist Jackie Collins, 18 years his junior, whom he had met on a blind date. They had two daughters together, Tiffany (born 1967) and Rory (born 1969).

== Death ==
Lerman died from prostate cancer in Los Angeles on 2 March 1992.

== Selected filmography (as producer) ==
- The Stud (1978)
- The World Is Full of Married Men (1979)
- The Bitch (1979)
- Yesterday's Hero (1979)
