= Vendetta: Lucky's Revenge =

1996 crime novel by Jackie Collins

- First edition (UK)
- Author: Jackie Collins
- Language: English
- Series: Santangelo novels
- Publisher: Macmillan Publishers
- Publication date: 1996
- Publication place: United States
- Media type: Hardcover
- Pages: 624
- ISBN: 978-0-06-101235-8
- OCLC: 37437192
- Preceded by: Lady Boss
- Followed by: Dangerous Kiss

Vendetta: Lucky's Revenge is a 1996 novel by Jackie Collins and the fourth in her Santangelo novels series.
