= Drop Dead Beautiful =

2007 novel by Jackie Collins

- First edition (UK)
- Author: Jackie Collins
- Language: English
- Series: Santangelo novels
- Publisher: Simon & Schuster (UK); St. Martin's Press (US)
- Publication date: 2007
- Publication place: United States
- Media type: Print (Hardcover, paperback)
- Pages: 516
- ISBN: 978-0-743-26804-2 (Paperback)
- OCLC: 71808226
- Preceded by: Dangerous Kiss
- Followed by: Poor Little Bitch Girl

Drop Dead Beautiful is a 2007 novel by Jackie Collins and the sixth novel in her Santangelo novels series. The story takes place in 2000.

== Plot ==
The story focuses on the character Anthony Bonar (Enzio Bonatti's grandson), who is seeking revenge against the Santangelo family as Lucky Santangelo is responsible for the deaths of his grandfather and father. Lucky's daughter - the rebellious teenager Maria, also known as "Max" - is arranging to meet up with a mysterious boy on the internet, in the hopes of making an ex-boyfriend jealous. However, the mystery boy turns out to be a middle-aged man named Henry, who has a hatred for Max's mother Lucky as she did not cast him for a movie which she developed a few years ago. On the day of meeting Henry in Big Bear, many miles away from her Bel Air home, Max meets the nineteen-year-old Ace.
