= J. W. Hallahan Catholic Girls High School =

John W. Hallahan Catholic Girls' High School
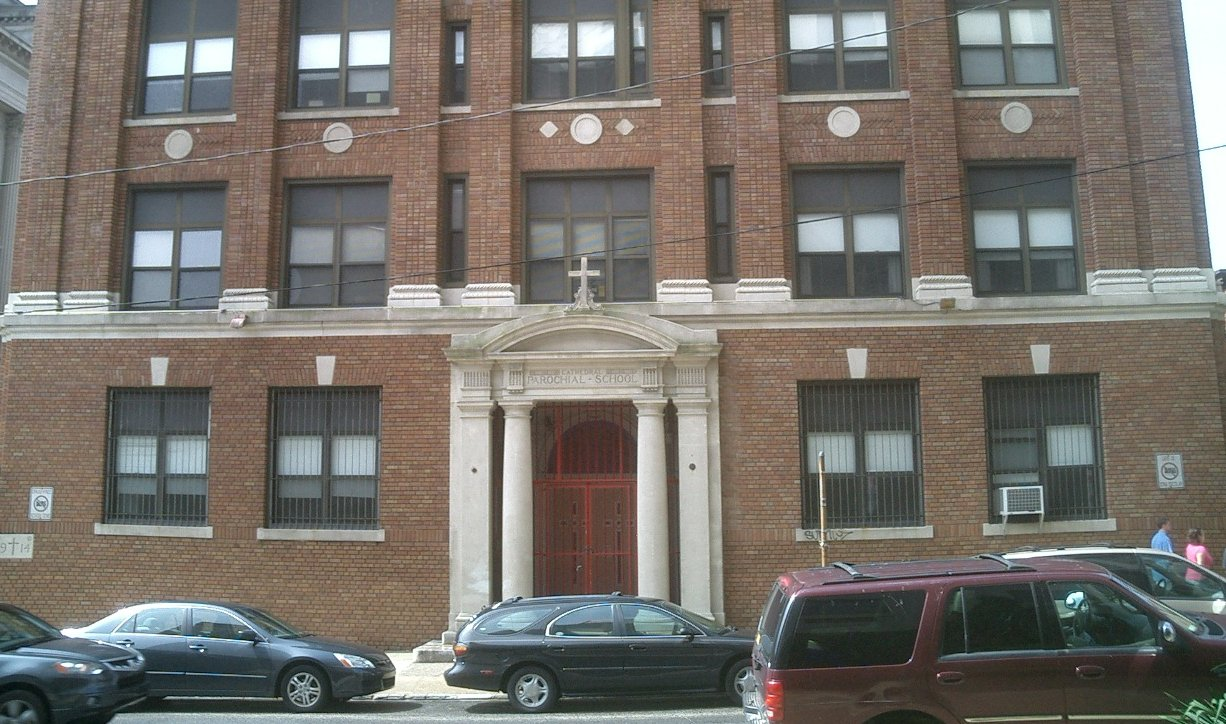
- Exterior, c. 2009

Location
- 311 North 19th Street; Philadelphia, Pennsylvania 19103; United States
- 39°57′36″N 75°10′12″W

Information
- Type: Private, All-Female
- Motto: "Women of Faith, Purpose, and Vision"
- Religious affiliation: Roman Catholic
- Established: 1901
- Closed: 2021
- School district: Archdiocese of Philadelphia
- President: Mrs. Denise Kassekert
- Principal: Michele B. Beachy
- Chaplain: Rev. Christopher Lucas
- Grades: 9-12
- Colors: Blue and White
- Song: "O' Girls of the Hallahan High" (alumni)
- Mascot: Mickey Mouse
- Accreditation: Middle States Association of Colleges and Schools
- Publication: Hourglass (Literary Magazine)
- Newspaper: Sand Script
- Yearbook: Silver Sands
- Athletic Director: Mike Gallagher
- Website: www.jwhallahan.com

John W. Hallahan Catholic Girls' High School was an all-girls Roman Catholic high school located in Philadelphia, Pennsylvania, United States, within the Archdiocese of Philadelphia. It is the country's first all-girls diocesan Catholic high school.

== History ==
A Roman Catholic High School for Boys had been established in 1890 at Broad and Vine streets through the philanthropy of Thomas E. Cahill, a Philadelphia merchant-entrepreneur. This school was a positive development for education in the city, but it was only benefiting the boys at the time. Girls had yet to have a Catholic School available.

"There is an urgent need for the establishment in the City of Philadelphia of a Catholic High School for girls," stated Father John W. Shanahan as found in the First Annual Report of the Superintendent of Schools for the Archdiocese of Philadelphia for the year ending June 30, 1895. In 1901, Father Philip R. McDevitt, who succeeded Father Shanahan, reported that High School Centres had been organized. There were five such Centres throughout the city. The religious community that served the parish school in which the Centres were located also staffed the High School Centre. There was, however, still the dream of a Catholic girls’ high school. Along with the dream, there was a prayer for a "Catholic Philanthropist:" to meet the necessity and to endow such a school.

The dream was realized in 1908, the centennial year of the diocese, when a devout Catholic lay woman, Mary E. H. McMichan, came forward to offer a gift of sufficient funds toward the establishment of such a school. The building's façade marks 1911 as the construction year. Since then, thousands of young women have attended.

From the beginning of the 20th century, Catholic Girls’ High School, the first Diocesan all-girls Catholic high school in the US, has welcomed "the daughters of the working-class families." These girls have been given the advantages of a quality secondary education.

At the request of Mary McMichan, in 1925, the school's name was prefaced with John W. Hallahan in honor of her brother.

Hallahan was granted permission in the mid-1930s to have Mickey Mouse, a registered Disney character, as a mascot. The tradition of jumping into the fountain at Logan Circle started in the 1970s and continued every year on the last day of the school year. The newly appointed Seniors, Juniors and Sophomores jumped into the Swann Memorial Fountain and attract the local media in Philadelphia.

In November plans were announced to close Hallahan at the end of the 2020–2021 school year.

== Notable alumnae ==
- Kim Delaney, American actress
- Kathleen Antonelli née Kathleen "Kay" McNulty, computer programmer, one of the programmers of ENIAC
- Kristen Thomas, American rugby sevens player
- Margie Duncan, American actress, dancer and studio director
