= Anne-Marie Johnson =

American actress and impressionist (born 1960)

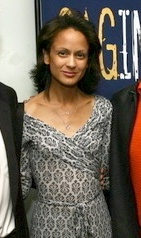
- Johnson in 2006
- Born: July 18, 1960 (age 66); Los Angeles, California, U.S.
- Education: University of California, Los Angeles (BFA)
- Occupations: Actress; impressionist
- Years active: 1979–present
- Spouse: Martin Grey (m. 1996)

Anne-Marie Johnson (born July 18, 1960) is an American actress and impressionist. She is best known for her roles as Lynn Williams on the NBC crime drama Hill Street Blues, Alieen Lewis on the sitcom Double Trouble also on NBC, Nadine Hudson-Thomas, Raj's wife on the What's Happening Now!!, a spinoff of What's Happening!!, Althea Tibbs on the NBC/CBS crime drama In the Heat of the Night, Alycia Barnett on Fox's Melrose Place, Sharon Upton Farley on the UPN sitcom Girlfriends., Liz Shelton on the TBS comedy-drama series, Tyler Perry's House of Payne and Dr. Patel on the soap opera Days of our Lives. She is also known as a cast member on Fox's In Living Color during its final season (1993–1994).

== Biography ==
=== Early life and education ===
Anne-Marie Johnson was born in Los Angeles, California. For high school, she attended John Marshall High School, graduating in 1978. Johnson graduated from the University of California, Los Angeles (UCLA) with a degree in Acting and Theater.

=== Career ===
Johnson's first US television appearance was as a contestant on the game show Card Sharks, which originally aired on June 5, 1979, and her name was listed as Anne Johnson. She appeared on the game show Child's Play under her full name as well as a pilot episode for the game show Body Language as Anne Marie Johnson, where she described herself as a "struggling actress". Johnson began her career appearing in episodes of the Australian dramas Homicide and Matlock Police in the 1970s. In 1984, she played the role of Aileen Lewis on the short-lived NBC comedy series Double Trouble, and at the same time had a recurring role on the NBC police drama Hill Street Blues.

She played Raj's wife Nadine Hudson Thomas in the syndicated sitcom What's Happening Now!! from 1985 to 1988. In 1988, Johnson began starring as Althea Tibbs in the NBC/CBS police drama series In the Heat of the Night, playing the role through 1993. While appearing on In the Heat of the Night, Johnson recorded the song "Little Drummer Boy" for the 1991 cast Christmas CD Christmas Time's A Comin'. Providing vocals behind her were the country gospel group The Marksmen Quartet. The song was produced by co-stars Randall Franks and Alan Autry. She also appeared in a number of films, including Hollywood Shuffle (1987), I'm Gonna Git You Sucka (1988), Robot Jox (1989), which featured her only career nude scene, The Five Heartbeats (1991), True Identity (1991), and Strictly Business (1991). On television, she played a leading role in the 1989 film Dream Date and starred as Carrie Jones/Carolyn Dimes in the 1990 miniseries Lucky Chances.

After leaving In the Heat of the Night, Johnson joined the cast of the Fox sketch comedy series In Living Color in its last season (1993–1994). She portrayed Alycia Barnett in the Fox prime-time soap opera Melrose Place from 1995 to 1996. From 1997 to 2002, she had a recurring role on the CBS series JAG as Representative Bobbi Latham. She also has made guest appearances on other TV series, including That's So Raven; Living Single; Murder, She Wrote; Leverage; Ally McBeal; Girlfriends; The Parkers; Dharma & Greg; CSI: Crime Scene Investigation; NCIS; Tyler Perry's House of Payne and Grey's Anatomy.

In 2019, she had a regular role in the short-lived NBC drama The InBetween and in 2020 had a recurring role in the Oprah Winfrey Network drama Cherish the Day and ABC legal thriller How to Get Away with Murder.

=== Other activities ===
Johnson was elected first national vice president of the Screen Actors Guild in 2008. She ran for president of the actors' union in 2009 on the Membership First ticket, but she lost to eventual winner Ken Howard.

== Personal life ==
Johnson was married once and has no children. Since January 1, 1996, she’s been married to Martin Grey. <- Her marriage to Martin Grey checks on Google with no evidence of divorce or separation, but tis statement is confusing. Is it implying she was married once BEFORE Martin and Martin is a second marriage, or that Martin and Anne-Marie are divorced? This needs clarity.

== Filmography ==
=== Film ===
Year	Title	Role	Notes
1987	Hollywood Shuffle	Lydia / Willie Mae / Hooker #5	
1988	I'm Gonna Git You Sucka	Cherry	
1989	Robot Jox	Athena	
1991	The Five Heartbeats	Sydney Todd	
1991	True Identity	Kristi	
1991	Strictly Business	Diedre	
1998	Down in the Delta	Monica Sinclair	
2001	Pursuit of Happiness	Devin Quinn	
2001	Apartment 12	Yvette	
2010	Suicide Dolls	Maria	
2011	About Fifty	Erin	
2012	Freeloaders	Lydia	
2014	Knock 'em Dead	Alex Hart	
2015	Double Daddy	Ms. Wolk	
2015	Sister Code	Mama Layne	
2019	Adopt a Highway	Tracy Westmore	

=== Television ===
Year	Title	Role	Notes
1984	High School U.S.A.	Beth Franklin	Unsold pilot
1984	Diff'rent Strokes	Denise	Episode: "Undercover Lover"
1984–1985	Double Trouble	Aileen Lewis	3 episodes
1984–1985	Hill Street Blues	Lynn Williams	4 episodes
1985–1988	What's Happening Now!!	Nadine Hudson Thomas	Main role (66 episodes)
1986	Hunter	Isabel Teret / Nella Watkins	Episode: "Saturday Night Special"
1988–1993	In the Heat of the Night	Althea Tibbs	Main role (109 episodes)
1989	Dream Date	Donna	Television film
1990	Lucky Chances	Carrie Jones / Carolyn Dimes	Miniseries
1990	Singer & Sons	Felicity Patterson	Episode: "Once Bitten"
1992	The Larry Sanders Show	Barbara Kirsch	Episode: "The Guest Host"
1993–1994	In Living Color	Various characters	Main role (24 episodes)
1994	Living Single	Sheila Kelly	Episode: "What's Next?"
1994	Babylon 5	Mariah Cirrus	Episode: "The Long Dark"
1995	Sirens	Christine	Episode: "Color Blind"
1995	Murder, She Wrote	Priscilla Dauphin	Episode: "Big Easy Murder"
1995–1996	Melrose Place	Alycia Barnett	14 episodes
1996–1997	Spider-Man: The Animated Series	Angela / Mousie	Voice, 3 episodes
1997	Asteroid	Karen Dodd	Television film
1997	Smart Guy	Ms. Williams	Pilot
1997–2002	JAG	Rep. Bobbi Latham	18 episodes
1998	Any Day Now	Aisha Bullock	Episode: "Making Music with the Wrong Man"
1998	The Pretender	Lt. Alison Fawkes	Episode: "Once in a Blue Moon"
1999	Chicago Hope	Mrs. Jamison	Episode: "Vanishing Acts"
1999	It's Like, You Know...	Cabil	Episode: "Two Days in the Valley"
1999	Ally McBeal	District Attorney Foster	Episode: "Love's Illusions"
1999	Hope Island	Dr. Karen Dunbar	Episode: "You Can't Look at the Sea Without Wishing for Wings"
2000	Happily Ever After: Fairy Tales for Every Child	Verena	Voice, episode: "The Frog Princess"
2000	Chicken Soup for the Soul	Elaine	Episode: "A Pearl of Great Value"
2000	For Your Love	Dr. Brown	Episode: "The Shrink Gets Shrunk"
2000	The X-Files	Vicky Wells	Episode: "Redrum"
2001	Strong Medicine	Nurse Doreen Collins	Episode: "Gray Matter"
2001	The Parkers	Lady Egyptian	Episode: "Nobody's Fool"
2001	The District	Renee Sawyer	Episode: "Rage Against the Machine"
2002	Dharma & Greg	Laura	Episode: "The Mamas and the Papas: Part 1"
2002	Through the Fire	Anne-Marie	Television film
2003	The System	Ms. Kimberly Trotter	9 episodes
2003	The District	Rita Douglas	Episode: "Criminally Insane"
2003	What I Like About You	Olivia	Episode: "Loose Lips"
2003	The Division	Martha	Episode: "Castaways"
2004	Rock Me, Baby	Ms. Watson	Episode: "I Love You, You Don't Love Me"
2003–2004	Girlfriends	Sharon Upton Farley	Recurring Cast: Season 3
2006	That's So Raven	Donna Cabonna	Recurring Cast: Season 4
2007	CSI: Crime Scene Investigation	ADA Jasmine Davis	Episode: "Leaving Las Vegas"
2007	Bones	Dr. Jasper	Episode: "Death in the Saddle"
2007	NCIS	Marine Col. Stacey Radcliffe	Episode: "Requiem"
2007–2010	Tyler Perry's House of Payne	Liz Shelton	4 episodes
2008	Boston Legal	Vivian Stewart	Episode: "Juiced"
2009	The Secret Life of the American Teenager	Baby Shop Person	1 episode
2009	Uncorked	Debra Miller	Television film
2010	I'm in the Band	Janet King	Episode: "Slap Goes the Weasel"
2011	Fairly Legal	Jennifer	Episode: "The Two Richards"
2011	Leverage	Darlene Wickett	Episode: "The Grave Danger Job"
2012–2016	Days of Our Lives	Dr. Patel	8 episodes
2014	Murder in the First	Emily English	Pilot
2014	Chasing Life	Arianna	Episode: "Blood Cancer Sex Carrots"
2014	See Dad Run	Principal Harris	1 episode
2015	Pretty Little Liars	Claire Handleman	Episode: "Bloody Hell"
2016	Childrens Hospital	Dr. Parker	Episode: "The Grid" (Parts 1 & 2)
2016	Grey's Anatomy	Judge	Episode: "Mama Tried"
2016	Castle	Mrs. Kramer	Episode: "Hell to Pay"
2016	Major Crimes	Jane Wolfe	Episode: "Present Tense"
2016	NCIS: Los Angeles	Doctor Adams	2 episodes
2017	Wet Hot American Summer: Ten Years Later	Burkhart	Web series
2017	Wisdom of the Crowd	Patty King	1 episode
2018	Imposters	Gail, therapist	3 episodes
2018	For the People	Senator Knox	Recurring
2018	Reverie	Mrs. Trent	1 episode
2018	I Was A Teenage Pillow Queen	Suzanne	Television film
2019	The InBetween	Lt. Swanstrom	Main cast
2019	Dear Santa, I Need a Date	Mrs. Vaughn	Television film
2020	Cherish The Day	Dana Fisher	3 episodes
2020	How to Get Away with Murder	Kendra Strauss	2 episodes
2022	So Help Me Todd	Felicity	1 episode
2022	Raven's Home	Donna Cabonna	Episode: "Raven and the Fashion Factory"
