= Lucky Chances =

- Genre: Romance; Drama
- Based on: Chances; Lucky by Jackie Collins
- Directed by: Buzz Kulik
- Starring: Vincent Irizarry; Michael Nader; Anne-Marie Johnson
- Theme music composer: Billy Goldenberg
- Country of origin: United States
- No. of episodes: 3

Production
- Executive producers: Susan Baerwald; Jackie Collins
- Producer: William Peters
- Production locations: 380 South San Rafael Avenue, Pasadena, California; Ahmanson Mansion - 401 South Hudson Place, Hancock Park, Los Angeles, California
- Cinematography: Gayne Rescher
- Editors: David Beatty; James Galloway; Les Green; Susan Heick
- Running time: 272 minutes
- Production company: NBC

Original release
- Network: NBC
- Release: October 7 – October 9, 1990

Lucky Chances is a 1990 television mini-series written by Jackie Collins and based on her bestselling novels Chances and Lucky. It starred Vincent Irizarry, Sandra Bullock, Eric Braeden, Nicollette Sheridan, Anne-Marie Johnson, Phil Morris, David McCallum, Richard Anderson and Robert Duncan McNeill. It was directed by Buzz Kulik.

== Cast ==
Actor	Role
Starring
Vincent Irizarry	Gino Santangelo
Michael Nader	Enzio Bonnatti
Anne-Marie Johnson	Carolyn "Carrie Jones" Dimes
Eric Braeden	Dimitri Stanislopolous
Sandra Bullock	Maria Santangelo
Stephanie Beacham	Susan Martino Santangelo
Tim Ryan	Lennie Golden
Phil Morris	Steven Dimes
Shawnee Smith	Olympia Stanisopolous Golden
Alan Rosenberg	Costa Zennocotti
David McCallum	Bernard Dimes
Luca Bercovici	Santino Bonnatti
Richard Anderson	Oswald Duke
Leann Hunley	Eden
Harold Pruett	Dario Santangelo
Grant Show	Marco
Jimmie F. Skaggs	Whitejack
Audrey Landers	Marabelle
Charles Frank	Sen. David Richmond
Wendy Cutler	Jennifer Zennocotti
Jake Dengel	Pino Ferragami
Special appearance by
Mary Frann	Clementine Duke
Nicollette Sheridan	Lucky Santangelo
