= Dangerous Kiss =

1999 novel

- First US edition
- Author: Jackie Collins
- Language: English
- Series: Santangelo novels
- Genre: Romantic novel
- Publisher: Simon & Schuster (US); Macmillan (UK)
- Publication date: 1999
- Publication place: United States
- Media type: Print (hardcover)
- Pages: 624 pp
- ISBN: 0-684-85030-3
- OCLC: 37437192
- Preceded by: Vendetta: Lucky's Revenge
- Followed by: Drop Dead Beautiful

Dangerous Kiss is a 1999 novel by Jackie Collins and the fifth novel in her Santangelo novels series.
