= Lovekiller =

Lovekiller may refer to:

- Lovekiller (album), a 2010 album by Swedish singer Darin
  - "Lovekiller" (song), title track taken from the album above
- "Love Killer", a song by The Killer Barbies from their 1995 album Dressed to Kiss
