= Kim Delaney =

American actress (born 1958)

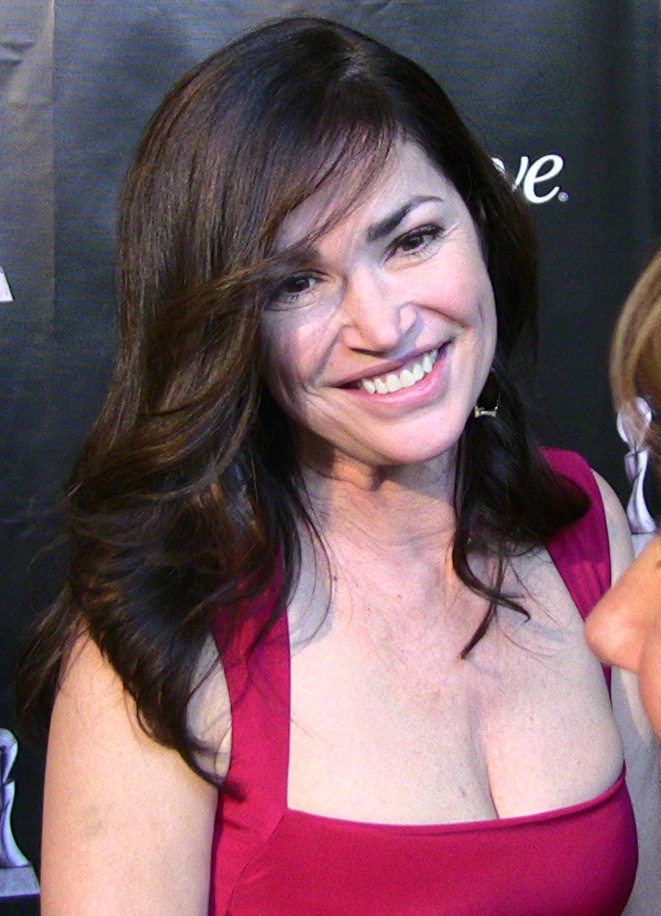
- Delaney at the 36th Annual Gracie Awards in 2011
- Born: November 29, 1961 (age 64); Philadelphia, Pennsylvania, U.S.
- Education: J.W. Hallahan Catholic Girls High School; William Esper Studio
- Occupation: Actress
- Years active: 1981–present
- Known for: NYPD Blue; All My Children; Army Wives; Tour of Duty
- Spouses: Charles Grant (m. 1984, divorced) Joseph Cortese (m. 1989; div. 1994) James Morgan (m. 2022)
- Children: 1

Kim Delaney (born November 29, 1961) is an American actress known for her starring role as Detective Diane Russell on the ABC drama television series NYPD Blue, for which she won an Emmy Award. Early in her career, she played the role of Jenny Gardner in the ABC daytime television drama All My Children. She later had leading roles in the short lived TV drama Philly, part of the first season of CSI: Miami, and the first six seasons of Army Wives. She also appeared in the second and third seasons as reporter Alex Devlin in Tour of Duty.

== Early life ==
Delaney, an Irish American, was born in Philadelphia, Pennsylvania, to Joan and Jack Delaney, the only daughter of five children. Delaney's mother was a homemaker and her father a senior union official in the United Auto Workers. She was raised Roman Catholic. Delaney has brothers Ed, John, Keith and Patrick. While she was attending J. W. Hallahan Catholic Girls High School, she worked as a model for the Elite agency. Upon graduation, she went to New York and found employment there as a model. At the same time, she studied acting with William Esper.

== Career ==
Delaney first became known for her stint as innocent teenager Jenny Gardner Nelson on the soap opera All My Children, which also was her first job. She played the character from August 1981 to August 1984, earning a 1983 Daytime Emmy Award nomination, as well as a loyal fan base; a profile of the actress a decade later noted,

"Delaney left the soap in 1984, but fans still remember her as Jenny. 'They come up and will say they've followed everything I've done, and they stopped watching the show after I left, and they're so happy to see me on NYPD Blue, because they love the character.'"

After leaving All My Children, Delaney began acting in feature films. In 1985, she appeared with Emilio Estevez in That Was Then... This Is Now, a film version of the S. E. Hinton novel of the same name. In 1986, she played a young nun in the military action movie The Delta Force, starring Chuck Norris. In 1987, Delaney was cast as Amanda Jones in Some Kind of Wonderful opposite Peter Gallagher, but new director Howard Deutch recast both roles with his future wife Lea Thompson and Craig Sheffer before filming. Also in 1987, she appeared both as Jessie in Christmas Comes to Willow Creek, and as associate attorney Leslie Kleinberg during the 2nd season of L.A. Law. In 1988, Delaney starred in the thriller The Drifter. In 1994, she appeared in the film The Force.

In 1988, Delaney became a regular on the CBS television series Tour of Duty. After leaving the show in 1989 to give birth to her son with husband Joseph Cortese, her character was killed in an explosion—just as her All My Children character had died five years earlier.

In the years immediately following her departure from her two early television series, her film and TV roles tended to be few and of low quality, in the opinion of both the critics and the actress herself. A 1996 profile article in Entertainment Weekly, on the occasion of her landing a prestigious television role at the end of this period, noted:

"Delaney's résumé is spotted with ridiculous roles that range from a nun in the Chuck Norris action movie, The Delta Force, to a possessed nymphomaniac in the soft-core horror film, Temptress. 'There's a lot of things I did to pay the mortgage,' Delaney says resignedly."

Roles from this period include her 1992 appearance as Lucky Santangelo in the television miniseries, Lady Boss.

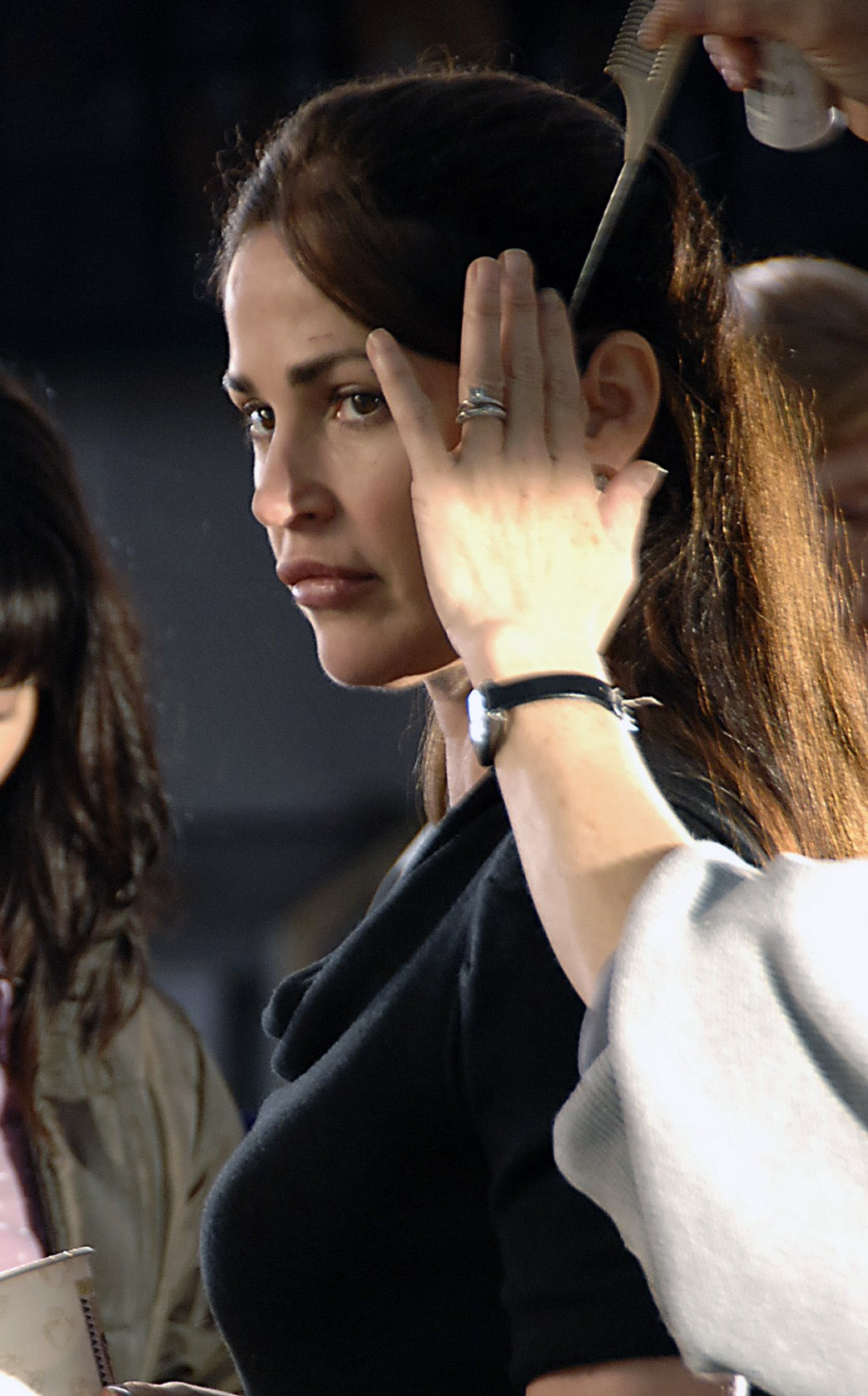
Kim Delaney in 2006

In 1995, Delaney began portraying NYPD Blue Detective Diane Russell. Originally slated for only four episodes, the role became permanent after her character's relationship with Detective Bobby Simone (Jimmy Smits) became a hit with viewers. In this role, she was nominated three times for the Primetime Emmy Award for Outstanding Supporting Actress in a Drama Series, winning at the 1997 Emmy Awards.

In 2001, NYPD Blue producer Steven Bochco chose Delaney for the lead in the new television series Philly and she was written out of NYPD Blue. Despite critical acclaim, the show lasted only one season.

In 2002, Delaney was the female lead on the new CBS drama series CSI: Miami, a spin-off of sorts from the hit CSI: Crime Scene Investigation. She was written off the series after just 10 episodes; Entertainment Weekly suggested that it had been due to a lack of chemistry between Delaney and star David Caruso.

After briefly returning in 5 episodes of NYPD Blue (one at the end of season 10 and a four-episode story arc mid-way through Season 11), Delaney starred in the 2004 NBC miniseries 10.5, and its 2006 sequel, 10.5: Apocalypse. The following year, she began a recurring role on The O.C. In 2006, Delaney starred in an episode of Nightmares & Dreamscapes: From the Stories of Stephen King titled "You Know They Got a Hell of a Band," about Rock and Roll Heaven. Delaney next appeared twice on Law & Order: Special Victims Unit in early 2007, guest-starring on the episodes "Philadelphia" and "Florida".

Delaney played the main role of Claudia Joy Holden on the Lifetime Television series Army Wives. In November 2012, a few weeks after the end of season six, it was announced that Delaney would not be returning for the show's seventh season, with a short storyline that her character had died.

In early 2016, Delaney was cast in God Bless the Broken Road, a feature film based on the song of the same name. It was released in the United States on September 7, 2018. In September 2020, Delaney joined the cast of General Hospital in the role of Jackie Templeton; she made her first appearance on October 6.

== Personal life ==
Delaney has been married three times and divorced twice. She married actor Charles Grant, also known as Charles Flohe, on July 22, 1984. She was married to actor Joseph Cortese from 1989 to 1994. They have a son named Jack, born circa 1990. She was engaged for a time to producer Alan Barnette. She married James Morgan on October 11, 2022.

Like her character in her breakout role on the television series NYPD Blue, Delaney has struggled with alcoholism. In 2002, Delaney was arrested in Malibu, California, for suspicion of drunk driving after she refused to take a breathalyzer test. She subsequently pleaded no contest and was sentenced to two years' probation, fined, and ordered to take a defensive driving course. In 2003, after being dropped from the cast of CSI: Miami, Delaney checked herself into an alcohol rehab center. In 2005, she lost custody of her 15-year-old son after endangering his life by forcing him to ride with her when she drove while intoxicated. Her son testified that this was not the first such incident. In 2011, Delaney was pulled from the stage before finishing a long, slurred, odd speech at an award ceremony recognizing the work of former United States Secretary of Defense Robert Gates.

In March 2025, Delaney was arrested and charged with felony assault likely to cause great bodily injury, following a domestic dispute with her husband, James Morgan. Morgan was also arrested and charged with misdemeanor domestic violence.

== Filmography ==
=== Film ===
Year	Title	Role	Notes
1983	First Affair	Cathy	
1985	That Was Then... This Is Now	Cathy Carlson	
1986	The Delta Force	Sister Mary	
1986	Hunter's Blood	Melanie	
1987	Campus Man	Dayna Thomas	
1987	Cracked Up	Jackie	
1987	Christmas Comes to Willow Creek	Jessie	
1988	The Drifter	Julia Robbins	
1988	Something Is Out There	Mandy Estabrook	
1988	Take My Daughters, Please	Evan	
1991	Hangfire	Maria Montoya Slayton	
1991	Body Parts	Karen Chrushank	
1994	The Force	Sarah Flynn	
1995	Project Metalbeast	Anne De Carlo	
1995	Darkman II: The Return of Durant	Jill Randall	
1995	Temptress	Karin Swann	
1995	Serial Killer	Selby Younger	Direct-to-video
2000	Mission to Mars	Maggie McConnell	
2004	Sudbury	Sally Owens	
2018	God Bless the Broken Road	Patti Hill	
2019	Tone-Deaf	Crystal	

=== Television ===
Year	Title	Role	Notes
1981–1984	All My Children	Jenny Gardner Nelson	Nominated—Daytime Emmy Award for Outstanding Supporting Actress in a Drama Series
1986	The Equalizer	Sally Ann Carter	Episode: "Unnatural Causes"
1986	Hotel	Marie Lockhart	Episode: "Forsaking All Others"
1987	Perry Mason: The Case of the Sinister Spirit	Susan Warrenfield	Television film
1987	L.A. Law	Leslie Kleinberg	4 episodes
1989–1990	Tour of Duty	Alex Devlin	18 episodes
1990	Tales from the Crypt	Gloria Fleming	Episode: "The Sacrifice"
1992	Lady Boss	Lucky Santangelo	Television film
1992	The Fifth Corner	Erica Fontaine	Television film
1993	The Disappearance of Christina	Lilly Kroft	Television film
1995	Tall, Dark and Deadly	Maggie Springer	Television film
1995–2003	NYPD Blue	Det. Diane Russell	137 episodes Primetime Emmy Award for Outstanding Supporting Actress in a Drama Series; Nominated—Golden Globe Award for Best Actress – Television Series Drama (1998–99); Nominated—Primetime Emmy Award for Outstanding Supporting Actress in a Drama Series (1998–99); Nominated—Satellite Award for Best Actress – Television Series Drama (1997–98); Nominated—Screen Actors Guild Award for Outstanding Performance by a Female Actor in a Drama Series (1997–99); Nominated—Screen Actors Guild Award for Outstanding Performance by an Ensemble in a Drama Series (1996–2000); Nominated—Viewers for Quality Television Award for Best Actress in a Quality Drama Series; Nominated—Viewers for Quality Television Award for Best Supporting Actress in a Quality Drama Series
1996	Closer and Closer	Kate Saunders	Television film
1997	All Lies End in Murder	Meredith 'Mere' Scialo	Television film
1997	The Devil's Child	Nikki DeMarco	Television film
2001	Love and Treason	Lt. Kate Timmons	Television film
2001–2002	Philly	Kathleen Maguire	22 episodes Nominated—Satellite Award for Best Actress – Television Series Drama
2002	CSI: Miami	Megan Donner	10 episodes
2004	Infidelity	Danielle Montet	Television film
2004	10.5	Dr. Samantha Hill	Television film
2005	The O.C.	Rebecca Bloom	5 episodes
2006	10.5: Apocalypse	Dr. Samantha Hill	Television film
2006	Nightmares and Dreamscapes	Mary Rivingham	Episode: "You Know They Got a Hell of a Band"
2007	Law & Order: Special Victims Unit	Captain Julia Millfield	2 episodes
2007–2012	Army Wives	Claudia Joy Holden	104 episodes
2011	Finding a Family	Ileana	Television film
2015	To Appomattox	Mary Todd Lincoln	Television miniseries
2016	Murder in the First	Dr. Nancy Redman	2 episodes
2017	Signed, Sealed, Delivered: Home Again	Kim Kellser	Television film
2018, 2022	Chicago Fire	Jennifer Sheridan	4 episodes
2020–2021	General Hospital	Jackie Templeton	Recurring role Nominated—Daytime Emmy Award for Outstanding Guest Performer in a Drama Series (2021)
2021	The Long Island Serial Killer: A Mother's Hunt for Justice	Mari Gilbert	Television film
