= Yesterday's Hero =

1979 British film by Neil Leifer

- Theatrical release poster
- Directed by: Neil Leifer
- Written by: Jackie Collins
- Produced by: Elliott Kastner; Oscar Lerman; Ken Regan
- Starring: Ian McShane; Adam Faith; Paul Nicholas; Suzanne Somers
- Cinematography: Brian West
- Edited by: Antony Gibbs
- Music by: Stanley Myers
- Production company: Cinema Seven Productions
- Distributed by: Columbia–EMI–Warner
- Release date: November 22, 1979
- Running time: 95 minutes
- Country: United Kingdom
- Language: English

Yesterday's Hero is a 1979 British drama film directed by Neil Leifer and starring Ian McShane, Adam Faith, Paul Nicholas and Suzanne Somers. It also features Glynis Barber and Emma Samms in early performances and Cary Elwes in his film debut. The screenplay was by novelist Jackie Collins, but was an original work and not based on one of her books.

== Plot ==
In England in the 1970s, former star football player Rod Turner is now an alcoholic and playing in non-League football. A Football League Third Division club, only referred to by its nickname "The Saints" [N.B. This is the real-life nickname of Southampton F.C., but none of the filming was done there], and owned by pop star Clint Simon, is having a successful run in the FA Cup and win their quarter-finals match. However, their star striker is injured, and, unable to find a suitable replacement player from another club, Simon has the idea of hiring Turner, his childhood idol, over the protests of team manager Jake Marsh. Simon approaches Turner and takes him on a trip to Paris, where Turner meets his old flame Cloudy, a singer who is making a record with Simon. Turner accepts the offer to play for his team and, after training with them, plays in the semi-final match which the team wins, but at half-time he is caught drinking in the dressing room by Marsh and is banned from playing in the final. After Cloudy takes him in after another drinking episode, Turner becomes torn between her and his current girlfriend Susan. Turner is on the bench in the final, but is brought on as a substitute and scores twice including the winning goal.

== Cast ==
- Ian McShane as Rod Turner
- Suzanne Somers as Cloudy Martin
- Adam Faith as Jake Marsh
- Paul Nicholas as Clint Simon
- Sam Kydd as Sam Turner
- Glynis Barber as Susan
- Trevor Thomas as Speed
- Sandy Ratcliff as Rita
- Alan Lake as Georgie Moore
- Matthew Long as Mack Gill
- Paul J. Medford as Marek
- Paul Desbois as Butch
- Eric Deacon as Chris
- George Moon as changing room attendant
- Jack Haig as Sam's crony
- Damian Elwes as disco dancer
- Cary Elwes as disco dancer
- John Motson as himself: TV Interviewer / commentator

== Production ==
For the final at Wembley Stadium, footage was used from the 1979 Football League Cup final between Southampton and Nottingham Forest, intercut with additional scenes containing the film's actors. To correspond with the real final footage, the fictional "Saints" players wore replica Southampton kits featuring yellow shirts and blue shorts, although some had incorrect details. In the crowd scenes, some of the "Saints" flags held by spectators include the word "Southampton".

== Release ==
The film had its world premiere at the Empire Leicester Square on 22 November 1979, opening to the public the following day. The film grossed £15,030 in its opening week from 4 cinemas in London, finishing third at the London box office.

== Reception ==
Variety wrote: "In departing from her well-trodden territory of penthouse frolics and highlife melodrama, and attempting a plotline where sex is merely incidental, writer Jackie Collins has come unstuck. Apparently deserted by her normally keen market judgement, she's failed to enliven a banal but potentially adequate narrative with any of her customary edge. ... Suzanne Somers alone overcomes Neil Leifer's paceless direction and some downright yesteryear musical numbers with surprisingly gutsy characterization of a basically vaporous role – Nicholas' costar, who becomes unhappily involved with McShane. But given the film's undistinguished technical credits, and passe concepts of glamor and emotional conflict, she can do little to offset the prevailing dullness."

Time Out wrote: "Jackie Collins' script is a paste job of scandal-sheet sports page headlines (boozing striker, hard-line manager, rock star chairman), while US sports photographer Leifer works backwards from footage of the Southampton-Nottingham Forest League Cup Final to give a hilarious sense of skewed felicity to the comic strip giant-killing progress of The Saints and their repentant super-sub sinner. John Motson commentates. Irresistibly bad."

Leslie Halliwell wrote "Totally uninteresting sporting version of The Road to Ruin."

The Radio Times Guide to Films gave the film 1/5 stars, writing: "The end result of this Jackie Collins-scripted effort is strictly fourth division."

== See also ==
- List of association football films
