= Lovehead =

1974 novel by Jackie Collins

Cover of the first edition, prior to the name change

Lovehead was the fourth novel from English author Jackie Collins, first published in 1974 by W. H. Allen. It went under a name change in 1989 and is now known and published as The Love Killers.

== Plot ==
Margaret Lawrence Brown, female rights activist and feminist, has taken up the cause of prostitutes to get them off the streets. While delivering a speech at Central Park she is assassinated. Rio Java, a former underground film star with four kids and no husband had been saved from a life of porn films and is now a staunch supporter. After the assassination Rio gets together with Margaret's two half-sisters, Lara Crichton and Beth Lawrence Brown, to plan revenge on Enzio Bassalino, head of an all-powerful mafia clan. Unhappy with the hookers leaving the streets and going on strike, he had a hit put out on Margaret. The three women decide to go about with their revenge by targeting Enzio's three sons: Frank, Nick and Angelo Bassalino. Their weapon: sex. The result: a bloodbath of sexual mayhem through the dangerous corridors of organised crime.

== Reception ==
She magazine called it "Sensational, bitter, completely compulsive...". Reviews were strong for Collins fourth novel. Unlike anything she'd ever done up until then and different somewhat from anything she'd done since. This would be Collins first foray into the world of the Mafia, a subject matter which she later chronicled in her future novels. On the novel's basis Collins said many years later: "its funny, what happened in the book ended up happening six months later. The hookers in New York came out and went on strike. Reaching the bestseller list, solidified Collins position as "Queen of the bestseller", although she still hadn't made as much a name for herself in the United States as she would in later years.
