= Tramp (nightclub) =

Members-only nightclub in central London, England

Coordinates: 51.5082°N 0.1377°W

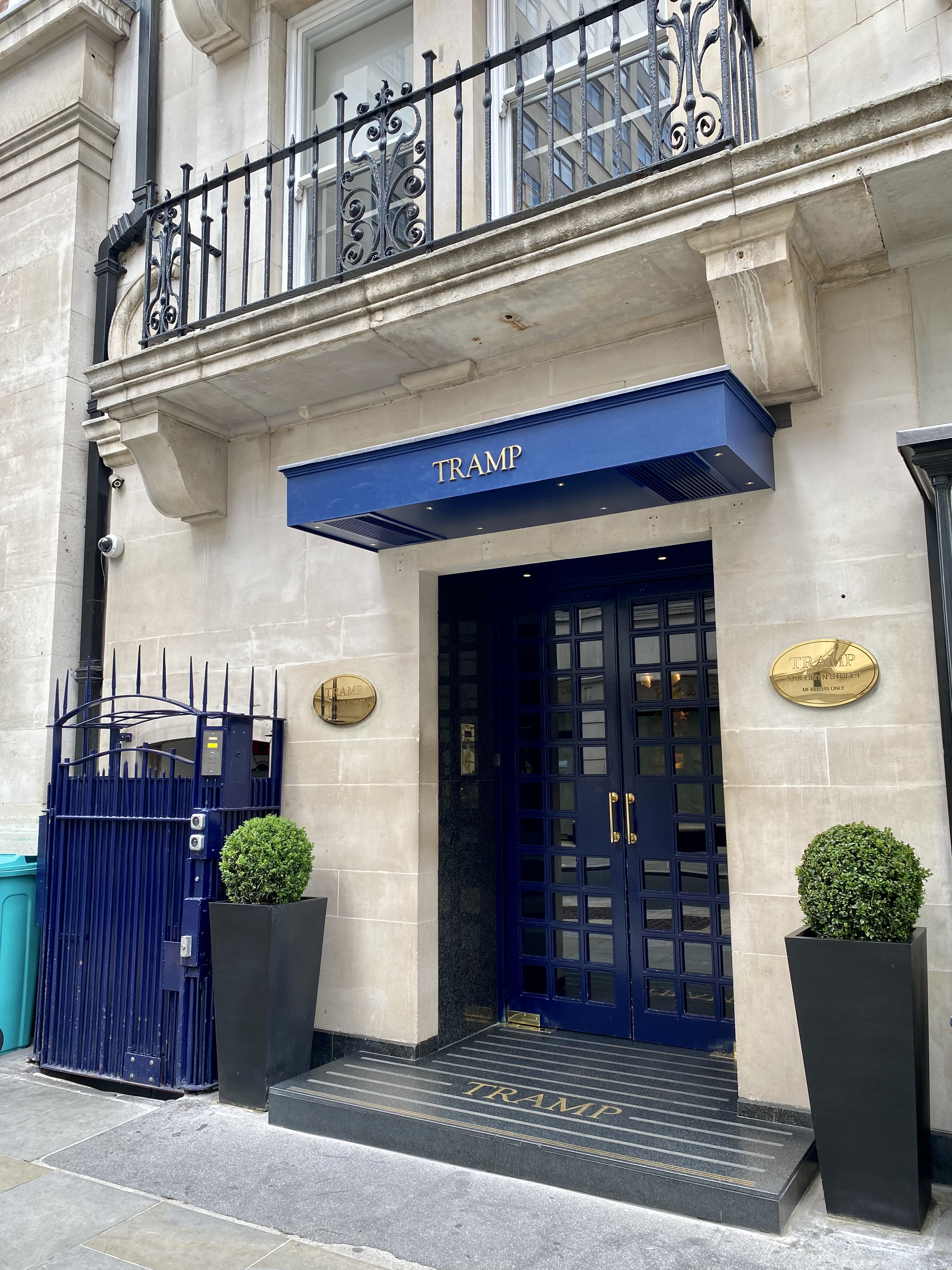
- Tramp at 40 Jermyn Street in May 2022
- Formation: 1969
- Founder: Johnny Gold, Bill Ofner, Oscar Lerman
- Type: Private members' club nightclub
- Location: 40 Jermyn Street, St James's, London, England
- Website: www.tramp.co.uk

Tramp is a private members club located on Jermyn Street in central London, England. It was founded in 1969 by Johnny Gold, Bill Ofner and Oscar Lerman.

The club built a reputation for discretion, banning photography and gossip writers from inside, and is popular with celebrities. Under the ownership of Luca Maggiora, an Italian hospitality entrepreneur, the club reopened in September 2024.

Tramp was especially popular with the British royalty, aristocracy, high society and the international jet-set in the 1970s and 1980s. The club is known to have been frequented figures including Princess Diana, Princess Margaret, Princess Anne, Grace Kelly, Roger Moore, David Niven, Joan Collins, Jackie Collins, Michael Caine, Peter Sellers, Jack Nicholson, Frank Sinatra, Mick Jagger, Ringo Starr, Keith Moon, Madonna, and Rod Stewart.

== History ==
Tramp was opened in December 1969 by Johnny Gold. It was owned by Gold, Bill Ofner and Oscar Lerman. The trio positioned Tramp as an alternative to the formal supper clubs which were then popular. They thought the club might survive for two or three years before its clientele moved on to another venue, and were surprised that it remained popular. The club was named after Charlie Chaplin's tramp persona. The club was outfitted smartly with oak panelling and chandeliers. The club had 300 founder members, all celebrities, who paid an annual fee of 10 guineas.

The sign at the entrance to Tramp

Gold banned all photography within the club and prevented paparazzi and gossip columnists from entering. Anyone who asked a guest for an autograph was also thrown out and Gold cultivated a reputation for discretion. When a newspaper described Tramp as a disreputable club attended by "tarty little pieces" Gold sued and won damages. Despite this, Gold was lenient with his regulars and rarely banned any. The Who's drummer Keith Moon was banned for a month after destroying a chandelier but Gold reduced this ban to 48 hours after Moon sent his chauffeur around with £500 in cash and phoned Gold, in tears, asking where else he would party. Members were sometimes permitted to run up large bar tabs; Moon's reached £14,000 at one point.

At one point the club played host to three James Bond actors; Sir Sean Connery, Sir Roger Moore and George Lazenby, who coincidentally were seated and dined together at the same time in the Zodiac restaurant.

In contrast to rival club Annabel's, Gold refused to apply a dress code at Tramp; Tara Palmer-Tomkinson famously attended her 21st birthday party there wearing only a bikini and fur coat. Men were not allowed entry unless accompanied by women.

Joan Collins was a member, and the nightclub scenes in The Stud, a 1978 film adaption of her sister Jackie Collins's 1969 novel The Stud, were filmed inside Tramp (Jackie Collins was married to Tramp's co-founder Oscar Lerman, he was one of the producers for the film, and the name of the club was likely inspired by the "Hobo" nightclub from The Stud which was published earlier that year). Gold thought he might have been the inspiration for the nightclub manager in the film. Gold established a Los Angeles branch of Tramp in the 1980s. In 1998, British businessman and racehorse owner Robert Sangster was interested in acquiring shares in Tramp. Gold sold his stake later that year to Caledonian Heritable, an Edinburgh-based property firm. Gold remained employed as "greeter-in-chief" until 2003 as he was the only person who knew the entire membership personally. There was some concern among members over the 2001 publication of Gold's memoir Tramp's Gold, but he maintained his discretion and it caused no scandal. The book's foreword was by long-time member Michael Caine.

After Italian hospitality entrepreneur Luca Maggiora purchased Tramp, he removed and reimbursed the members, before closing the club for renovation. It reopened over a year later in September 2024. It was revealed in the US Department of Justice release of 3 million Epstein files on 30 January 2026 that Jeffrey Epstein, Ghislaine Maxwell. and Prince Andrew, Duke of York, on 17 March 2001 met at Tramp along with an unidentified female who was 17 at the time. Andrew danced with this unidentified female during which he was described as "grabbing her waist". Prior to the release of these files. Virginia Giuffre had alleged that in March of 2001 she was trafficked by Epstein and taken to Tramp where she met Andrew. This is the occasion during which Andrew was described as "profusely sweating" by Giuffre; however, this was later denied by the disgraced royal in a Newsnight interview with Emily Maitlis.
