= Hollywood Wives (miniseries) =

1985 American television miniseries

- The main cast of Hollywood Wives
- Also known as: Jackie Collins' Hollywood Wives
- Genre: Drama
- Based on: Hollywood Wives by Jackie Collins
- Screenplay by: Robert McCullough
- Story by: Jackie Collins
- Directed by: Robert Day
- Starring: Candice Bergen; Joanna Cassidy; Mary Crosby; Angie Dickinson; Steve Forrest; Anthony Hopkins; Roddy McDowall; Stefanie Powers; Suzanne Somers; Robert Stack; Rod Steiger; Andrew Stevens; Catherine Mary Stewart
- Theme music composer: Lalo Schifrin
- Opening theme: "Hollywood Wives" by Laura Branigan
- Country of origin: United States
- Original language: English
- No. of episodes: 3

Production
- Executive producers: Aaron Spelling; Douglas S. Cramer
- Producers: Howard W. Koch; Robert McCullough
- Production locations: Saddlerock Ranch - 32111 Mulholland Highway, Malibu, California; Pasadena, California; San Marino, California; 28126 Pacific Coast Hwy., Malibu, California; Arden Villa - 1145 Arden Road, Pasadena, California; Los Angeles; Paramount Studios - 5555 Melrose Avenue, Hollywood, Los Angeles, California
- Cinematography: William W. Spencer
- Editors: Fred A. Chulack; Ray Daniels
- Running time: 3x90 minutes
- Production company: Aaron Spelling Productions

Original release
- Network: ABC
- Release: February 17 – February 19, 1985

Jackie Collins' Hollywood Wives is an American television miniseries based on the 1983 novel of the same name by Jackie Collins. Airing on ABC in February 1985, it follows several women connected to the entertainment industry in Hollywood and capitalized on the public's taste for opulent melodramas that dominated television ratings in the 1980s. The three-part, four-and-a-half-hour production was produced by Aaron Spelling, whose series Dynasty was number one in the ratings at the time. Like Dynasty, costume design was by Nolan Miller.

Collins herself was credited as "Creative Consultant" for the miniseries, though she later made it clear that she was not actually consulted at all during production and was less than enthusiastic about some of the casting choices. Collins was also disappointed with the depiction of some female characters, telling TV Times magazine that: “The script was written for television by a man, directed by a man, and produced by men – so the strength of women in the story was diminished.”

Hollywood Wives was nominated for an Emmy Award for "Outstanding Film Editing in a Limited Series or a Special" in 1985.

== Plot ==
=== Part 1 ===
Successful Hollywood movie star Gina Germaine (Suzanne Somers) has grown tired of her sex symbol image and is desperate to become a serious actress. Despite warnings of her talent agent Sadie LaSalle (Angie Dickinson), currently considered Hollywood’s most powerful in the field, to stick with her erotic blockbuster films, Gina sets her mind on a role in the newest film of well-respected film director Neil Gray (Anthony Hopkins). The script, Final Reunion, was written by his wife Montana Gray (Stefanie Powers) and is among the most speculated in Hollywood. Neil believes that the film could be a serious contender at the Oscars, but powerful Sanderson Studios boss Oliver Easterne (Rod Steiger) is determined to cast George Lancaster (Robert Stack), a still-loved veteran Hollywood superstar.

At a glitzy film premiere with Hollywood's royalty in attendance, George accepts an award for donating $250,000 to a hospital, much to the annoyance of his daughter Karen (Mary Crosby), who feels that her father is a hypocrite for his philanthropy while always having neglected his family. Karen is good friends with Neil’s ex-wife and daughter of the founder of Sanderson Studios, Marilee (Joanna Cassidy), who is rather jealous of Neil’s happy marriage to Montana. Another acquaintance is Elaine Conti (Candice Bergen), a Hollywood wife married to Ross Conti (Steve Forrest), an aging actor who was once the biggest star in Hollywood but is now struggling to get roles and is very insecure about his fading looks. Elaine is determined to help Ross become a big star again, but his career decline has put a strain on their marriage, and Ross is secretly sleeping around with young actresses as well as Karen. Nevertheless, Elaine puts in all efforts to getting her hands on the Final Reunion script and also starts planning a lavish Hollywood party to promote her husband. With the help of her well-connected friends, she prepares an impressive guest list, but all that matters to her is that Sadie will show up and sign Ross. However, Ross is not as hopeful as Elaine, since he was once signed with Sadie until he dropped her during the height of his fame.

After a meeting with Oliver Easterne, Neil travels to Palm Beach to sign George Lancaster for the male lead in Final Reunion, but instead finds Gina naked in his hotel room. Even though he is happily married to Montana, Neil sleeps with Gina, who then reveals her wish to be cast in his movie. Neil tries to make clear to her that she is unfit for the role and tries to brush her off. He returns to Los Angeles, where he tells Montana that George rejected the role because he was refused artistic control on the production. Gina, determined to get the role, continues her affair with Neil, going as far as covertly videotaping them together in bed and using it as blackmail to get a screen test. As the casting process continues, aspiring newcomer Buddy Hudson (Andrew Stevens) tries his best to acquire a role. Because he is not signed with any agent, no casting director is willing to give him an opportunity. Having previously worked as a male escort, his former boss Jason Swankle (Roddy McDowall) offers him his old job back, but Buddy has sworn off prostitution since marrying the beautiful and innocent Angel (Catherine Mary Stewart). Angel is worried about Buddy’s lack of stable income, especially after finding out that she is pregnant. After lying his way into a meeting with Montana Gray, Buddy almost obtains a part in Final Reunion, but when Montana like every other casting director tells him that he is nowhere without an agent, he considers returning to his old job.

Meanwhile in Philadelphia, an unstable young man called Deke finds out that his parents adopted him and that his biological mother is somebody important in Hollywood. He goes on a murder spree, first killing his adoptive parents and then hitchhiking his way to Hollywood, killing every driver who picks him up.

=== Part 2 ===
With the film Final Reunion now officially in production, Neil is pressured to test Gina for the female lead role, but Montana feels that she is unfit and refuses to consider her. As pressure intensifies, Neil’s behavior becomes more erratic, and Montana fears that he has started drinking again. Meanwhile, Elaine and Ross become more estranged from each other as Elaine starts to become more obsessed with organizing the perfect party while Ross distances himself from it and instead spends all of his time with Karen. Elaine confesses to Marilee that in the past she used to be bullied in high school for being overweight and was even raped by some boys there. She gave birth to a baby boy which she then put up for adoption, after which she fled to Hollywood to become a make-up artist. Elaine admits to Marilee that the incident has made her swear to never feel like a failure again, which is the reason why she is so afraid that her husband’s career might end. Marilee promises to help Elaine and organizes an impressive guest list.

Having failed to impress Montana, Buddy returns to his old job. His boss Jason sets him up in a lavish house in Malibu, which he and his wife Angel are allowed to stay at as long as he escorts wealthy women on dates. Angel soon grows suspicious of his mysterious meetings, but he assures her that nothing is wrong. Their days spent in luxury are cut short when Buddy refuses to spend the night with two older women, a decision that causes him to be fired and kicked out of the Malibu house. Just before they leave, Angel is discovered by Oliver Easterne while walking on the beach, who thinks that she is perfect for the female lead in Final Reunion. He finds out her name but she does not provide him her contact details as she is constantly harassed by men on the streets. Montana becomes agitated that the casting process has been quite difficult so far due to George Lancaster showing no interest as the male lead role. When Neil yet again mentions Gina for the female lead, Easterne warns him about the dangers of getting involved with the actress, revealing that he meets with her for intimate reasons too and knows she's a user.

On the day of the party, Elaine overhears an accidentally recorded voice message conversation between Ross and Karen in which their affair is revealed. Feeling crushed, she heads to town and starts a shoplifting spree, until she is caught stealing a necklace at Gucci. The shop owner refuses to release her until she can identify herself as Ross Conti’s wife. Desperate, she phones Karen and reveals that she knows about the affair. Elaine is unable, however, to contact Ross directly, as he has already left Karen’s house and is approached on the street by a private investigator (Joe E. Tata) who has taken photos of him with Karen and threatens to release them to the press unless Ross pays him $50,000. After the incident, he picks up Elaine from the store, after which she tells him that she knows about his adultery and once the party is over she is going to leave him.

Meanwhile, Buddy meets with an agent, Francis (Dorothy Dells), who invites him to Ross and Elaine’s party as her escort. He is excited to share the news with Angel but cannot reach her as she, fed up with the poor living conditions at Buddy’s friend Randy’s (Stephen Shellen) place they are temporarily staying at, has left the apartment. Angel has since found a job at a hairdresser owned by Koko (James ‘Gypsy’ Haake) and is told by Randy’s girlfriend Shelly (Aleisa Shirley) that Buddy is cheating on her. Unaware that Shelly has lied to her, Angel feels heartbroken and accepts an invitation by Koko’s kind, elderly customer Mrs. Liderman (Meg Wyllie) to go with her to Ross and Elaine’s party.

Meanwhile, Deke arrives in Hollywood and buys a gun.

=== Part 3 ===
At Elaine’s party, Easterne disappoints her by announcing George Lancaster as the male lead in Final Reunion. Karen gets intoxicated and publicly displays her affection to Ross, which prompts George to scold her. Karen then reveals to George that she is acting out due to traumas of once having caught him sleeping with a 15-year-old girl. Ashamed, he apologizes and promises to be a better father to her.

Unimpressed with the social culture of Hollywood, Angel shocks everyone by rejecting Easterne’s offer to star in Final Reunion. Buddy, meanwhile, is offered a screen test by an intoxicated Montana. Excited by the opportunity, he offers to drive her home, and they end up spending the night together but platonically. Absent from the party are Gina and Neil, who are having sex at a hotel room when Neil suddenly suffers from a heart attack. He is hospitalized, and his affair with Gina becomes public information. Shortly after, Neil dies.

After the party, Elaine kicks Ross out of the house and turns to alcohol. Karen assumes that Ross will now choose to be with her, but he tells her that he will always remain Elaine’s husband. Karen then reveals that she is pregnant with his child and refuses to consider an abortion. After telling her that he is not married, Sadie agrees to turn Buddy into Hollywood's next big movie star on the condition that he remains unmarried so that she can promote him as a sex symbol. She parades her new client in front of Ross, and assures Ross that he will never become a star again. Buddy feels that Sadie used him to prove a point to Ross, and then realizes he is not willing to become a sex symbol or give up Angel. He abandons his career to save his marriage, and then visits his mother who reveals to him that he is not her biological son.

Meanwhile, Deke identifies Sadie as his mother and holds her captive in her own mansion. In the process, he shoots and wounds Ross, who arrived for a meeting with Sadie, and almost injures Angel. It turns out that Deke is the identical twin brother of Buddy. Sadie reveals that she gave up Deke and Buddy because they were the product of her affair with Ross. Buddy then arrives and shoots Deke in self-defense. Following the incident, Elaine formally leaves Ross, Deke is hospitalized, his fate uncertain and Sadie gets acquainted with her newly found son and Angel. Easterne announces Ross and Gina are the new leads of Final Reunion.

== Main cast ==
Candice Bergen as Elaine Conti
Elaine is a Detroit girl turned Hollywood hostess, desperate to stay at the top while her marriage to former screen sex symbol Ross Conti crumbles beneath her. She is driven to improve her husband's career and her own standing within Tinseltown, but struggles to keep her secret that she is also a compulsive shoplifter.

Joanna Cassidy as Marilee Gray
Marilee is Elaine's close friend. A wealthy Hollywood socialite, she is the daughter of a powerful studio boss and the former wife of film director Neil Gray.

Mary Crosby as Karen Lancaster
Karen is the daughter of superstar actor George Lancaster, whom she does not get along with. Although friends with Elaine, Karen begins making a play for Elaine's husband Ross Conti.

Angie Dickinson as Sadie LaSalle
Sadie is a Hollywood agent and star-maker who was responsible for Ross Conti's stardom in the 1950s, and is now one of the most powerful women in Hollywood.

Steve Forrest as Ross Conti
Ross is a fading Hollywood star, now in his fifties and without a viable career.

Anthony Hopkins as Neil Gray
Neil is a British film director. He is a recovering alcoholic and, although he is married to talented screenwriter Montana Gray, he is also caught in a seductive web with actress Gina Germaine.

Roddy McDowall as Jason Swankle
Jason is a top interior designer who also runs a male escort agency which caters to lonely rich women.

Stefanie Powers as Montana Gray
Montana is Neil Gray's second wife. A talented screenwriter whose new screenplay Final Reunion is one of the most talked about scripts in town. She is determined to break the glass ceiling of the Hollywood studio system.

Suzanne Somers as Gina Germaine
Gina is a successful movie star, but is tired of her role as a Hollywood sex symbol and now wants to be taken seriously as an actress. She is willing to do anything to advance her career, including blackmailing movie director Neil Gray.

Robert Stack as George Lancaster
George is a beloved Hollywood superstar, a contemporary of Ross Conti's but still successful and in-demand; however, he has a strained relationship with his daughter Karen.

Rod Steiger as Oliver Easterne
Oliver is a Hollywood studio boss. Arrogant and abrasive, he cares only about getting box office results rather than artistic integrity.

Andrew Stevens as Buddy Hudson & Deke Andrews
Buddy is a young aspiring actor and former male prostitute with ambitions of stardom. Now married to Angel, he struggles to hide his past life as he attempts to make a career as an actor. Stevens also plays Deke, Buddy’s psychotic twin brother.

Catherine Mary Stewart as Angel Hudson
Angel is Buddy's new bride, trying to find her own way in a new town. Her beauty and innocence often makes her an easy target of the more unscrupulous residents of Hollywood.

== Ratings and reception ==
Part one, premiering on Sunday February 17, 1985, finished in 7th place for the week but was the top rated show for the night. It received a 22 rating and a 33 share. Parts two and three ranked 13th and 2nd the following week.

Washington Post TV critic Tom Shales facetiously wrote, "Hollywood Wives didn't get quite the ratings ABC thought it would; so network executives now are rethinking their entire programming policy. They're wondering, 'Maybe we should give the public decent, intelligent, tasteful television shows.'"

Although critical reviews at the time of broadcast were generally negative, the miniseries has attained an enduring popularity for its eclectic cast and kitschy excesses such as its "Baroque, operatic climactic scenes". It has been retrospectively appreciated as "full-scale televisual camp".

== Home media ==
Hollywood Wives was released on a double cassette home video in the 1980s. It was first released on DVD in 2014 in Region 2 (PAL) in certain European countries (Sweden, The Netherlands), and was released in Region 1 by Visual Entertainment in December 2015.

== International distribution ==
In the United Kingdom, the miniseries was acquired by and broadcast on ITV on October 28 and 29, 1985, with Parts Two and Three broadcast almost back-to-back on the latter evening. The final instalment's broadcast suffered from the loss of the third of four reels networked by Central ITV - the station that covers the Midlands area of England - to all but one other region, which led to seventeen minutes of the program being lost. Thames Television - covering the London area - broadcast the affected episode the following night due to their coverage of the Thames Telethon; they aired it intact, and consequently were the only region to transmit Part Three - and the miniseries - to completion.
