= Chances (novel) =

1981 novel by Jackie Collins

- First edition (US)
- Author: Jackie Collins
- Language: English
- Series: Santangelo novels
- Publication date: 1981
- Publication place: United Kingdom
- English publication date: Warner Books (US)
- Media type: Hardcover
- ISBN: 978-0-446-32943-9
- OCLC: 17347361
- Followed by: Hollywood Wives

Chances is a 1981 novel by Jackie Collins and the first in her Santangelo novels series. The novel has three focal points, two of them focusing on the main characters of the novel and a third during the New York City blackout of 1977. The novel made the New York Times Bestseller list upon its release.

== Synopsis ==
Chances is broken up into parts. The first part looks at the blackout in New York City and how this affects the main characters. The second is focused on Gino Santangelo and later includes his children Lucky and Dario. The third part examines the life of Carrie Berkley and later her son Steven.

=== July 14/15 1977, New York City/Philadelphia ===
The blackout, a real event that Collins describes in some detail, affects all the major characters either directly or indirectly.

- Lucky Santangelo was in Costa Zennocotti's office, trying to convince Costa not to let her father Gino Santangelo return to America; she does not know he is in a plane circling the city. When the blackout occurs she is trapped in an elevator between floors with Steven Berkley. The two end up talking and when they are rescued from the lift Lucky goes back to Steven's apartment for breakfast and a change of clothes.
- Steven Berkley, a district attorney, was in his friend Jerry Myerson's office working on an indictment for Enzio Bonnatti. He ends up trapped in the elevator with Lucky.
- Gino Santangelo was in a plane returning from a seven-year tax exile in Israel when the blackout occurs. His plane is diverted to Philadelphia when in a hotel, a flight attendant tips the press that he is back in the country.
- Dario Santangelo is trapped in his own apartment after his male lover takes his keys, his gun, and his knife. Dario is forced to phone Costa in order to escape alive.
- Costa Zennocotti stays in his office after the blackout, not willing to walk down all the stairs and Dario calls him and says that he needs something "arranged". Costa calls Sal, a freelance enforcer to take out the boy but ends up double-crossing him and kidnapping Dario.
- Carrie Berkley drives to Harlem in her Cadillac Seville to meet a blackmailer, during the blackout she is targeted by a gang of youths who assault her and strip her of her jewelry. She is arrested when she is in the area of the riots and looting, but her husband, Elliot Berkley bails her out. The next day, dressed more conservatively, she takes a cab back to Harlem having received another call from the blackmailer.

=== Gino and Lucky ===
Gino's story begins in 1921 but backtracks to narrate details of when Gino's parent's, Paulo and Mira Santangelo emigrated to New York City from Italy in 1909 when Gino was three. From an early age, Gino takes to a life of crime, stealing a car at the age of fifteen and ending up in a juvenile home.

== Main characters ==
- Gino Santangelo
- Lucky Santangelo
- Dario Santangelo
- Carrie Berkley
- Steven Berkley
