= The World Is Full of Married Men =

1968 novel by Jackie Collins

The World is Full of Married Men
- First edition
- Author: Jackie Collins
- Language: English
- Genre: Novel
- Publisher: W. H. Allen & Co.
- Publication date: 1968
- Publication place: United Kingdom
- Media type: Print (Paperback)
- Pages: 173
- ISBN: 0-446-35717-0
- OCLC: 22745957
- Followed by: The Stud

The World Is Full of Married Men is the debut novel of British author Jackie Collins, first published in 1968 by W. H. Allen & Co.

== Plot summary ==
Set in London in the Swinging Sixties, middle-aged advertising executive David Cooper cheats on his wife Linda. When he meets the young and beautiful Claudia Parker, David wants to marry her. However, Claudia has different ideas; she wants to be a model, an actress, and a star. When Linda finds out about the affair she ends the marriage and files for divorce.

At first protesting, David finally relents and moves into an apartment with Claudia. After six months however, the pair are sick of each other and now that the divorce is finalized, Linda has started seeing Hollywood film producer Jay Grossman. Realizing his mistake in letting Linda go, David fails to win her back and falls into an alcoholic stupor that renders him virtually impotent and only able to perform with his mousy spinster secretary, Miss Fields, who ultimately falls pregnant with his child.

== Reaction ==
Without a literary agent but with the strong support and encouragement of her husband, Collins sent off the manuscript to a publisher. By this time, Jacqueline Susann's similarly themed novel Valley of the Dolls (1966) had already become a huge bestseller and a hit film, and Collins' novel was accepted. Within a week of its publication, The World Is Full of Married Men made the best-seller list.

The book was banned in Australia, New Zealand and South Africa, but the scandal bolstered sales in the United Kingdom and the US. Collins' publishers at the time, W. H. Allen & Co., told her that unless she took the "four-letter words" out, the book would be banned in Australia. Collins proceeded in taking the four-letter words out and it was still banned in Australia. In reaction, Collins quipped, "What's the matter? Don't you have married men there?"

Romantic novelist Barbara Cartland called the book "nasty, filthy and disgusting", and charged Collins with "creating every pervert in Britain". When Collins sent a signed copy of the book to her father, Joe Collins, he stopped reading it after the first few pages. "Jackie's racy style was altogether too much for me", he later said and for the rest of his life he was never to read more than just a few pages of his daughter's racy pot-boilers. "I am not a prude", he said. "I'm thick skinned and broad-minded and hard to shock (but it is) distasteful for a father to read his daughter's descriptions of sex."

== Film adaptation ==
A film version of the novel was made in 1979, eleven years after the novel's publication. With a screenplay written by Collins herself, and co-produced by her husband Oscar Lerman, the film was made to capitalize on the success of The Stud and The Bitch, two of Collins' other novels made into films in 1978 and 1979. The film version was set in the late 1970s (as opposed to the novel's 1960s setting) and featured American stars Anthony Franciosa and Carroll Baker as David and Linda Cooper, and included Gareth Hunt, Anthony Steel, Paul Nicholas, Georgina Hale, John Nolan, Jean Gilpin, Alison Elliott, and Stephanie Marrian, the Sun Newspaper's first page 3 girl in supporting roles. Newcomer Sherri Lee Cronn was cast (as Claudia Parker) in her first and only role.

Due to its setting, the film made much use of disco music and even featured an appearance by famed dance troupe Hot Gossip. The Welsh singer Bonnie Tyler had a UK Top 40 hit with the title track to the film, and also appeared in the film, performing the song during the opening credits. The song was also recorded by the American singer Bette Midler the same year.

The film version grossed $977,326 in the US.
