= Hollywood Wives: The New Generation =

2003 American made-for-television film

- Promotional photo featuring its main cast and the writer
- Genre: Drama
- Based on: Hollywood Wives: The New Generation by Jackie Collins
- Written by: Nicole Avril
- Directed by: Joyce Chopra
- Starring: Farrah Fawcett; Melissa Gilbert
- Music by: Mark Korven
- Country of origin: United States
- Original language: English

Production
- Executive producers: Jackie Collins; Renée Valente; Michael Jaffe; Tom Patricia
- Producer: Randi Richmond
- Cinematography: Derick V. Underschultz
- Editor: Geoffrey Rowland
- Running time: 93 minutes
- Production companies: Renée Valente Productions; Puma Productions; Voice Pictures; Patriarch Pictures Inc.

Original release
- Network: CBS
- Release: October 19, 2003

Hollywood Wives: The New Generation (also released as Jackie Collins' Hollywood Wives: The New Generation) is a 2003 American drama television film directed by Joyce Chopra. The film is based on the 2001 novel of the same name by Jackie Collins, which was a spin-off from the 1983 successful novel Hollywood Wives. It aired on CBS on October 19, 2003.

== Plot ==
The film focuses on a group of three Hollywood wives and their complicated lives. Lissa Roman is a very successful actress and musician busy promoting her latest blockbuster movie. She is fed up with her younger husband, Gregg Lynch, who seems to be interested only in her money and luxurious life style. Her two best friends include Taylor Singer and Kyndra Rossiter. Taylor is married to well known director Larry Singer. Frustrated that she is unable to have her big break, she has an affair with the much younger writer Oliver Rock. Lissa's other friend Kyndra is meanwhile enjoying a career as a soul singer, often described as a selfish diva. This has negative impact on the relationship with her daughter Saffron, an aspiring fashion designer and best friend of Nikki Roman, Lissa's daughter.

When assigned to private investigator Michael Scorsinni, Lissa finds out that her husband is cheating on her. When she arrives home and refuses to talk to him, he becomes angry, beating her up and raping her. After throwing him out of the house the next morning, she attends a dinner party of Nikki, who will marry Evan Richter in a month. She is glad to marry him, but she also has a secret crush on his brother Brian. She later kisses him at a night club, but immediately regrets the decision. Meanwhile, Lissa is bothered there by a man and eventually has to be escorted home by Michael. Gregg spots them walking together and suspects the worst. Later that night, Lissa notices that Gregg is spreading false rumours about her on national television.

The next morning, Taylor is offered the lead in a movie about a lesbian love story. Her husband Larry disapproves of the script and is annoyed by his wife's obsession with Hollywood. Always having aspired a normal life, he regrets that his wife does not interact well with people who are not familiar with Hollywood. Trying to prevent her from taking the role, he agrees to help her finally make her own movie. She is very lucky, until she finds out Oliver is assigned as her script writer. Larry soon finds out that she knew him before their meeting and suspects that they are having an affair. Meanwhile, Nikki gets kidnapped. Saffron and Brian are worried by her disappearance, but Evan does not really care, as he is too busy with his mistress.

After the premiere of her latest movie, Lissa spends the night with Michael. They are interrupted by the message of Nikki's abduction. The kidnapper, a poor man who was angry that Lissa received a salary of $15,000,000 for one movie, demands $5,000,000. As she hands him the money, he runs away, without Nikki anywhere to be seen. Michael eventually saves the day, by catching the kidnapper and locating Nikki. In the end, Lissa promises Nikki that she will spend more time with her. Nikki ends her engagement with Evan to marry Brian. Larry finds out about Taylor's affair with Oliver and files for divorce, after which she decides to take the role in the movie about lesbians after all. Kyndra shows Saffron for the first time how much she cares about her.

== Cast ==
- Farrah Fawcett as Lissa Roman
- Melissa Gilbert as Taylor Singer
- Robin Givens as Kyndra Rossiter
- Dorian Harewood as Claude St. Claire
- Jeff Kaake as Gregg Lynch
- Stewart Bick as Larry Singer
- Kandyse McClure as Saffron
- Robert Moloney as Eric Vernon
- Pascale Hutton as Nikki Roman
- Jack Scalia as Michael Scorsinni
- Peter Cockett as James Pierson
- Peter Oldring as Danny
- Eric Johnson as Brian Richter
- James Thomas as Evan Richter
- Dallas La Porta as Oliver Rock

== Production ==
Originally, pop singer Christina Aguilera was to make a cameo appearance in the film. In July 2003, it was announced that she was offered a role of a 'sweet character', but she insisted to play a villain instead. Filming began a month later in Calgary. The movie was released without Aguilera in it.
