= Jackie Collins =

English novelist (1937–2015)

Jackie Collins OBE
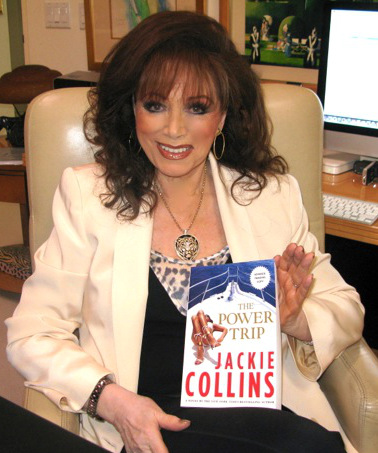
- Collins in 2012
- Born: Jacqueline Jill Collins; 4 October 1937; Hampstead, London, England
- Died: 19 September 2015 (aged 77); Beverly Hills, California, U.S.
- Resting place: Westwood Village Memorial Park Cemetery
- Occupations: Novelist, actress
- Spouses: Wallace Austin (m. 1960; div. 1964) Oscar Lerman (m. 1965; died 1992)
- Partner: Frank Calcagnini (engaged 1994–1998, his death)
- Children: 3
- Relatives: Joan Collins (sister)
- Website: www.jackiecollins.com

Jacqueline Jill Collins (4 October 1937 – 19 September 2015) was an English romance novelist and actress. She moved to Los Angeles in 1985 and spent most of her career there. She wrote 32 novels, all of which appeared on The New York Times Best Seller list. Her books have sold more than 500 million copies and have been translated into 40 languages. Eight of her novels have been adapted for the screen, either as films or television miniseries. She was the younger sister of Joan Collins.

== Early life ==
Collins was born on 4 October 1937, in Hampstead, London, the younger daughter of Elsa (née Bessant) Collins (died 1962) and Joseph William Collins (died 1988), a theatrical agent whose clients later included Shirley Bassey, the Beatles, and Tom Jones.

Collins's South African-born father was Jewish, and her British mother was Anglican. A middle child, Collins had an elder sister, Joan Collins (actress and author), and a younger brother, Bill (who became a property agent).

Collins attended Francis Holland School, an independent day school for girls in London and was expelled at age 15. During this period, she reportedly had a brief affair with 29-year-old Marlon Brando.

== Early career ==
In 1956, Collins visited her older sister, Joan, who was then based in Los Angeles. She returned to London after failing to gain a U.S. work permit to enable her to be groomed for stardom at 20th Century Fox. Collins began appearing in acting roles in a series of British B movies. These included They Never Learn (1956), Barnacle Bill (1957), Rock You Sinners (1957), The Safecracker (1958), Intent to Kill (1958), Passport to Shame (1958), and The Shakedown (1960), in which she was credited as Lynn Curtis. After minor appearances in such television series as Danger Man and The Saint, Collins gave up on pursuing an acting career, although she did play briefly on the television series Minder in 1980.

Her first book, The World Is Full of Married Men (1968), became a best-seller. Four decades later, she admitted she was a "school dropout" and "juvenile delinquent" when she was 15: "I'm glad I got all of that out of my system at an early age," she said, adding that she "never pretended to be a literary writer."

== Writing career ==
=== 1960s ===
Collins later said that she always wanted to write, not act. By the age of 13 classmates paid to listen to sex scenes she wrote. Collins began many works of fiction but abandoned them, and only completed her first novel after being persuaded to do so by her second husband Oscar Lerman. "You're a storyteller", he told her. After the publication of her first novel The World Is Full of Married Men, romantic novelist Barbara Cartland called the book "nasty, filthy and disgusting", and charged Collins with "creating every pervert in Britain". The book was banned in Australia and South Africa, but the scandal bolstered sales in the United States and the UK.

Her second novel, The Stud, was published in 1969. It also made the best-seller lists.

=== 1970s ===
By the 1970s Collins was a peer of successful male airport novel authors like Sidney Sheldon and Harold Robbins.. Her third novel, Sunday Simmons & Charlie Brick (first published under the title The Hollywood Zoo in the UK and then retitled Sinners worldwide in 1984) was published in 1971 and again made the best-seller lists. This was Collins's first novel to be set in the United States.

Lovehead followed in 1974 (retitled as The Love Killers in 1989). This novel was Collins's first foray into the world of organized crime, a genre that would later prove to be extremely successful for her.

Following this, Collins published The World Is Full of Divorced Women (unrelated to her first novel) in 1975, and then Lovers & Gamblers in 1977, which told the story of rock/soul superstar Al King.

In the late 1970s, Collins made a foray into writing for the screen. She co-wrote the screenplay for The Stud (1978), based on her second book; the film starred her older sister Joan as the gold-digging adulteress Fontaine Khaled. Following this, Collins wrote the screenplay for The World Is Full of Married Men (1980), the film adaptation of her first novel. She also released her seventh novel, The Bitch (1979), a sequel to The Stud; The Bitch was also made into a successful 1979 film, with Joan Collins reprising the role. Around the same time, Collins wrote an original screenplay (not based on any of her novels) for the film Yesterday's Hero (1979).

=== 1980s ===
There are so many bad boys out there, especially in Hollywood. And yes, I know so many of them. I loved writing about them, and you love reading about them. Unfortunately, that type attracts many young, naïve girls who don't know better, but I do. With age comes experience.

— Jackie Collins

In the 1980s, Collins and her family moved to Los Angeles on a full-time basis, where she would continue to write about the "rich and famous". She said, "If you wish to be successful, there is a place you should be at a certain time. And Los Angeles in the 1980s was it."

Her next novel was Chances (1981). It introduced one of her best-known characters, Lucky Santangelo, the "dangerously beautiful" daughter of a gangster.

While living in the hills above Sunset Boulevard, Collins collected the knowledge and experience to write her most commercially successful novel, Hollywood Wives (1983), which hit The New York Times best-seller list at number one. Marketed as a "scandalous exposé", the novel sold over 15 million copies and placed Collins in a powerful position, making her a celebrity of near equal status to her sister Joan, whose own career had taken an upwards direction with her role in the television drama Dynasty.

In 1985, Hollywood Wives was made into a television miniseries, produced by Aaron Spelling and starring Candice Bergen, Stefanie Powers, Angie Dickinson, Anthony Hopkins, Suzanne Somers, and Rod Steiger. Although credited as a "creative consultant", Collins later stated that she was never consulted during production and that she did not agree with some of the casting choices.

She then went on to write the sequel to Chances, titled Lucky (1985), followed by Hollywood Husbands (1986) and Rock Star (1988).

=== 1990s ===
In 1990, Collins published her third Lucky Santangelo novel, Lady Boss, and wrote and co-produced the television miniseries Lucky Chances, which combined her first two Lucky Santangelo novels and starred Nicollette Sheridan (in the lead role) and Sandra Bullock.

In 1992, Collins was widowed when her husband of 26 years, Oscar Lerman, died of cancer. Around this time, she wrote and produced another miniseries based on the Lady Boss novel, with Kim Delaney playing the lead role. Collins's run of best-sellers continued with American Star (1993), Hollywood Kids (1994), and the fourth Santangelo novel, Vendetta: Lucky's Revenge (1996).

She was the subject of This Is Your Life in 1993, when she was surprised by Michael Aspel. Her books had sold over 170 millions copies in over 30 countries by 1993.

In 1998, she made a foray into talk show television with the series Jackie Collins' Hollywood, but this was unsuccessful. She also published the novel Thrill (1998) and wrote a four-part series of mini-novels, called L.A. Connections, to be released in a newspaper every six weeks and which introduced a new heroine in the form of investigative journalist Madison Castelli. The fifth Lucky Santangelo novel, Dangerous Kiss, was published in 1999.

=== 2000s ===
The 2000s turned out to be Collins's busiest time; she published eight best-sellers, more than in any other decade in her career. In 2000, Collins brought back the character of Madison Castelli in a new novel, Lethal Seduction. In 2001, she published Hollywood Wives: The New Generation, which was adapted as a 2003 television movie starring Farrah Fawcett, Melissa Gilbert, and Robin Givens. (Collins was credited as an executive producer.) A new Madison Castelli novel, Deadly Embrace, was published in 2002, and Hollywood Divorces was published in 2003. In 2004, Collins hosted a series of television specials, Jackie Collins Presents, for E! Entertainment Television.

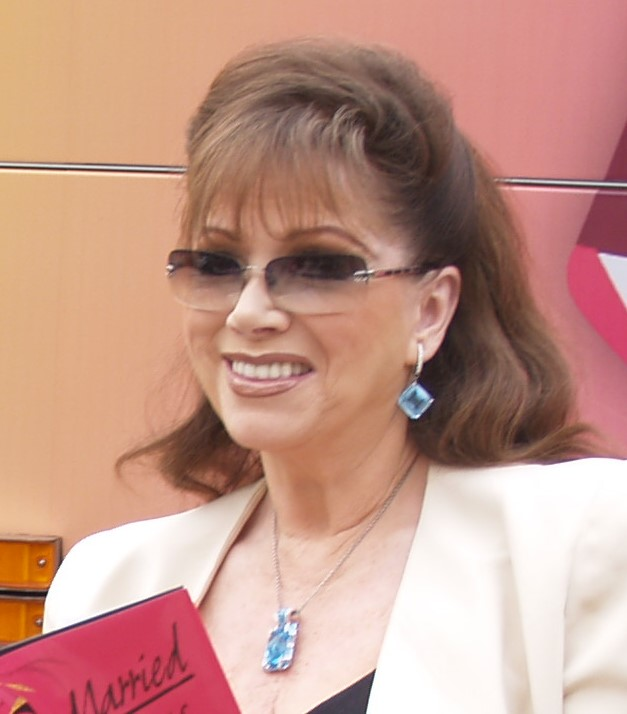
Collins in 2008

Collins continued with Lovers & Players (2006); the sixth Lucky Santangelo novel, Drop Dead Beautiful (2007); and Married Lovers (2008), which concerns the affairs of a female personal trainer named Cameron Paradise. This was followed by Poor Little Bitch Girl (2009), which stemmed from an idea Collins had worked on for a television series about heiresses that was ultimately never made. In 2009, she also guest starred as herself on an episode of the reality program Kathy Griffin: My Life on the D-List. In the episode, she helped give Kathy Griffin advice as the comedian worked on her upcoming memoir, "Official Book Club Selection."

=== 2010s ===
Paris Connections (2010), a direct-to-DVD movie adapted from Collins's L.A. Connections series of mini-novels, was made by Amber Entertainment in association with the UK supermarket chain Tesco. The movie stars Charles Dance, Trudie Styler, and Nicole Steinwedell (as Madison Castelli). Collins served as co-producer, and three more Connections movies with the Madison Castelli character are planned.

Collins continued to write Lucky Santangelo books, including Goddess of Vengeance. Her 29th novel, titled The Power Trip, was published in February 2013. Confessions of a Wild Child, was published in February 2014, with a movie deal announced even before the book came out.

Collins's cookbook, The Lucky Santangelo Cookbook (2014), is named after the protagonist of nine Collins novels, who is often portrayed preparing elaborate gastronomic creations for her intimates (and who watched her father throw a plate of food at her mother as a child). Collins's final novel was The Santangelos (2015), a conclusion to the Santangelo series she had begun with Chances (1981).

== Personal life ==
Collins held dual citizenship: British (by birth) and U.S. (by naturalization, from 6 May 1960). She married her first husband, Wallace Austin, in 1960; they divorced in 1964. Austin's addiction to drugs prescribed for manic depression ultimately caused their separation, and he died from a deliberate overdose the year after their marriage ended. The couple had one daughter, Tracy, born in 1961.

In 1965, Collins married again, this time to American art gallery and nightclub (Ad-Lib and Tramp) owner, Oscar Lerman, who was 18 years her senior. The wedding took place in the home of her sister Joan and her husband at the time, Anthony Newley. Collins and Lerman had two daughters, Tiffany (born 1967) and Rory (born 1969). Lerman also formally adopted Collins's daughter, Tracy, from her previous marriage. Lerman died in 1992 from prostate cancer.

In 1994, Collins became engaged to Los Angeles business executive Frank Calcagnini, who died in 1998 from a brain tumor. She said that what got her through the tragedies of losing two loved ones was "celebrating their lives, as opposed to dwelling on their deaths."

In 2011, when asked if she were dating anyone, Collins said: "I have a man for every occasion", adding:

When I was a kid growing up, I used to read my father's Playboy and I'd see these guys and they had fantastic apartments and cars. I have all of that now. Why would I want to hook myself up with one man when I've had two fantastic men in my life? One was my husband for over 20 years and one was my fiancé for six [sic] years.

She was appointed Officer of the Order of the British Empire (OBE) in the 2013 Birthday Honours for services to fiction and charity.

Throughout Collins's career she intentionally promoted a flamboyant public image, both to market her books and to protect her quieter private life. She claimed to have only had Botox once ("I hated it"), and avoided salons and buying new clothes; hobbies were television (Collins owned four TiVos) and Tweeting. Collins fictionalized aspects of her personal life as a source for her novels. She said she loved Los Angeles and recalled that while growing up in England, she often read novels by Robbins, Mickey Spillane, and Raymond Chandler. Dominick Dunne wrote that Collins "loved the picture business, the television business, the record business, and the people in them, the stars, celebrities, directors, and producers". Although she was a "great partygoer", he said, she went to them "more as an observer than participant", using them as part of her research. "Write about what you know", Collins said at a writer's conference. "I love what I do. I fall in love with my characters. They become me, and I become them".

== Death ==
Collins died from breast cancer in Los Angeles on 19 September 2015, at the age of 77. She had been diagnosed with stage-4 breast cancer more than six years before her death but kept her illness almost entirely to herself. She reportedly informed her sister Joan Collins two weeks before she died and flew from Los Angeles to London to appear on the ITV chat show Loose Women nine days before her death.

== Works ==
Standalone novels

- The World Is Full of Married Men (1968)
- Sunday Simmons & Charlie Brick (later Sinners) (1971)
- Lovehead (later The Love Killers) (1974)
- The World Is Full of Divorced Women (1975)
- Lovers and Gamblers (1977)
- Rock Star (1988)
- American Star (1993)
- Thrill! (1998)
- Lovers & Players (2006)
- Married Lovers (2008)
- The Power Trip (2012)

Fontaine Khaled series

- The Stud (1969)
- The Bitch (1979)

Hollywood series

- Hollywood Wives (1983)
- Hollywood Husbands (1986)
- Hollywood Kids (1994)
- Hollywood Wives: The New Generation (2001)
- Hollywood Divorces (2003)

Santangelo series

- Chances (1981)
- Lucky (1985)
- Lady Boss (1990)
- Vendetta: Lucky's Revenge (1996)
- Dangerous Kiss (1999)
- Drop Dead Beautiful (2007)
- Poor Little Bitch Girl (2009)
- Goddess of Vengeance (2011)
- Confessions of a Wild Child (2013)
- The Santangelos (2015)

Madison Castelli series

- L. A. Connections (serialised novel):
  - Power (1998)
  - Obsession (1998)
  - Murder (1998)
  - Revenge (1998)
- Lethal Seduction (2000)
- Deadly Embrace (2002)

Other

- The Lucky Santangelo Cookbook (2014)

== See also ==
- Publishers Weekly lists of bestselling novels in the United States
