= Santangelo novels =

Novels by Jackie Collins

The Santangelo novels are a series of novels written by Jackie Collins, which focus on the Santangelo family, particularly Gino Santangelo, an Italian-American former gangster, and his daughter Lucky. The novels, which take place from the 1920s to the present day, are set in the world of organised crime and include the Santangelos' rivalry with the Bonnatti and Kassari families. There are nine novels in the Santangelo saga and one spin-off. Confessions of a Wild Child (2013), is a prequel depicting Lucky's teenage years, which were briefly explored in the first Santangelo novel, Chances (1981).

== Main characters ==
- Gino Santangelo – first appears in Chances
- Lucky Santangelo – first appears in Chances
- Olympia Stanislopoulos – first appears in Chances
- Costa Zennocotti – first appears in Chances
- Carrie Berkley – first appears in Chances
- Steven Berkley – first appears in Chances
- Lennie Golden – first appears in Lucky
- Brigette Stanislopoulos – first appears in Lucky
- Alex Woods – first appears in Vendetta: Lucky's Revenge

== Family members ==
- Paulo Santangelo, d. 1939, married to:
  - Mira, married until 1910
  - Vera, married until 1939
- Gino Santangelo, 1905-2015 son of Paulo and Mira Santangelo, married to:
  - Cindy, married 1934-1939 her death
  - Maria Grazione, married 1949-1955 murdered.
  - Susan Martino, married 1979–1983
  - Paige Wheeler, married 1985–2015
- Steven Berkely, b. 1939, illegitimate son of Gino Santangelo and Carrie Berkely, married to:
  - Zizi, married 1968–1971
  - Mary Lou Morley, married 1984–1988
  - Lina, married
- Lucky Santangelo, b. 1950 daughter of Gino Santangelo and Maria Grazione, married to:
  - Craven Richmond, b. 1948, married 1966–1970
  - Dimitri Stanislopoulos, married 1979–1984
    - Roberto "Bobby" Stanislopoulos Santangelo, b. 1979 son of Dimitri Stanislopoulos and Lucky Santangelo
  - Lennie Golden, married 1984–Present
    - Maria "Max" Santangelo, b. 1986 daughter of Lennie Golden and Lucky Santangelo
    - Gino Santangelo II, b. 1987 son of Lennie Golden and Lucky Santangelo
- Dario Santangelo, b. September 1, 1951 d. 1977, son of Gino Santangelo and Maria Grazione
- Brigette Stanislopoulos, b. 1970, daughter of Olympia Stanislopoulos and Claudio Cadducci, at the death of her mother in 1984 she lived with her stepfather Lennie Golden and godmother Lucky Santangelo
- Leonardo Golden, illegitimate son of Claudia Bonnatti and Lennie Golden, adopted by Lucky Santangelo

== Other characters ==
- Marco, Gino's bodyguard and later, Lucky's sweetheart, much to her delight. Gunned down in a mob shooting, to Lucky's great sorrow
- Bee, Gino's former fiancée and Marco's mom
- Santino Bonatti, a mobster
- Marabelle Blue, an actress and another former fiancée of Gino's

== Other families ==
=== Zennocotti-Grazione family ===
- Franklin Zennocotti natural father of Leonora Zenoccotti Grazione, adopted father of Costa Zennocotti
- Leonora Zennoccotti Grazione, daughter of Franklin Zennocotti, married to:
  - Edward Grazione, married 1928
    - Maria Grazione, b. 1928 d.1955, daughter of Leonora Grazione and Edward Grazione
- Costa Zennocotti, adopted son of Franklin Zennocotti (adopted 1921), married to:
  - Jennifer, d. 1970, married 1934–1970

Gino Santangelo was intended to marry Leonora Zennocotti until she slept with Edward Grazione and became pregnant which spurred a shotgun wedding. Their child, Maria Grazione, married Gino in 1949. As a result of the marriage, Leonora and Edward disowned their daughter.

=== Richmond family ===
- Senator Peter Richmond, married to:
  - Betty Richmond
- Craven Richmond, b. 1948, married to
  - Lucky Santangelo, married 1966–1970

Gino married his sixteen-year-old daughter Lucky to Senator Richmond's son Craven to make an alliance between the two families and to exercise some control over his rebellious daughter. Gino's criminal past ruined Senator Richmond's chances for the Republican nomination and the two families did not speak after Lucky's divorce in 1970.

=== Stanislopoulos family ===
- Dimitri Stanislopoulos, d. 1984, father of Olympia Stanislopoulos and Roberto Stanislopoulos, married to:
  - Charlotte, an American society wife, mother of Olympia
  - Lucky Santangelo, married 1979–1984, mother of Roberto
- Olympia Stanislopoulos, b. 1948 d. 1984, married to:
  - Unnamed Greek playboy, married 1967 (four months)
  - Claudio Cadducci, d. 1970, married 1968–1970
  - Unnamed Polish Count, married 1970, (sixteen weeks)
  - Lennie Golden, married 1984
- Roberto (Bobby) Stanislopoulos, b. 1979

== Novels ==
- Chances (1981)
- Lucky (1985)
- Lady Boss (1990)
- Vendetta: Lucky's Revenge (1996)
- Dangerous Kiss (1999)
- Drop Dead Beautiful (2007)
- Poor Little Bitch Girl (2009)
- Goddess of Vengeance (2011)
- Confessions of a Wild Child (2013)
- The Santangelos (2015)

== Television adaptations ==
Two television miniseries have been made based on the Santangelo novels, which were adapted by Collins herself:

- Lucky Chances (1990) – based on the novels Chances and Lucky
- Lady Boss (1992) – based on the novel of the same name

The role of Lucky Santangelo was first played by actress Nicollette Sheridan in Lucky Chances, and later by Kim Delaney in Lady Boss.

== Film adaptations ==
In 2017, it was announced that Collins' Santangelo series of novels would be adapted into a film trilogy for the big screen by Universal Pictures. The trilogy will be produced by Monumental Pictures partners Debra Hayward and Alison Owen; and Working Title partners Tim Bevan and Eric Fellner. However, as of 2026, no progress has been made on the project.
